= Jaén (Parliament of Andalusia constituency) =

Coordinates: 38°00′N 3°30′W

- Parliament of Andalusia; Electoral constituency
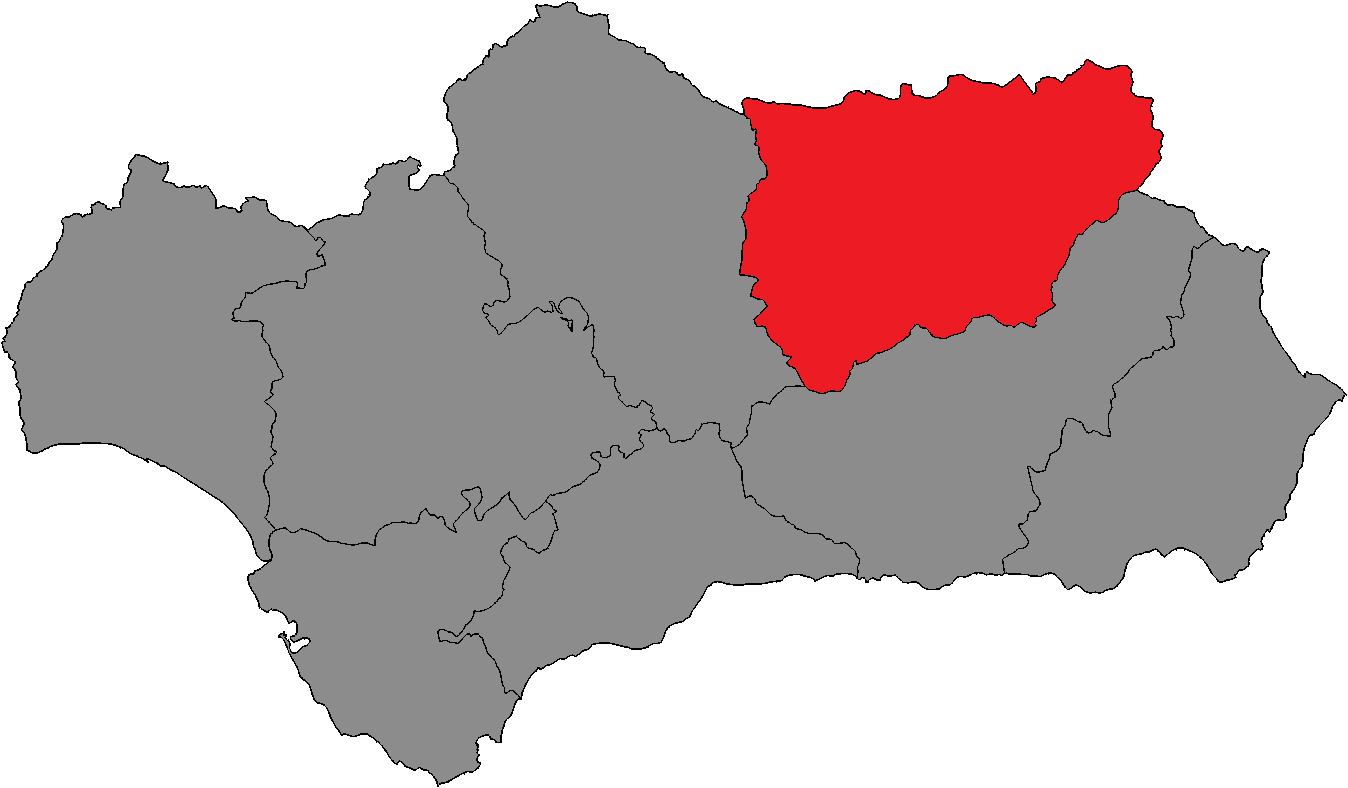
- Location of Jaén within Andalusia
- Province: Jaén
- Autonomous community: Andalusia
- Population: ▼617,604 (2025)
- Electorate: ▼515,378 (2026)
- Major settlements: Jaén, Linares

Current constituency
- Created: 1982
- Seats: 13 (1982–1990); 12 (1990–2012); 11 (2012–present)
- Members: PP (6); PSOE–A (4); Vox (1)

Jaén is one of the eight constituencies (Spanish: circunscripciones) represented in the Parliament of Andalusia, the regional legislature of the Autonomous Community of Andalusia. The constituency currently elects 11 deputies. Its boundaries correspond to those of the Spanish province of Jaén. The electoral system uses the D'Hondt method and closed-list proportional representation, with a minimum threshold of three percent.

== Electoral system ==
The constituency was established under the Statute of Autonomy for Andalusia of 1981 and was first contested in the 1982 regional election. The Statute (reformed in 2007) provides for the eight provinces in Andalusia—Almería, Cádiz, Córdoba, Granada, Huelva, Jaén, Málaga and Seville—to be set as multi-member constituencies in the Parliament of Andalusia, each of which is assigned an initial minimum of eight seats and the remaining ones are distributed in proportion to population (with the number of seats in each province not exceeding two times that of any other). The exception was the 1982 election, when each constituency was allocated a fixed number of seats. Seats are elected using the D'Hondt method and closed-list proportional voting, with a three percent-threshold of valid votes (including blank ballots) in each constituency. The use of this electoral method may result in a higher effective threshold depending on district magnitude and vote distribution. The law does not provide for by-elections to fill vacant seats; instead, any vacancies arising after the proclamation of candidates and during the legislative term are filled by the next candidates on the party lists or, when required, by designated substitutes.

Voting is based on universal suffrage, comprising all Spanish nationals over 18 years of age, registered in the constituency and with full political rights. Amendments in 2011 required non-resident citizens to apply for voting, a system known as "begged" voting (Spanish: Voto rogado), which was abolished in 2022 and attributed responsibility for a major decrease in the turnout of Spaniards abroad during the years it was in force. Additionally, those legally incapacitated were also barred from voting before amendments in 2018 granted them the right to vote.

The electoral law allows for parties and federations registered in the interior ministry, alliances and groupings of electors to present lists of candidates. Parties and federations intending to form an alliance are required to inform the relevant electoral commission within 10 days of the election call—15 before 1985—whereas groupings of electors need to secure the signature of at least one percent of the electorate in the constituencies for which they seek election (before 1985 this was one permille, with a compulsory minimum of 500 signatures), disallowing electors from signing for more than one list. Amendments in 2005 required a balanced composition of men and women in the electoral lists through the use of a zipper system.

== Deputies ==
Deputies 1982–present
Key to parties PCA–PCE IU–CA IULV–CA AA Podemos PSOE–A Cs UCD PP CP AP Vox
| Parliament | Election | Distribution |
| 1st | 1982 | 1 / 8 / 2 / 2 |
| 2nd | 1986 | 2 / 7 / 4 |
| 3rd | 1990 | 1 / 7 / 4 |
| 4th | 1994 | 2 / 5 / 5 |
| 5th | 1996 | 1 / 6 / 5 |
| 6th | 2000 | 1 / 6 / 5 |
| 7th | 2004 | 1 / 7 / 4 |
| 8th | 2008 | 7 / 5 |
| 9th | 2012 | 1 / 5 / 5 |
| 10th | 2015 | 1 / 6 / 4 |
| 11th | 2018 | 1 / 4 / 2 / 3 / 1 |
| 12th | 2022 | 4 / 6 / 1 |
| 13th | 2026 | 4 / 6 / 1 |

== Regional elections ==
=== 2026 ===
Summary of the 17 May 2026 Parliament of Andalusia election results in Jaén
| Parties and alliances | Popular vote | | | Seats | |
| Parties and alliances | Votes | % | ±pp | Total | +/− |
|---|---|---|---|---|---|
| People's Party (PP) | 148,600 | 43.68 | +1.23 | 6 | ±0 |
| Spanish Socialist Workers' Party of Andalusia (PSOE–A) | 92,882 | 27.30 | +0.19 | 4 | ±0 |
| Vox (Vox) | 46,165 | 13.57 | +0.73 | 1 | ±0 |
| For Andalusia (IU–Podemos–MS–IdPA–VQ–ALTER–AV) | 17,379 | 5.11 | −0.48 | 0 | ±0 |
| Forward Andalusia (Adelante Andalucía) | 14,864 | 4.37 | +2.59 | 0 | ±0 |
| Jaén Deserves More (JM+) | 7,993 | 2.35 | −3.55 | 0 | ±0 |
| The Party is Over (SALF) | 5,498 | 1.62 | New | 0 | ±0 |
| Animalist Party with the Environment (PACMA)^{1} | 1,355 | 0.40 | −0.15 | 0 | ±0 |
| Andalusians–Andalusian People–Stop Biogas (Andalucistas–PA)^{2} | 730 | 0.21 | +0.08 | 0 | ±0 |
| Communist Party of the Andalusian People (PCPA) | 694 | 0.20 | +0.06 | 0 | ±0 |
| Blank Seats to Leave Empty Seats (EB) | 539 | 0.16 | +0.08 | 0 | ±0 |
| For a Fairer World (M+J) | 397 | 0.12 | +0.02 | 0 | ±0 |
| Spanish Phalanx of the CNSO (FE de las JONS) | 389 | 0.11 | +0.08 | 0 | ±0 |
| Andalusian Nation (NA) | 180 | 0.05 | −0.01 | 0 | ±0 |
| Blank ballots | 2,509 | 0.74 | −0.03 | | |
| Total | 340,174 | | | 11 | ±0 |
| Valid votes | 340,174 | 98.66 | −0.03 | | |
| Invalid votes | 4,609 | 1.34 | +0.03 | | |
| Votes cast / turnout | 344,783 | 66.90 | +4.81 | | |
| Abstentions | 170,602 | 33.10 | −4.81 | | |
| Registered voters | 515,385 | | | | |
Sources
Footnotes: ^{1} Animalist Party with the Environment results are compared to Animalist Party Against Mistreatment of Animals totals in the 2022 election.; ^{2} Andalusians–Andalusian People–Stop Biogas results are compared to Arise Andalusians Coalition in the 2022 election.

=== 2022 ===
Summary of the 19 June 2022 Parliament of Andalusia election results in Jaén
| Parties and alliances | Popular vote | | | Seats | |
| Parties and alliances | Votes | % | ±pp | Total | +/− |
|---|---|---|---|---|---|
| People's Party (PP) | 135,771 | 42.45 | +19.28 | 6 | +3 |
| Spanish Socialist Workers' Party of Andalusia (PSOE–A) | 86,686 | 27.11 | –8.28 | 4 | ±0 |
| Vox (Vox) | 41,049 | 12.84 | +4.13 | 1 | ±0 |
| Jaén Deserves More (JM+) | 18,873 | 5.90 | New | 0 | ±0 |
| United Left–More Country–Greens Equo–Initiative: For Andalusia (PorA)^{1} | 17,875 | 5.59 | n/a | 0 | ±0 |
| Citizens–Party of the Citizenry (Cs) | 7,085 | 2.22 | –13.73 | 0 | –2 |
| Forward Andalusia–Andalusians (Adelante Andalucía–Andalucistas)^{1} | 5,695 | 1.78 | n/a | 0 | –1 |
| Animalist Party Against Mistreatment of Animals (PACMA) | 1,756 | 0.55 | –0.74 | 0 | ±0 |
| Communist Party of the Andalusian People (PCPA) | 445 | 0.14 | –0.05 | 0 | ±0 |
| Zero Cuts–Alive Jaén! (Recortes Cero–JV) | 414 | 0.13 | +0.01 | 0 | ±0 |
| Arise Andalusians Coalition (AL)^{2} | 413 | 0.13 | –0.17 | 0 | ±0 |
| Socialist Republican Coalition for Andalusia (CRSxA) | 407 | 0.13 | New | 0 | ±0 |
| For a Fairer World (PUM+J) | 317 | 0.10 | New | 0 | ±0 |
| Blank Seats (EB) | 257 | 0.08 | New | 0 | ±0 |
| Andalusian Nation (NA) | 196 | 0.06 | –0.04 | 0 | ±0 |
| Spanish Phalanx of the CNSO (FE de las JONS) | 109 | 0.03 | –0.03 | 0 | ±0 |
| Blank ballots | 2,457 | 0.77 | –0.50 | | |
| Total | 319,805 | | | 11 | ±0 |
| Valid votes | 319,805 | 98.69 | +1.22 | | |
| Invalid votes | 4,248 | 1.31 | –1.22 | | |
| Votes cast / turnout | 324,053 | 62.09 | +0.22 | | |
| Abstentions | 197,883 | 37.91 | –0.22 | | |
| Registered voters | 521,936 | | | | |
Sources
Footnotes: ^{1} Within the Forward–We Can–United Left–Spring–Andalusian Left alliance in the 2018 election.; ^{2} Arise Andalusians Coalition results are compared to Andalusia by Herself totals in the 2018 election.

=== 2018 ===
Summary of the 2 December 2018 Parliament of Andalusia election results in Jaén
| Parties and alliances | Popular vote | | | Seats | |
| Parties and alliances | Votes | % | ±pp | Total | +/− |
|---|---|---|---|---|---|
| Spanish Socialist Workers' Party of Andalusia (PSOE–A) | 112,423 | 35.39 | –7.29 | 4 | –2 |
| People's Party (PP) | 73,587 | 23.17 | –5.93 | 3 | –1 |
| Citizens–Party of the Citizenry (Cs) | 50,646 | 15.95 | +10.00 | 2 | +2 |
| Forward–We Can–United Left–Spring–Andalusian Left (Adelante Andalucía)^{1} | 38,597 | 12.15 | –4.62 | 1 | ±0 |
| Vox (Vox) | 27,676 | 8.71 | +8.40 | 1 | +1 |
| Animalist Party Against Mistreatment of Animals (PACMA) | 4,103 | 1.29 | +0.78 | 0 | ±0 |
| Respect (Respeto) | 1,034 | 0.33 | New | 0 | ±0 |
| United Linares Independent Citizens (CILU–Linares) | 965 | 0.30 | New | 0 | ±0 |
| Andalusia by Herself (AxSí)^{2} | 957 | 0.30 | –0.91 | 0 | ±0 |
| United Free Citizens (CILUS) | 847 | 0.27 | –0.19 | 0 | ±0 |
| Equo Greens–Andalusia Initiative (Equo–Iniciativa) | 697 | 0.22 | New | 0 | ±0 |
| Communist Party of the Andalusian People (PCPA) | 597 | 0.19 | +0.11 | 0 | ±0 |
| Zero Cuts–For a Fairer World–Green Group (Recortes Cero–M+J–GV)^{3} | 369 | 0.12 | +0.04 | 0 | ±0 |
| Union, Progress and Democracy (UPyD) | 360 | 0.11 | –1.34 | 0 | ±0 |
| Andalusian Nation (NA) | 306 | 0.10 | New | 0 | ±0 |
| Andalusian Solidary Independent Republican Party (RISA) | 228 | 0.07 | +0.02 | 0 | ±0 |
| Spanish Phalanx of the CNSO (FE de las JONS) | 191 | 0.06 | –0.04 | 0 | ±0 |
| Blank ballots | 4,046 | 1.27 | +0.09 | | |
| Total | 317,629 | | | 11 | ±0 |
| Valid votes | 317,629 | 97.47 | –1.25 | | |
| Invalid votes | 8,228 | 2.53 | +1.25 | | |
| Votes cast / turnout | 325,857 | 61.87 | –6.08 | | |
| Abstentions | 200,861 | 38.13 | +6.08 | | |
| Registered voters | 526,718 | | | | |
Sources
Footnotes: ^{1} Forward–We Can–United Left–Spring–Andalusian Left results are compared to the combined totals of We Can and United Left/The Greens–Assembly for Andalusia in the 2015 election.; ^{2} Andalusia by Herself results are compared to Andalusian Party totals in the 2015 election.; ^{3} Zero Cuts–For a Fairer World–Green Group results are compared to Zero Cuts totals in the 2015 election.

=== 2015 ===
Summary of the 22 March 2015 Parliament of Andalusia election results in Jaén
| Parties and alliances | Popular vote | | | Seats | |
| Parties and alliances | Votes | % | ±pp | Total | +/− |
|---|---|---|---|---|---|
| Spanish Socialist Workers' Party of Andalusia (PSOE–A) | 153,424 | 42.68 | –1.83 | 6 | +1 |
| People's Party (PP) | 104,615 | 29.10 | –11.98 | 4 | –1 |
| We Can (Podemos) | 39,724 | 11.05 | New | 1 | +1 |
| Citizens–Party of the Citizenry (C's) | 21,404 | 5.95 | New | 0 | ±0 |
| United Left/The Greens–Assembly for Andalusia (IULV–CA) | 20,552 | 5.72 | –3.05 | 0 | –1 |
| Union, Progress and Democracy (UPyD) | 5,196 | 1.45 | –0.84 | 0 | ±0 |
| Andalusian Party (PA) | 4,355 | 1.21 | –0.36 | 0 | ±0 |
| Animalist Party Against Mistreatment of Animals (PACMA) | 1,824 | 0.51 | +0.39 | 0 | ±0 |
| United Free Citizens (CILUS) | 1,641 | 0.46 | New | 0 | ±0 |
| Vox (Vox) | 1,110 | 0.31 | New | 0 | ±0 |
| Spanish Phalanx of the CNSO (FE de las JONS) | 355 | 0.10 | +0.05 | 0 | ±0 |
| Zero Cuts (Recortes Cero) | 295 | 0.08 | New | 0 | ±0 |
| Communist Party of the Peoples of Spain (PCPE) | 287 | 0.08 | –0.01 | 0 | ±0 |
| Regionalist Party for Eastern Andalusia (PRAO) | 254 | 0.07 | +0.01 | 0 | ±0 |
| Andalusian Solidary Independent Republican Party (RISA) | 182 | 0.05 | +0.01 | 0 | ±0 |
| Blank ballots | 4,226 | 1.18 | +0.44 | | |
| Total | 359,444 | | | 11 | ±0 |
| Valid votes | 359,444 | 98.72 | –0.67 | | |
| Invalid votes | 4,666 | 1.28 | +0.67 | | |
| Votes cast / turnout | 364,110 | 67.95 | –1.61 | | |
| Abstentions | 171,737 | 32.05 | +1.61 | | |
| Registered voters | 535,847 | | | | |

=== 2012 ===
Summary of the 25 March 2012 Parliament of Andalusia election results in Jaén
| Parties and alliances | Popular vote | | | Seats | |
| Parties and alliances | Votes | % | ±pp | Total | +/− |
|---|---|---|---|---|---|
| Spanish Socialist Workers' Party of Andalusia (PSOE–A) | 165,324 | 44.51 | –8.84 | 5 | –2 |
| People's Party (PP) | 152,591 | 41.08 | +4.46 | 5 | ±0 |
| United Left/The Greens–Assembly for Andalusia (IULV–CA) | 32,562 | 8.77 | +2.68 | 1 | +1 |
| Union, Progress and Democracy (UPyD) | 8,508 | 2.29 | +1.99 | 0 | ±0 |
| Andalusian Party (PA)^{1} | 5,833 | 1.57 | –0.25 | 0 | ±0 |
| Equo (Equo) | 1,112 | 0.30 | New | 0 | ±0 |
| Hartos.org (Hartos.org) | 494 | 0.13 | New | 0 | ±0 |
| Animalist Party Against Mistreatment of Animals (PACMA) | 434 | 0.12 | New | 0 | ±0 |
| Communist Party of the Peoples of Spain (PCPE) | 345 | 0.09 | –0.02 | 0 | ±0 |
| Blank Seats (EB) | 285 | 0.08 | New | 0 | ±0 |
| Regionalist Party for Eastern Andalusia (PRAO) | 211 | 0.06 | New | 0 | ±0 |
| Internationalist Solidarity and Self-Management (SAIn) | 199 | 0.05 | –0.11 | 0 | ±0 |
| Spanish Phalanx of the CNSO (FE de las JONS) | 198 | 0.05 | –0.02 | 0 | ±0 |
| Liberal Democratic Centre (CDL) | 174 | 0.05 | New | 0 | ±0 |
| Andalusian Solidary Independent Republican Party (RISA) | 135 | 0.04 | New | 0 | ±0 |
| Family and Life Party (PFyV) | 107 | 0.03 | New | 0 | ±0 |
| Communist Unification of Spain (UCE) | 102 | 0.03 | New | 0 | ±0 |
| Spanish Alternative (AES) | 83 | 0.02 | New | 0 | ±0 |
| Blank ballots | 2,742 | 0.74 | –0.11 | | |
| Total | 371,439 | | | 11 | –1 |
| Valid votes | 371,439 | 99.39 | +0.15 | | |
| Invalid votes | 2,296 | 0.61 | –0.15 | | |
| Votes cast / turnout | 373,735 | 69.56 | –8.94 | | |
| Abstentions | 163,579 | 30.44 | +8.94 | | |
| Registered voters | 537,314 | | | | |
Sources
Footnotes: ^{1} Andalusian Party results are compared to Andalusian Coalition totals in the 2008 election.

=== 2008 ===
Summary of the 9 March 2008 Parliament of Andalusia election results in Jaén
| Parties and alliances | Popular vote | | | Seats | |
| Parties and alliances | Votes | % | ±pp | Total | +/− |
|---|---|---|---|---|---|
| Spanish Socialist Workers' Party of Andalusia (PSOE–A) | 220,424 | 53.35 | +0.24 | 7 | ±0 |
| People's Party (PP) | 151,295 | 36.62 | +4.21 | 5 | +1 |
| United Left/The Greens–Assembly for Andalusia (IULV–CA) | 25,146 | 6.09 | –0.46 | 0 | –1 |
| Andalusian Coalition (CA)^{1} | 7,528 | 1.82 | –4.72 | 0 | ±0 |
| Union, Progress and Democracy (UPyD) | 1,240 | 0.30 | New | 0 | ±0 |
| The Greens (LV) | 1,116 | 0.27 | New | 0 | ±0 |
| Andalusian Convergence (CAnda) | 660 | 0.16 | New | 0 | ±0 |
| Internationalist Solidarity and Self-Management (SAIn) | 656 | 0.16 | New | 0 | ±0 |
| Communist Party of the Andalusian People (PCPA) | 464 | 0.11 | New | 0 | ±0 |
| Citizens–Party of the Citizenry (C's) | 312 | 0.08 | New | 0 | ±0 |
| Spanish Phalanx of the CNSO (FE de las JONS) | 302 | 0.07 | ±0.00 | 0 | ±0 |
| Republican Left (IR) | 273 | 0.07 | New | 0 | ±0 |
| Humanist Party (PH) | 251 | 0.06 | –0.03 | 0 | ±0 |
| Blank ballots | 3,521 | 0.85 | –0.19 | | |
| Total | 413,188 | | | 12 | ±0 |
| Valid votes | 413,188 | 99.24 | +0.01 | | |
| Invalid votes | 3,152 | 0.76 | –0.01 | | |
| Votes cast / turnout | 416,340 | 78.50 | –1.81 | | |
| Abstentions | 114,047 | 21.50 | +1.81 | | |
| Registered voters | 530,387 | | | | |
Sources
Footnotes: ^{1} Andalusian Coalition results are compared to the combined totals of Andalusian Party, Andalusian Forum and Socialist Party of Andalusia in the 2004 election.

=== 2004 ===
Summary of the 14 March 2004 Parliament of Andalusia election results in Jaén
| Parties and alliances | Popular vote | | | Seats | |
| Parties and alliances | Votes | % | ±pp | Total | +/− |
|---|---|---|---|---|---|
| Spanish Socialist Workers' Party of Andalusia (PSOE–A) | 222,596 | 53.11 | +4.89 | 7 | +1 |
| People's Party (PP) | 135,825 | 32.41 | –5.83 | 4 | –1 |
| United Left/The Greens–Assembly for Andalusia (IULV–CA) | 27,884 | 6.65 | –0.67 | 1 | ±0 |
| Andalusian Party (PA) | 23,943 | 5.71 | +0.86 | 0 | ±0 |
| Andalusian Forum (FA) | 1,900 | 0.45 | New | 0 | ±0 |
| Socialist Party of Andalusia (PSA) | 1,592 | 0.38 | New | 0 | ±0 |
| Humanist Party (PH) | 383 | 0.09 | +0.02 | 0 | ±0 |
| Andalusia Assembly (A) | 352 | 0.08 | +0.01 | 0 | ±0 |
| Spanish Phalanx of the CNSO (FE de las JONS) | 307 | 0.07 | New | 0 | ±0 |
| Blank ballots | 4,338 | 1.04 | +0.13 | | |
| Total | 419,120 | | | 12 | ±0 |
| Valid votes | 419,120 | 99.23 | –0.08 | | |
| Invalid votes | 3,269 | 0.77 | +0.08 | | |
| Votes cast / turnout | 422,389 | 80.31 | +3.59 | | |
| Abstentions | 103,585 | 19.69 | –3.59 | | |
| Registered voters | 525,974 | | | | |

=== 2000 ===
Summary of the 12 March 2000 Parliament of Andalusia election results in Jaén
| Parties and alliances | Popular vote | | | Seats | |
| Parties and alliances | Votes | % | ±pp | Total | +/− |
|---|---|---|---|---|---|
| Spanish Socialist Workers' Party of Andalusia (PSOE–A) | 192,766 | 48.22 | +0.93 | 6 | ±0 |
| People's Party (PP) | 152,848 | 38.24 | +2.07 | 5 | ±0 |
| United Left/The Greens–Assembly for Andalusia (IULV–CA) | 29,256 | 7.32 | –4.88 | 1 | ±0 |
| Andalusian Party (PA) | 19,407 | 4.85 | +1.56 | 0 | ±0 |
| Andalusian Left (IA) | 601 | 0.15 | New | 0 | ±0 |
| Andalusian Nation (NA) | 372 | 0.09 | +0.01 | 0 | ±0 |
| The Phalanx (FE) | 304 | 0.08 | New | 0 | ±0 |
| Andalusia Assembly (A) | 283 | 0.07 | New | 0 | ±0 |
| Humanist Party (PH) | 277 | 0.07 | +0.02 | 0 | ±0 |
| Blank ballots | 3,638 | 0.91 | +0.29 | | |
| Total | 399,752 | | | 12 | ±0 |
| Valid votes | 399,752 | 99.31 | –0.09 | | |
| Invalid votes | 2,762 | 0.69 | +0.09 | | |
| Votes cast / turnout | 402,514 | 76.72 | –6.93 | | |
| Abstentions | 122,113 | 23.28 | +6.93 | | |
| Registered voters | 524,627 | | | | |

=== 1996 ===
Summary of the 3 March 1996 Parliament of Andalusia election results in Jaén
| Parties and alliances | Popular vote | | | Seats | |
| Parties and alliances | Votes | % | ±pp | Total | +/− |
|---|---|---|---|---|---|
| Spanish Socialist Workers' Party of Andalusia (PSOE–A) | 199,637 | 47.29 | +4.69 | 6 | +1 |
| People's Party (PP) | 152,683 | 36.17 | +0.29 | 5 | ±0 |
| United Left/The Greens–Assembly for Andalusia (IULV–CA) | 51,488 | 12.20 | –3.44 | 1 | –1 |
| Andalusian Party (PA)^{1} | 13,903 | 3.29 | –0.82 | 0 | ±0 |
| Communist Party of the Andalusian People (PCPA) | 620 | 0.15 | –0.13 | 0 | ±0 |
| Centrist Union (UC) | 408 | 0.10 | –0.16 | 0 | ±0 |
| Andalusian Nation (NA) | 357 | 0.08 | –0.09 | 0 | ±0 |
| Humanist Party (PH) | 225 | 0.05 | –0.04 | 0 | ±0 |
| Authentic Spanish Phalanx (FEA) | 225 | 0.05 | New | 0 | ±0 |
| Blank ballots | 2,617 | 0.62 | –0.09 | | |
| Total | 422,163 | | | 12 | ±0 |
| Valid votes | 422,163 | 99.40 | ±0.00 | | |
| Invalid votes | 2,560 | 0.60 | ±0.00 | | |
| Votes cast / turnout | 424,723 | 83.65 | +8.41 | | |
| Abstentions | 83,023 | 16.35 | –8.41 | | |
| Registered voters | 507,746 | | | | |
Sources
Footnotes: ^{1} Andalusian Party results are compared to Andalusian Coalition–Andalusian Power totals in the 1994 election.

=== 1994 ===
Summary of the 12 June 1994 Parliament of Andalusia election results in Jaén
| Parties and alliances | Popular vote | | | Seats | |
| Parties and alliances | Votes | % | ±pp | Total | +/− |
|---|---|---|---|---|---|
| Spanish Socialist Workers' Party of Andalusia (PSOE–A) | 158,712 | 42.60 | –9.20 | 5 | –2 |
| People's Party (PP) | 133,680 | 35.88 | +8.71 | 5 | +1 |
| United Left/The Greens–Assembly for Andalusia (IULV–CA) | 58,255 | 15.64 | +4.17 | 2 | +1 |
| Andalusian Coalition–Andalusian Power (PA–PAP)^{1} | 15,307 | 4.11 | –1.46 | 0 | ±0 |
| Communist Party of the Andalusian People (PCPA) | 1,044 | 0.28 | –0.02 | 0 | ±0 |
| Forum–Democratic and Social Centre (Foro–CDS) | 963 | 0.26 | –0.91 | 0 | ±0 |
| Andalusian Nation (NA)^{2} | 692 | 0.19 | +0.14 | 0 | ±0 |
| Socialist October (OS) | 641 | 0.17 | New | 0 | ±0 |
| Humanist Party (PH) | 343 | 0.09 | +0.04 | 0 | ±0 |
| Spanish Phalanx of the CNSO (FE–JONS) | 270 | 0.07 | –0.04 | 0 | ±0 |
| Blank ballots | 2,628 | 0.71 | +0.40 | | |
| Total | 372,535 | | | 12 | ±0 |
| Valid votes | 372,535 | 99.40 | –0.23 | | |
| Invalid votes | 2,266 | 0.60 | +0.23 | | |
| Votes cast / turnout | 374,801 | 75.24 | +9.70 | | |
| Abstentions | 123,333 | 24.76 | –9.70 | | |
| Registered voters | 498,134 | | | | |
Sources
Footnotes: ^{1} Andalusian Coalition–Andalusian Power results are compared to Andalusian Party totals in the 1990 election.; ^{2} Andalusian Nation results are compared to Andalusian Front of Liberation totals in the 1990 election.

=== 1990 ===
Summary of the 23 June 1990 Parliament of Andalusia election results in Jaén
| Parties and alliances | Popular vote | | | Seats | |
| Parties and alliances | Votes | % | ±pp | Total | +/− |
|---|---|---|---|---|---|
| Spanish Socialist Workers' Party of Andalusia (PSOE–A) | 163,923 | 51.80 | +2.68 | 7 | ±0 |
| People's Party (PP)^{1} | 86,000 | 27.17 | +0.37 | 4 | ±0 |
| United Left–Assembly for Andalusia (IU–CA) | 36,314 | 11.47 | –4.19 | 1 | –1 |
| Andalusian Party (PA) | 17,617 | 5.57 | +2.87 | 0 | ±0 |
| Democratic and Social Centre (CDS) | 3,710 | 1.17 | –2.22 | 0 | ±0 |
| Socialist Democracy (DS) | 2,694 | 0.85 | New | 0 | ±0 |
| The Ecologist Greens (LVE) | 979 | 0.31 | New | 0 | ±0 |
| Greens of Andalusia (VA) | 967 | 0.31 | New | 0 | ±0 |
| Communist Party of the Andalusian People (PCPA) | 941 | 0.30 | New | 0 | ±0 |
| Workers' Party of Spain–Communist Unity (PTE–UC)^{2} | 924 | 0.29 | –0.44 | 0 | ±0 |
| Ruiz-Mateos Group (ARM) | 745 | 0.24 | New | 0 | ±0 |
| Spanish Phalanx of the CNSO (FE–JONS) | 338 | 0.11 | New | 0 | ±0 |
| Humanist Party (PH) | 163 | 0.05 | –0.12 | 0 | ±0 |
| Andalusian Front of Liberation (FAL) | 157 | 0.05 | New | 0 | ±0 |
| Blank ballots | 996 | 0.31 | +0.04 | | |
| Total | 316,468 | | | 12 | –1 |
| Valid votes | 316,468 | 99.63 | +1.09 | | |
| Invalid votes | 1,164 | 0.37 | –1.09 | | |
| Votes cast / turnout | 317,632 | 65.54 | –10.33 | | |
| Abstentions | 166,975 | 34.46 | +10.33 | | |
| Registered voters | 484,607 | | | | |
Sources
Footnotes: ^{1} People's Party results are compared to People's Coalition totals in the 1986 election.; ^{2} Workers' Party of Spain–Communist Unity results are compared to Communists' Unity Board totals in the 1986 election.

=== 1986 ===
Summary of the 22 June 1986 Parliament of Andalusia election results in Jaén
| Parties and alliances | Popular vote | | | Seats | |
| Parties and alliances | Votes | % | ±pp | Total | +/− |
|---|---|---|---|---|---|
| Spanish Socialist Workers' Party of Andalusia (PSOE–A) | 178,975 | 49.12 | –2.85 | 7 | –1 |
| People's Coalition (AP–PDP–PL)^{1} | 97,666 | 26.80 | +10.43 | 4 | +2 |
| United Left–Assembly for Andalusia (IU–CA)^{2} | 57,045 | 15.66 | +6.69 | 2 | +1 |
| Democratic and Social Centre (CDS) | 12,345 | 3.39 | New | 0 | ±0 |
| Andalusian Party (PA) | 9,856 | 2.70 | –0.78 | 0 | ±0 |
| Communists' Unity Board (MUC) | 2,659 | 0.73 | New | 0 | ±0 |
| Democratic Reformist Party (PRD) | 2,199 | 0.60 | New | 0 | ±0 |
| Socialist Party of the Andalusian People (PSPA) | 1,482 | 0.41 | New | 0 | ±0 |
| Humanist Party (PH) | 637 | 0.17 | New | 0 | ±0 |
| Andalusian Liberation (LA) | 520 | 0.14 | New | 0 | ±0 |
| Union of the Democratic Centre (UCD) | n/a | n/a | –16.19 | 0 | –2 |
| Blank ballots | 989 | 0.27 | +0.09 | | |
| Total | 364,373 | | | 13 | ±0 |
| Valid votes | 364,373 | 98.54 | –0.86 | | |
| Invalid votes | 5,382 | 1.46 | +0.86 | | |
| Votes cast / turnout | 369,755 | 75.87 | +1.41 | | |
| Abstentions | 117,609 | 24.13 | –1.41 | | |
| Registered voters | 487,364 | | | | |
Sources
Footnotes: ^{1} People's Coalition results are compared to People's Alliance–People's Democratic Party totals in the 1982 election.; ^{2} United Left–Assembly for Andalusia results are compared to Communist Party of Andalusia totals in the 1982 election.

=== 1982 ===
Summary of the 23 May 1982 Parliament of Andalusia election results in Jaén
| Parties and alliances | Popular vote | | | Seats | |
| Parties and alliances | Votes | % | ±pp | Total | +/− |
|---|---|---|---|---|---|
| Spanish Socialist Workers' Party of Andalusia (PSOE–A) | 172,423 | 51.97 | n/a | 8 | n/a |
| People's Alliance (AP) | 54,302 | 16.37 | n/a | 2 | n/a |
| Union of the Democratic Centre (UCD) | 53,717 | 16.19 | n/a | 2 | n/a |
| Communist Party of Andalusia (PCA–PCE) | 29,758 | 8.97 | n/a | 1 | n/a |
| Socialist Party of Andalusia–Andalusian Party (PSA–PA) | 11,544 | 3.48 | n/a | 0 | n/a |
| New Force (FN) | 6,278 | 1.89 | n/a | 0 | n/a |
| Communist Unification of Spain (UCE) | 929 | 0.28 | n/a | 0 | n/a |
| Spanish Phalanx of the CNSO (FE–JONS) | 779 | 0.23 | n/a | 0 | n/a |
| Communist Movement of Andalusia (MCA) | 555 | 0.17 | n/a | 0 | n/a |
| Andalusian People's Solidarity (SPA) | 490 | 0.15 | n/a | 0 | n/a |
| Falangist Movement of Spain (MFE) | 412 | 0.12 | n/a | 0 | n/a |
| Blank ballots | 608 | 0.18 | n/a | | |
| Total | 331,795 | | | 13 | n/a |
| Valid votes | 331,795 | 99.40 | n/a | | |
| Invalid votes | 1,992 | 0.60 | n/a | | |
| Votes cast / turnout | 333,787 | 74.46 | n/a | | |
| Abstentions | 114,510 | 25.54 | n/a | | |
| Registered voters | 448,297 | | | | |

== Bibliography ==
- Real Decreto-ley 20/1977, de 18 de marzo, sobre Normas Electorales (Royal Decree-Law 20/1977). Official State Gazette (in Spanish). 18 March 1977. BOE-A-1977-7445.
- Ley Orgánica 6/1981, de 30 de diciembre, de Estatuto de Autonomía para Andalucía (Organic Law 6/1981). Official State Gazette (in Spanish). 30 December 1981. BOE-A-1982-633.
- Decreto 18/1982, de ocho de Marzo, por el que se convocan Elecciones al Parlamento de Andalucía (PDF) (Decree 18/1982). Official Gazette of the Regional Government of Andalusia (in Spanish). 8 March 1982.
- Ley Orgánica 5/1985, de 19 de junio, del Régimen Electoral General (Organic Law 5/1985). Official State Gazette (in Spanish). 19 June 1985. BOE-A-1985-11672.
- Ley 1/1986, de 2 de enero, Electoral de Andalucía (Law 1/1986). Official State Gazette (in Spanish). 2 January 1986. BOE-A-1986-2788.
- Ley Orgánica 2/2007, de 19 de marzo, de reforma del Estatuto de Autonomía para Andalucía (Organic Law 2/2007). Official State Gazette (in Spanish). 19 March 2007. BOE-A-2007-5825.
