= Juan Antonio Delgado =

Spanish politician (born 1971)

Juan Antonio Delgado Ramos (born 18 March 1971) is a Spanish politician of the party Podemos. Formerly a civil guard, he was a member of the Congress of Deputies (2015–2019; 2021–2022), and was elected to the Parliament of Andalusia in 2022.

== Early life and police career ==
Born in Cádiz, Delgado was the youngest of seven children of a builder and a housewife. He was a member of the Civil Guard from 1992 to 2015. In 1997, he was named spokesperson of the Unified Association of Civil Guards (AUGC), their largest trade union. He was stationed in Barcelona until being transferred to Barbate in his native Province of Cádiz, where his patrols on the beach included saving lives of migrants. In 2007, he was suspended without pay for six months for organising an AUGC demonstration in Madrid.

== Political career ==
Delgado took leave from the police to be the second candidate on the list of Podemos in the Cádiz constituency for the 2015 Spanish general election. He was elected as the party took two seats in the constituency. He kept his seat for three more legislatures of the Congress of Deputies. He was not elected in the November 2019 election, but returned to Congress when Noelia Vera retired in September 2021.

In May 2022, Delgado ran unopposed, albeit with 71% of the vote, to lead Podemos in the 2022 Andalusian regional election. His party joined up to make Por Andalucía alongside the United Left (IU), Más País, Greens Equo and the Andalusian People's Initiative, and he led their candidacy in the Cádiz constituency. The party ran against another left-wing list, Adelante Andalucía of Teresa Rodríguez, and Por Andalucía tried unsuccessfully to unite the lists. Por Andalucía won five seats including Delgado's, and Adelante Andalucía won two, which combined was less than they won in 2018 as the first Adelante Andalucía.

In September 2025, Por Andalucía was renewed as the IU and Sumar, without Podemos, thereby leaving three electoral lists in the 2026 Andalusian regional election that would be to the left of the Spanish Socialist Workers' Party (PSOE). At the end of November, he was confirmed as Podemos's lead candidate in those elections, with 87.29% of the vote. On 3 April 2026, Podemos was integrated back into Por Andalucía for the upcoming elections.
