= Inmaculada Nieto =

Spanish politician (born 1971)

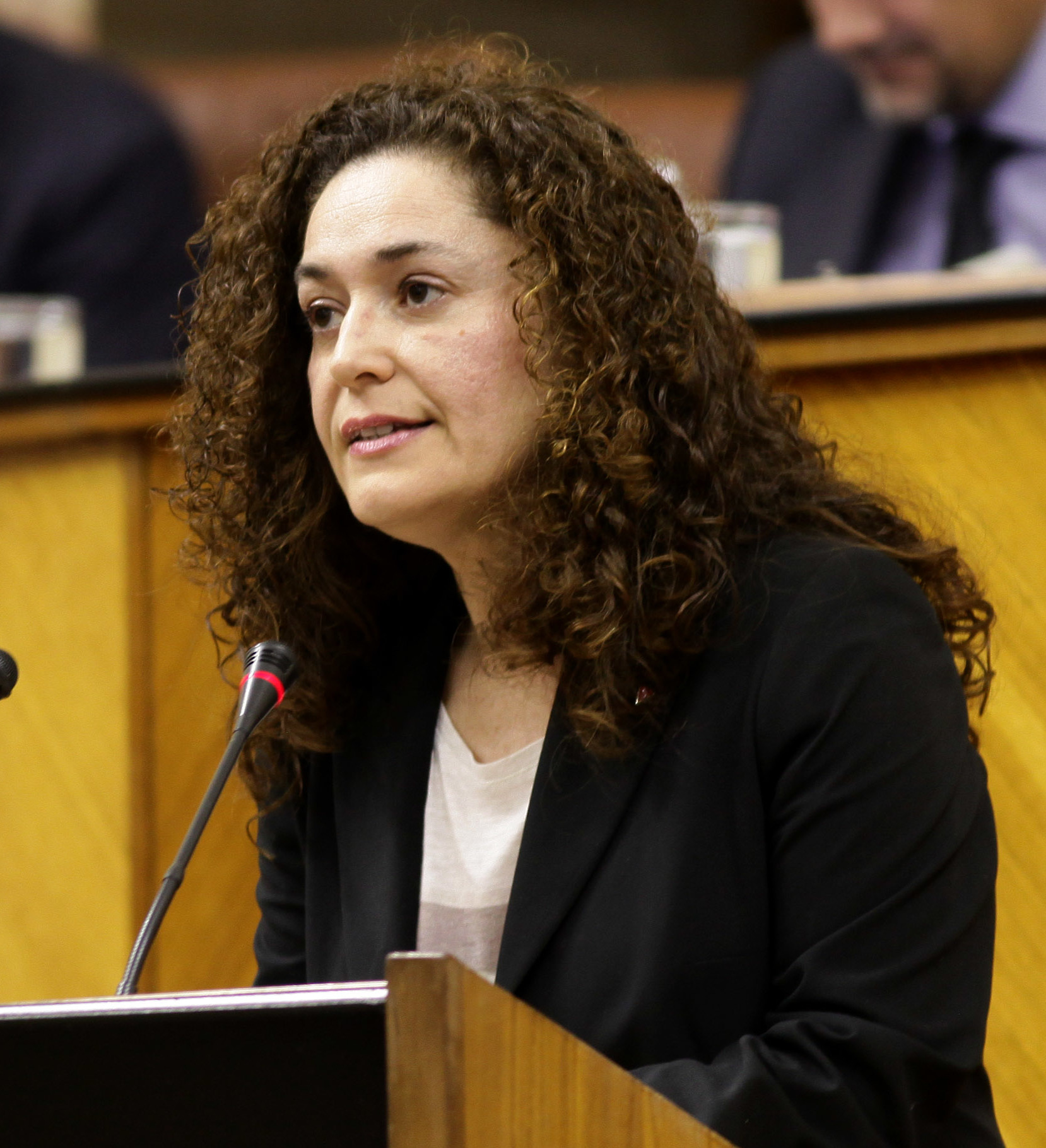

Inmaculada Nieto Castro (born 15 March 1971) is a Spanish politician of the United Left (IU). She has been a deputy in the Parliament of Andalusia since 2012, and spokesperson of her party in parliament since 2019, within the coalitions of Adelante Andalucía (2018), Unidas Podemos and Por Andalucía.

== Biography ==
Born in Algeciras, province of Cádiz, Nieto graduated in political sciences from the University of Granada and obtained a master's degree in public administration. She was a staff member for the United Left (IU) in the Algeciras City Hall from 1997 to 2007, when she was elected deputy mayor, also being Councillor for Culture and Festivals.

In March 2012, Nieto was elected to the Parliament of Andalusia for United Left/The Greens–Assembly for Andalusia (IULV–CA), representing the province of Cádiz. She left her municipal office in September 2016.

Nieto succeeded Antonio Maíllo as spokesperson for Adelante Andalucía in June 2019, upon his resignation. After Teresa Rodríguez was expelled from member party Podemos, she founded a separate coalition named Adelante Andalucía; Nieto threatened action over the name. The first Adelante Andalucía rebranded as Unidas Podemos, with Nieto still the spokesperson.

Unidas Podemos took part in the 2022 Andalusian regional election, with Nieto as lead candidate and under the name Por Andalucía. Compared to the 17 seats taken by the first Adelante Andalucía in 2018, its successors took 7 in 2022 – five for Nieto's coalition and two from Rodríguez's.
