= Martina Velarde =

Spanish politician

Martina Velarde Gómez
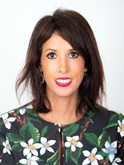

Member of Spanish Parliament
- Incumbent
- Assumed office 17 August 2023
- Constituency: Granada
- In office 21 May 2019 – 29 May 2023
- Constituency: Córdoba

Personal details
- Born: 14 April 1979 (age 47) Rota, Province of Cádiz ,Spain
- Party: Podemos
- Education: University of Granada
- Occupation: Lawyer ,Politician

Martina Velarde Gómez is a Spanish lawyer and politician who has served as a member of the Spanish Parliament since May 21, 2019.

Velarde has served as the Secretary-General of Podemos Andalusia since 2020.
