= Por Andalucía =

For Andalusia Por Andalucía
- Founded: 25 April 2022
- Merger of: Unidas Podemos por Andalucía; Andaluces Levantaos
- Preceded by: Adelante Andalucía
- Ideology: Progressivism; Green politics Regionalism
- Political position: Left-wing
- Members: See list of members
- Parliament of Andalusia: 5 / 109

Website
- porandalucia.org

Por Andalucía (English: "For Andalusia") is the name of two different Andalusian-based electoral alliances created to contest the 2022 and the 2026 Andalusian regional elections.

== 2022 regional election ==
In its first iteration, the alliance was launched after over two months of negotiations between the parties to the left of the Spanish Socialist Workers' Party of Andalusia (PSOE–A), in an attempt to form a joint list that avoided wasted votes; however, both the new Adelante Andalucía party of Teresa Rodríguez, as well as Andalucía por Sí (AxSí)—which had been a founding member of the Andaluces Levantaos alliance between Más País, IdPA and itself—rejected joining in.

An early agreement was concluded in late March 2022, and by April 2022 the new joint alliance of all these parties (with the exception of Adelante Andalucía and AxSí) was given the name Por Andalucía (Spanish for "For Andalusia"),. Controversy ensued as the role Podemos would play in the coalition, if any, became unclear. This conflict became more evident when the party presented its own prospective candidate, Juan Antonio Delgado, with no guarantees of participating in the coalition being given. A last-minute electoral coalition was reached between Podemos, IULV–CA, Greens Equo, Green Alliance (AV), Más País and Andalusian People's Initiative (IdPA), but because Podemos and AV failed to file the required documentation ahead of the legal deadline, both parties found themselves unable to be awarded full party rights within the coalition. The coalition partners downplayed the impact of that administrative decision as a 'technicality' that would not affect the course of the campaign.

The alliance obtained 7.68 per cent of the vote and 5 seats in the Andalusian Parliament. Three of them went for Podemos candidates, elected as independents in Cádiz, Córdoba and Granada due to the administrative delays in the legal formation of the coalition, one for Más País Andalucía in Seville and another one for IULV-CA in Cádiz. The seat totals were the worst ever for the Andalusian federation of United Left, with the Communist Party of Andalusia losing all parliamentary representation for the first time since the 1982 regional elections.

== 2026 regional election ==
The creation of Sumar, a platform including most of the constituent parties of Por Andalucía, had no immediate effect on the alliance's internal affairs and political action, in spite of the tensions and the eventual split between Podemos and the rest of the coalition on a national level in December 2023.

In July 2025, Más País Andalucía disbanded and became the regional affiliate of Movimiento Sumar (SMR). In October 2025, SMR and IULV-CA registered a political party under the Por Andalucía banner to gain ownership of the brand in anticipation of early elections, which led to further tensions and the threat of a definitive split between those groups and Podemos. The alliance collapsed after IULV-CA, SMR and IdPA announced their intention to coalesce around Antonio Maíllo, chosen as their lead candidate, on 20 November 2025. Nine days later, Podemos confirmed it would field separate lists in all provinces and that Juan Antonio Delgado would be the party's candidate for regional president; on 1 December, he called for the exclusion of Movimiento Sumar as a precondition for the participation of Podemos in any electoral alliance.

The new alliance's first political event took place on 13 February 2026; Maíllo was officially introduced as the coalition's candidate and an updated graphic identity combining the rainbow-shaped symbol of the 2022 election and the flag of Andalusia was unveiled. On 19 February 2026, the alliance announced that Republican Alternative (ALTER) would also be a part of the coalition.

After a snap election was called by regional president Juanma Moreno on 23 March 2026, Verdes Equo announced its participation in the alliance on 31 March. Meanwhile, and as a result of the party's poor performance in the 2026 Castilian-Leonese regional election, Podemos launched an internal election in order to decide whether the party should contest the election under the Por Andalucía banner, with 81.7 per cent of party members supporting the participation in the alliance.

== Composition ==
Party	Notes
United Left/The Greens–Assembly for Andalusia (IULV–CA)	
More Country Andalusia (Más País–Andalucía)	Dissolved in 2024
Greens Equo (Verdes Equo)	
Andalusian People's Initiative (IdPA)	
We Can (Podemos)	
Green Alliance (AV)	
Unite Movement (MS)	Joined in 2024
Republican Alternative (ALTER)	Joined in 2026

== Electoral performance ==
=== Parliament of Andalusia ===
Parliament of Andalusia
Election	Leading candidate	Votes	%	Seats	Gov.
2022	Inmaculada Nieto	284,027	7.7 (#4)	5 / 109	No
2026	Antonio Maíllo	266,213	6.3 (#5)	5 / 109	No

== Symbols ==
Official logo, 2022–2026

Official logo, 2026–present
