= Podemos Andalusia =

Podemos Andalusia Podemos Andalucía
- Secretary General: Martina Velarde
- Founded: 17 January 2014
- Headquarters: C/ Gonzalo Bilbao, 23-25 Seville, Andalusia
- Ideology: Left-wing populism Anticapitalism
- Political position: Left-wing
- National affiliation: Podemos
- Regional affiliation: Adelante Andalucía (2018–2020); Por Andalucía (since 2022)
- Colours: Purple
- Parliament of Andalusia: 0 / 109
- Congress of Deputies (Andalusian seats): 1 / 61

Website
- www.andalucia.podemos.info

Podemos Andalusia (Spanish: Podemos Andalucía) is the regional branch of Podemos in Andalusia, Spain. In the primary election which concluded on 14 February 2015, Teresa Rodríguez was elected to be the secretary.

At the Andalusian regional election, 2015, the party obtained 15 deputies.

== Electoral performance ==
=== Parliament of Andalusia ===
Parliament of Andalusia
Election	Leading candidate	Votes	%	Seats	+/–	Government
2015	Teresa Rodríguez	592,133	14.86 (#3)	15 / 109	15	Opposition
2018 (Note: Within Forward Andalusia.)	Teresa Rodríguez	Within Adelante		12 / 109	3	Opposition
2022 (Note: Within For Andalusia.)	Inmaculada Nieto	Within PorA		3 / 109	9	Opposition
2026 (Note: Within For Andalusia.)	Antonio Maíllo	Within PorA		0 / 109	3	Opposition

=== Cortes Generales ===
==== Andalusia ====
Congress of Deputies
Date	Votes			Seats		Size
Date	#	%	±pp	#	±	Size
2015	752,367	16.9%	+16.9	10 / 61	10	3rd
2016	792,008	18.6%	N/A	11 / 61	1	*
2019 (Apr)	654,944	14.3%	N/A	9 / 61	2	*
2019 (Nov)	555,902	13.1%	N/A	6 / 61	3	*

Senate
Date	Seats		Size
Date	#	±	Size
2015	0 / 32	0	3rd
2016	0 / 32	0	*
2019 (Apr)	0 / 32	0	*
2019 (Nov)	0 / 32	0	*

- * Within Unidos Podemos for Andalusia.

=== European Parliament ===
Andalusia
Date	Votes			Size
Date	#	%	±pp	Size
2014	190,465	7.1%	+7.1	5th
2019	442,917	11.6%	N/A	*

- * Within Unidas Podemos Cambiar Europa.

== Symbols ==
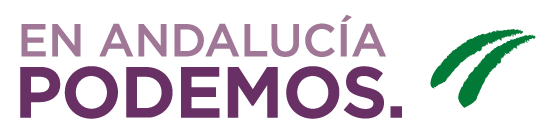
Logo from 2014 to May 2020.
