= 2022 Andalusian regional election =

Election in the Spanish region of Andalusia

- 19 June 2022

All 109 seats in the Parliament of Andalusia 55 seats needed for a majority
- Opinion polls
- Registered: 6,641,903 ▲1.5%
- Turnout: 3,728,155 (56.1%) ▼0.5 pp
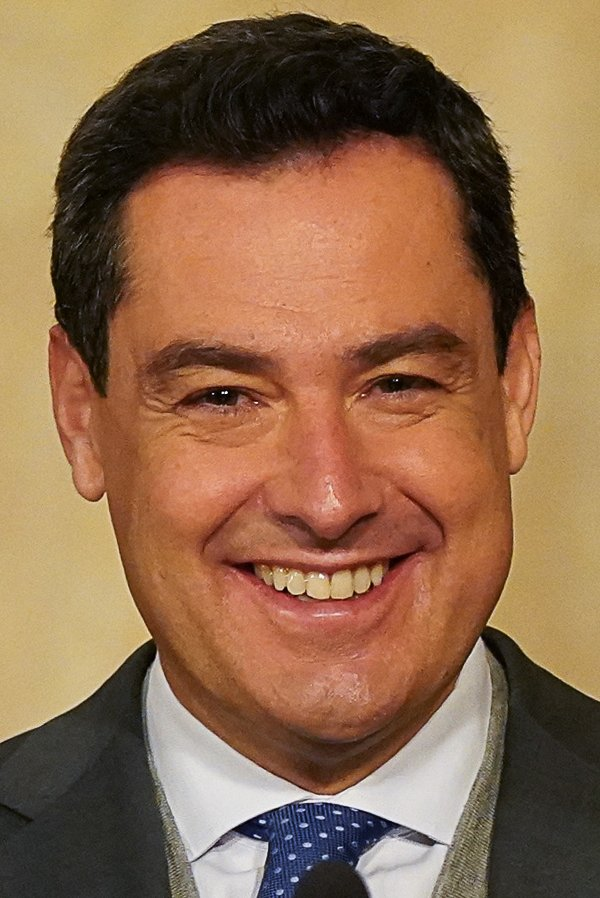

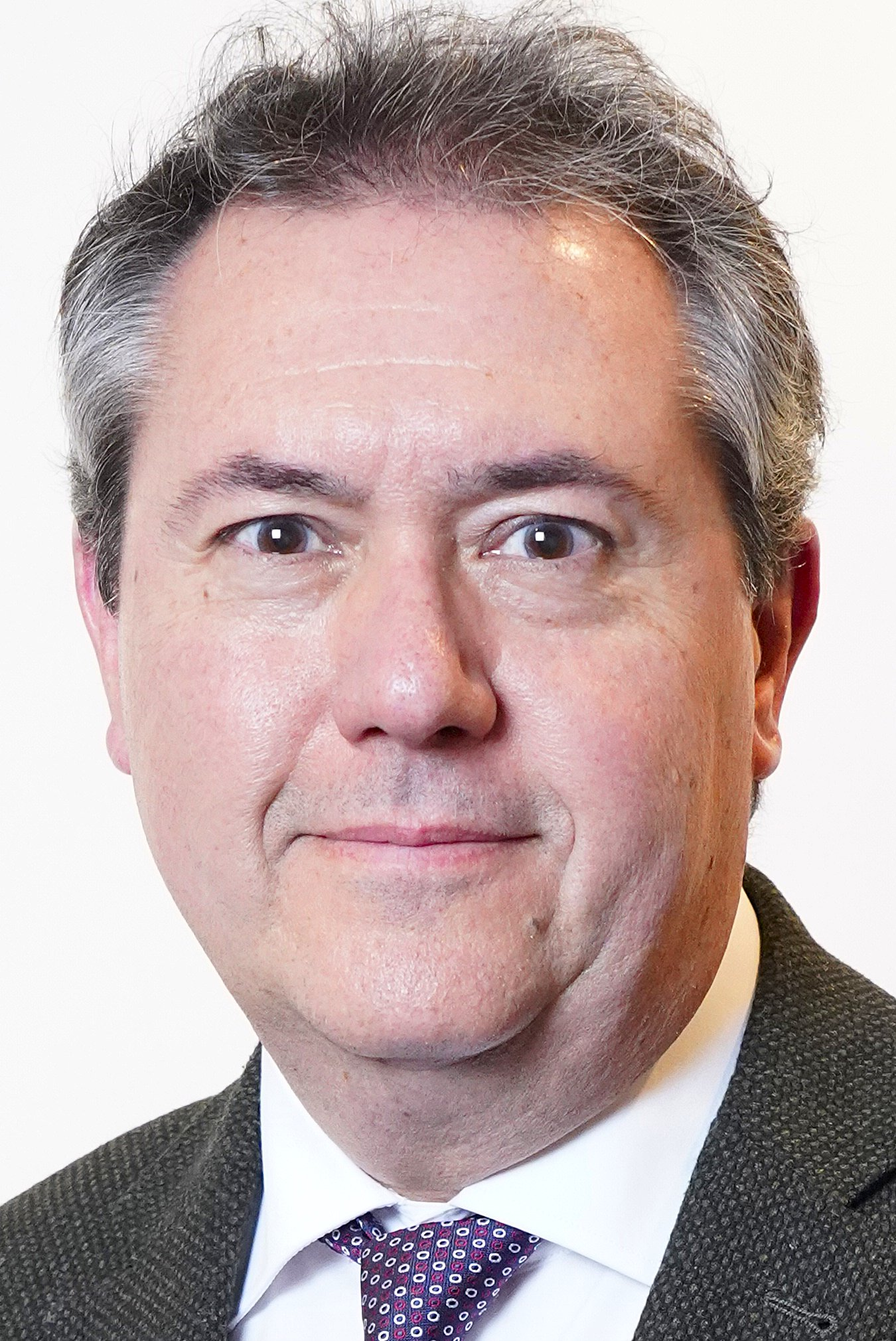

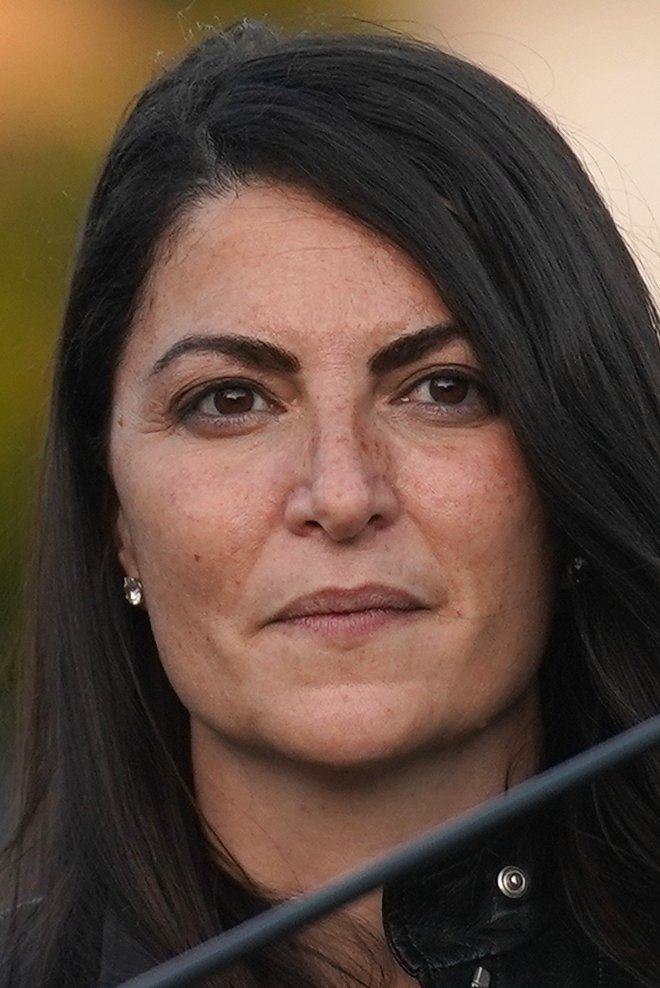

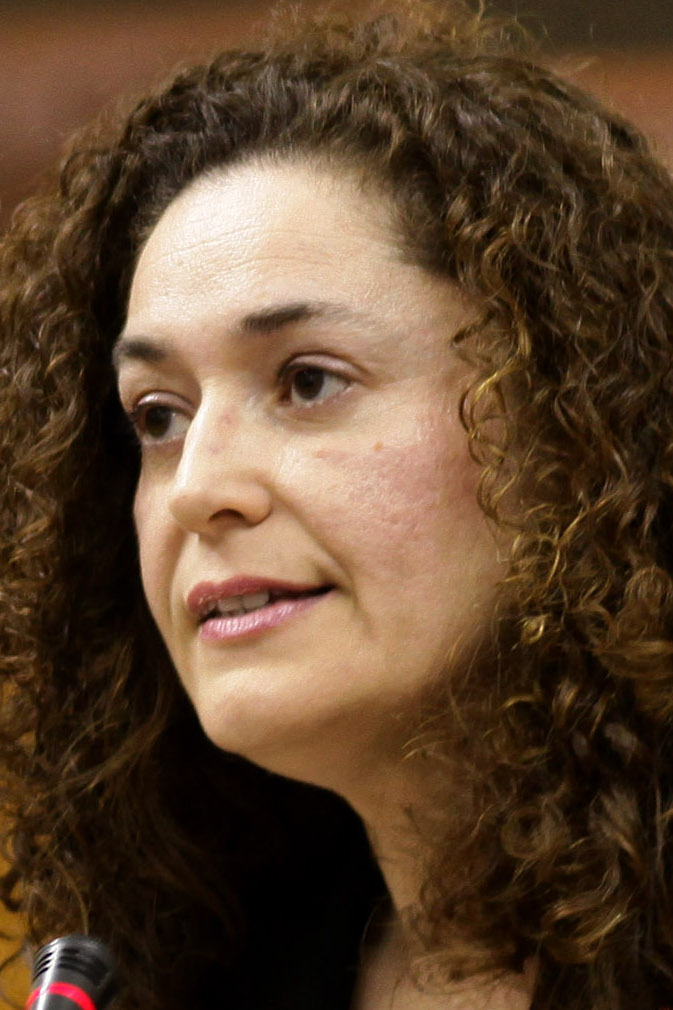

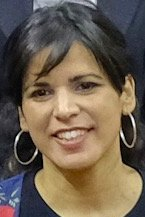

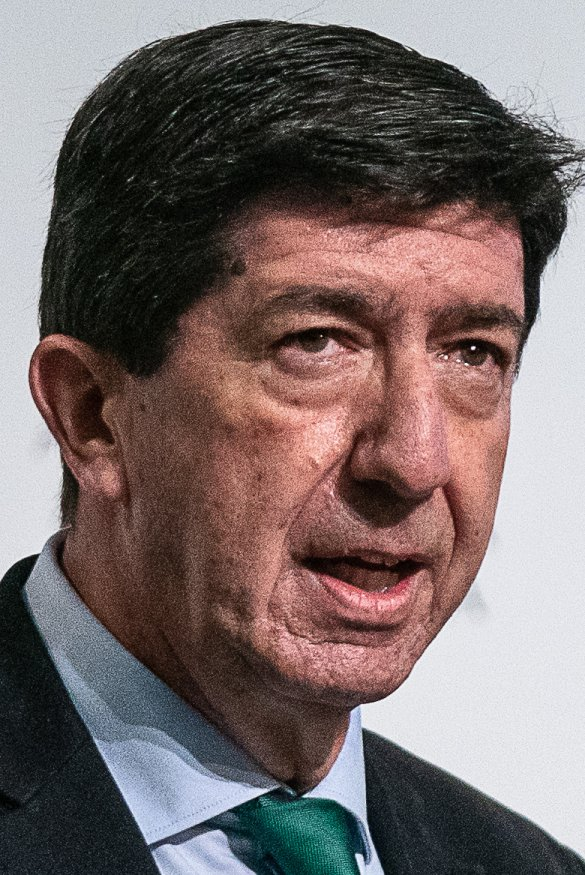
	First party	Second party	Third party
Leader	Juanma Moreno	Juan Espadas	Macarena Olona
Party	PP	PSOE–A	Vox
Leader since	1 March 2014	17 June 2021	28 April 2022
Leader's seat	Málaga	Seville	Granada
Last election	26 seats, 20.7%	33 seats, 27.9%	12 seats, 11.0%
Seats won	58	30	14
Seat change	▲32	▼3	▲2
Popular vote	1,589,272	888,325	496,618
Percentage	43.1%	24.1%	13.5%
Swing	▲22.4 pp	▼3.8 pp	▲2.5 pp
	Fourth party	Fifth party	Sixth party
Leader	Inmaculada Nieto	Teresa Rodríguez	Juan Marín
Party	PorA	Adelante Andalucía	Cs
Leader since	7 May 2022	26 June 2021	6 February 2015
Leader's seat	Málaga	Cádiz	Seville
Last election	5 seats (AA) (Note: Within the Adelante Andalucía alliance in the 2018 election.)	12 seats (AA)	21 seats, 18.3%
Seats won	5	2	0
Seat change	0	▼10	▼21
Popular vote	284,027	168,960	121,567
Percentage	7.7%	4.6%	3.3%
Swing	n/a	n/a	▼15.0 pp
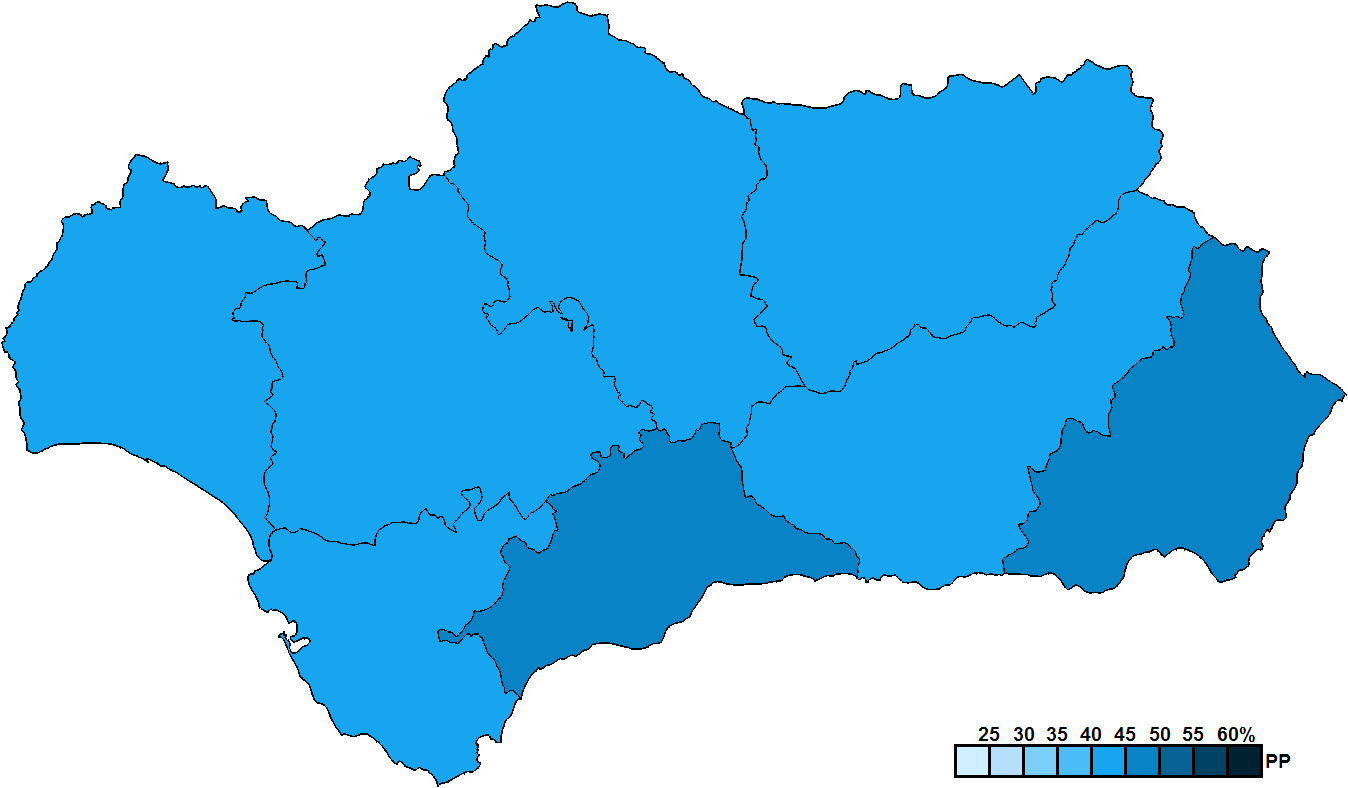
President before election
Juanma Moreno
PP
President after election
Juanma Moreno
PP

A regional election was held in Andalusia on 19 June 2022 to elect the 12th Parliament of the autonomous community. All 109 seats in the Parliament were up for election.

The 2018 election resulted in the first majority for right-of-centre parties in Andalusia in 36 years, paving the way for an alternative government to the Spanish Socialist Workers' Party of Andalusia (PSOE–A) despite the party remaining the most voted political force in the region. As a result, Juanma Moreno of the People's Party (PP) unseated PSOE's Susana Díaz as regional president, forming a coalition with Citizens (Cs), with confidence and supply from the Vox party. A number of disagreements saw Vox withdraw its support from the PP–Cs government in May 2021 and reject its proposed 2022 budget in November. Concurrently, Susana Díaz was replaced as regional PSOE leader by Seville mayor Juan Espadas in June 2021.

The election saw a landslide victory for the PP under a low turnout, with incumbent president Moreno being re-elected. The PP won in all eight provinces in Andalusia, with Seville flipping from the PSOE to the PP for the first time in Spanish democracy. In total, the PP took 58 of the 109 seats in Parliament, an increase of 32 from their 2018 result and an absolute majority of seats that was the first in its history, while taking 43% of the vote (up 22 points from the last election). The PSOE, which for the first time in history contested a regional election in Andalusia from opposition, got its worst result ever in the autonomous community, while Vox failed to fulfil expectations and saw only modest gains. Support for Cs collapsed, with the party being left out of parliament, whereas the left-wing vote divided between the For Andalusia (PorA) and Forward Andalusia (Adelante Andalucía) platforms.

== Overview ==
Under the 2007 Statute of Autonomy, the Parliament of Andalusia was the unicameral legislature of the homonymous autonomous community, having legislative power in devolved matters, as well as the ability to grant or withdraw confidence from a regional president. The electoral and procedural rules were supplemented by national law provisions.

=== Date ===
The term of the Parliament of Andalusia expired four years after the date of its previous election, unless it was dissolved earlier. The election decree was required to be issued no later than 25 days before the scheduled expiration date of parliament and published on the following day in the Official Gazette of the Regional Government of Andalusia (BOJA), with election day taking place 54 days after the decree's publication (barring any date within from 1 July to 31 August). The previous election was held on 2 December 2018, which meant that the chamber's term would have expired on 2 December 2022. The election decree was required to be published in the BOJA no later than 8 November 2022, setting the latest possible date for election day on 1 January 2023.

The regional president had the prerogative to dissolve the Parliament of Andalusia at any given time and call a snap election, provided that no motion of no confidence was in process and that dissolution did not occur before one year after a previous one. In the event of an investiture process failing to elect a regional president within a two-month period from the first ballot, the Parliament was to be automatically dissolved and a fresh election called.

In the aftermath of the May 2021 border crisis between Morocco and Spain, Vox announced it would end its confidence and supply arrangement with the PP–Cs ruling coalition after it became known that the authorities had agreed to take custody of 13 unaccompanied minors from Ceuta. This made the prospect of a snap election likelier, particularly following the gains achieved by the PP in the 2021 Madrilenian regional election at the expense of Cs. The Andalusian government initially responded by indicating a tentative date for the next election of Sunday, 27 November 2022, in order to dispel any rumours about the instability of the governing coalition. In November 2021, amid concerns that parliamentary negotiations would fail to deliver a budget for 2022 due to opposition from both the PSOE–A and Vox, it was suggested that a snap election would be called for either 27 February or 6 March, coinciding with the festivities of Andalusia Day. Together with speculation on an early election in Castile and León to be held in the spring of 2022, it was initially suggested that the two elections could be held simultaneously. On 30 November, several days after his 2022 budget was voted down by the parliament, President Juanma Moreno announced that an early election would be held but that his will was to set the election date for either June or October 2022, which meant that the Castilian-Leonese election, finally called for 13 February, would be held earlier. On 19 January 2022, Moreno announced that he would make up his mind about a snap election "throughout February", with an early dissolution that month bringing the regional election date to either April or May. The negative PP results and Vox's breakthrough in Castile and León forced a coalition government between the two in the region, leading Moreno's government to temporarily put any plans for a snap election on hold, with the originally scheduled date of 27 November returning to the spotlight.

The appointment of Alberto Núñez Feijóo as new national PP leader on 2 April 2022—replacing Pablo Casado—sparked renewed electoral interest in Andalusia, culminating in Moreno's announcement on 24 April that the regional election would be held before the summer. The following day it was confirmed that it would be held on 19 June, with the dissolution of parliament imminent. The Parliament of Andalusia was officially dissolved on 26 April 2022 with the publication of the corresponding decree in the BOJA, setting election day for 19 June and scheduling for the chamber to reconvene on 14 July.

=== Electoral system ===
Voting for the Parliament was based on universal suffrage, comprising all Spanish nationals over 18 years of age, registered in Andalusia and with full political rights, provided that they had not been deprived of the right to vote by a final sentence. (Note: Amendments in 2018 granted the right to vote to those legally incapacitated.) Additionally, non-resident citizens were required to apply for voting, a system known as "begged" voting (Spanish: Voto rogado).

The Parliament of Andalusia had a minimum of 109 seats, with electoral provisions fixing its size at that number. All were elected in eight multi-member constituencies—corresponding to the provinces of Almería, Cádiz, Córdoba, Granada, Huelva, Jaén, Málaga and Seville, each of which was assigned an initial minimum of eight seats and the remaining 45 distributed in proportion to population (with the number of seats in each province not exceeding two times that of any other)—using the D'Hondt method and closed-list proportional voting, with a three percent-threshold of valid votes (including blank ballots) in each constituency. The use of this electoral method resulted in a higher effective threshold depending on district magnitude and vote distribution.

As a result of the aforementioned allocation, each Parliament constituency was entitled the following seats:

Seats	Constituencies
18	Seville
17	Málaga
15	Cádiz
13	Granada
12	Almería, Córdoba
11	Huelva, Jaén

The law did not provide for by-elections to fill vacant seats; instead, any vacancies arising after the proclamation of candidates and during the legislative term were filled by the next candidates on the party lists or, when required, by designated substitutes.

=== Outgoing parliament ===
The table below shows the composition of the parliamentary groups in the chamber at the time of dissolution.

Parliamentary composition in April 2022
Groups	Parties	Legislators	
Groups	Parties	Seats	Total
Socialist Parliamentary Group	PSOE–A	33	33
Andalusian People's Parliamentary Group	PP	26	26
Citizens Parliamentary Group	Cs	21	21
Vox Parliamentary Group in Andalusia	Vox	11	11
United We Can for Andalusia; Parliamentary Group	IULV–CA	6	6
Non-Inscrits	Adelante Andalucía	11 (Note: Teresa Rodríguez, Ángela Aguilera, José Ignacio García, Luz Marina Dorado, María Vanessa García, María Gracia González, Ignacio Molina, Diego Crespo, Ana Villaverde, María Isabel Mora and María del Carmen García, former Podemos legislators.)	12
Non-Inscrits	FE de las JONS	1 (Note: Luz Belinda Rodríguez, former Vox legislator.)	12

== Parties and candidates ==
The electoral law allowed for parties and federations registered in the interior ministry, alliances and groupings of electors to present lists of candidates. Parties and federations intending to form an alliance were required to inform the relevant electoral commission within 10 days of the election call, whereas groupings of electors needed to secure the signature of at least one percent of the electorate in the constituencies for which they sought election, disallowing electors from signing for more than one list. Additionally, a balanced composition of men and women was required in the electoral lists through the use of a zipper system.

Below is a list of the main parties and alliances which contested the election:

Candidacy	Parties and alliances	Leading candidate	Ideology	Previous result		Gov.	Ref.
Candidacy	Parties and alliances	Leading candidate	Ideology	Vote %	Seats	Gov.	Ref.
PSOE–A	List: Spanish Socialist Workers' Party of Andalusia (PSOE–A)	Juan Espadas	Social democracy	27.9%	33	No	
PP	List: People's Party (PP)	Juanma Moreno	Conservatism; Christian democracy	20.7%	26	Yes	
Cs	List: Citizens–Party of the Citizenry (Cs)	Juan Marín	Liberalism	18.3%	21	Yes	
PorA	List: United Left/The Greens–Assembly for Andalusia (IULV–CA) – Communist Party of Andalusia (PCA) – The Dawn Marxist Organization (La Aurora (OM)) – Republican Left (IR); Greens Equo (Verdes Equo); More Country Andalusia (Más País–Andalucía); Andalusian People's Initiative (IdPA); We Can (Podemos) (Note: Podemos and Green Alliance were a part of the alliance agreement, but failed to register before the 6 May deadline to be part of the joint electoral candidacy. As a result, while both parties remain politically a part of the alliance, they are unable to legally contest the election as parties within it.); Green Alliance (AV)	Inmaculada Nieto	Left-wing populism Green politics	16.6% (Note: Results for Adelante Andalucía (16.2%, 17 seats) and Equo–Iniciativa (0.4%, 0 seats) in the 2018 election.)	17	No	
Adelante; Andalucía	List: Anti-capitalists (Anticapitalistas); Andalusian Spring (Primavera Andaluza); Andalusian Left (IzA); Defend Andalusia (Defender Andalucía)	Teresa Rodríguez	Andalusian nationalism Left-wing populism Anti-capitalism	16.6%	17	No	
Vox	List: Vox (Vox)	Macarena Olona	Right-wing populism Ultranationalism; National conservatism	11.0%	12	No	

In September 2021, citizen collectives of the so-called "Empty Spain" (Spanish: España Vacía or España Vaciada), a coined term to refer to Spain's rural and largely unpopulated interior provinces, agreed to look for formulas to contest the next elections in Spain, inspired by the success of the Teruel Existe candidacy (Spanish for "Teruel Exists") in the November 2019 Spanish general election. By March 2022, the platform had announced that it would contest the Andalusian election in at least the Granada and Jaén provinces. However, in May the platform ruled out a candidacy in Granada, and only filed candidates in Jaén within the platform Jaén Merece Más (Spanish for "Jaén Deserves More").

In light of the party's negative outlook in recent opinion polls, Citizens (Cs) did not rule out establishing an electoral alliance with the People's Party (PP) to ease the prospects for a renewal of their coalition government, with such possibility being suggested by both the national and regional leaders of the party, Inés Arrimadas and Juan Marín, on 4 December 2021. The PP's national leadership rejected this possibility in the following days, which contrasted with the regional branch of the party being willing to study a merger between the two parties ahead of a regional election.

In December 2021, Más País, Greens Equo, Andalusia by Herself (AxSí) and Andalusian People's Initiative (IdPA) had agreed in a common platform—dubbed as Andaluces Levantaos, "Arise Andalusians", a reference to the Andalusian anthem—to contest the election. On 2 February 2022, it was revealed that Podemos, United Left/The Greens–Assembly for Andalusia (IULV–CA), Adelante Andalucía and the Andaluces Levantaos's parties had started talks to probe a prospective electoral alliance of all various parties to the left wing of the PSOE, in which each would retain a degree of autonomy in parliament, in order to prevent a severe vote dispersion that would deprive them of many seats. An early agreement was concluded in late March 2022, and by April 2022 that the new joint alliance of all these parties (with the exception of Adelante Andalucía and AxSí) would be named as Por Andalucía (Spanish for "For Andalusia"), for which Podemos suggested its Congress deputy Juan Antonio Delgado as the prospective candidate. In the end, an electoral alliance was agreed between Podemos, IULV–CA, Greens Equo, Green Alliance (AV), Más País and IdPA, but because Podemos and AV failed to fill the required documentation ahead of the legal deadline, both parties found themselves unable to be awarded full party rights within the coalition.

In May 2022, the town council in Salobreña in the province of Granada struck the name of Vox candidate Macarena Olona from its electoral roll after a recording emerged of former Vox Granada president Manuel Martín saying that she was registered at one of his properties without living there regularly or having a rental contract. She was still allowed to stand as a candidate by the province's electoral board. Olona reported the town's PSOE mayor, María Eugenia Rufino González, to the Guardia Civil for alleged abuse of office and deprivation of the right to vote.

== Campaign ==
=== Timetable ===
The key dates are listed below (all times are CET):

- 25 April: The election decree is issued with the countersign of the president, after deliberation in the Council of Government.
- 26 April: Formal dissolution of parliament and start of prohibition period on the inauguration of public works, services or projects.
- 29 April: Initial constitution of provincial and zone electoral commissions with judicial members.
- 2 May: Division of constituencies into polling sections and stations.
- 6 May: Deadline for parties and federations to report on their electoral alliances.
- 9 May: Deadline for electoral register consultation for the purpose of possible corrections.
- 16 May: Deadline for parties, federations, alliances, and groupings of electors to present electoral lists.
- 18 May: Publication of submitted electoral lists in the Official Gazette of the Regional Government of Andalusia (BOJA).
- 21 May: Deadline for non-resident citizens (electors residing abroad (CERA) and citizens temporarily absent from Spain) to apply for voting.
- 23 May: Official proclamation of validly submitted electoral lists.
- 24 May: Publication of proclaimed electoral lists in the BOJA.
- 25 May: Deadline for the selection of polling station members by sortition.
- 2 June: Deadline for the appointment of non-judicial members to provincial and zone electoral commissions.
- 3 June: Official start of electoral campaigning.
- 9 June: Deadline to apply for postal voting.
- 14 June: Start of legal ban on electoral opinion polling publication; deadline for CERA citizens to vote by mail.
- 15 June: Deadline for postal and temporarily absent voting.
- 17 June: Last day of electoral campaigning; deadline for CERA voting.
- 18 June: Official election silence ("reflection day").
- 19 June: Election day (polling stations open at 9 am and close at 8 pm or once voters present in a queue at/outside the polling station at 8 pm have cast their vote); provisional vote counting.
- 22 June: Start of general vote counting, including CERA votes.
- 25 June: Deadline for the general vote counting.
- 4 July: Deadline for the proclamation of elected members.
- 14 July: Deadline for the reconvening of parliament (date determined by the election decree, which for the 2022 election was set for 14 July).
- 13 August: Deadline for the publication of definitive election results in the BOJA.

=== Party slogans ===
Party or alliance	Original slogan	English translation	Ref.
PSOE–A	« Andalucía quiere más » « Si votamos, ganamos »	"Andalusia wants more" "If we vote, we win"	
PP	« Andalucía avanza »	"Andalusia moves forward"	
Cs	« Andalucía, el cambio que funciona »	"Andalusia, the change that works"	
Vox	« Cambio real »	"Real change"	
PorA	« Por Andalucía »	"For Andalusia"	
Adelante Andalucía	« En defensa propia »	"In self-defense"	

=== Debates ===
2022 Andalusian regional election debates
Date	Organizer(s)	Moderator(s)	P Present (Note: Denotes a main invitee attending the event.) S Surrogate (Note: Denotes a main invitee not attending the event, sending a surrogate in their place.) NI Not invited I Invited A Absent invitee							
Date	Organizer(s)	Moderator(s)	PSOE–A	PP	Cs	PorA	Vox	Adelante	Audience	Ref.
6 June	RTVE	Paloma Jara; Xabier Fortes	P Espadas	P Moreno	P Marín	P Nieto	P Olona	P Rodríguez	541,000 (20.8%) (Note: In Andalusia, the debate was broadcast on La 1 (414,000; 15.9%), Andalucía Televisión (84,000; 3.2%) and 24 Horas (43,000; 1.7%). Nationwide, the debate was broadcast on La 1 (1,035,000; 8.1%) and 24 Horas (144,000; 1.1%))	
13 June	RTVA	Blanca Rodríguez; Fernando García	P Espadas	P Moreno	P Marín	P Nieto	P Olona	P Rodríguez	328,000 (13.9%)	

Opinion polls

Candidate viewed as "performing best" or "most convincing" in each debate
Debate	Polling firm/Commissioner	PSOE	PP	Cs	Vox	AA	PorA	Tie	None	Question
6 June	Data10/Okdiario	24.6	34.2	6.6	20.7	3.4	10.5	–	–	–

== Opinion polls ==
The tables below list opinion polling results in reverse chronological order, showing the most recent first and using the dates when the survey fieldwork was done, as opposed to the date of publication. Where the fieldwork dates are unknown, the date of publication is given instead. The highest percentage figure in each polling survey is displayed with its background shaded in the leading party's colour. If a tie ensues, this is applied to the figures with the highest percentages. The "Lead" column on the right shows the percentage-point difference between the parties with the highest percentages in a poll.

=== Graphical summary ===
Local regression trend line of poll results from 2 December 2018 to 19 June 2022, with each line corresponding to a political party.

=== Voting intention estimates ===
The table below lists weighted voting intention estimates. Refusals are generally excluded from the party vote percentages, while question wording and the treatment of "don't know" responses and those not intending to vote may vary between polling organisations. When available, seat projections determined by the polling organisations are also displayed below (or in place of) the voting estimates in a smaller font; 55 seats were required for an absolute majority in the Parliament of Andalusia.

Color key:

Poll conducted after legal ban on opinion polls Exit poll

Polling firm/Commissioner	Fieldwork date	Sample size	Turnout	PSOE–A	PP	Cs	Adelante Andalucía (2018)	Vox	PACMA	UPxA	Andaluces Levantaos	Adelante Andalucía (2021)	PP+Cs	XH	PorA	JM+	Lead
2022 regional election	19 Jun 2022	—N/a	55.9	24.1; 30	43.1; 58	3.3; 0	–	13.5; 14	1.0; 0	(Note: Within Por Andalucía.)	0.3; 0	4.6; 2	–	0.1; 0	7.7; 5	0.5; 0	19.0
Data10/Okdiario	19 Jun 2022	1,000	?	24.3; 27/29	38.6; 51/54	3.7; 0/1	–	18.2; 17/20	–		–	5.2; 3/4	–	–	7.2; 5/7	–	14.3
SocioMétrica/El Español	19 Jun 2022	?	?	22.0; 26/29	37.0; 47/50	5.0; 0/3	–	17.0; 17/20	–		–	6.0; 2/4	–	–	9.0; 7/9	–	15.0
Target Point/El Debate	16–19 Jun 2022	1,007	?	24.3; 29/31	40.7; 52/54	2.9; 0/1	–	15.4; 16/18	–		–	4.9; 3/4	–	–	8.0; 6/7	? 0/1	16.4
NC Report/La Razón	15–18 Jun 2022	1,300	57.1	25.6; 31/33	39.4; 48/52	1.9; 0	–	12.6; 15/18	–		–	6.9; 3	–	–	8.0; 6/8	–	13.8
GAD3/Canal Sur	3–18 Jun 2022	9,214	?	22.9; 26/30	44.4; 58/61	2.4; 0	–	13.6; 13/15	–		–	5.5; 3	–	–	6.4; 4/5	–	21.5
PP	17 Jun 2022	?	?	? 28/30	? 50/52	? 2	–	? 14/17	–		–	? 2	–	–	? 8	–	?
Data10/Okdiario	13 Jun 2022	1,000	65	25.3; 29	34.6; 47	4.0; 0	–	20.2; 23	–		–	4.9; 3	–	–	7.9; 7	–	9.3
EM-Analytics/El Plural	12 Jun 2022	?	?	26.6; 32	31.0; 40	5.2; 3	–	20.8; 25	–		–	6.9; 4	–	0.2; 0	7.8; 5	0.4; 0	4.4
SocioMétrica/El Español	8–12 Jun 2022	1,912	?	23.2; 29/31	35.7; 46/48	3.7; 0/2	–	18.9; 20/22	–		–	6.0; 3/5	–	–	8.9; 6/8	–	12.5
Social Data/Grupo Viva	6–11 Jun 2022	2,405	?	22.2; 27/33	38.9; 47/53	4.2; 0/4	–	16.3; 16/22	–		2.0; 0	5.7; 2/6	–	–	7.3; 4/8	–	16.7
EM-Analytics/El Plural	10 Jun 2022	?	?	26.8; 32	30.4; 37	5.4; 3	–	21.0; 27	–		–	6.9; 5	–	0.2; 0	7.6; 5	0.4; 0	3.6
IMOP/El Confidencial	8–10 Jun 2022	1,251	?	22.4; 28/30	39.5; 50/53	3.6; 0/2	–	13.4; 14/16	–		–	5.6; 3/4	–	–	9.6; 8/10	–	17.1
Sigma Dos/El Mundo	7–10 Jun 2022	1,300	?	25.0; 30/33	36.6; 45/52	4.4; 0/2	–	14.9; 15/18	–		–	6.0; 3	–	–	9.7; 8/9	–	11.6
NC Report/La Razón	4–10 Jun 2022	1,300	?	25.0; 31/33	36.8; 48/50	2.7; 0/1	–	14.4; 16/18	–		–	6.1; 3/4	–	–	9.3; 6/8	–	11.8
Thinking Heads	9 Jun 2022	?	?	23.7	36.5	4.5	–	17.9	–		–	8.2	–	–	6.2	–	12.8
Agora Integral/Canarias Ahora	8–9 Jun 2022	1,000	58.1	24.9; 30/33	36.5; 45/47	3.0; 0/2	–	18.5; 19/22	–		–	5.5; 1/3	–	–	7.8; 7/8	–	11.6
GAD3/ABC	7–9 Jun 2022	1,000	?	25.6; 33	41.2; 53	2.2; 0	–	14.1; 16	–		–	5.8; 3	–	–	6.8; 4	–	15.6
Target Point/El Debate	6–9 Jun 2022	1,002	?	25.7; 30/32	35.4; 43/45	3.5; 0/3	–	18.0; 20/22	–		–	4.4; 2/4	–	–	8.9; 8/10	–	9.7
Hamalgama Métrica/VozPópuli	6–9 Jun 2022	1,000	62.0	24.4; 29	37.5; 46	2.4; 0	–	18.1; 22	2.0; 0		0.5; 0	5.5; 3	–	–	8.3; 9	–	13.1
DYM/Henneo	3–9 Jun 2022	2,313	?	24.8; 30/33	35.2; 44/47	4.2; 1/2	–	16.2; 18/19	–		–	6.9; 5/6	–	–	7.9; 6/7	–	10.4
Celeste-Tel/Onda Cero	31 May–9 Jun 2022	1,100	?	25.4; 33	36.9; 49	2.8; 0	–	15.1; 17	–		0.5; 0	6.3; 3	–	–	9.3; 7	–	11.5
Data10/Okdiario	7–8 Jun 2022	1,000	?	25.9; 30	33.8; 43	4.0; 0	–	21.0; 26	–		–	4.7; 3	–	–	7.8; 7	–	7.9
40dB/Prisa	3–8 Jun 2022	1,200	?	25.8; 30/34	36.7; 46/49	3.8; 0	–	16.9; 18/20	–		–	5.3; 2/3	–	–	7.7; 7	–	10.9
CIS	6–7 Jun 2022	3,083	?	23.8– 26.6	35.2– 38.4	3.3– 4.5	–	13.6– 15.8	–		0.6– 1.2	4.5– 5.9	–	–	9.4– 11.4	0.1– 0.3	11.4– 11.8
Celeste-Tel/Onda Cero	6 Jun 2022	?	57.9	? 32	36.3; 45	3.8; 1	–	16.2; 20	2.1; 0		0.7; 0	? 3	–	–	? 8	–	?
EM-Analytics/El Plural	3 Jun 2022	?	?	27.3; 33	30.0; 38	5.4; 3	–	21.4; 27	–		–	6.6; 3	–	0.2; 0	7.6; 5	0.4; 0	2.7
easiest/PSOE	30 May–3 Jun 2022	?	61.7	27.3; 35	32.6; 44	4.1; 1	–	17.1; 18	–		–	4.3; 2	–	–	9.3; 9	–	5.3
NC Report/La Razón	26 May–3 Jun 2022	1,300	64.0	25.9; 31/33	35.0; 45/47	3.8; 1/2	–	15.5; 17/18	–		–	4.1; 3/4	–	–	10.0; 8/9	–	9.1
KeyData/Público	2 Jun 2022	?	57.8	25.7; 32	36.7; 47	3.3; 0	–	17.1; 19	–		–	4.3; 2	–	–	9.0; 9	–	11.0
Data10/Okdiario	1–2 Jun 2022	1,000	?	26.8; 33	33.5; 42	3.6; 0	–	21.2; 26	–		–	4.3; 2	–	–	7.9; 6	–	6.7
Agora Integral/Canarias Ahora	30–31 May 2022	1,000	59.8	24.9; 30/33	36.7; 44/46	3.2; 1/3	–	18.9; 20/23	–		–	4.8; 1/2	–	–	7.9; 8/9	–	11.8
Data10/Okdiario	30 May 2022	?	?	27.2; 34	33.1; 41	? 0	–	21.1; 25	–		–	4.6; 3	–	–	7.8; 6	–	5.9
CIS	17–28 May 2022	7,539	?	25.2; 32/36	35.6; 47/49	4.1; 1/3	–	15.3; 17/21	–		2.0; 0	4.7; 2	–	0.2; 0	9.7; 9/10	0.7; 0/1	10.4
PP	26 May 2022	?	?	? 30	? 49	? 4	–	? 17	–		–	? 1	–	–	? 8	–	?
SocioMétrica/El Español	24–26 May 2022	1,000	?	24.7; 30	35.7; 47	3.1; 0	–	19.4; 22	–		0.9; 0	4.1; 1	–	–	9.8; 9	–	11.0
Sigma Dos/El Mundo	23–26 May 2022	1,300	?	25.4; 30/32	36.1; 46/50	4.9; 2/3	–	15.1; 16/17	–		–	4.8; 2	–	–	10.5; 8/10	–	10.7
EM-Analytics/El Plural	12 Apr–25 May 2022	5,000	?	28.3; 33	29.2; 36	5.5; 3	–	21.2; 27	–		–	6.7; 5	–	0.2; 0	7.7; 5	0.4; 0	0.9
40dB/Prisa	18–23 May 2022	1,200	?	26.0; 33	36.5; 46/48	3.0; 0	–	16.4; 18	–		–	6.0; 3/4	–	–	8.6; 7/8	–	10.5
KeyData/Público	19 May 2022	?	57.9	27.0; 33	35.2; 46	3.8; 0	–	17.0; 20	–		–	4.1; 2	–	–	8.7; 8	–	8.2
Data10/Okdiario	18–19 May 2022	1,000	66	27.1; 34	33.8; 41	? 0	–	19.8; 25	–		–	4.3; 2	–	–	8.2; 7	–	6.7
Metroscopia	17–19 May 2022	1,400	?	27.0; 32/33	36.8; 45/46	2.5; 0	–	18.8; 19/20	–		–	2.5; 1	–	–	10.5; 10	–	9.8
EM-Analytics/El Plural	12–19 May 2022	4,059	?	28.4; 33	29.1; 36	5.1; 3	–	20.9; 26	–		–	6.6; 5	–	0.2; 0	8.4; 6	0.4; 0	0.7
Data10/Okdiario	14–15 May 2022	1,000	66	27.1; 34	34.1; 42	? 0	–	19.5; 24	–		–	4.0; 2	–	–	8.5; 7	–	7.0
CENTRA/CEA	3–13 May 2022	4,500	59.7	24.2; 31/32	39.2; 47/49	4.8; 1/2	–	17.3; 21/23	–		–	3.6; 1	–	–	6.6; 5	–	15.0
EM-Analytics/El Plural	6 Apr–12 May 2022	3,350	?	28.2; 33	28.9; 36	5.2; 3	–	21.1; 27	–		–	6.1; 3	–	0.2; 0	9.0; 7	0.4; 0	0.7
Sigma Dos/Antena 3	8 May 2022	?	?	26.4; 32/33	35.9; 48/49	4.2; 0/1	–	14.7; 16/17	–		–	4.6; 2	–	–	10.6; 9/10	–	9.5
EM-Analytics/El Plural	6 May 2022	?	?	28.0; 34	29.3; 38	5.5; 3	–	20.9; 26	–		–	5.7; 2	–	0.4; 0	8.3; 6	0.4; 0	1.3
SocioMétrica/El Español	4–6 May 2022	1,000	?	25.8; 33/35	34.9; 45/47	3.9; 0/2	–	16.1; 20/22	–	5.1; 2	–	4.3; 1	–	–	6.5; 4/5	–	9.1
SocioMétrica/El Español	4–6 May 2022	1,000	?	25.8; 31/33	34.9; 44/46	3.9; 0/2	–	16.1; 19/21	–		–	4.3; 1/2	–	–	10.8; 8/10	–	9.1
Target Point/El Debate	2–5 May 2022	1,000	?	26.0; 30/32	36.1; 43/45	3.0; 0/2	–	16.6; 18/20	–		–	4.3; 3/4	–	–	9.5; 10/11	–	10.1
Hamalgama Métrica/VozPópuli	29 Apr–4 May 2022	1,000	?	27.1; 33	37.2; 48	3.0; 0	–	16.9; 20	2.0; 0		0.7; 0	3.3; 1	–	–	8.0; 7	–	10.1
EM-Analytics/El Plural	29 Apr 2022	?	?	27.9; 34	30.1; 41	5.1; 3	–	19.2; 22	–		–	5.4; 2	–	0.3; 0	8.8; 7	0.4; 0	2.2
GAD3/NIUS	26–28 Apr 2022	1,002	65.0	27.6; 34	38.2; 51	3.1; 0	–	14.0; 17	1.6; 0		–	3.5; 1	–	–	7.8; 6	–	10.6
KeyData/Público	27 Apr 2022	?	59.5	26.0; 33	33.5; 44	4.0; 2	–	17.7; 20	–		–	3.5; 2	–	–	8.3; 8	–	7.5
Agora Integral/Canarias Ahora	25–27 Apr 2022	1,000	57.6	25.9; 32/34	33.7; 44/46	4.5; 1/3	–	17.9; 19/21	–	7.8; 8/9	2.9; 0/2	3.8; 1/3	–	–	–	–	7.8
IMOP/El Confidencial	25–26 Apr 2022	953	68.0	27.7; 33/35	40.2; 50/53	2.8; 0	–	13.5; 14/15	–		–	3.1; 0/1	–	–	7.9; 6/7	–	12.5
Data10/Okdiario	25 Apr 2022	1,000	?	27.4; 34	35.5; 45	3.6; 0	–	18.3; 22	–		–	2.9; 1	–	–	9.5; 7	–	8.1
NC Report/La Razón	18–22 Apr 2022	1,000	?	25.1; 31/33	33.3; 45/47	4.9; 1/3	–	16.2; 17/18	–	8.9; 9/10	2.4; 0	5.1; 2/3	–	–	–	–	8.2
Sigma Dos/El Mundo	18–21 Apr 2022	2,200	?	25.7; 33	33.1; 44	4.7; 2	–	17.6; 20	–	9.4; 8/9	3.2; 0/1	3.1; 0/1	–	–	–	–	7.4
SocioMétrica/El Español	14–16 Apr 2022	1,000	?	25.0; 31	(Note: Within PP+Cs.)		–	16.9; 20	–	7.8; 6	3.0; 0	5.9; 3	37.1; 49	–	–	–	12.1
SocioMétrica/El Español	14–16 Apr 2022	1,000	?	24.8; 33	34.0; 46	3.9; 0	–	16.5; 20	–	7.7; 7	3.1; 0	5.8; 3	–	–	–	–	9.2
CENTRA/CEA	21–31 Mar 2022	3,600	59.8	25.3; 30/31	34.0; 43/44	4.3; 2	–	19.0; 22	2.3; 0/1	9.1; 10	–	2.8; 0/1	–	–	–	–	8.7
PP	18 Mar 2022	?	?	? 30/31	? 35/36	? 0/1	–	? 22/23	–	–	–	–	–	–	–	–	?
Deimos/VozPópuli	20–24 Feb 2022	1,500	?	27.8; 32/35	32.5; 38/41	3.6; 0/3	–	20.0; 23/24	–	8.6; 8/11	1.1; 0	3.5; 1/2	–	–	–	–	4.7
Social Data/Grupo Viva	14–18 Feb 2022	2,400	?	24.3; 28/34	38.0; 48/53	4.1; 1/4	–	16.7; 17/22	–	7.2; 4/8	2.1; 0/1	5.1; 1/5	–	–	–	–	13.7
EM-Analytics/Electomanía	1 Jan–14 Feb 2022	1,472	?	28.8; 37	29.9; 38	5.0; 3	–	18.2; 21	–	7.7; 6	1.6; 0	6.0; 3	–	1.8; 1	–	–	1.1
EM-Analytics/Electomanía	15 Nov–14 Jan 2022	1,843	?	28.9; 36	30.6; 40	5.0; 3	–	17.6; 21	–	7.6; 5	1.5; 0	6.1; 3	–	1.9; 1	–	–	1.7
Sigma Dos/El Mundo	14 Dec–10 Jan 2022	3,404	?	26.7; 32/33	36.9; 48/49	6.1; 3/4	–	13.6; 13/15	–	8.3; 7/8	1.6; 0	4.4; 2	–	–	–	–	10.2
CENTRA/CEA	24 Nov–13 Dec 2021	3,600	60.9	25.1; 31/33	35.1; 44/46	5.5; 4/5	–	10.9; 12/13	–	10.7; 11/12	2.6; 1	4.4; 2/3	–	–	–	–	10.0
SocioMétrica/El Español	3–6 Dec 2021	1,200	?	26.9; 32			–	16.0; 19	–	6.9; 5	1.3; 0	6.2; 3	39.6; 50	–	–	–	12.7
SocioMétrica/El Español	3–6 Dec 2021	1,200	?	26.2; 33	36.4; 47	4.9; 3	–	15.0; 18	–	6.8; 5	1.1; 0	6.0; 3	–	–	–	–	10.2
NC Report/La Razón	2–12 Nov 2021	1,000	?	27.2; 32/34	34.9; 44/46	5.1; 2/3	–	14.7; 15/17	–	11.2; 10/12	–	3.4; 1/2	–	–	–	–	7.7
CENTRA/CEA	18–30 Sep 2021	3,600	61.2	23.1; 24/27	38.3; 47/51	8.3; 7	–	12.8; 13/15	–	11.0; 12/14	–	2.9; 0/1	–	–	–	–	15.2
NC Report/La Razón	2–5 Aug 2021	1,000	58.6	28.1; 33/35	33.9; 40/42	4.9; 2/4	–	14.5; 15/17	–	11.7; 11/12	–	3.2; 1/2	–	–	–	–	5.8
EM-Analytics/Electomanía	18 May–29 Jun 2021	1,703	?	27.6; 36	36.1; 46	4.5; 1	–	14.7; 18	–	8.1; 6	–	5.1; 2	–	–	–	–	8.5
CENTRA/CEA	15–24 Jun 2021	3,600	60.2	23.3; 28/29	37.9; 48/52	8.7; 7/8	–	11.4; 12/13	–	9.2; 9/10	–	3.6; 0/2	–	–	–	–	14.6
Sigma Dos/El Mundo	7–9 Jun 2021	1,000	?	26.1; 31	36.7; 43	4.2; 4	–	14.8; 17	–	7.6; 8	–	5.5; 6	–	–	–	–	10.6
Social Data/Grupo Viva	20 May–3 Jun 2021	1,924	?	25.8; 30/38	38.1; 46/54	3.4; 1/5	–	15.5; 16/24	–	6.4; 5/13	–	5.1; 2/8	–	–	–	–	12.3
NC Report/La Razón	26–30 May 2021	900	59.0	30.3; 38/39	31.8; 39/41	5.1; 2/4	–	15.1; 16/17	–	12.6; 10/11	–	2.7; 0	–	–	–	–	1.5
EM-Analytics/Electomanía	14 May 2021	2,125	?	28.5; 34	35.3; 44	5.2; 3	–	14.2; 16	–	9.5; 10	–	5.5; 2	–	–	–	–	6.8
NC Report/La Razón	11–14 May 2021	900	58.6	30.7; 39	30.2; 39	6.8; 3	–	14.1; 15	–	13.7; 13	–	2.5; 0	–	–	–	–	0.5
Invest Group/CEA	18–25 Mar 2021	3,600	50.1	23.5; 26/29	31.2; 40/43	8.1; 7	–	18.1; 20/21	–	10.6; 10/12	–	3.5; 0/2	–	–	–	–	7.7
GAD3/Secuoya	5–18 Mar 2021	3,000	?	27.1; 32/33	37.6; 48/53	5.6; 2/4	–	14.1; 15/18	1.4; 0	7.7; 4/5	–	3.9; 1	–	–	–	–	10.5
EM-Analytics/Electomanía	26 Feb 2021	1,500	?	29.6; 35	29.3; 36	10.9; 11	–	13.5; 15	–	10.6; 11	–	4.7; 1	–	–	–	–	0.3
Deimos Estadística	15–24 Feb 2021	1,500	?	32.3; 38/40	28.5; 33/34	7.0; 5/7	–	15.7; 18/19	–	8.8; 8/10	–	3.3; 2/3	–	–	–	–	3.8
Dataestudios/ABC	7–13 Jan 2021	?	?	25.2; 29/31	26.3; 33/36	10.4; 10/12	–	15.9; 17/20	–	10.9; 12/14	–	4.2; 1/3	–	–	–	–	1.1
Celeste-Tel/PSOE	30 Nov–14 Dec 2020	1,000	?	31.4; 40	25.3; 32	13.2; 13	–	11.9; 12	–	11.8; 12	–	2.4; 0	–	–	–	–	6.1
Invest Group/CEA	23 Nov–3 Dec 2020	3,600	48.0	23.5; 27/30	26.6; 35/38	12.2; 13/15	–	15.7; 16/19	–	10.3; 10/12	–	4.8; 1/3	–	–	–	–	3.1
NC Report/La Razón	2 Dec 2020	900	?	28.9; 37/38	25.9; 31/32	12.7; 13/14	–	12.0; 12/13	–	11.3; 11/12	–	4.8; 2/4	–	–	–	–	3.0
Hamalgama Métrica/Okdiario	30 Nov–1 Dec 2020	800	?	28.3; 37	25.5; 31	11.5; 12	–	13.2; 14	–	12.5; 14	–	3.0; 1	–	–	–	–	2.8
Dialoga Consultores	23–27 Nov 2020	1,500	?	25.6; 29/32	28.1; 36/39	11.8; 9/13	–	12.5; 16/19	–	9.8; 7/10	–	6.1; 4/7	–	–	–	–	2.5
SW Demoscopia/Grupo Viva	16–26 Nov 2020	?	?	26.9; 31/33	28.7; 34/37	10.6; 11/14	–	14.1; 13/16	–	5.6; 3/6	–	9.8; 8/11	–	–	–	–	1.8
ElectoPanel/Electomanía	30 Sep–13 Nov 2020	7,230	?	30.4; 38	31.1; 38	11.6; 11	–	11.1; 11	–	10.8; 11	–	4.1; 0	–	–	–	–	0.7
Invest Group/CEA	15–25 Sep 2020	3,600	51.8	26.4; 29/32	30.2; 39/42	11.9; 13/14	–	13.3; 14/15	–	10.8; 10/13	–	4.2; 0/2	–	–	–	–	3.8
Celeste-Tel/PSOE	26 Jun–4 Jul 2020	1,000	?	31.1; 40	26.0; 31	11.2; 10	–	10.9; 11	–	16.6; 17	–	–	–	–	–	–	5.1
Invest Group/CEA	18 Jun–1 Jul 2020	3,600	58.0	30.4; 35/37	30.8; 36/37	11.2; 12/13	–	10.1; 11/12	–	9.4; 9/11	–	4.0; 2/3	–	–	–	–	0.4
SW Demoscopia/Grupo Viva	8–15 May 2020	1,000	?	25.1; 28/31	26.8; 28/32	13.1; 13/16	–	14.7; 15/18	–	15.8; 16/19	–	–	–	–	–	–	1.7
ElectoPanel/Electomanía	1 Apr–15 May 2020	?	?	28.0; 36	33.1; 44	10.3; 11	–	9.7; 9	–	8.4; 7	–	4.7; 2	–	–	–	–	5.1
ElectoPanel/Electomanía	23–27 Feb 2020	1,100	?	25.5; 32	24.7; 31	8.1; 8	–	19.7; 23	–	14.4; 15	–	4.0; 0	–	–	–	–	0.8
GAD3/ABC	17–21 Feb 2020	802	?	28.6; 33/36	26.5; 32/33	9.3; 8/10	15.8; 16/17	14.7; 16/17	–	–	–	–	–	–	–	–	2.1
SW Demoscopia/Grupo Viva	5–18 Feb 2020	1,310	?	25.7; 29/31	26.4; 29/32	9.6; 9/13	17.1; 17/21	15.4; 16/19	–	–	–	–	–	–	–	–	0.7
Celeste-Tel/PSOE	20–30 Jan 2020	2,600	61.1	31.6; 40	25.1; 30	12.2; 11	17.0; 17	10.7; 11	–	–	–	–	–	–	–	–	6.5
ElectoPanel/Electomanía	9 Jan 2020	?	?	24.8; 29	24.0; 29	7.3; 6	17.9; 18	21.0; 27	–	–	–	–	–	–	–	–	0.8
Nexo/CEA	25 Nov–12 Dec 2019	2,627	57.0	27.8	24.5	10.5	15.6	16.2	1.4	–	–	–	–	–	–	–	3.3
November 2019 general election	10 Nov 2019	—N/a	65.9	33.4 (42)	20.5 (24)	8.1 (7)	–	20.4 (23)	1.1 (0)	13.1 (13)	1.3 (0)	–	–	–	–	–	12.9
Celeste-Tel/PSOE	15–25 Jul 2019	2,600	60.8	33.6; 42	24.6; 30	14.0; 13	16.1; 17	8.2; 7	–	–	–	–	–	–	–	–	9.0
Asé–Psiké/CEA	10–26 Jun 2019	2,567	60.2	30.5	24.8	17.8	14.0	8.1	1.2	–	–	–	–	–	–	–	5.7
2019 EP election	26 May 2019	—N/a	58.4	40.5 (54)	22.3 (27)	13.0 (12)	–	7.6 (8)	1.4 (0)	11.6 (12)	–	–	–	–	–	–	18.2
April 2019 general election	28 Apr 2019	—N/a	70.8	34.2 (42)	17.2 (19)	17.7 (20)	–	13.4 (13)	1.4 (0)	14.3 (15)	–	–	–	–	–	–	16.5
2018 regional election	2 Dec 2018	—N/a	56.6	27.9; 33	20.7; 26	18.3; 21	16.2; 17	11.0; 12	1.9; 0	–	–	–	–	–	–	–	7.2

=== Voting preferences ===
The table below lists raw, unweighted voting preferences.

Color key:

Poll conducted after legal ban on opinion polls

Polling firm/Commissioner	Fieldwork date	Sample size	PSOE–A	PP	Cs	Adelante Andalucía (2018)	Vox	UPxA	Andaluces Levantaos	Adelante Andalucía (2021)	PorA	Question	X mark	Lead
2022 regional election (Note: Does not include non-resident citizens.)	19 Jun 2022	—N/a	13.9	24.9	1.9	–	7.8		0.2	2.6	4.4	—N/a	41.6	11.0
GAD3/Canal Sur	3–18 Jun 2022	9,214	18.0	42.0	–	–	10.0		–	4.0	4.0	–	–	24.0
Social Data/Grupo Viva	6–11 Jun 2022	2,405	16.8	33.9	2.3	–	9.4		0.5	3.4	3.8	15.8	6.2	17.1
40dB/Prisa	3–8 Jun 2022	1,200	15.0	26.6	3.1	–	10.2		–	5.3	6.8	19.4	5.1	11.6
CIS	6–7 Jun 2022	3,083	16.9	32.6	2.3	–	8.4		–	3.6	5.8	22.5	3.5	15.7
CIS	17–28 May 2022	7,539	16.0	31.5	1.7	–	7.9		–	2.9	6.8	25.1	3.8	15.5
SocioMétrica/El Español	24–26 May 2022	1,000	13.7	22.1	2.5	–	12.4		–	3.2	8.2	17.9	17.3	8.4
40dB/Prisa	18–23 May 2022	1,200	14.5	24.9	2.1	–	9.9		–	6.1	8.4	21.5	6.2	10.4
CENTRA/CEA	3–13 May 2022	4,500	19.3	33.4	3.8	–	13.8		–	2.9	5.0	14.6	3.5	14.1
SocioMétrica/El Español	14–16 Apr 2022	1,000	17.5	23.5	2.9	–	11.0	4.2	2.4	4.6	–	14.7	15.4	6.0
CENTRA/CEA	21–31 Mar 2022	3,600	18.2	30.6	2.4	–	14.6	6.6	0.1	2.1	–	4.6	12.3	12.4
CENTRA/CEA	24 Nov–13 Dec 2021	3,600	14.8	32.1	3.1	–	6.9	6.9	0.8	3.0	–	16.4	5.6	17.3
CENTRA/CEA	18–30 Sep 2021	3,600	10.8	36.4	5.2	–	8.0	5.1	–	1.8	–	16.0	7.1	25.6
CENTRA/CEA	15–24 Jun 2021	3,600	12.4	34.6	4.8	–	5.6	3.1	–	1.9	–	23.4	7.6	22.2
Invest Group/CEA	18–25 Mar 2021	3,600	15.9	25.6	4.7	–	12.8	6.5	–	2.4	–	13.4	10.5	9.7
Invest Group/CEA	23 Nov–3 Dec 2020	3,600	14.0	24.3	8.4	–	10.6	5.3	–	3.0	–	14.0	10.8	10.3
Invest Group/CEA	15–25 Sep 2020	3,600	16.5	22.0	7.9	–	10.5	7.1	–	3.3	–	12.3	11.4	5.5
Invest Group/CEA	18 Jun–1 Jul 2020	3,600	23.1	21.6	6.8	–	7.6	7.1	–	3.1	–	11.8	10.7	1.5
Nexo/CEA	25 Nov–12 Dec 2019	2,627	22.1	18.1	6.9	13.3	12.2	–	–	–	–	10.8	7.6	4.0
November 2019 general election	10 Nov 2019	—N/a	22.4	13.8	5.4	–	13.7	8.8	0.9	–	–	—N/a	31.8	8.6
Asé–Psiké/CEA	10–26 Jun 2019	2,567	22.4	26.3	12.7	9.9	7.2	–	–	–	–	10.3	5.4	3.9
2019 EP election	26 May 2019	—N/a	24.2	13.3	7.8	–	4.5	6.9	–	–	–	—N/a	39.5	10.9
April 2019 general election	28 Apr 2019	—N/a	24.8	12.4	12.8	–	9.7	10.3	–	–	–	—N/a	26.7	12.0
2018 regional election	2 Dec 2018	—N/a	16.0	11.9	10.5	9.3	6.3	–	–	–	–	—N/a	41.3	4.1

=== Victory preferences ===
The table below lists opinion polling on the victory preferences for each party in the event of a regional election taking place.

Polling firm/Commissioner	Fieldwork date	Sample size	PSOE–A	PP	Cs	Vox	Adelante Andalucía (2021)	PorA	Other/ None	Question	Lead
SocioMétrica/El Español	8–12 Jun 2022	1,912	16.9	22.8	4.8	13.7	6.4	9.4	26.1	–	5.9
CIS	6–7 Jun 2022	3,083	21.1	38.9	2.7	8.0	3.7	6.7	6.7	12.0	17.8
CIS	17–28 May 2022	7,539	20.9	38.2	2.4	7.9	3.3	7.4	6.6	13.2	17.3
CENTRA/CEA	3–13 May 2022	4,500	22.4	34.8	3.4	13.4	2.4	4.5	8.2	11.0	12.4

=== Victory likelihood ===
The table below lists opinion polling on the perceived likelihood of victory for each party in the event of a regional election taking place.

Polling firm/Commissioner	Fieldwork date	Sample size	PSOE–A	PP	Cs	Vox	UPxA	Adelante Andalucía (2021)	PorA	Other/ None	Question	Lead
SocioMétrica/El Español	8–12 Jun 2022	1,912	11.4	57.3	0.5	7.4	–	0.9	1.5	20.9	–	45.9
CIS	6–7 Jun 2022	3,083	9.5	74.2	–	2.0	–	–	0.3	0.9	13.2	64.7
CIS	17–28 May 2022	7,539	11.6	69.6	–	2.6	–	–	–	1.7	14.6	58.0
CENTRA/CEA	3–13 May 2022	4,500	8.5	68.4	0.2	1.6	–	0.3	0.3	0.6	12.0	59.9
CENTRA/CEA	18–30 Sep 2021	3,600	14.7	68.1	0.7	1.2	–	–	–	0.3	15.1	53.4
CENTRA/CEA	15–24 Jun 2021	3,600	13.5	58.9	0.7	0.5	0.1	0.3	–	0.2	25.9	45.4
Invest Group/CEA	18–25 Mar 2021	3,600	21.1	41.9	2.2	7.2	3.9	0.6	–	1.6	21.6	20.8

=== Preferred President ===
The table below lists opinion polling on leader preferences to become president of the Regional Government of Andalusia.

Polling firm/Commissioner	Fieldwork date	Sample size													Other/ None/ Not care	Question	Lead
Polling firm/Commissioner	Fieldwork date	Sample size	Díaz PSOE–A	Montero PSOE–A	Espadas PSOE–A	Moreno PP	Marín Cs	Hernández Vox	Olona Vox	Gavira Vox	Velarde UPporA	Delgado UPporA	Rodríguez AA	Nieto PorA	Other/ None/ Not care	Question	Lead
Social Data/Grupo Viva	6–11 Jun 2022	2,405	–	–	12.8	49.7	2.3	–	6.8	–	–	–	5.8	2.1	–	–	36.9
GAD3/ABC	7–9 Jun 2022	1,000	–	–	14.7	46.9	0.8	–	6.8	–	–	–	3.6	3.3	14.0	9.9	32.2
40dB/Prisa	3–8 Jun 2022	1,200	–	–	11.7	38.4	2.6	–	7.9	–	–	–	6.8	4.3	14.6	13.7	26.7
CIS	6–7 Jun 2022	3,083	–	–	16.0	42.9	2.8	–	6.8	–	–	–	6.8	4.2	6.4	14.1	26.9
DYM/Henneo	3–6 Jun 2022	2,313	–	–	12.9	38.5	1.9	–	9.3	–	–	–	8.0	5.3	–	24.1	25.6
CIS	17–28 May 2022	7,539	–	–	13.4	44.0	1.6	–	6.6	–	–	–	5.8	3.7	8.5	16.5	30.6
SocioMétrica/El Español	24–26 May 2022	1,000	–	–	18.2	41.3	3.2	–	18.5	–	–	–	14.0	4.9	–	–	22.8
40dB/Prisa	18–23 May 2022	1,200	–	–	9.9	36.5	2.6	–	7.2	–	–	–	8.8	5.0	12.1	17.8	26.6
CENTRA/CEA	3–13 May 2022	4,500	–	–	14.5	49.8	1.9	–	4.7	–	–	–	4.0	1.3	12.3	11.5	35.3
SocioMétrica/El Español	14–16 Apr 2022	1,000	–	–	15.2	36.6	4.1	–	–	9.3	–	3.9	9.1	–	21.8		21.4
CENTRA/CEA	21–31 Mar 2022	3,600	–	–	14.1	35.1	2.3	–	7.3	3.8	3.5	–	3.1	–	27.9	2.8	21.0
Social Data/Grupo Viva	14–18 Feb 2022	2,400	–	–	14.1	48.6	–	–	–	–	–	–	–	–	21.1	16.2	34.5
CENTRA/CEA	24 Nov–13 Dec 2021	3,600	–	–	11.1	40.7	2.1	–	4.2	0.8	2.1	–	5.1	–	19.6	14.3	29.6
SocioMétrica/El Español	3–6 Dec 2021	1,200	–	–	17.3	45.8	4.1	–	14.3	–	5.9	–	12.2	–	0.4	–	28.5
CENTRA/CEA	18–30 Sep 2021	3,600	–	–	7.5	54.3	2.7	–	–	2.0	0.6	–	5.8	–	15.2	11.7	46.8
CENTRA/CEA	15–24 Jun 2021	3,600	1.0	–	9.9	45.7	2.4	–	–	0.6	0.2	–	2.5	–	14.6	22.9	35.8
Invest Group/CEA	18–25 Mar 2021	3,600	5.4	3.5	3.4	34.0	3.5	4.4	3.5	–	3.3	–	3.5	–	26.0	9.6	28.6
Invest Group/CEA	23 Nov–3 Dec 2020	3,600	7.4	–	–	33.5	5.7	5.6	–	–	2.7	–	4.4	–	31.1	9.5	26.1
GAD3/ABC	17–21 Feb 2020	802	15.6	4.3	2.6	30.5	5.8	4.2	–	–	–	–	10.7	–	20.7	5.6	14.9

== Voter turnout ==
The table below shows registered voter turnout during the election. Figures for election day do not include non-resident citizens, while final figures do.

Province	Time (Election day)										Final		
Province	11:30	14:00			18:00			20:00			Final		
Province	2022	2018	2022	+/–	2018	2022	+/–	2018	2022	+/–	2018	2022	+/–
Almería	16.51%	30.41%	32.23%	+1.82	45.95%	41.77%	−4.18	57.39%	55.96%	−1.43	52.81%	51.31%	−1.50
Cádiz	13.56%	28.19%	31.16%	+2.97	42.92%	41.36%	−1.56	54.54%	53.08%	−1.46	52.11%	51.54%	−0.57
Córdoba	17.35%	31.67%	38.92%	+7.25	48.89%	48.48%	−0.41	62.16%	62.51%	+0.35	60.53%	60.79%	+0.26
Granada	16.82%	31.80%	34.93%	+3.33	48.52%	44.47%	−4.05	60.83%	59.61%	−1.22	57.02%	55.65%	−1.37
Huelva	12.22%	26.89%	29.80%	+2.91	42.62%	39.89%	−2.73	55.54%	54.93%	−0.61	54.58%	53.86%	−0.72
Jaén	16.97%	30.94%	37.88%	+6.94	47.93%	47.21%	−0.72	63.30%	63.65%	+0.35	61.87%	62.09%	+0.22
Málaga	15.62%	29.84%	32.98%	+3.14	45.64%	43.59%	−2.05	56.63%	56.21%	−0.42	54.22%	53.68%	−0.54
Seville	15.08%	29.88%	35.51%	+5.63	48.05%	46.78%	−1.27	60.59%	60.98%	+0.39	59.24%	59.52%	+0.28
Total	15.44%	29.92%	34.24%	+4.32	46.47%	44.51%	−1.96	58.65%	58.36%	−0.29	56.56%	56.13%	−0.43

== Results ==
=== Overall ===
← Summary of the 19 June 2022 Parliament of Andalusia election results →
Parties and alliances	Popular vote			Seats	
Parties and alliances	Votes	%	±pp	Total	+/−
People's Party (PP)	1,589,272	43.11	+22.36	58	+32
Spanish Socialist Workers' Party of Andalusia (PSOE–A)	888,325	24.10	−3.84	30	−3
Vox (Vox)	496,618	13.47	+2.51	14	+2
United Left–More Country–Greens Equo–Initiative: For Andalusia (PorA)^{1}	284,027	7.70	n/a	5	±0
Forward Andalusia–Andalusians (Adelante Andalucía–Andalucistas)^{1}	168,960	4.58	n/a	2	−10
Citizens–Party of the Citizenry (Cs)	121,567	3.30	−14.98	0	−21
Animalist Party Against Mistreatment of Animals (PACMA)	35,199	0.95	−0.98	0	±0
Jaén Deserves More (JM+)	18,873	0.51	New	0	±0
Arise Andalusians Coalition (AL)^{2}	11,980	0.32	−0.32	0	±0
Blank Seats (EB)	4,407	0.12	+0.04	0	±0
Communist Party of the Andalusian People (PCPA)	4,358	0.12	−0.06	0	±0
For a Fairer World (PUM+J)	3,418	0.09	New	0	±0
For Huelva (XH)	3,197	0.09	New	0	±0
Andalusian Nation (NA)	2,839	0.08	−0.06	0	±0
Communist Party of the Workers of Spain (PCTE)	2,766	0.08	New	0	±0
Zero Cuts (Recortes Cero)	2,766	0.08	−0.12	0	±0
Socialist Republican Coalition for Andalusia (CRSxA)^{3}	2,371	0.06	+0.02	0	±0
Self-employed Party (Partido Autónomos)	2,180	0.06	New	0	±0
The Greens (Los Verdes)	1,457	0.04	New	0	±0
Spanish Phalanx of the CNSO (FE de las JONS)	1,404	0.04	−0.03	0	±0
Together for Granada–The Party of the Granadexit (JxG)	1,308	0.04	New	0	±0
Volt Spain (Volt)	923	0.03	New	0	±0
Retirees Party for the Future. Dignity and Democracy (JUFUDI)	348	0.01	New	0	±0
We Are Future (Somos Futuro)	266	0.01	New	0	±0
Wake Up–Constitutionalist Sociopolitical Party (Despierta)	261	0.01	New	0	±0
Revolutionary Anticapitalist Left (IZAR)	200	0.01	−0.01	0	±0
Enough is Enough! (Federación Basta Ya!)	163	0.00	New	0	±0
Blank ballots	36,924	1.00	−0.57		
Total	3,686,377			109	±0
Valid votes	3,686,377	98.88	+1.08		
Invalid votes	41,778	1.12	−1.08		
Votes cast / turnout	3,728,155	56.13	−0.43		
Abstentions	2,913,748	43.87	+0.43		
Registered voters	6,641,903				
Sources
Footnotes: ^{1} Within the Forward–We Can–United Left–Spring–Andalusian Left alliance in the 2018 election.; ^{2} Arise Andalusians Coalition results are compared to the combined totals of Andalusia by Herself and Andalusian Convergence in the 2018 election.; ^{3} Socialist Republican Coalition for Andalusia results are compared to Republican Alternative totals in the 2018 election.

Popular vote
PP	43.11%
PSOE–A	24.10%
Vox	13.47%
PorA	7.70%
AA	4.58%
Cs	3.30%
Others	2.73%
Blank ballots	1.00%

Seats
PP	53.21%
PSOE–A	27.52%
Vox	12.84%
PorA	4.59%
AA	1.83%

=== Distribution by constituency ===
Constituency	PP		PSOE–A		Vox		PorA		AA	
Constituency	%	S	%	S	%	S	%	S	%	S
Almería	45.6	6	22.1	3	20.7	3	5.0	−	1.7	−
Cádiz	42.5	8	21.0	3	13.2	2	7.5	1	8.0	1
Córdoba	44.7	7	23.5	3	12.4	1	10.0	1	3.5	−
Granada	42.2	6	25.4	4	15.4	2	7.7	1	3.2	−
Huelva	42.7	6	27.4	4	12.8	1	6.5	−	3.9	−
Jaén	42.5	6	27.1	4	12.8	1	5.6	−	1.8	−
Málaga	47.0	10	20.7	4	13.5	2	8.1	1	3.8	−
Seville	40.1	9	26.6	5	11.4	2	8.4	1	6.3	1
Total	43.1	58	24.1	30	13.5	14	7.7	5	4.6	2

=== Analysis ===
The election resulted in a landslide victory for the People's Party (PP), with incumbent president Juanma Moreno being re-elected. The PP won in all eight provinces in Andalusia, with the constituency of Seville flipping from the Spanish Socialist Workers' Party of Andalusia (PSOE–A) to the PP for the first time since the Spanish transition to democracy. In total, the PP took 58 of the 109 seats in parliament, an increase of 32 from their 2018 result and an absolute majority of seats that was the first in its history, while taking 43% of the vote, up 22 points from the last election. The PSOE—which, for the first time in history, was contesting a regional election in Andalusia from opposition—got its worst result ever in the autonomous community with 24.1% and 30 seats, being unable to recover from the 2018 shock which saw the party being expelled from the regional government of the community for the first time in 36 years.

The far-right Vox party failed to fulfil expectations and saw only modest gains, increasing its 2018 share by 2 points and gaining two additional seats, far short of the over 20 seats they had set themselves as a target. This was the first major electoral setback for the party since the 2019 general, regional, and local elections in Spain; in particular, the November 2019 general election had seen the party secure over 869,000 votes and 20.4% of the share, which was now reduced to 494,000 votes and 13.5%. Support for the liberal Citizens (Cs) collapsed as a result of vote transfers to the PP, whereas the left-wing vote of the 2018 Adelante Andalucía alliance divided between the United Left (IU) and Podemos-led For Andalusia coalition and the new Adelante Andalucía alliance of former Podemos regional leader Teresa Rodríguez.

== Aftermath ==
=== Government formation ===
Investiture; Nomination of Juanma Moreno (PP)
Ballot →	21 July 2022
Required majority →	55 out of 109
Yes: • PP (58)	58 / 109
No: • PSOE–A (30); • PorA (5); • AA (2)	37 / 109
Abstentions: • Vox (13)	13 / 109
Absentees: • Vox (1)	1 / 109

== Bibliography ==
- Ley Orgánica 5/1985, de 19 de junio, del Régimen Electoral General (Organic Law 5/1985). Official State Gazette (in Spanish). 19 June 1985 [version as of 7 July 2021]. BOE-A-1985-11672.
- Ley 1/1986, de 2 de enero, Electoral de Andalucía (Law 1/1986). Official State Gazette (in Spanish). 2 January 1986 [version as of 24 December 2019]. BOE-A-1986-2788.
- Ley 6/2006, de 24 de octubre, del Gobierno de la Comunidad Autónoma de Andalucía (Law 6/2006). Official State Gazette (in Spanish). 24 October 2006 [version as of 17 December 2021]. BOE-A-2006-20848.
- Ley Orgánica 2/2007, de 19 de marzo, de reforma del Estatuto de Autonomía para Andalucía (Organic Law 2/2007). Official State Gazette (in Spanish). 19 March 2007 [version as of 11 April 2011]. BOE-A-2007-5825.
- Decreto del Presidente 4/2022, de 25 de abril, de disolución del Parlamento de Andalucía y de convocatoria de elecciones (PDF) (Decree 4/2022). Official Gazette of the Regional Government of Andalusia (in Spanish). 25 April 2022. 00260130.
