= Jaén Merece Más =

Political party in Spain

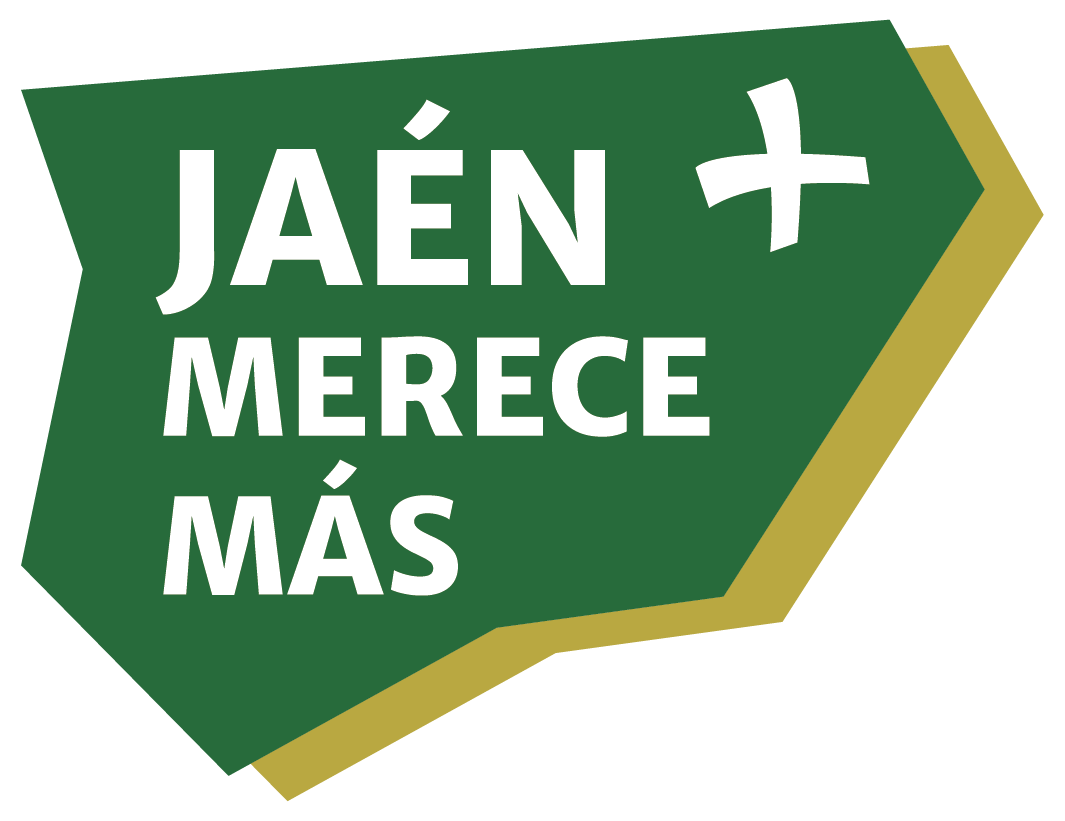

Jaén Merece Más (JM+; lit. 'Jaén Deserves More') is a Spanish political party. It was founded as a citizens' platform in 2017, to counter what it saw as neglect of the Province of Jaén. It was a founder of Empty Spain as a federation in November 2022, but left four months later due to disagreements with a vote on AVE high-speed rail in the Senate of Spain. In the 2023 Spanish local elections, it won three seats in the city council of Jaén, and became the kingmaker for larger parties to achieve a majority.

== History ==
Jaén Merece Más began as a social movement in 2017, and was registered on 29 June that year as a platform comprising 100 organisations, excluding political parties and trade unions. In 2021, it organised protests against what it saw as neglect of the Province of Jaén by the Spanish government. In March 2021, the platform organised a protest when a planned military base was instead given to neighbouring Córdoba; it called for a convoy to block the Despeñaperros pass that joins Andalusia to central Spain.

JM+ and fellow platform Levanta Jaén ran a joint list for the 2022 Andalusian regional election. The list received 6% of the vote in the Jaén constituency, falling short of winning a seat.

Jaén Merece Más was a founding organisation of Empty Spain as a federation in November 2022. In the run-up to the 2023 Spanish local elections, the party separated from the federation because the member from Teruel Existe abstained on a Senate vote to introduce AVE high-speed rail to Jaén.

In the elections, the party was the fifth-most voted in the province, with 2.71% of the vote, and joint seventh for seats, with 12. The party won three seats on the city council in the capital Jaén, becoming the kingmaker as the People's Party (PP) and Spanish Socialist Workers' Party (PSOE) had 11 seats each. The party at first called for a grand coalition with the two others, before giving its support to the PP and install Agustín González Romo as mayor. The same agreements were made in Baeza and Santisteban del Puerto, while in Santiago-Pontones the PP's support allowed for a JM+ mayor.

On 2 January 2025, the three JM+ councillors in Jaén supported a motion of no confidence that removed González as mayor and installed the PSOE's Julio Millán. In the 2026 Andalusian regional election, it fell to 2.34% of the vote in the Jaén constituency, again not winning any seats.
