= List of Spanish autonomous communities by median income =

This is a list of Spanish autonomous communities by median income. Data is from the National Statistics Institute and does not include the cities of Ceuta and Melilla.

Total yearly median income in Spain was of €24,497 in 2024.

== Autonomous communities ranked by median income ==
#	Autonomous community	2024
1	Basque Country	€31,912
2	Navarre	€29,385
3	Madrid	€28,037
4	Catalonia	€27,132
5	Balearic Islands	€24,962
6	Aragon	€24,936
7	La Rioja	€24,501
8	Asturias	€24,196
9	Cantabria	€23,246
10	Valencia	€22,652
11	Galicia	€22,603
12	Castile and León	€22,566
13	Castilla–La Mancha	€22,045
14	Murcia	€21,672
15	Andalusia	€21,557
16	Extremadura	€20,904
17	Canary Islands	€20,631
