= Adelante Andalucía (2021) =

Forward Andalusia Adelante Andalucía
- Leader: José Ignacio García
- Founder: Teresa Rodríguez
- Founded: 26 June 2021
- Split from: Podemos Andalusia
- Preceded by: Adelante Andalucía (2018)
- Headquarters: C/ San Juan de Ribera, s/n 41009, Seville
- Ideology: Andalusian nationalism Regionalism; Direct democracy Feminism; Anti-capitalism; Eco-socialism; Left-wing nationalism
- Political position: Left-wing to far-left
- National affiliation: Confederal Left (Note: In the Spanish Senate.)
- Colors
- Members: See list of members
- Congress of Deputies (Andalusian seats): 0 / 61
- Spanish Senate (Andalusian seats): 0 / 41
- European Parliament (Spanish seats): 0 / 61
- Parliament of Andalusia: 8 / 109
- Local government: 8 / 9,067

Website
- adelanteandalucia.org

Adelante Andalucía (English: "Forward Andalusia", AA) is an Andalusian nationalist and regionalist political party founded by former Podemos Andalusia leader Teresa Rodríguez. The party was established as a refoundation from the late Adelante Andalucía electoral alliance formed by Podemos and United Left/The Greens–Assembly for Andalusia.

After announcing their intention to leave Podemos in February 2020, Rodríguez and the rest of the ex-Podemos parliamentarians affiliated with Anti-capitalists (Anticapitalistas) were subject to an expulsion from their parliamentary group in October 2020. The party was eventually refounded as a left-wing nationalist organisation in June 2021, with the participation of Anticapitalistas, Andalusian Spring (Primavera Andaluza), the Party of the Andalusian Left (IzAnd) and Defend Andalusia (Defender Andalucía).

== Composition ==
Party
Anti-capitalists (Anticapitalistas)
Andalusian Spring (Primavera Andaluza)
Party of the Andalusian Left (IzAnd)
Defend Andalusia (Defender Andalucía)

== Ideology ==
=== Andalusian nationalism & regionalism ===
Adelante Andalucía's core identity is rooted in Andalusian nationalism and regionalism, advocating for the self-determination, distinct cultural identity, and political autonomy of Andalusia. It views Andalusian nationalism as a tool for social emancipation and regional economic equity. While Andalusia is the most populated autonomous region in Spain, it is 13th in median income.

=== Anti-capitalism ===
The party maintains a staunch anti-capitalist stance, criticizing standard neoliberal economic policies. It focuses on addressing regional unemployment, precarious labor conditions, and the historical economic marginalization of Andalusia relative to wealthier northern Spanish regions. As of 2024, Andalusia had the 3rd highest unemployment rate in Spain. Its platform champions workers' rights, public ownership of key infrastructure, and strong public services.

=== Eco-socialism ===
Adelante Andalucía integrates environmentalism with the socialist economic theory. The party highlights the vulnerability of the Andalusian geography to climate change, drought, and desertification. Its platform advocates for a green transition that does not penalize the working class, pushing for sustainable agriculture, renewable energy under public control, and pivoting away from an economy overly reliant on seasonal tourism, where it ranked 3rd in total tourist hotel nights.

=== Feminism ===
Feminism is also structurally embedded into the party's principles. Adelante Andalucía promotes intersectional feminist policies aimed at closing the gender wage gap, fighting gender-based violence, and ensuring equitable representation both within public institutions and its own internal party governance.

== Electoral performance ==
=== Cortes Generales ===
Election	Leading candidate	Congress				Senate		Government
Election	Leading candidate	Votes	%	Seats	+/–	Seats	+/–	Government
2023	Pilar González Modino	9,191	0.04 (23th)	0 / 350	0	0 / 208	0	Extra-parliamentary

=== Parliament of Andalusia ===
Parliament of Andalusia
Election	Leading candidate	Votes	%	Seats	Gov.
2022	Teresa Rodríguez	167,970	4.6 (#5)	2 / 109	No
2026	José Ignacio García	403,560	9.6 (#4)	8 / 109	No
