= Teresa Rodríguez =

Spanish politician (born 1981)

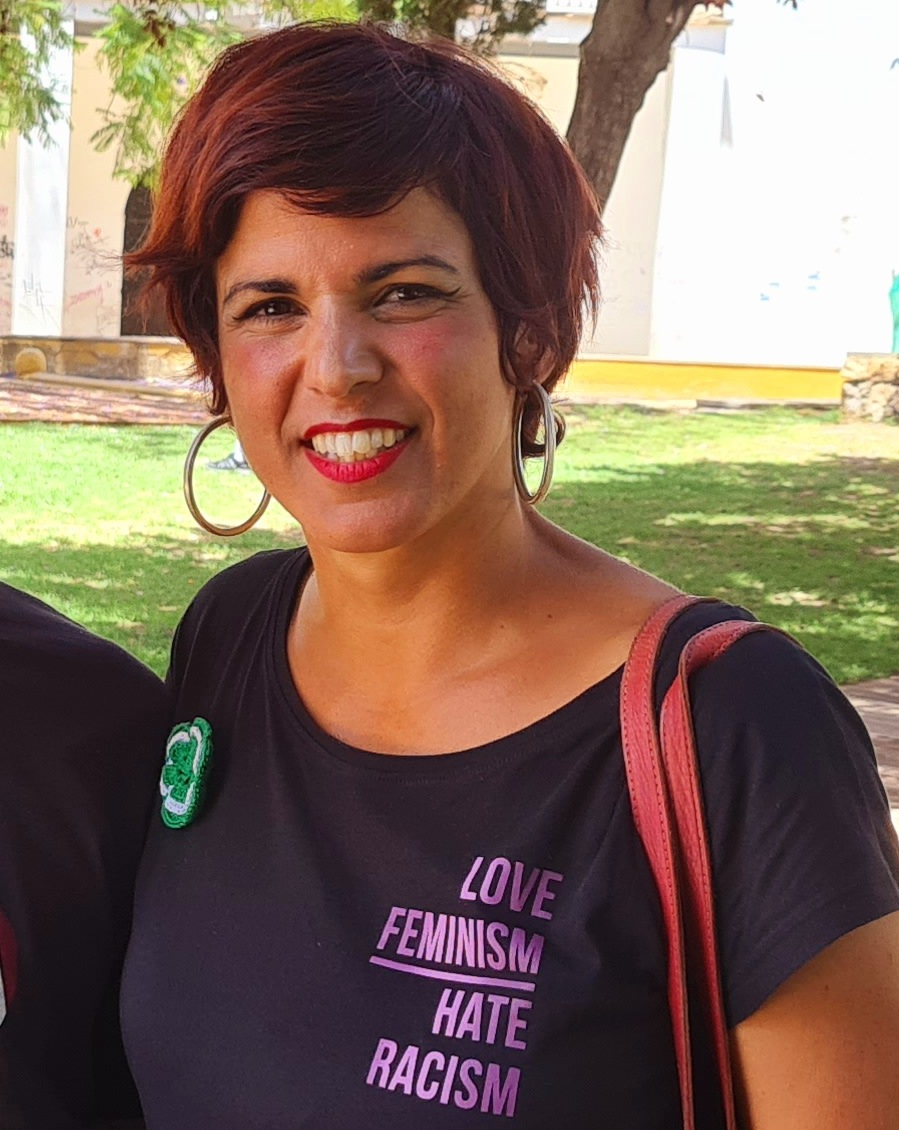
- Rodríguez in 2022

Member of the Parliament of Andalusia
- In office 16 April 2015 – 27 December 2022
- Constituency: Málaga (2015–2022); Cádiz (2022)

Member of the European Parliament for Spain
- In office 1 July 2014 – 4 March 2015
- Succeeded by: Miguel Urbán

Personal details
- Born: María Teresa Rodríguez-Rubio Vázquez; 18 September 1981 (age 45) Rota, Cádiz, Spain
- Party: Anticapitalistas (1999–present); Adelante Andalucía (since 2021)
- Other political affiliations: United Left (1999–2008); Podemos (2014–2020)
- Education: University of Seville

María Teresa Rodríguez-Rubio Vázquez (Spanish pronunciation: [teˈɾesa roˈðɾiɣeθ]; born 18 September 1981) is a Spanish politician. Active in United Left in her youth within the platform Espacio Alternativo, in 2008 the organization split from IU. She then participated in the creation of Izquierda Anticapitalista, later renamed as Anticapitalistas. She was a Member of the European Parliament representing Podemos from 2014 to 2015, and was the party's presidential candidate for the 2015 and 2018 Andalusian parliamentary elections. She left Podemos in 2020 and founded the Adelante Andalucía party, being elected to the Parliament of Andalusia in 2022 and leaving her seat at the end of the year.

== Biography ==
=== Early life and United Left ===
Rodríguez was born in Rota, Andalusia to parents who ran a perfumery. She studied Arab Philology at the University of Seville, where she took part in her first political activism against the American Naval Station Rota in her hometown, and against the People's Party (PP) reform of universities.

Rodríguez was active in the United Left (IU) from an early age, featuring on the United Left/The Greens (IULV) list for the 2000 Andalusian regional election when she was 18. As part of a current named "Espacio Alternativo", she formed part of the IU's federal executive from 2003 to 2008.

=== Podemos ===
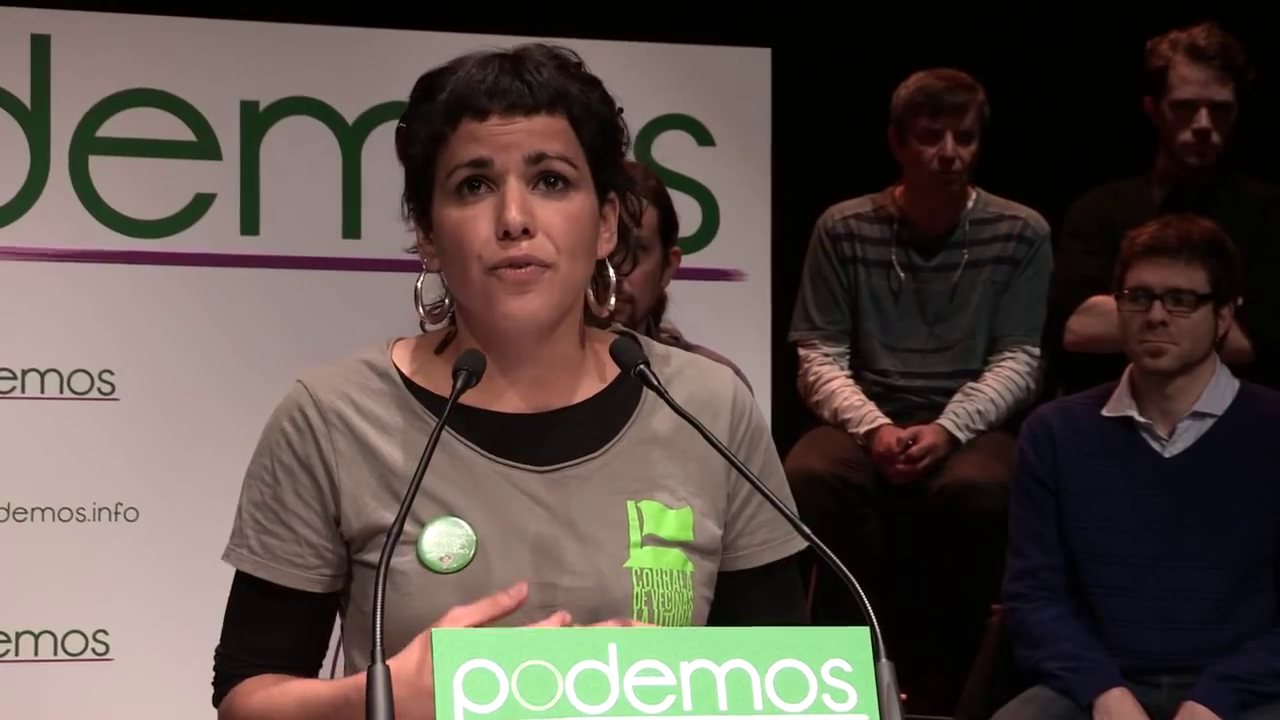
Rodríguez speaking at the launch of Podemos in January 2014

Having left IU, Rodríguez launched Anticapitalistas in 2008, first under the name Izquierda Anticapitalista, running unsuccessfully in the 2009 European Parliament election in Spain and the 2011 Spanish general election. In the 2011 Spanish local elections she ran for mayor of Cádiz, taking 1.56% of the vote (915 votes).

Rodríguez joined Podemos, founded in early 2014. In the 2014 European Parliament election in Spain, she was second on their list, which had five members elected. It took over 1.2 million votes and was the fourth most voted party in Spain. She voted against a European Union condemnation of the situation in Ukraine in 2015 because "it continues to consider Russia solely responsible for the conflict, maintaining for the European Union a defiant position by insisting on sanctions against Russia, which so far have only caused a crisis in the agricultural sector with significant consequences for farmers".

In February 2015, Rodríguez received 80.6% of the votes to lead Podemos in the 2015 Andalusian regional election. The party entered the Parliament of Andalusia for the first time with 15 seats, and she subsequently received 84.92% of the votes to be Podemos's secretary general in the region.

Rodríguez led the Adelante Andalucía coalition in the 2018 Andalusian regional election, coming fourth with 17 seats, three fewer than its composite parties won in 2015.

=== Exit from Podemos ===
In February 2020 Rodríguez and her Anticapitalistas platform left Podemos via a video with party leader Pablo Iglesias. Her branch of Podemos was the only one that had opposed the entrance of the party into the Second government of Pedro Sánchez alongside the Spanish Socialist Workers' Party (PSOE). The following year, she created a party also named Adelante Andalucía, prompting a legal challenge from Unidas Podemos which retained the name in the region. Her party took only two seats, including her own, in the 2022 Andalusian regional election. Inmaculada Nieto, leader of Unidas Podemos's new Por Andalucía coalition, blamed Rodríguez for dividing the left; the first Adelante Andalucía had taken 17 seats in 2018 while its two successors totalled seven in 2022.

In March 2022 she was amongst 151 international feminists signing Feminist Resistance Against War: A Manifesto, in solidarity with the Russian Feminist Anti-War Resistance. (Note: This manifesto was criticized by both Ukrainian feminists and members of the Feminist Anti-War Resistance themselves.)

At the end of the year, she quit her seat in the Parliament of Andalusia, citing a belief in term limits, while remaining the spokesperson of her party. Mentioning the need for politicians to work in other fields, she returned to her job as a secondary school teacher.

== Personal life ==
Rodríguez is the domestic partner of José María González Santos, the mayor of Cádiz known by the nickname "Kichi". The couple have two children.
