= Adelante Andalucía (2018) =

Forward Andalusia Adelante Andalucía
- Leader: Teresa Rodríguez
- Founded: 29 June 2018 (alliance)
- Registered: 20 December 2019 (party)
- Dissolved: 28 October 2020 (Note: Break up of the Adelante Andalucía parliamentary group.)
- Succeeded by: Adelante Andalucía (2021); Por Andalucía
- Headquarters: C/ San Juan de Ribera, s/n 41009, Seville
- Ideology: Andalusian regionalism Direct democracy Feminism; Anticapitalism; Democratic socialism
- Political position: Left-wing
- National affiliation: Unidas Podemos; Confederal Left (Note: In the Spanish Senate.)
- Members: See list of members

Adelante Andalucía (English: "Forward Andalusia") was an electoral alliance formed by Podemos Andalusia, United Left/The Greens–Assembly for Andalusia, Andalusian Left and Andalusian Spring to contest the 2018 Andalusian regional election. The latter two parties were created in the wake of the dissolution of the Andalusian Party.

After announcing their intention to leave Podemos in February 2020, Teresa Rodríguez and the rest of the ex-Podemos parliamentarians affiliated with Anticapitalistas were subject to an expulsion from their parliamentary group in October 2020. The party was eventually refounded as a left-wing nationalist organisation in June 2021.

== History ==
In 2017, Podemos Andalusia and United Left/The Greens–Assembly for Andalusia (IULV-CA) began to work on a joint roadmap in the Andalusian Parliament. The plan involved acting as a strong opposition to the PSOE of Andalusia and the President of the Andalusian Regional Government, Susana Díaz. The coalition began to take shape in March and April 2018, with talks on running together in the following elections. The talks were joined by the ecologist party Equo as well as various Andalusian nationalist parties, such as Andalusian Spring and Andalusian Left. The coalition was officially presented in June 2018, holding its first event in the city of Córdoba.

Throughout the month of September 2018, the coalition published the makeup of its electoral lists. Teresa Rodríguez was elected to represent the province of Málaga, occupying first place on the list. Meanwhile, Antonio Maíllo, the general coordinator of IULV-CA, would be in first place on the list of candidates for Seville.

After announcing their intention to leave Podemos in February 2020, Teresa Rodríguez and the rest of the ex-Podemos parliamentarians were expelled from their parliamentary group in October 2020.

== Composition ==
Party	Notes
We Can (Podemos)	
United Left/The Greens–Assembly for Andalusia (IULV–CA)	
Unitarian Candidacy of Workers (CUT)	
Andalusian Left (IzA)	
Andalusian Spring (Primavera Andaluza)	
Anti-capitalists (Anticapitalistas)	Joined in May 2020.

== Electoral performance ==
=== Parliament of Andalusia ===
Parliament of Andalusia
Election	Leading candidate	Votes	%	Seats	+/–	Government
2018	Teresa Rodríguez	585,949	16.19 (#4)	17 / 109	3 (Note: Compared to the combined totals of We Can and United Left/The Greens–Assembly for Andalusia in the 2015 regional election.)	Opposition
