= Third government of Juanma Moreno =

3rd government of Juanma Moreno
- Government of Andalusia
- 2026–present
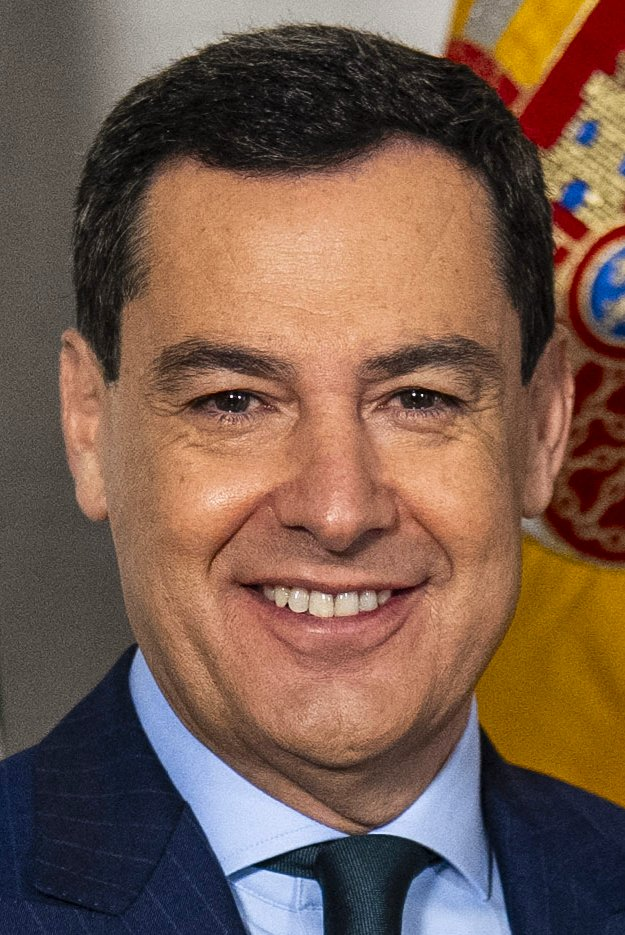
- Juanma Moreno in December 2025.
- Date formed: 9 July 2026

People and organisations
- Monarch: Felipe VI
- President: Juanma Moreno
- Vice Presidents: Antonio Sanz^{1st}, Manuel Gavira^{2nd}, Carolina España^{3rd}
- No. of ministers: 13 (Note: Does not include the President.)
- Member party: PP; Vox
- Status in legislature: Majority (coalition)
- Opposition party: PSOE–A
- Opposition leader: María Jesús Montero

History
- Election: 2026 regional election
- Legislature term: 13th Parliament
- Predecessor: Moreno II

The second government of Juanma Moreno was formed on 9 July 2026, following the latter's election as President of the Regional Government of Andalusia by the Parliament of Andalusia on 2 July and his swearing-in on 5 July, as a result of the People's Party (PP) and Vox being able to muster a majority of seats in the Parliament following the 2026 Andalusian regional election. It succeeded the first Moreno government and has been the incumbent Regional Government of Andalusia since 9 July 2026, a total of 4 days.

The cabinet comprises members of the PP and Vox, as well as a number of independents proposed by the first party.

== Investiture ==
Investiture; Nomination of Juanma Moreno (PP)
Ballot →	30 June 2026	2 July 2026
Required majority →	55 out of 109	Simple
Yes: • PP (53); • Vox (15) (on 2 Jul)	53 / 109	68 / 109
No: • PSOE–A (28); • Vox (15) (on 30 Jun); • AA (8); • PorA (5)	56 / 109	41 / 109
Abstentions	0 / 109	0 / 109
Absentees	0 / 109	0 / 109

== Council of Government ==
The Council of Government is structured into the offices for the president, 13 ministries and the post of the spokesperson of the Government.

← Moreno III Government → (9 July 2026 – present)
Portfolio	Name	Party	Took office	Left office	Ref.
President	Juanma Moreno	PP	4 July 2026	Incumbent	
First Vice President; Minister of the Presidency, Health and Emergencies	Antonio Sanz	PP	9 July 2026	Incumbent	
Second Vice President; Minister of Tourism, Justice, Deregulation and Local Administration	Manuel Gavira	Vox	9 July 2026	Incumbent	
Third Vice President; Minister of Economy, Finance and European Funds; Spokesperson of the Government	Carolina España	PP	9 July 2026	Incumbent	
Minister of Agriculture, Fisheries, Water and Rural Development	Ramón Fernández-Pacheco	PP	9 July 2026	Incumbent	
Minister of Education	Carmen Castillo	Independent	9 July 2026	Incumbent	
Minister of Employment, Business and Self-Employed Work	Rocío Blanco	Independent	9 July 2026	Incumbent	
Minister of Social Services, Families and Equality	Loles López	PP	9 July 2026	Incumbent	
Minister of Housing, Youth and Land Planning	Rocío Díaz	PP	9 July 2026	Incumbent	
Minister of University, Industry, Energy and Innovation	Jorge Paradela	Independent	9 July 2026	Incumbent	
Minister of Culture, Historical Heritage and Sports	Patricia del Pozo	PP	9 July 2026	Incumbent	
Minister of Sustainability and Environment	Adolfina Martínez	PP	9 July 2026	Incumbent	
Minister of Development and Mobility	Mario Muñoz-Atanet	PP	9 July 2026	Incumbent	
Minister of Artificial Intelligence, Digital Development and Public Administration	José Antonio Nieto	PP	9 July 2026	Incumbent	

== Notes ==
Preceded by Moreno II	Regional Government of Andalusia; 2026–present	Incumbent
