= Second government of Juanma Moreno =

2nd government of Juanma Moreno
- Government of Andalusia
- 2022–2026
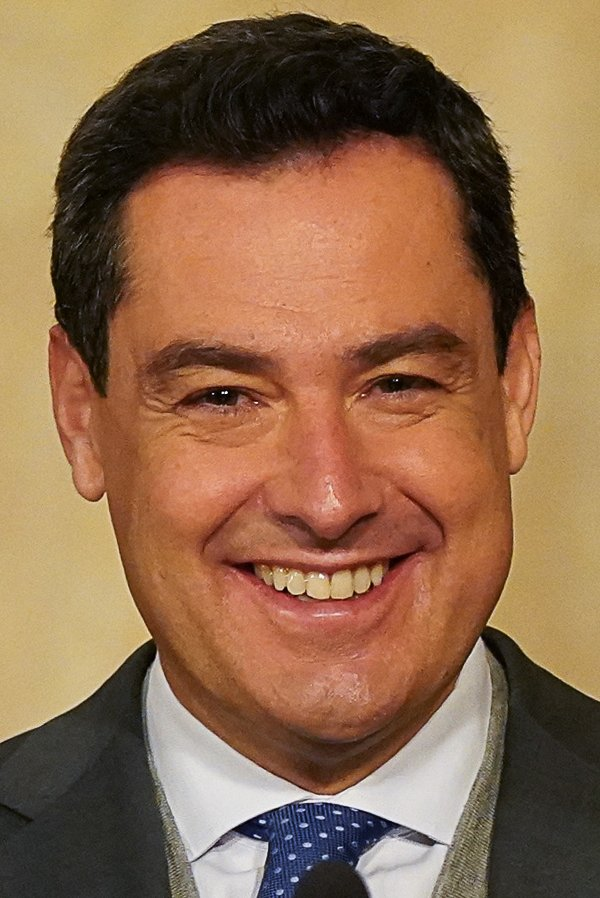
- Juanma Moreno in January 2022.
- Date formed: 26 July 2022
- Date dissolved: 9 July 2026

People and organisations
- Monarch: Felipe VI
- President: Juanma Moreno
- No. of ministers: 13 (Note: Does not include the President.) (2022–2024; 2025–2026); 14 (2024–2025)
- Total no. of members: 16
- Member party: PP
- Status in legislature: Majority (single-party)
- Opposition party: PSOE–A
- Opposition leader: Juan Espadas (2022–2025); María Jesús Montero (2025–2026)

History
- Election: 2022 regional election
- Outgoing election: 2026 regional election
- Legislature term: 12th Parliament
- Budget: 2023, 2024, 2025, 2026
- Predecessor: Moreno I
- Successor: Moreno III

The second government of Juanma Moreno was formed on 26 July 2022, following the latter's election as President of the Regional Government of Andalusia by the Parliament of Andalusia on 21 July and his swearing-in on 23 July, as a result of the People's Party (PP) emerging as the largest parliamentary force at the 2022 Andalusian regional election with an absolute majority of seats. It succeeded the first Moreno government and was the Regional Government of Andalusia from 26 July 2022 to 9 July 2026, a total of 1,444 days, or 3 years, 11 months and 13 days.

The cabinet comprised members of the PP and a number of independents. It was automatically dismissed on 18 May 2026 as a consequence of the 2026 regional election, but remained in acting capacity until the next government was sworn in.

== Investiture ==
Investiture; Juanma Moreno (PP)
Ballot →	21 July 2022
Required majority →	55 out of 109
Yes: • PP (58)	58 / 109
No: • PSOE–A (30); • PorA (5); • AA (2)	37 / 109
Abstentions: • Vox (13)	13 / 109
Absentees: • Vox (1)	1 / 109

== Cabinet changes ==
Moreno's second government saw a number of cabinet changes during its tenure:

- On 8 August 2022, the ministries of Agriculture, Water and Rural Development and Social Integration, Youth, Families and Equality were reorganized as the Agriculture, Fisheries, Water and Rural Development and Social Inclusion, Youth, Families and Equality departments, respectively.
- On 27 September 2022, it was announced that the Sustainability, Environment and Blue Economy minister Ramón Fernández-Pacheco was to be appointed as the new spokesperson of the Government, effective from 30 September, replacing Presidency minister Antonio Sanz who had been temporarily entrusted with the office's functions.
- On 3 January 2023, it was announced that Marifrán Carazo would step down as Minister of Development, Territory Articulation and Housing in order to run as the People's Party (PP)'s leading candidate for the mayorship of Granada in the 2023 Spanish local elections. She was replaced in her post by Rocío Díaz on 3 April 2023.
- On 2 May 2024, it was announced that Carmen Crespo would join the PP's list for the 9 June European Parliament election, resulting in her vacating the Agriculture, Fisheries, Water and Rural Development portfolio the following day, which was handed over to sustainability minister Ramón Fernández-Pacheco in an interim basis.
- On 30 July 2024, the cabinet saw an extensive reshuffle. Patricia del Pozo was appointed to the newly-created Culture and Sports department, leaving her older position as Educational Development and Vocational Training minister to be occupied by Carmen Castillo. Ramón Fernández-Pacheco was confirmed in the post of minister of Agriculture, Fisheries, Water and Rural Development, leaving his older position in the Sustainability, Environment and Blue Economy departament—reorganized into the Sustainability and Environment ministry—to be occupied by Catalina García, who was in turn replaced at the helm of the Health and Consumer Affairs ministry by Rocío Hernández Soto. Finally, the Tourism, Culture and Sports portfolio was reorganized into the Tourism and Andalusia Abroad department, whereas economy minister Carolina España was appointed as new Government's spokesperson.
- In October 2025, the Andalusian government became embroiled in a healthcare scandal stemming from a mishandling of breast cancer screening protocols by the Andalusian Health Service (SAS), with at least 2,000 women having suffered unjustified delays in breast cancer diagnoses (traced to a faulty outsourcing of the notification system to an external company) that could significantly reduce their survival rate. The crisis saw the resignation of regional Health minister Rocío Hernández Soto on 8 October, with Presidency minister Antonio Sanz assuming the portfolio's competences in an interim basis; on 15 October, the Presidency and Health departments were formally merged under Sanz's watch, with a redistribution of competences that saw Carolina España's department being rebranded as the Economy, Finance, European Funds and Social Dialogue ministry.

== Council of Government ==
The Council of Government was structured into the offices for the president, 13 ministries and the post of the spokesperson of the Government. In July 2024, the number of ministries was increased to 14 with the establishment of the Culture and Sports department.

← Moreno II Government → (26 July 2022 – 9 July 2026)
Portfolio	Name	Party	Took office	Left office	Ref.
President	Juanma Moreno	PP	22 July 2022	4 July 2026	
Minister of the Presidency, Interior, Social Dialogue and Administrative Simplification	Antonio Sanz	PP	26 July 2022	15 October 2025	
Minister of Economy, Finance and European Funds	Carolina España	PP	26 July 2022	30 July 2024	
Minister of Educational Development and Vocational Training	Patricia del Pozo	PP	26 July 2022	30 July 2024	
Minister of Employment, Business and Self-Employed Work	Rocío Blanco	Independent	26 July 2022	9 July 2026	
Minister of Health and Consumer Affairs	Catalina García	PP	26 July 2022	30 July 2024	
Minister of Agriculture, Water and Rural Development	Carmen Crespo	PP	26 July 2022	8 August 2022	
Minister of University, Research and Innovation	Juan Carlos Gómez Villamandos	Independent	26 July 2022	9 July 2026	
Minister of Tourism, Culture and Sports	Arturo Bernal	Independent	26 July 2022	30 July 2024	
Minister of Development, Territory Articulation and Housing	Marifrán Carazo	PP	26 July 2022	3 April 2023	
Minister of Social Integration, Youth, Families and Equality	Loles López	PP	26 July 2022	8 August 2022	
Minister of Sustainability, Environment and Blue Economy	Ramón Fernández-Pacheco	PP	26 July 2022	30 September 2022	
Minister of Industrial Policy and Energy	Jorge Paradela	Independent	26 July 2022	11 April 2023	
Minister of Justice, Local Administration and Civil Service	José Antonio Nieto	PP	26 July 2022	9 July 2026	
Spokesperson of the Government	Antonio Sanz was temporarily entrusted with the office's functions from 26 July to 30 September 2022.				
=== Changes August 2022 ===
Portfolio	Name	Party	Took office	Left office	Ref.
Minister of Agriculture, Fisheries, Water and Rural Development (Note: On 8 August 2022, the ministries of Agriculture, Water and Rural Development and Social Integration, Youth, Families and Equality were reorganized as the Agriculture, Fisheries, Water and Rural Development and Social Inclusion, Youth, Families and Equality departments, respectively.)	Carmen Crespo	PP	8 August 2022	3 May 2024	
Minister of Social Inclusion, Youth, Families and Equality	Loles López	PP	8 August 2022	9 July 2026	
=== Changes September 2022 ===
Portfolio	Name	Party	Took office	Left office	Ref.
Minister of Sustainability, Environment and Blue Economy; Spokesperson of the Government	Ramón Fernández-Pacheco	PP	30 September 2022	30 July 2024	
=== Changes April 2023 ===
Portfolio	Name	Party	Took office	Left office	Ref.
Minister of Development, Territory Articulation and Housing	Rocío Díaz	PP	3 April 2023	9 July 2026	
Minister of Industry, Energy and Mines (Note: On 11 April 2023, the Ministry of Industrial Policy and Energy was reorganized as the Industry, Energy and Mines department.)	Jorge Paradela	Independent	11 April 2023	9 July 2026	
=== Changes May 2024 ===
Portfolio	Name	Party	Took office	Left office	Ref.
Minister of Agriculture, Fisheries, Water and Rural Development	Ramón Fernández-Pacheco took on the ordinary discharge of duties from 3 May to 30 July 2024.				
=== Changes July 2024 ===
Portfolio	Name	Party	Took office	Left office	Ref.
Minister of Economy, Finance and European Funds; Spokesperson of the Government	Carolina España	PP	30 July 2024	15 October 2025	
Minister of Educational Development and Vocational Training	Carmen Castillo	Independent	30 July 2024	9 July 2026	
Minister of Agriculture, Fisheries, Water and Rural Development	Ramón Fernández-Pacheco	PP	30 July 2024	9 July 2026	
Minister of Health and Consumer Affairs	Rocío Hernández Soto	Independent	30 July 2024	8 October 2025	
Minister of Tourism and Andalusia Abroad (Note: On 30 July 2024, the ministries of Tourism, Culture and Sports and Sustainability, Environment and Blue Economy were reorganized as the Tourism and Andalusia Abroad and Sustainability and Environment departments, respectively. Concurrently, the ministry of Culture and Sports was established.)	Arturo Bernal	Independent	30 July 2024	9 July 2026	
Minister of Culture and Sports	Patricia del Pozo	PP	30 July 2024	9 July 2026	
Minister of Sustainability and Environment	Catalina García	PP	30 July 2024	9 July 2026	
=== Changes 8 October 2025 ===
Portfolio	Name	Party	Took office	Left office	Ref.
Minister of Health and Consumer Affairs	Antonio Sanz took on the ordinary discharge of duties from 8 to 15 October 2025.				
=== Changes 15 October 2025 ===
Portfolio	Name	Party	Took office	Left office	Ref.
Minister of Health, Presidency and Emergencies (Note: On 15 October 2025, the ministry of Health and Consumer Affairs was disestablished and its competences transferred to the Presidency, Interior, Social Dialogue and Administrative Simplification department, which was reorganized as the Health, Presidency and Emergencies ministry. Concurrently, the ministry of Economy, Finance and European Funds was reorganized into the Economy, Finance, European Funds and Social Dialogue department.)	Antonio Sanz	PP	15 October 2025	9 July 2026	
Minister of Economy, Finance, European Funds and Social Dialogue; Spokesperson of the Government	Carolina España	PP	15 October 2025	9 July 2026	
~~Minister of Health and Consumer Affairs~~	Disestablished on 15 October 2025.				

== Notes ==
Preceded by Moreno I	Regional Government of Andalusia; 2022–2026	Succeeded by Moreno III
