= Government of Juan Manuel Moreno =

Government of Juan Manuel Moreno may refer to:

- First government of Juanma Moreno (2019–2022)
- Second government of Juanma Moreno (2022–2026)
- Third government of Juanma Moreno (2026–present)
