= First government of José Antonio Griñán =

Government of Andalusia from 2009 to 2012

1st government of José Antonio Griñán
- 10th Government of Andalusia
- 2009–2012
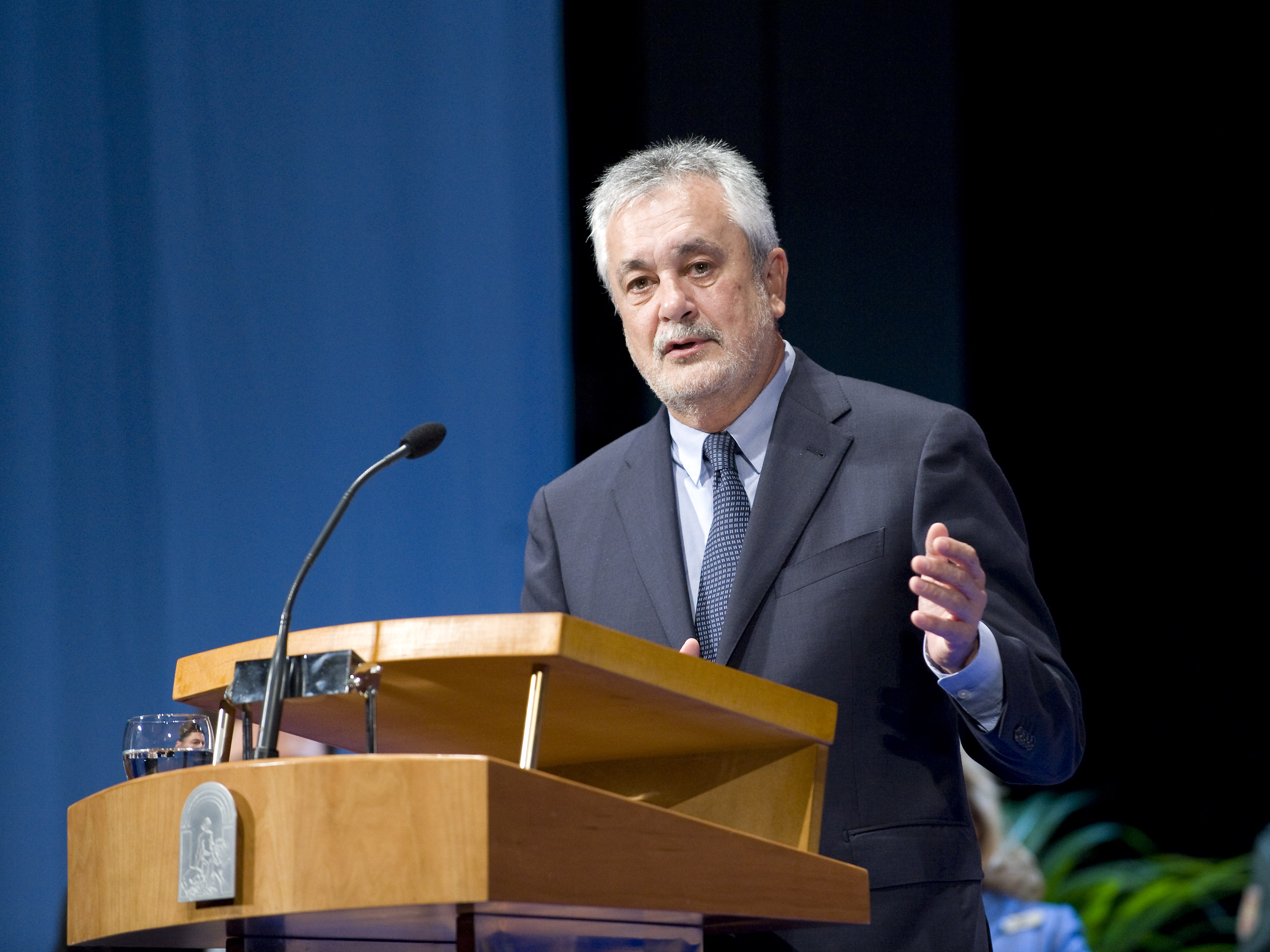
- President Griñán in February 2012.
- Date formed: 24 April 2009
- Date dissolved: 7 May 2012

People and organisations
- Monarch: Juan Carlos I
- President: José Antonio Griñán
- No. of ministers: 15 (Note: Does not include the President.) (2009–2010); 13 (2010–2012)
- Total no. of members: 21
- Member parties: PSOE–A
- Status in legislature: Majority government
- Opposition party: PP
- Opposition leader: Javier Arenas

History
- Election: 2008 regional election
- Outgoing election: 2012 regional election
- Legislature term: 8th Parliament
- Predecessor: Chaves VI
- Successor: Griñán II

The first government of José Antonio Griñán was formed on 24 April 2009 following the latter's election as President of Andalusia by the Parliament of Andalusia on 22 April and his swearing-in on 23 April, as a result of the resignation of the former president, Manuel Chaves, upon his nomination as Third Deputy Prime Minister in the second government of José Luis Rodríguez Zapatero. It succeeded the sixth Chaves government and was the Government of Andalusia from 24 April 2009 to 7 May 2012, a total of 1,109 days, or 3 years and 13 days.

The cabinet comprised members of the PSOE–A and one independent. It was automatically dismissed on 26 March 2012 as a consequence of the 2012 regional election, but remained in acting capacity until the next government was sworn in.

== Investiture ==
Investiture; José Antonio Griñán (PSOE–A)
Ballot →	22 April 2009
Required majority →	55 out of 109
Yes: • PSOE–A (56)	56 / 109
No: • PP (47); • IULV–CA (6)	53 / 109
Abstentions	0 / 109
Absentees	0 / 109

== Council of Government ==
The Council of Government was structured into the office for the president and 15 ministries. From March 2010, the number of ministries was reduced to 13.

← Griñán I Government → (24 April 2009 – 7 May 2012)
Portfolio	Name	Party	Took office	Left office	Ref.
President	José Antonio Griñán	PSOE–A	23 April 2009	5 May 2012	
Minister of the Presidency	Antonio Ávila	PSOE–A	24 April 2009	23 March 2010	
Minister of Governance	Luis Pizarro	PSOE–A	24 April 2009	23 March 2010	
Minister of Economy and Finance	Carmen Martínez Aguayo	PSOE–A	24 April 2009	23 March 2010	
Minister of Education	Mar Moreno	PSOE–A	24 April 2009	23 March 2010	
Minister of Justice and Public Administration	Begoña Álvarez Civantos	PSOE–A	24 April 2009	23 March 2010	
Minister of Innovation, Science and Business	Martín Soler	PSOE–A	24 April 2009	23 March 2010	
Minister of Public Works and Transports	Rosa Aguilar	Independent	24 April 2009	23 March 2010	
Minister of Employment	Antonio Fernández García	PSOE–A	24 April 2009	23 March 2010	
Minister of Health	María Jesús Montero	PSOE–A	24 April 2009	7 May 2012	
Minister of Agriculture and Fisheries	Clara Aguilera	PSOE–A	24 April 2009	7 May 2012	
Minister of Housing and Territory Planning	Juan Espadas	PSOE–A	24 April 2009	23 March 2010	
Minister of Tourism, Trade and Sports	Luciano Alonso	PSOE–A	24 April 2009	7 May 2012	
Minister of Equality and Social Welfare	Micaela Navarro	PSOE–A	24 April 2009	7 May 2012	
Minister of Culture	Rosario Torres	PSOE–A	24 April 2009	23 March 2010	
Minister of Environment	Cinta Castillo	PSOE–A	24 April 2009	23 March 2010	
=== Changes March 2010 ===
Portfolio	Name	Party	Took office	Left office	Ref.
Minister of the Presidency	Mar Moreno	PSOE–A	23 March 2010	7 May 2012	
Minister of Governance and Justice (Note: On 23 March 2010, the ministries of Economy and Finance and Innovation, Science and Business were reorganized as the Finance and Public Administration and Economy, Innovation and Science departments, respectively. Concurrently, the Ministry of Justice and Public Administration was disestablished and its competences transferred to the Governance and Justice (Justice) and Finance and Public Administration (Public Administration) departments. Simultaneously, the Ministry of Housing and Territory Planning was disestablished and its competences transferred to the Ministry of Public Works and Housing.)	Luis Pizarro	PSOE–A	23 March 2010	5 April 2011	
Minister of Finance and Public Administration	Carmen Martínez Aguayo	PSOE–A	23 March 2010	7 May 2012	
~~Minister of Justice and Public Administration~~	Disestablished on 23 March 2010.				
Minister of Education	Francisco Álvarez de la Chica	PSOE–A	23 March 2010	7 May 2012	
Minister of Economy, Innovation and Science	Antonio Ávila	PSOE–A	23 March 2010	7 May 2012	
Minister of Public Works and Housing	Rosa Aguilar	Independent	23 March 2010	21 October 2010	
Minister of Employment	Manuel Recio	PSOE–A	23 March 2010	7 May 2012	
~~Minister of Housing and Territory Planning~~	Disestablished on 23 March 2010.				
Minister of Culture	Paulino Plata	PSOE–A	23 March 2010	7 May 2012	
Minister of Environment	José Juan Díaz Trillo	PSOE–A	23 March 2010	7 May 2012	
=== Changes October 2010 ===
Portfolio	Name	Party	Took office	Left office	Ref.
Minister of Public Works and Housing	Josefina Cruz Villalón	PSOE–A	21 October 2010	7 May 2012	
=== Changes April 2011 ===
Portfolio	Name	Party	Took office	Left office	Ref.
Minister of Governance and Justice	Francisco Menacho	PSOE–A	5 April 2011	7 May 2012	

== Notes ==
Preceded by Chaves VI	Regional Government of Andalusia; 2009–2012	Succeeded by Griñán II
