= 2000 Andalusian regional election =

Election in the Spanish region of Andalusia

- 12 March 2000

All 109 seats in the Parliament of Andalusia 55 seats needed for a majority
- Opinion polls
- Registered: 5,918,722 ▲6.1%
- Turnout: 4,066,830 (68.7%) ▼9.2 pp
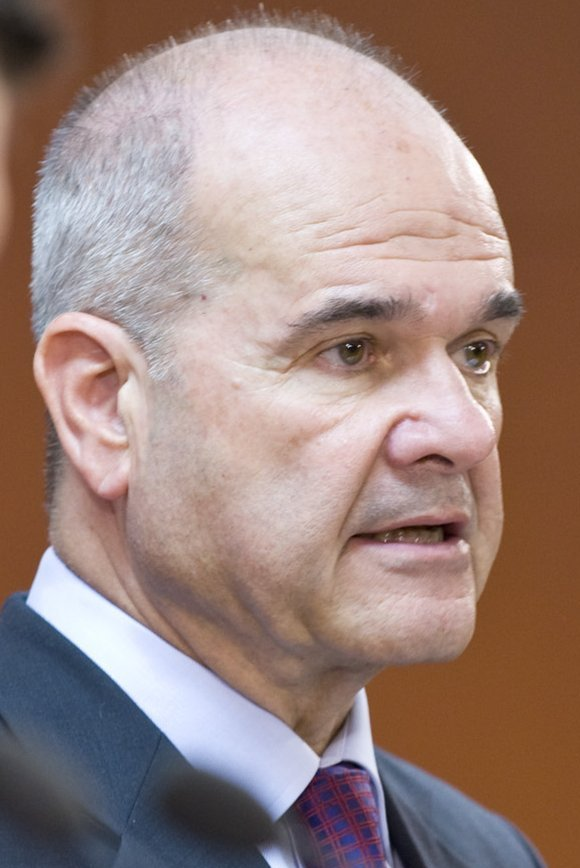

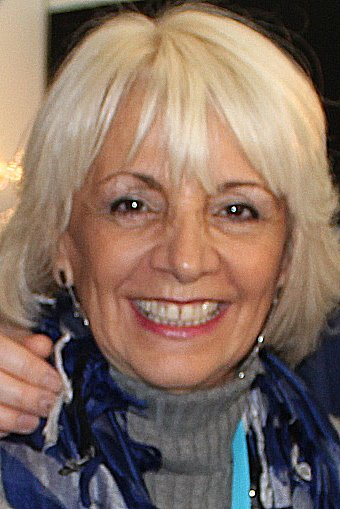

	First party	Second party	Third party
Leader	Manuel Chaves	Teófila Martínez	Antonio Romero
Party	PSOE–A	PP	IULV–CA
Leader since	19 April 1990	20 February 1999	28 July 1996
Leader's seat	Cádiz	Cádiz	Málaga
Last election	52 seats, 44.1%	40 seats, 34.0%	13 seats, 14.0%
Seats won	52	46	6
Seat change	0	▲6	▼7
Popular vote	1,790,653	1,535,987	327,435
Percentage	44.3%	38.0%	8.1%
Swing	▲0.2 pp	▲4.0 pp	▼5.9 pp
	Fourth party
Leader	Pedro Pacheco
Party	PA
Leader since	1994
Leader's seat	Cádiz
Last election	4 seats, 6.7%
Seats won	5
Seat change	▲1
Popular vote	300,356
Percentage	7.4%
Swing	▲0.7 pp
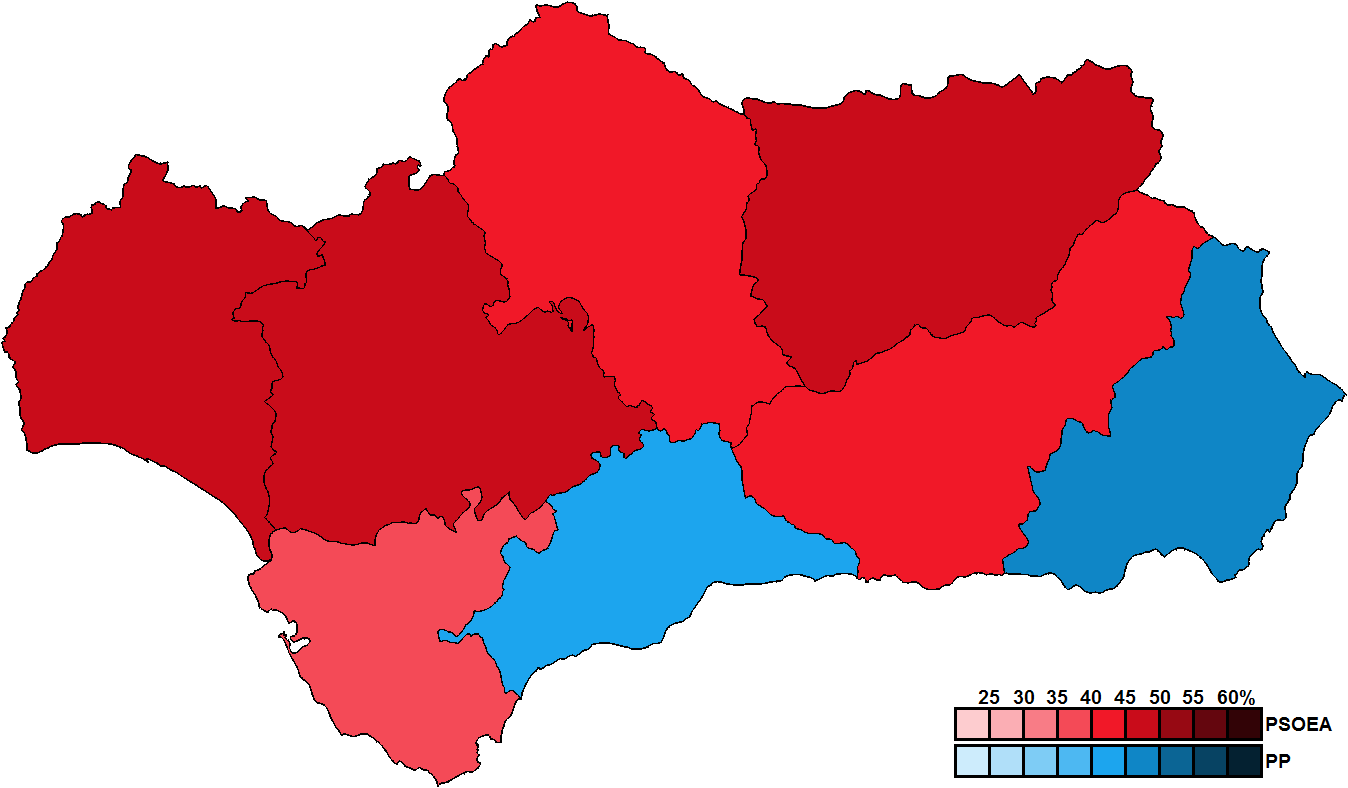
- Constituency results map for the Parliament of Andalusia
President before election
Manuel Chaves
PSOE–A
President after election
Manuel Chaves
PSOE–A

A regional election was held in Andalusia on 12 March 2000 to elect the 6th Parliament of the autonomous community. All 109 seats in the Parliament were up for election. It was held concurrently with the 2000 Spanish general election.

The ruling Spanish Socialist Workers' Party of Andalusia (PSOE–A) of Manuel Chaves won with a relative majority of 52 and was re-elected for a fourth term as president of the Regional Government of Andalusia with the support of the Andalusian Party (PA). The opposition People's Party (PP) secured its best result in a regional election up to that point, whereas United Left/The Greens–Assembly for Andalusia (IULV–CA) saw a major decrease in both votes and seats.

== Overview ==
Under the 1981 Statute of Autonomy, the Parliament of Andalusia was the unicameral legislature of the homonymous autonomous community, having legislative power in devolved matters, as well as the ability to grant or withdraw confidence from a regional president. The electoral and procedural rules were supplemented by national law provisions.

=== Date ===
The term of the Parliament of Andalusia expired four years after the date of its previous election, unless it was dissolved earlier. The election decree was required to be issued no later than 25 days before the scheduled expiration date of parliament and published on the following day in the Official Gazette of the Regional Government of Andalusia (BOJA), with election day taking place 54 days after the decree's publication (barring any date within from 1 July to 31 August). The previous election was held on 3 March 1996, which meant that the chamber's term would have expired on 3 March 2000. The election decree was required to be published in the BOJA no later than 8 February 2000, setting the latest possible date for election day on 2 April 2000.

The regional president had the prerogative to dissolve the Parliament of Andalusia at any given time and call a snap election, provided that no motion of no confidence was in process and that dissolution did not occur before one year after a previous one.

The Parliament of Andalusia was officially dissolved on 18 January 2000 with the publication of the corresponding decree in the BOJA, setting election day for 12 March and scheduling for the chamber to reconvene on 6 April.

=== Electoral system ===
Voting for the Parliament was based on universal suffrage, comprising all Spanish nationals over 18 years of age, registered in Andalusia and with full political rights, provided that they had not been deprived of the right to vote by a final sentence, nor were legally incapacitated.

The Parliament of Andalusia had a minimum of 90 and a maximum of 110 seats, with electoral provisions fixing its size at 109. All were elected in eight multi-member constituencies—corresponding to the provinces of Almería, Cádiz, Córdoba, Granada, Huelva, Jaén, Málaga and Seville, each of which was assigned an initial minimum of eight seats and the remaining 45 distributed in proportion to population (with the number of seats in each province not exceeding two times that of any other)—using the D'Hondt method and closed-list proportional voting, with a three percent-threshold of valid votes (including blank ballots) in each constituency. The use of this electoral method resulted in a higher effective threshold depending on district magnitude and vote distribution.

As a result of the aforementioned allocation, each Parliament constituency was entitled the following seats:

Seats	Constituencies
18	Seville^{(−1)}
16	Málaga^{(+1)}
15	Cádiz
13	Córdoba, Granada
12	Jaén
11	Almería, Huelva

The law did not provide for by-elections to fill vacant seats; instead, any vacancies arising after the proclamation of candidates and during the legislative term were filled by the next candidates on the party lists or, when required, by designated substitutes.

=== Outgoing parliament ===
The table below shows the composition of the parliamentary groups in the chamber at the time of dissolution.

Parliamentary composition in January 2000
Groups	Parties	Legislators	
Groups	Parties	Seats	Total
Socialist Parliamentary Group	PSOE–A	52	52
Andalusian People's Parliamentary Group	PP	40	40
United Left/The Greens Parliamentary Group	IULV–CA	13	13
Andalusian Parliamentary Group	PA	4	4

== Parties and candidates ==
The electoral law allowed for parties and federations registered in the interior ministry, alliances and groupings of electors to present lists of candidates. Parties and federations intending to form an alliance were required to inform the relevant electoral commission within 10 days of the election call, whereas groupings of electors needed to secure the signature of at least one percent of the electorate in the constituencies for which they sought election, disallowing electors from signing for more than one list.

Below is a list of the main parties and alliances which contested the election:

Candidacy	Parties and alliances	Leading candidate	Ideology	Previous result		Gov.	Ref.
Candidacy	Parties and alliances	Leading candidate	Ideology	Vote %	Seats	Gov.	Ref.
PSOE–A	List: Spanish Socialist Workers' Party of Andalusia (PSOE–A)	Manuel Chaves	Social democracy	44.1%	52	Yes	
PP	List: People's Party (PP)	Teófila Martínez	Conservatism; Christian democracy	34.0%	40	No	
IULV–CA	List: United Left/The Greens–Assembly for Andalusia (IULV–CA) – Communist Party of Andalusia (PCA) – Socialist Action Party (PASOC) – Republican Left (IR) – Collective for the Unity of Workers–Andalusian Left Bloc (CUT–BAI) – Revolutionary Workers' Party (POR) – Workers' Revolutionary Party (PRT)	Antonio Romero	Socialism; Communism	14.0%	13	No	
PA	List: Andalusian Party (PA); Andalusian Forum (FA); Socialist Party of Andalusia (PSA)	Pedro Pacheco	Andalusian nationalism Social democracy	6.7%	4	Yes	

== Campaign ==
=== Debates ===
2000 Andalusian regional election debates
Date	Organizer(s)	Moderator(s)	P Present (Note: Denotes a main invitee attending the event.) S Surrogate (Note: Denotes a main invitee not attending the event, sending a surrogate in their place.) NI Not invited I Invited A Absent invitee					
Date	Organizer(s)	Moderator(s)	PSOE–A	PP	IULV–CA	PA	Audience	Ref.
1 March	RTVA	Tom Martín Benítez	P Chaves	P Martínez	P Romero	P Pacheco	20.2% (520,000)	

== Opinion polls ==
The tables below list opinion polling results in reverse chronological order, showing the most recent first and using the dates when the survey fieldwork was done, as opposed to the date of publication. Where the fieldwork dates are unknown, the date of publication is given instead. The highest percentage figure in each polling survey is displayed with its background shaded in the leading party's colour. If a tie ensues, this is applied to the figures with the highest percentages. The "Lead" column on the right shows the percentage-point difference between the parties with the highest percentages in a poll.

=== Graphical summary ===
Local regression trend line of poll results from 3 March 1996 to 12 March 2000, with each line corresponding to a political party.

=== Voting intention estimates ===
The table below lists weighted voting intention estimates. Refusals are generally excluded from the party vote percentages, while question wording and the treatment of "don't know" responses and those not intending to vote may vary between polling organisations. When available, seat projections determined by the polling organisations are displayed below (or in place of) the percentages in a smaller font; 55 seats were required for an absolute majority in the Parliament of Andalusia.

Color key:

Exit poll

Polling firm/Commissioner	Fieldwork date	Sample size	Turnout	PSOE–A	PP	IULV	PA	Lead
2000 regional election	12 Mar 2000	—N/a	68.7	44.3; 52	38.0; 46	8.1; 6	7.4; 5	6.3
Eco Consulting/RTVE	12 Mar 2000	?	?	44.3; 50/54	36.0; 42/45	9.0; 7/10	7.6; 5/7	8.3
Sigma Dos/El Mundo	4 Mar 2000	?	?	? 52/54	? 42/46	? 6/8	? 5	?
Ipsos–Eco/ABC	25–29 Feb 2000	2,500	?	42.8; 52/55	35.3; 39/41	10.7; 10	8.1; 5/6	7.5
CIS	11–28 Feb 2000	4,212	?	42.5; 52/54	36.6; 41/43	10.8; 8/9	7.6; 5/6	5.9
Demoscopia/El País	18–23 Feb 2000	2,521	74	44.6; 53/55	35.5; 41/43	10.8; 8/9	8.1; 4	9.1
Ipsos–Eco/ABC	11–15 Feb 2000	1,000	?	42.3	36.0	10.7	9.2	6.3
Sigma Dos/El Mundo	5 Jan 2000	?	?	44.0– 45.0; 49/53	37.0– 38.0; 44/48	8.0– 9.0; 6/8	7.0– 8.0; 5	7.0
PP	12 Dec 1999	?	?	? 50/54	? 41/44	? 9	? 3/4	?
Metra Seis/PA	6–25 Oct 1999	2,400	?	43.4; 48/52	32.1; 35/41	11.6; 11/12	11.6; 8/10	11.3
Opina/CEA	22–24 Oct 1999	2,400	?	46.0; 52/55	35.5; 41/44	? 8/11	? 3/6	10.5
1999 EP election	10 Jun 1999	—N/a	63.6	43.3 (53)	36.0 (43)	10.7 (9)	6.6 (4)	7.3
Opina/CEA	3–15 May 1999	3,200	?	42.5; 50/51	36.0; 42/44	12.0; 11/12	7.5; 4/6	6.5
Demoscopia/El País (Note: Undecided and/or abstentionists excluded.)	18–22 Feb 1999	1,200	65.3	42.3	33.5	12.3	9.6	8.8
Eco Consulting/ABC	18–20 Feb 1999	508	?	41.4	37.0	12.9	8.3	4.4
PSOE	15–19 Feb 1999	1,200	?	47.8	30.9	11.6	8.9	16.9
Metra Seis/PA	10–15 Sep 1998	1,200	?	40.3; 45/49	31.8; 35/38	12.5; 11	14.5; 14/15	8.5
PSOE	5 Jul 1998	?	?	46.6	31.5	11.8	9.2	15.1
Demoscopia/El País	17–23 Feb 1998	1,200	68.9	47.2	34.1	9.9	7.5	13.1
PSOE	7 Feb 1998	?	?	44.8	34.7	12.3	6.6	10.1
Inner Line/PSOE	12 Dec 1997	1,200	?	45.1	32.7	10.8	10.2	12.4
Metra Seis/PA	25 Sep 1997	3,200	?	41.7; 46/50	32.4; 35/39	10.6; 10/11	13.8; 12/15	9.3
PP	12–18 May 1997	2,400	?	41.6; 47/50	37.0; 42/44	14.8; 11	5.5; 2/3	4.6
PSOE	29 Jan–1 Feb 1997	?	?	45.0	32.5	12.0	9.0	12.5
1996 regional election	3 Mar 1996	—N/a	78.1	44.1; 52	34.0; 40	14.0; 13	6.7; 4	10.1

=== Voting preferences ===
The table below lists raw, unweighted voting preferences.

Polling firm/Commissioner	Fieldwork date	Sample size	PSOE–A	PP	IULV	PA	Question	X mark	Lead
2000 regional election (Note: Does not include non-resident citizens.)	12 Mar 2000	—N/a	30.6	26.4	5.6	5.2	—N/a	30.2	4.2
CIS	11–28 Feb 2000	4,212	30.1	22.9	5.4	5.6	28.3	6.0	7.2
1999 EP election	10 Jun 1999	—N/a	27.7	23.1	6.9	4.3	—N/a	35.4	4.6
1996 regional election	3 Mar 1996	—N/a	33.8	26.2	10.8	5.1	—N/a	21.7	7.6

=== Victory preferences ===
The table below lists opinion polling on the victory preferences for each party in the event of a regional election taking place.

Polling firm/Commissioner	Fieldwork date	Sample size	PSOE–A	PP	IULV	PA	Other/ None	Question	Lead
CIS	11–28 Feb 2000	4,212	35.0	24.7	6.5	6.5	1.3	26.1	10.3

=== Victory likelihood ===
The table below lists opinion polling on the perceived likelihood of victory for each party in the event of a regional election taking place.

Polling firm/Commissioner	Fieldwork date	Sample size	PSOE–A	PP	IULV	PA	Other/ None	Question	Lead
CIS	11–28 Feb 2000	4,212	60.4	9.6	0.4	0.8	0.3	28.7	50.8

=== Preferred President ===
The table below lists opinion polling on leader preferences to become president of the Regional Government of Andalusia.

Polling firm/Commissioner	Fieldwork date	Sample size					Other/ None/ Not care	Question	Lead
Polling firm/Commissioner	Fieldwork date	Sample size	Chaves PSOE–A	Martínez PP	Romero IULV	Pacheco PA	Other/ None/ Not care	Question	Lead
CIS	11–28 Feb 2000	4,212	38.3	22.3	5.8	6.9	3.8	22.8	16.0

== Results ==
=== Overall ===
← Summary of the 12 March 2000 Parliament of Andalusia election results →
Parties and alliances	Popular vote			Seats	
Parties and alliances	Votes	%	±pp	Total	+/−
Spanish Socialist Workers' Party of Andalusia (PSOE–A)	1,790,653	44.32	+0.27	52	±0
People's Party (PP)	1,535,987	38.02	+4.06	46	+6
United Left/The Greens–Assembly for Andalusia (IULV–CA)	327,435	8.11	−5.86	6	−7
Andalusian Party (PA)	300,356	7.43	+0.77	5	+1
Andalusian Left (IA)	10,232	0.25	New	0	±0
Andalusian Nation (NA)	5,034	0.12	−0.02	0	±0
Humanist Party (PH)	4,389	0.11	+0.01	0	±0
Andalusia Assembly (A)	4,380	0.11	New	0	±0
The Phalanx (FE)	2,754	0.07	New	0	±0
Almerian Regionalist Union (URAL)	1,550	0.04	New	0	±0
Green Ecologist Alternative of Marbella and San Pedro de Alcántara (AEV)	1,304	0.03	New	0	±0
Party of the Separated and Divorced (PSD)	1,180	0.03	New	0	±0
Independent Spanish Phalanx (FEI)	1,018	0.03	New	0	±0
Voice of the Andalusian People (VDPA)	732	0.02	±0.00	0	±0
Centrist Union–Democratic and Social Centre (UC–CDS)	492	0.01	−0.03	0	±0
National Union (UN)	415	0.01	New	0	±0
Blank ballots	51,921	1.29	+0.52		
Total	4,039,832			109	±0
Valid votes	4,039,832	99.34	−0.03		
Invalid votes	26,998	0.66	+0.03		
Votes cast / turnout	4,066,830	68.71	−9.23		
Abstentions	1,851,892	31.29	+9.23		
Registered voters	5,918,722				

Popular vote
PSOE–A	44.32%
PP	38.02%
IULV–CA	8.11%
PA	7.43%
Others	0.83%
Blank ballots	1.29%

Seats
PSOE–A	47.70%
PP	42.20%
IULV–CA	5.50%
PA	4.59%

=== Distribution by constituency ===
Constituency	PSOE–A		PP		IULV–CA		PA	
Constituency	%	S	%	S	%	S	%	S
Almería	43.0	5	46.4	6	4.5	−	3.7	−
Cádiz	39.5	6	37.4	6	6.3	1	14.5	2
Córdoba	40.7	6	38.3	5	12.3	1	6.9	1
Granada	44.7	6	40.9	6	7.4	1	5.2	−
Huelva	47.1	6	37.8	5	7.0	−	6.5	−
Jaén	48.2	6	38.2	5	7.3	1	4.9	−
Málaga	40.1	7	41.1	7	8.9	1	7.3	1
Seville	49.5	10	32.3	6	8.6	1	7.2	1
Total	44.3	52	38.0	46	8.1	6	7.4	5

== Aftermath ==
=== Government formation ===
Investiture; Nomination of Manuel Chaves (PSOE–A)
Ballot →	25 April 2000
Required majority →	55 out of 109
Yes: • PSOE–A (52); • PA (5)	57 / 109
No: • PP (46); • IULV–CA (6)	52 / 109
Abstentions	0 / 109
Absentees	0 / 109

== Bibliography ==
- Ley Orgánica 6/1981, de 30 de diciembre, de Estatuto de Autonomía para Andalucía (Organic Law 6/1981). Official State Gazette (in Spanish). 30 December 1981. BOE-A-1982-633.
- Ley 6/1983, de 21 de julio, del Gobierno y la Administración de la Comunidad Autónoma (Law 6/1983). Official State Gazette (in Spanish). 21 July 1983. BOE-A-1983-23960.
- Ley Orgánica 5/1985, de 19 de junio, del Régimen Electoral General (Organic Law 5/1985). Official State Gazette (in Spanish). 19 June 1985 [version as of 22 April 1999]. BOE-A-1985-11672.
- Ley 1/1986, de 2 de enero, Electoral de Andalucía (Law 1/1986). Official State Gazette (in Spanish). 2 January 1986 [version as of 25 May 1994]. BOE-A-1986-2788.
- Ley 6/1994, de 18 de mayo, de Modificación de la Ley 6/1983, de 21 de julio, del Gobierno y la Administración de la Comunidad Autónoma, y la Ley 1/1986, de 2 de enero, Electoral de Andalucía (Law 6/1994). Official State Gazette (in Spanish). 18 May 1994. BOE-A-1994-14602.
- Decreto del Presidente 1/2000, de 17 de enero, de disolución del Parlamento de Andalucía y de convocatoria de Elecciones (PDF) (Decree 1/2000). Official Gazette of the Regional Government of Andalusia (in Spanish). 17 January 2000.
