= El Relleno =

Former football venue in Vigo

- Location: Vigo, Galicia, Spain

Construction
- Opened: 1876
- Demolished: 1910

Tenants
- Exiles FC (1876–1908) Vigo FC (1905–1908)

El Relleno, otherwise known as the Alameda landfill area, was a sports venue in the city of Vigo, Spain. Vigo, the home of football, has its origins in El Relleno, where it served as the home ground of the very first football clubs in the city and the pitch for the very first football games played in Vigo. This led to the first recognized game being played in Vigo on 9 February, 1905 between Exiles FC and Exmouth, where the ground then became the first home to Vigo FC.

== Origins ==
Throughout the 19th century, Vigo suffered a couple of natural land reclamations, including a particularly large piece of land that had reclaimed during the mid-19th century. On that location, a mall with gardens would later be built, and today bears the name of Emilio García Olloqui. Emilio was the person responsible for expanding the city towards the sea. This landfill soon became known as El Relleno due to its proximity to the Relleno Squares. In the 1870s, an International Communications Telegraph Center was established in Vigo, known as "El Cable Inglés". The English Cable workers soon established a sports club in 1873 called the Exiles Cable Club, which afterwards formed a football section in 1876 known as Exiles Football Club. Often times the crews of the British ships would be challenged to a football match at the Alameda landfill area located near the port. Playing football games against the crews of English ships, ranging from sailors to captains through officers were a norm. The games were held in El Relleno, which officially became one of the first football fields in the country.

== El Relleno dominance ==
El Relleno became the home of football in Vigo and began to bring together hundreds of people, especially on Sundays. Eventually, some Spaniards who were studying in England or France began to be incorporated into these British-origin teams from Vigo.

On 9 February 1905, El Relleno hosted the first recorded Vigo football match in which the Exiles FC played against a team made up of sailors from the British battleship, HMS Exmouth, which was anchored in the port at the time, in front of a large crowd at the Alameda landfill area, known as El Relleno. The Vigo fans supported the players of Cable Inglés, who were believed to be the team representing the city.

On the following day, 10 February, a group of students from Vigo confronted the sailors of the British battleship HMS Triumph, challenging them to a football match in Relleno but lost the game 3–0. This is historically significant because it was one of the first times that the youth of Vigo showed interest in that new sport. Moreover, the many spectators who had attended El Relleno to witness the match were pleased with the quality of the venue and game. There were great expectations among the football enthusiasts of Vigo, who soon created a club of their own, Vigo Football Club.

Three months later, on 14 May 1905, the newly-created Vigo FC played against the Exiles, and they lost 0–1 to the British, with a goal that was achieved almost at the end of the game. The venue no longer had the capacity for the growing crowd. The limits of the field of play were highlighted before the game, but due to a lack of options, the game was held there. Finally, with a large audience at the Relleno, the Vigo FC players took to the field wearing a red and white checkered shirt and white shorts, which were the colours of the city. Vigo FC's first-ever line-up included the likes of the Ocaña brothers (Andrés and Manuel) and César Rodríguez.

Another club known as Petit Football Club was established in May of 1905, and the club's home ground was the Relleno field. It was Petit who defeated the "invincible" team of Cable Inglés. The fans who had come to El Relleno to witness this match was enormous when they saw how Petit FC achieved an unexpected victory against the English in a sensational match, defeating them 2–0. Some of the players who lined up for Petit that day were goalkeeper Raúl López, César Rodríguez, Francisco Estévez, Roberto Pérez and Rafael Tapias, with the latter two being the goal scorers, which were loudly and widely applauded by the entire Vigo public, who could not believe their team's victory. This triumph of Petit FC against Cable Inglés was a pivotal event in football in Vigo.

== Decline and collapse ==
Exiles continued to play in the El Relleno until the end of 1910, the year in which the venue was demolished. The exact year of the closure is unknown.

Nowadays, El Relleno has since been urbanized into six residential blocks of houses and divided by the current Luis Taboada street.
