= José Antonio Nieto =

Spanish politician

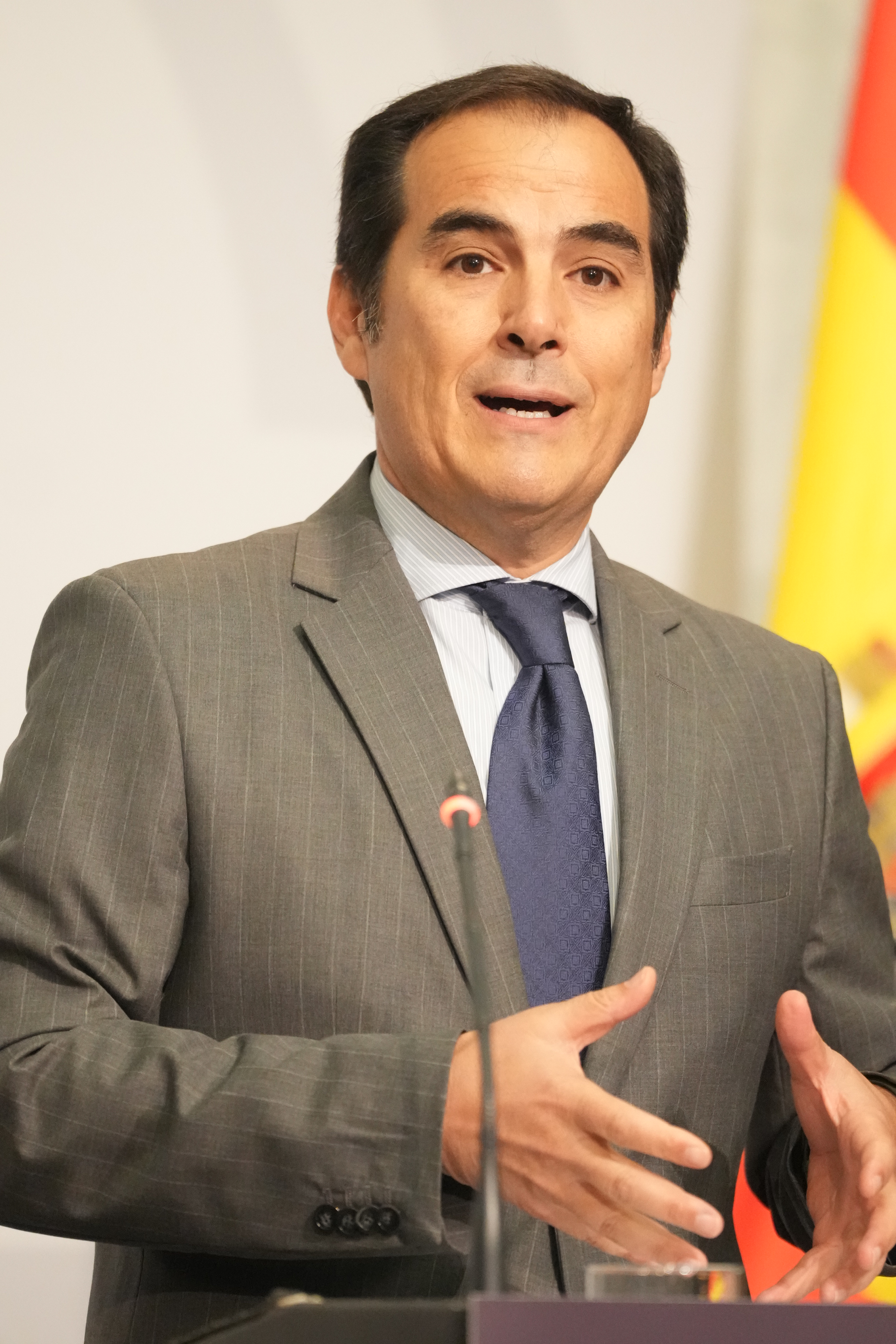
- Nieto in 2025

Minister of Justice, Local Administration and Public Civil Service of Andalusia
- Incumbent
- Assumed office 26 July 2022
- President: Juanma Moreno

Secretary of State for Security
- In office 18 November 2016 – 14 June 2018
- Minister: Juan Ignacio Zoido
- Preceded by: Francisco Martínez Vázquez
- Succeeded by: Ana Botella

Mayor of Córdoba
- In office 11 June 2011 – 13 June 2015
- Preceded by: Andrés Ocaña
- Succeeded by: Isabel Ambrosio

Member of the Parliament of Andalusia
- In office 3 March 2008 – 11 November 2014
- Constituency: Córdoba
- In office 27 December 2018 – 14 July 2022
- Constituency: Córdoba

Member of the Congress of Deputies
- In office 7 January 2016 – 25 November 2016
- Constituency: Córdoba

Personal details
- Born: 10 April 1970 (age 56) Guadalcázar, Spain
- Party: People's Party; Democratic and Social Centre (until 1990s)
- Education: University of Córdoba

José Antonio Nieto Ballesteros (born 10 April 1970) is a Spanish politician of the People's Party.

He was a city councillor in Guadalcázar (1995–1999) and Córdoba (1999–2016), as well as mayor of the latter from 2011 to 2015. He was also a member of the Parliament of Andalusia (2008–2014; 2018–2022), and the Congress of Deputies for the two legislatures of 2016.

Nieto was Spain's Secretary of State for Security from 2016 to 2018. He was named the Minister of Justice in the Regional Government of Andalusia in 2022.

== Biography ==
=== Early life and career ===
Born in Guadalcázar in the Province of Córdoba, Nieto graduated with a law degree from the University of Córdoba. He began in politics with the Democratic and Social Centre (CDS), for whom he was their youth leader in Andalusia from 1989 to 1991. He was a candidate in the 1989 Spanish general election and the 1990 Andalusian regional election.

Switching to the People's Party (PP), Nieto was a councillor in Guadalcázar from 1995 to 1999, when he was elected to the same body in Córdoba. He was also a member of the provincial deputation from 1999 to 2005, and was elected leader of the PP in Córdoba in 2006, remaining so until 2017.

=== Mayor of Córdoba ===
Nieto was elected to the Parliament of Andalusia in 2008. In the 2011 Spanish local elections he was elected mayor of Córdoba as the PP won an absolute majority with 16 out of 29 seats, ending 12 years of left-wing governance in the city. His predecessor, Andrés Ocaña of the United Left (IU), did not attend the ceremony. Nieto pledged an austerity plan that he said would save €20 million from the municipal budget.

Nieto resigned from the Parliament of Andalusia in October 2014 after the Constitutional Court upheld a regional law disallowing mayors from holding a seat in the legislature. Nonetheless, he was placed 12th in the PP list for the Córdoba constituency in the 2015 Andalusian regional election – a placement that would require a 100% victory for him to be elected.

=== Congressman and Secretary of State ===
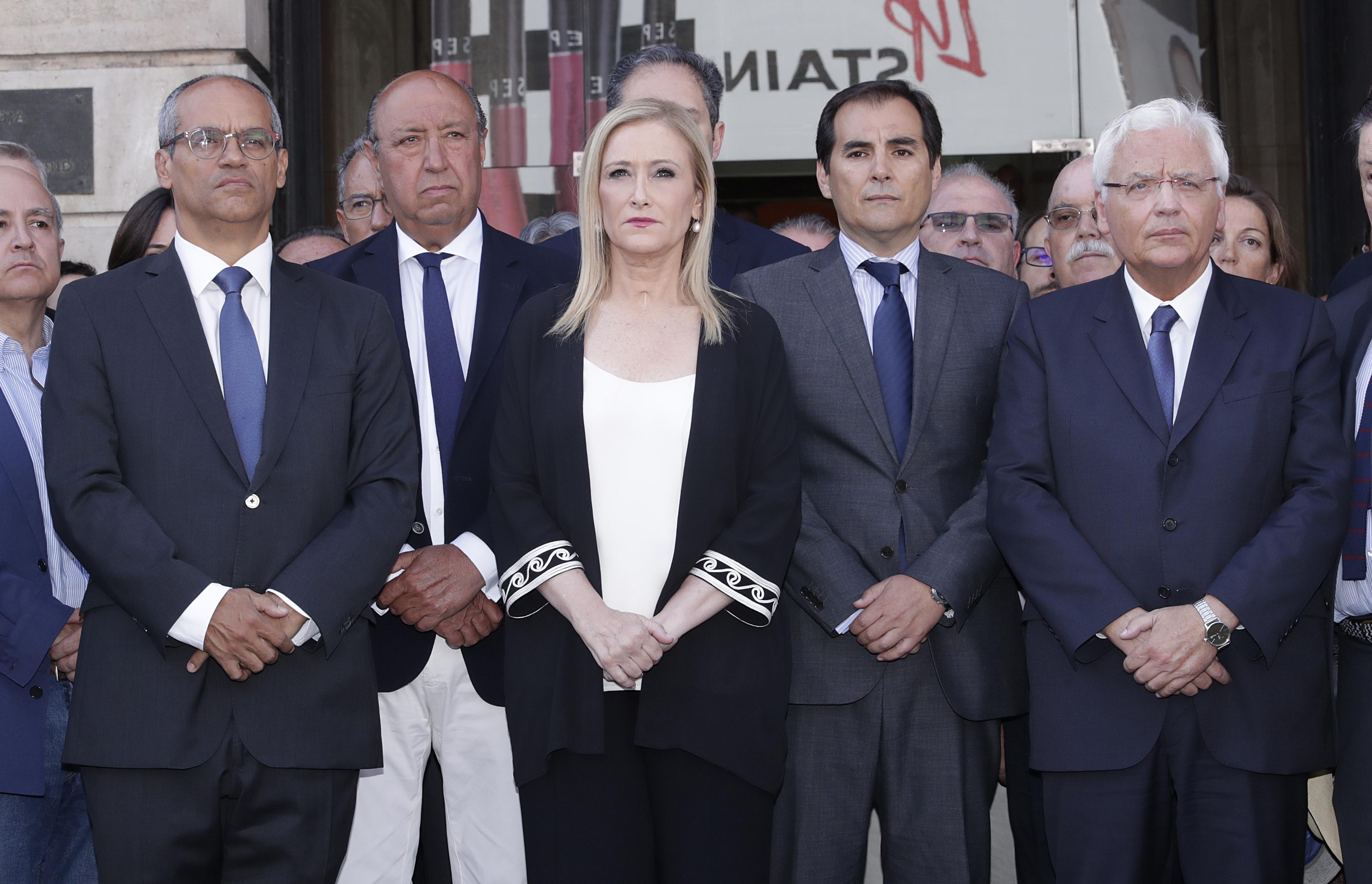
Nieto (front, second from right) at a minute's silence for the victims of the 2017 Barcelona attacks

After the 2015 elections, Nieto's PP were the largest party in Córdoba but short of a majority. He offered to form a three-party coalition government with the Spanish Socialist Workers' Party (PSOE) and Citizens. In the end, PSOE candidate Isabel Ambrosio was elected mayor with the support of the 7 councillors from her party, and 4 each from the IU and local left-wing party Ganemos.

Nieto was chosen as the PP's list leader in the Córdoba constituency for the 2015 Spanish general election, replacing fellow former capital mayor Rafael Merino. After being elected again in 2016, he was named Secretary of State for Security, serving under Juan Ignacio Zoido in the Ministry of the Interior. He left his seats in Córdoba City Council and the Congress of Deputies upon this appointment. In 2018, he was awarded the Grand Cross of the Order of Civil Merit.

=== Return to regional politics ===
Having lost his national role due to a change of government, Nieto returned to regional politics and was placed first in the PP's list in Córdoba for the 2018 Andalusian regional election. After one four-year term, he announced that he would not run for re-election in the next election as he wanted there to be new figures in the party; he said that he wished to continue working with Juanma Moreno, the leader of the People's Party of Andalusia and President of the Regional Government of Andalusia.

The PP under Moreno won an absolute majority in those elections. In July 2022, Nieto was appointed as Minister of Justice in Moreno's second government.
