= Second government of José Antonio Griñán =

2nd government of José Antonio Griñán
- 11th Government of Andalusia
- 2012–2013
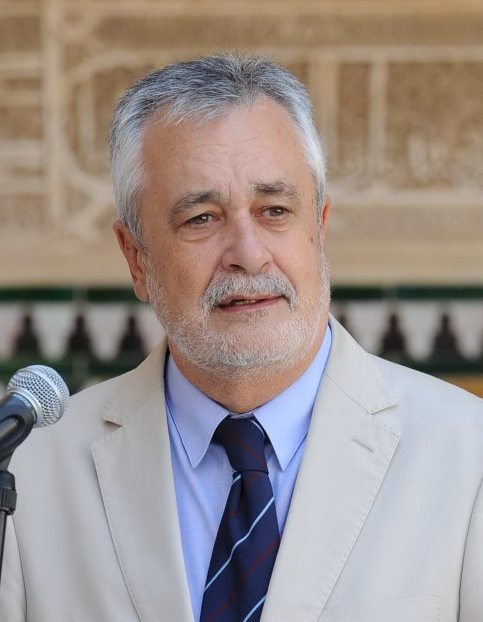
- José Antonio Griñán in July 2012.
- Date formed: 7 May 2012
- Date dissolved: 10 September 2013

People and organisations
- Monarch: Juan Carlos I
- President: José Antonio Griñán
- Vice President: Diego Valderas
- No. of ministers: 11 (Note: Does not include the President.)
- Total no. of members: 11
- Member parties: PSOE–A; IULV–CA
- Status in legislature: Majority coalition government
- Opposition party: PP
- Opposition leader: Juan Ignacio Zoido

History
- Election: 2012 regional election
- Outgoing election: 2015 regional election
- Legislature term: 9th Parliament
- Predecessor: Griñán I
- Successor: Díaz I

The second government of José Antonio Griñán was formed on 7 May 2012 following the latter's election as President of Andalusia by the Parliament of Andalusia on 3 May and his swearing-in on 5 May, as a result of the Socialist Party of Andalusia (PSOE–A) and United Left (IULV–CA) being able to muster a majority of seats in Parliament following the 2012 Andalusian regional election, despite the People's Party (PP) emerging as the largest parliamentary force. It succeeded the first Griñán government and was the Government of Andalusia from 7 May 2012 to 10 September 2013, a total of 491 days, or 1 year, 4 months and 3 days.

The cabinet comprised members of the PSOE–A (including one independent) and IULV–CA, to become the third coalition government ever in Andalusia and the first one comprising IU members. It was automatically dismissed on 27 August 2013 as a consequence of Griñán's resignation as president, but remained in acting capacity until the next government was sworn in.

== Investiture ==
Investiture; José Antonio Griñán (PSOE–A)
Ballot →	3 May 2012 (Note: 1 IULV–CA MP cast an invalid ballot.)
Required majority →	55 out of 109
Yes: • PSOE–A (47); • IULV–CA (11)	58 / 109
No: • PP (50)	50 / 109
Abstentions	0 / 109
Absentees	0 / 109

== Council of Government ==
The Council of Government was structured into the offices for the president, the vice president and 11 ministries.

← Griñán II Government → (7 May 2012 – 10 September 2013)
Portfolio	Name	Party	Took office	Left office	Ref.
President	José Antonio Griñán	PSOE–A	5 May 2012	6 September 2013	
Vice President; Minister of Local Administration and Institutional Relations	Diego Valderas	IULV–CA	7 May 2012	10 September 2013	
Minister of the Presidency and Equality	Susana Díaz	PSOE–A	7 May 2012	10 September 2013	
Minister of Justice and Interior	Emilio de Llera	Independent	7 May 2012	10 September 2013	
Minister of Education	Mar Moreno	PSOE–A	7 May 2012	10 September 2013	
Minister of Economy, Innovation, Science and Employment	Antonio Ávila	PSOE–A	7 May 2012	10 September 2013	
Minister of Finance and Public Administration	Carmen Martínez Aguayo	PSOE–A	7 May 2012	10 September 2013	
Minister of Development and Housing	Elena Cortés	IULV–CA	7 May 2012	10 September 2013	
Minister of Agriculture, Fisheries and Environment	Luis Planas	PSOE–A	7 May 2012	10 September 2013	
Minister of Health and Social Welfare	María Jesús Montero	PSOE–A	7 May 2012	10 September 2013	
Minister of Tourism and Trade	Rafael Rodríguez Bermúdez	IULV–CA	7 May 2012	10 September 2013	
Minister of Culture and Sports	Luciano Alonso	PSOE–A	7 May 2012	10 September 2013	

== Notes ==
Preceded by Griñán I	Regional Government of Andalusia; 2012–2013	Succeeded by Díaz I
