= Exiles Cable Club =

Spanish multi-sports club

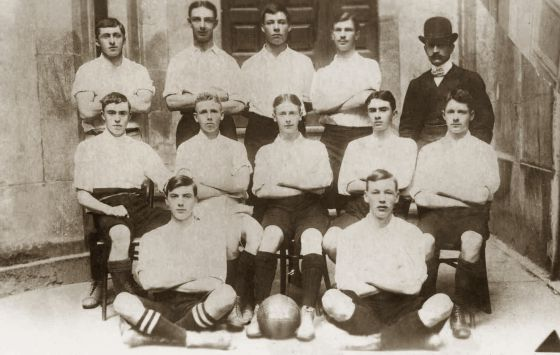
- Players of the football section of the Exiles Cable Club
- Founded: 1873
- Dissolved: Unknown (Early-20th century)
- Ground: El Relleno
| Home colours | Away colours |

The Exiles Cable Club was a multi-sports club based in Galicia, Vigo. It was founded in 1873 by English workers of the Eastern Telegraph Company. It was one of the first companies dedicated to sports in the country, most notably, football, having a section dedicated to the said sport due to its rapid growth in England, the homeland of the company's workers. Recent studies have shown that the Exiles football team, known as Exiles Foot-Ball Club or Exiles FC, was the first football club to have been recorded in the Iberian Peninsula, being one of the proto-clubs that pioneered and expanded football in Spain, together with the Rio Tinto English Club (1878) and the Cricket and Football Club of Madrid (1879).

Despite connecting Britain with many countries by telegraph and maintaining important international relations, Eastern Telegraph Company had their headquarters in Porthcurno, south of Cornwall, a small isolated town located in the far west of England, thus earning the nickname "Exiles". Besides Galicia, the club is also regarded as one of the most important entities in the amateur beginnings of football in Gibraltar, having founded the Merchants Cup (the forerunner for the Gibraltar Football League founded in 1907). It is not known with certainty what was the fate of the club, although it is known that it disappeared in the middle of the 20th century.

== Origins ==
Vigo was a port of strategic importance to the British telegraph due to its geography, as it was perfectly positioned to establish underwater telegraphic lines with the likes of Lisbon and Gibraltar, so they could transmit messages in Morse by submarine cable to them. The opening of an underwater telegraph line linking Vigo with the neighboring island of San Simón in 1863, thus becoming the first Spanish port with international telegraphic communications, consolidated the city's strategic interest as a global communications center for the management of the vast British colonial empire. And that's why in 1873, the Eastern Telegraph Company (known in Galicia as Cable Inglés, Spanish for English Cable) chose Vigo to settle. England was connected with the city and the world through these submarine telegraph cables for almost a century (1873–1969). Moreover, the Cable Inglés played a key role in World War II since it served as a bridge for encrypted messages between Germany and Japan.

Shortly after the submarine telegraphy offices were installed in Vigo in May 1873, the Exiles Cable Club was established, a sports club originally intended to serve as a means of social integration, a meeting point for employees and their families. The club organized numerous sports teams, most notably, a football team in 1876, named the Exiles Football Club.

== Football team ==
In 1876, the officers of the English ships expressly created a section of football called Exiles Football Club, this forming the first football team of which there is evidence in the Iberian Peninsula, beating the ones made in Rio Tinto (1878) and Madrid (1879) by just a few years, two places who also birthed archaic football teams through British influence. As clothing they took the colors of the flag of Cornwall, where they were originally from, thus wearing a white shirt with stockings and black trousers, replacing these with other white ones according to the occasion.

As they had no rivals in the city, the Exiles played their matches against members of the crews of English ships that usually docked in the port of Vigo, ranging from sailors to captains through officers. The meetings were held in the Relleno Squares, also known as Malecón or simply El Relleno, nowadays urbanized into six blocks of houses and divided by the current Luis Taboada street. Local newspapers of the time state: "The first football games began to be played in Vigo as soon as the English Cable arrived in May 1873," and even show evidence that a Spring Cup was even played between the different teams of English crews and the Exiles Football Club. Those first meetings ended up promoting what would later become the sport of football in the city and in the country. Thus, matches could be seen especially against the crew of the British Royal Navy.

The team began to play more and more matches as the popularity of football grew and new teams were created. On 9 February 1905, Exiles FC hosted the very first recorded football match in Vigo, in which they played against a team made up of sailors from the British battleship, HMS Exmouth, in front of a large crowd at El Relleno. The people of Vigo were devoted to Exiles FC, which was ultimately believed to be the football team that represented the city, which means that the players of Cable Inglés were the first ones to represent the football of Vigo, and they rose to the occasion with a 3–0 victory. Many spectators who had attended El Relleno to witness the match were pleasantly impressed by its spectacular nature, thus arousing great interest in the sport in Vigo, especially among the youth, who soon created a club of their own, Vigo Football Club. Three months later, on 14 May 1905, the newly created Vigo FC played against the Exiles, and despite being hotly contested they lost 0–1 to the British, with a goal that was achieved almost at the end of the game.

In 1907, Exiles FC won the Copa Pontevedra, a local competition organized by the Pontevedra Sporting Club, founded the previous year. In the Copa Pontevedra, they first beat Español FC de Vigo before defeating the hosts in the final. By the time Exiles won the Copa Pontevedra, there were already several teams in the city such as the aforementioned Vigo FC and Fortuna FC (1905), from whose merge in 1923 gave birth to Celta de Vigo. Although the two teams maintained a rivalry, Exiles FC established good relations with both clubs, collaborating with them by providing knowledge, players, (Note: The line-ups of Vigo and Fortuna during the very first official competitions organized in Galicia and Spain had players with English names such as C. Werre, Trotter or Douglas.) coaches, and even its field, since Exiles shared El Relleno with both Vigo clubs until 1908, when Vigo FC moved to Coia and Fortuna to Bouzas.

Despite some encouraging first steps, this team was never registered as a club in the country, and thus news about this team began to decline, and around the early 1910s, this society, which was never officially established, seems to disappear.

== Football in Gibraltar ==
By the end of the 19th century, Exiles FC was already playing football matches with non-British sailors or merchants as football was growing in Europe. Among them were the teams of Gibraltar, both military and civilian, who had formed their own competitions similar to those of English football. These were the Garrison Football League and the Russo Cup for the military and the Merchants Cup for the civilians. The latter was created in 1895, thus being the first football championship played on the Iberian Peninsula, and it was the forerunner for the Gibraltar Football League founded in 1907. It was in this Merchant competition promoted by the Gibraltar Football Association(GFA) and the merchants of the territory where the Exiles Football Club competed, winning two titles in the editions of 1900 and 1902. Because in Spain there was only one official national competition at the time, the Copa del Rey, and its regulations did not allow the participation of Exiles FC, thus the club's only competitive official matches were the ones at the Merchants Cups and the Copa Pontevedra.

The chronicles refer to the life of the club until the second decade of the 20th century, a date in which its disappearance can be sensed due to a lack of news.

== Honours ==
- Copa Pontevedra (1): 1907
- Merchants Cup (2): 1900, 1902.
