= José María Bellido =

Spanish politician (born 1977)

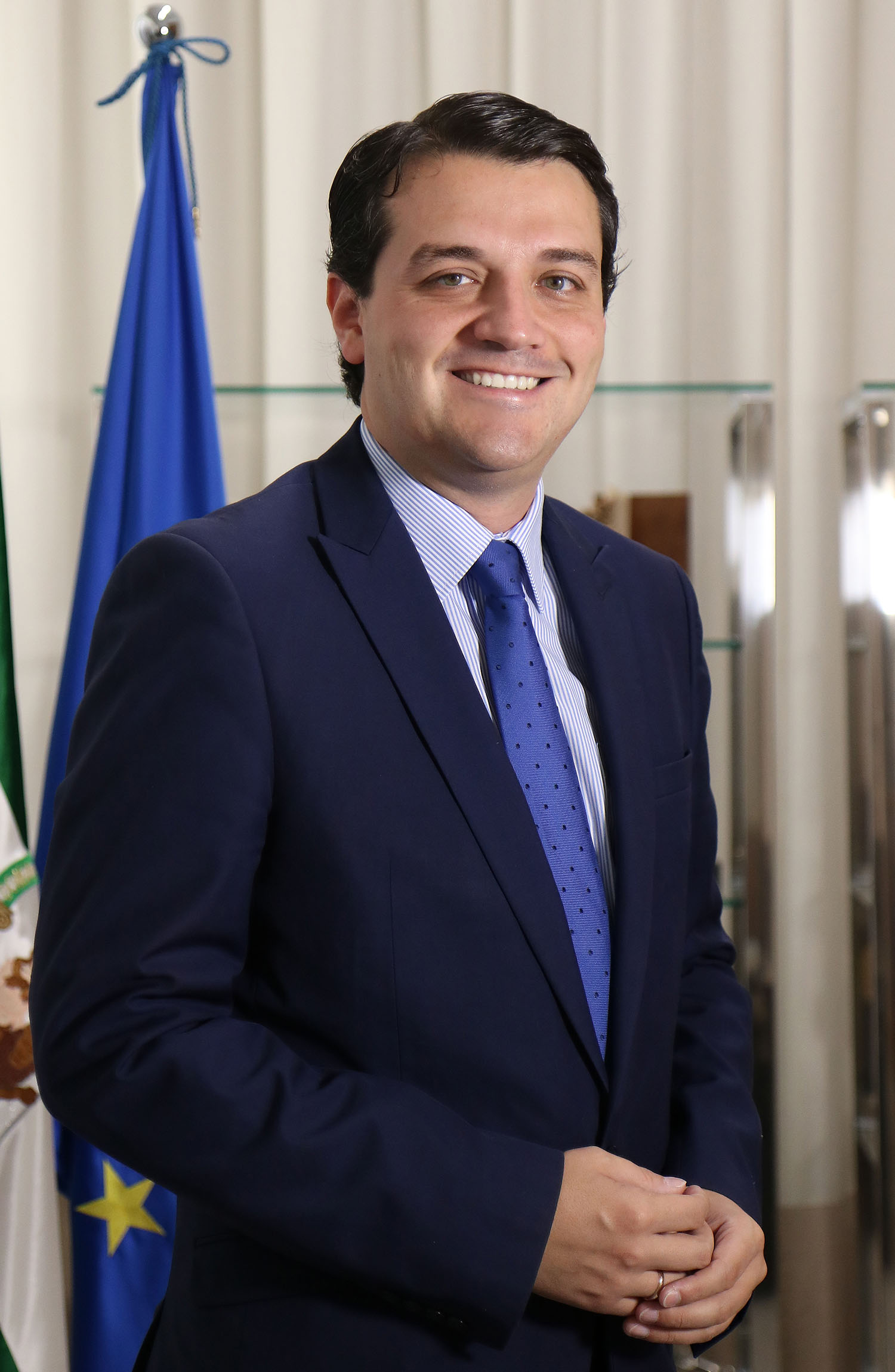

José María Bellido Roche (born 15 September 1977) is a Spanish People's Party (PP) politician who is a city councillor (2004–) and the mayor (2019–) of Córdoba.

== Biography ==
=== Early life and career ===
Bellido was born in the Vallellano neighbourhood of Córdoba, Andalusia and gained his interest in local politics from his father, who was a secretary at the city hall in Almodóvar del Río. He graduated in law from the University of Córdoba and obtained a master's degree in Human Resources Management at ESIC University in Seville.

In 1996, he joined the New Generations of the People's Party. He was first a candidate for the city council in 1999, 18th on the party's list. In 2004, he was elected. When the PP obtained the mayoralty with José Antonio Nieto, Bellido was put in charge of the treasury and administration. After Nieto lost the 2015 election to Isabel Ambrosio of the Spanish Socialist Workers' Party (PSOE), Bellido became the party's spokesman in the city hall and in 2018 was named the mayoral candidate for the following year.

=== Mayor of Córdoba ===
In June 2019, Bellido was invested as mayor of Córdoba after all councillors of the PP and Citizens voted in his favour, and Vox abstained. Within his first month in office, he closed down a commission initiated by his predecessor, which had claimed that the city's Mosque–Cathedral was public property and not the property of the Catholic Church. He then sought to normalise relations between the local government and the church. In August 2020, following the reconversion of Istanbul's Hagia Sophia into a mosque, Sultan bin Muhammad Al-Qasimi of Sharjah called for the Córdoba building to go through the same process. Bellido replied that "As mayor, I intend to defend our city, and if people come from outside telling us what to do, they are going to have the door closed in their faces".

In March 2020, Bellido reversed the name changes of two local streets by Ambrosio, who had cited the Law of Historical Memory. The two streets bore the names of José Cruz Conde and Fernando Suárez de Tangil, two members of the Dictatorship of Primo de Rivera, the latter of whom also served Francisco Franco.
