= Rafael Merino =

Spanish politician

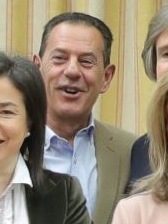

Rafael Merino López (born 8 January 1959) is a Spanish former politician of the People's Party. He was a member of the city council in Córdoba from 1991 to 2004, serving as mayor from 1995 to 1999. He was a member of the Congress of Deputies from 2000 to 2002 and again from 2004 to 2019.

== Biography ==
=== Early years and mayor of Córdoba ===
Born in Córdoba in Andalusia, Merino graduated in law from the University of Córdoba. He began in politics in 1981, joining the New Generations (NNGG).

In the 1987 Spanish local elections, Merino ran as 14th on the list of the People's Alliance (AP), the precursor of the People's Party (PP). He was unelected as they took seven seats on the council. Four years later, he ran second on the PP list and was elected; the list was led by Rafael Campanero, whom Merino saw as an influence for his ability to collaborate with others.

Merino led the PP list in 1995, winning a plurality of seats, and was invested as mayor after the ruling United Left (IU) failed to form a pact with the Spanish Socialist Workers' Party (PSOE). Merino was the first mayor of Córdoba from outside of the IU or its main organisation the Communist Party of Spain (PCE) since the first democratic elections in 1979, and this would not be repeated until José Antonio Nieto won a PP majority in 2011. Merino took 14 of 29 seats in the 1999 election, but the IU and PSOE were able to pact after winning the remainder, and installed Rosa Aguilar as mayor.

Merino reflected in 2024 that his period as mayor was difficult due to the financial problems in the council. He recalled two tragedies: the assassination of a sergeant by ETA in May 1996 and the murder of two women police officers by bank robbers that December.

=== Congress of Deputies ===
Merino was a member of the Congress of Deputies for the majority of the period 2000 to 2019, though he briefly left that office to concentrate on a failed run to return to the Córdoba mayor's office in 2003.

While in the Congress of Deputies, Merino was a co-spokesman of the Committee on Public Administration, along with Pedro Sánchez of the PSOE, who later became prime minister of Spain. Merino reflected in 2024 that he had a good relationship with Sánchez but that the latter had "evolved a lot and not for good reasons".

In December 2014, Merino and PP congressional spokesman Rafael Hernando Fraile were sentenced to pay €20,000 to the party Union, Progress and Democracy for accusing it of being funded illegally.

From the 2015 Spanish general election, Merino's position as the PP's lead candidate in the Córdoba constituency was taken by Nieto, his successor as PP mayor of Córdoba.

=== Later years ===
In February 2019, Merino was named as director of the Public Ports Agency of Andalusia. He was named by the new PP Regional Government of Andalusia, led by Juanma Moreno since the 2018 Andalusian regional election.

Merino retired from politics in June 2024, aged 65. He said that the state of Spanish politics was too tense and that it was overflowing into civil society; he called for more cooperation in the spirit of the Spanish transition to democracy.
