= 1996 Andalusian regional election =

Election in the Spanish region of Andalusia

- 3 March 1996

All 109 seats in the Parliament of Andalusia 55 seats needed for a majority
- Opinion polls
- Registered: 5,577,567 ▲3.5%
- Turnout: 4,347,193 (77.9%) ▲10.6 pp
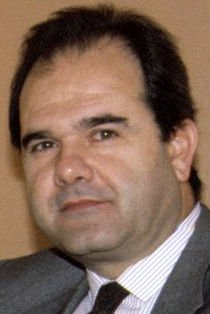

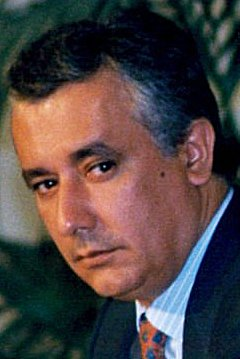

	First party	Second party	Third party
Leader	Manuel Chaves	Javier Arenas	Luis Carlos Rejón
Party	PSOE–A	PP	IULV–CA
Leader since	19 April 1990	25 July 1993	21 July 1988
Leader's seat	Cádiz	Seville	Córdoba
Last election	45 seats, 38.7%	41 seats, 34.4%	20 seats, 19.1%
Seats won	52	40	13
Seat change	▲7	▼1	▼7
Popular vote	1,903,160	1,466,980	603,495
Percentage	44.1%	34.0%	14.0%
Swing	▲5.4 pp	▼0.4 pp	▼5.1 pp
	Fourth party
Leader	Pedro Pacheco
Party	PA
Leader since	1994
Leader's seat	Cádiz
Last election	3 seats, 5.8% (Note: Results for PA–PAP in the 1994 election.)
Seats won	4
Seat change	▲1
Popular vote	287,764
Percentage	6.7%
Swing	▲0.9 pp
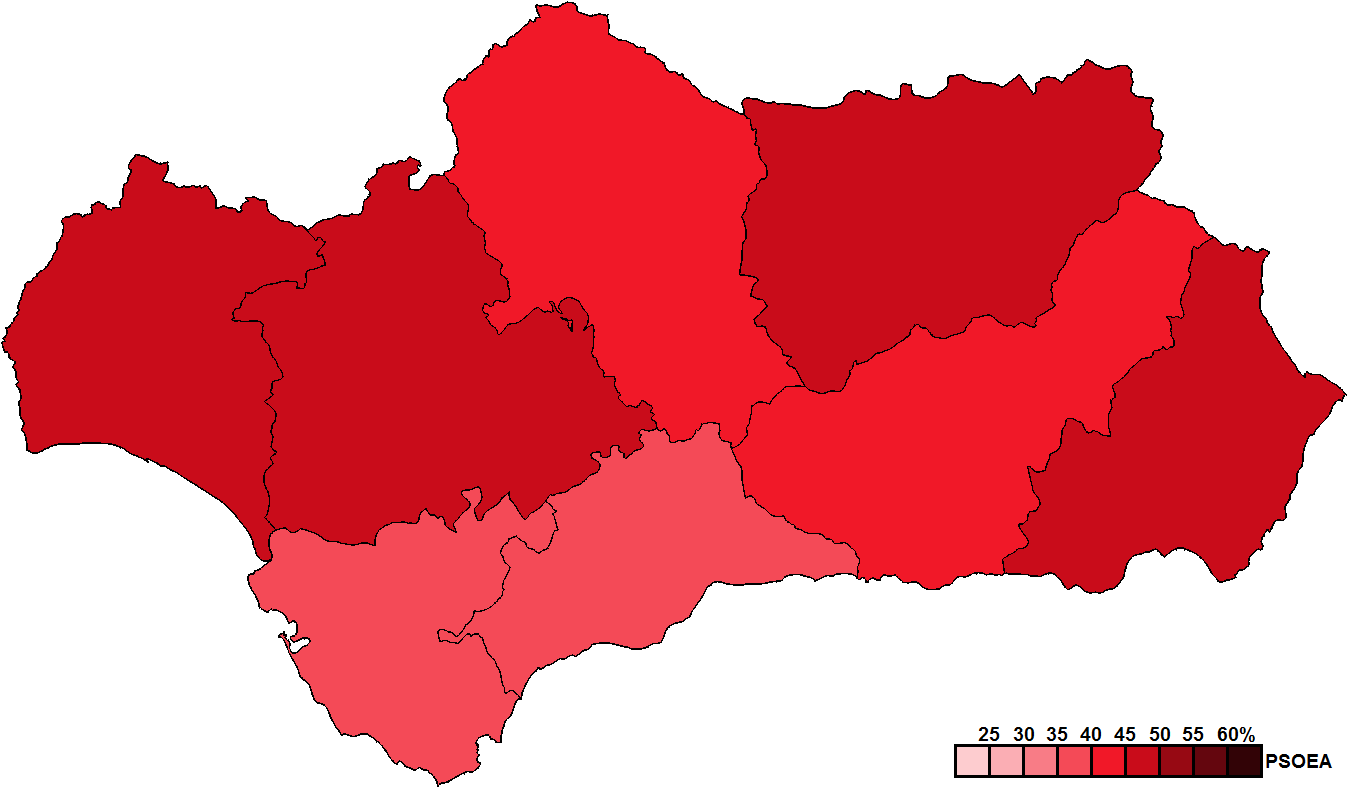
- Constituency results map for the Parliament of Andalusia
President before election
Manuel Chaves
PSOE–A
President after election
Manuel Chaves
PSOE–A

A regional election was held in Andalusia on 3 March 1996 to elect the 5th Parliament of the autonomous community. All 109 seats in the Parliament were up for election. It was held concurrently with the 1996 Spanish general election.

The 1994 election had resulted in a hung parliament. Manuel Chaves had formed a minority government of the Spanish Socialist Workers' Party of Andalusia (PSOE–A), but was forced to dissolve the Parliament and call a snap election for March 1996 after barely twenty months into his term, as a result of the conservative People's Party (PP) and left-wing United Left (IULV–CA) joining into an unofficial alliance (dubbed as la pinza, Spanish for "the clamp") to block the Chaves government's parliamentary action. Scandals rocking Felipe González's national government and favourable opinion polls were among the reasons that led the two parties to team up to bring down the PSOE regional government.

Despite opinion polls predicting a likely PSOE defeat, the election result was a major upset: the PSOE gained over 500,000 votes and 7 seats compared to the previous election and won a resounding victory as the PP stagnated and the IU vote collapsed. At 77.9%, turnout was the highest ever registered for a regional election in Andalusia. This result allowed Chaves to form a coalition government with the Andalusian Party (PA), ending the period of political turmoil that had dominated the previous legislature.

== Overview ==
Under the 1981 Statute of Autonomy, the Parliament of Andalusia was the unicameral legislature of the homonymous autonomous community, having legislative power in devolved matters, as well as the ability to grant or withdraw confidence from a regional president. The electoral and procedural rules were supplemented by national law provisions.

=== Date ===
The term of the Parliament of Andalusia expired four years after the date of its previous election, unless it was dissolved earlier. The election decree was required to be issued no later than 25 days before the scheduled expiration date of parliament and published on the following day in the Official Gazette of the Regional Government of Andalusia (BOJA), with election day taking place 54 days after the decree's publication (barring any date within from 1 July to 31 August). The previous election was held on 12 June 1994, which meant that the chamber's term would have expired on 12 June 1998. Due to the ban on summer elections, the election decree was required to be published in the BOJA no later than 7 May 1998, setting the latest legal possible date for election day on 30 June 1998.

The regional president had the prerogative to dissolve the Parliament of Andalusia at any given time and call a snap election, provided that no motion of no confidence was in process and that dissolution did not occur before one year after a previous one.

The Parliament of Andalusia was officially dissolved on 9 January 1996 with the publication of the corresponding decree in the BOJA, setting election day for 3 March and scheduling for the chamber to reconvene on 29 March.

=== Electoral system ===
Voting for the Parliament was based on universal suffrage, comprising all Spanish nationals over 18 years of age, registered in Andalusia and with full political rights, provided that they had not been deprived of the right to vote by a final sentence, nor were legally incapacitated.

The Parliament of Andalusia had a minimum of 90 and a maximum of 110 seats, with electoral provisions fixing its size at 109. All were elected in eight multi-member constituencies—corresponding to the provinces of Almería, Cádiz, Córdoba, Granada, Huelva, Jaén, Málaga and Seville, each of which was assigned an initial minimum of eight seats and the remaining 45 distributed in proportion to population (with the number of seats in each province not exceeding two times that of any other)—using the D'Hondt method and closed-list proportional voting, with a three percent-threshold of valid votes (including blank ballots) in each constituency. The use of this electoral method resulted in a higher effective threshold depending on district magnitude and vote distribution.

As a result of the aforementioned allocation, each Parliament constituency was entitled the following seats:

Seats	Constituencies
19	Seville^{(+1)}
15	Cádiz, Málaga^{(−1)}
13	Córdoba, Granada
12	Jaén
11	Almería, Huelva

The law did not provide for by-elections to fill vacant seats; instead, any vacancies arising after the proclamation of candidates and during the legislative term were filled by the next candidates on the party lists or, when required, by designated substitutes.

=== Outgoing parliament ===
The table below shows the composition of the parliamentary groups in the chamber at the time of dissolution.

Parliamentary composition in January 1996
Groups	Parties	Legislators	
Groups	Parties	Seats	Total
Socialist Parliamentary Group	PSOE–A	45	45
Andalusian People's Parliamentary Group	PP	41	41
United Left/The Greens Parliamentary Group	IULV–CA	20	20
Andalusian Parliamentary Group	PA	3	3

== Parties and candidates ==
The electoral law allowed for parties and federations registered in the interior ministry, alliances and groupings of electors to present lists of candidates. Parties and federations intending to form an alliance were required to inform the relevant electoral commission within 10 days of the election call, whereas groupings of electors needed to secure the signature of at least one percent of the electorate in the constituencies for which they sought election, disallowing electors from signing for more than one list.

Below is a list of the main parties and alliances which contested the election:

Candidacy	Parties and alliances	Leading candidate	Ideology	Previous result		Gov.	Ref.
Candidacy	Parties and alliances	Leading candidate	Ideology	Vote %	Seats	Gov.	Ref.
PSOE–A	List: Spanish Socialist Workers' Party of Andalusia (PSOE–A)	Manuel Chaves	Social democracy	38.7%	45	Yes	
PP	List: People's Party (PP)	Javier Arenas	Conservatism; Christian democracy	34.4%	41	No	
IULV–CA	List: United Left/The Greens–Assembly for Andalusia (IULV–CA) – Communist Party of Andalusia (PCA) – Socialist Action Party (PASOC) – Republican Left (IR) – Collectives for the Unity of Workers (CUT)	Luis Carlos Rejón	Socialism; Communism	19.1%	20	No	
PA	List: Andalusian Party (PA)	Pedro Pacheco	Andalusian nationalism Social democracy	5.8%	3	No	

== Campaign ==
=== Debates ===
1996 Andalusian regional election debates
Date	Organizer(s)	Moderator(s)	P Present (Note: Denotes a main invitee attending the event.) S Surrogate (Note: Denotes a main invitee not attending the event, sending a surrogate in their place.) NI Not invited I Invited A Absent invitee					
Date	Organizer(s)	Moderator(s)	PSOE–A	PP	IULV–CA	PA	Audience	Ref.
28 February	Cadena SER	Iñaki Gabilondo	P Chaves	P Arenas	NI	NI	—	
29 February	Canal Sur	Rafael Rodríguez	P Chaves	P Arenas	P Rejón	P Pacheco	26.5% (454,000)	

== Opinion polls ==
The tables below list opinion polling results in reverse chronological order, showing the most recent first and using the dates when the survey fieldwork was done, as opposed to the date of publication. Where the fieldwork dates are unknown, the date of publication is given instead. The highest percentage figure in each polling survey is displayed with its background shaded in the leading party's colour. If a tie ensues, this is applied to the figures with the highest percentages. The "Lead" column on the right shows the percentage-point difference between the parties with the highest percentages in a poll.

=== Voting intention estimates ===
The table below lists weighted voting intention estimates. Refusals are generally excluded from the party vote percentages, while question wording and the treatment of "don't know" responses and those not intending to vote may vary between polling organisations. When available, seat projections determined by the polling organisations are displayed below (or in place of) the percentages in a smaller font; 55 seats were required for an absolute majority in the Parliament of Andalusia.

Polling firm/Commissioner	Fieldwork date	Sample size	Turnout	PSOE–A	PP	IULV	PA	Lead
1996 regional election	3 Mar 1996	—N/a	78.1	44.1; 52	34.0; 40	14.0; 13	6.7; 4	10.1
Demoscopia/El País	16–21 Feb 1996	?	80	33.3; 39/42	39.7; 47/49	18.3; 16/18	7.5; 3/6	6.4
CIS (Note: "Distribuciones de frecuencia marginales del Estudio 2207 (Andalucía)". CIS (in Spanish). 21 February 1996. Archived from the original on 2 April 2015.)	12–21 Feb 1996	2,497	76.5	35.1	38.4	18.7	7.4	3.3
Sigma Dos–Vox Pública/El Mundo	15–20 Feb 1996	2,200	?	32.5; 36/39	37.9; 43/48	18.7; 19/22	8.5; 5/8	5.4
Vox Pública/El Periódico	11–16 Feb 1996	2,000	?	34.9; 38/42	40.2; 44/49	17.7; 16/20	6.0; 1/4	5.3
Metra Seis/Colpisa	10–15 Feb 1996	1,617	?	34.0– 36.0; 41/43	39.0– 40.0; 45/49	14.0– 16.0; 14/17	7.0– 9.0; 4/8	4.0– 5.0
Demoscopia/El País	10 Feb 1996	?	80	35.7; 42/43	39.3; 45/48	17.4; 16/18	? 3	3.6
Sigma Dos–Vox Pública/El Mundo	21–25 Jan 1996	2,200	?	32.7; 36/40	39.4; 45/49	18.0; 17/20	8.2; 4/7	6.7
Sigma Dos/PP	3–10 Dec 1995	?	?	37.4; 41/44	38.7; 44/48	19.4; 17/23	2.5; 0/1	1.3
PSOE	9 Dec 1995	2,400	?	38.0	34.0	18.0	5.0	4.0
PSOE	27 Nov 1995	?	?	? 38	? 46	? 24/25	? 0/1	?
PSOE	23 Nov 1995	?	?	? 39/41	? 46/47	? 20/21	–	?
CIS (Note: "Situación social y política en Andalucía. Elecciones Autonómicas. Octubre-noviembre 1995 (Estudio nº 2196)". CIS (in Spanish). 18 October 1995. Archived from the original on 26 June 2018.)	27 Oct–5 Nov 1995	2,498	72.8	34.5; 40	37.4; 45/47	21.6; 23/24	5.9; 1/2	2.9
1994 regional election	12 Jun 1994	—N/a	67.3	38.7; 45	34.4; 41	19.1; 20	5.8 (Note: Result for Andalusian Coalition–Andalusian Power.); 3	4.3

=== Voting preferences ===
The table below lists raw, unweighted voting preferences.

Polling firm/Commissioner	Fieldwork date	Sample size	PSOE–A	PP	IULV	PA	Question	X mark	Lead
1996 regional election (Note: Does not include non-resident citizens.)	3 Mar 1996	—N/a	33.8	26.2	10.8	5.1	—N/a	21.7	7.6
CIS	12–21 Feb 1996	2,497	28.8	22.2	12.4	5.2	25.2	4.2	6.6
CIS	27 Oct–5 Nov 1995	2,498	25.5	20.8	14.0	3.1	27.5	7.0	4.7
CIS	18 Feb–2 Mar 1995	1,999	27.2	19.0	15.3	3.0	25.3	8.0	8.2
1994 regional election	12 Jun 1994	—N/a	25.9	23.2	12.9	3.9	—N/a	32.3	2.7

=== Victory preferences ===
The table below lists opinion polling on the victory preferences for each party in the event of a regional election taking place.

Polling firm/Commissioner	Fieldwork date	Sample size	PSOE–A	PP	Question	X mark	Lead
CIS	12–21 Feb 1996	2,497	41.4	27.3	12.8	18.6	14.1

=== Victory likelihood ===
The table below lists opinion polling on the perceived likelihood of victory for each party in the event of a regional election taking place.

Polling firm/Commissioner	Fieldwork date	Sample size	PSOE–A	PP	Question	X mark	Lead
CIS	12–21 Feb 1996	2,497	21.3	35.7	19.1	23.9	14.4

== Results ==
=== Overall ===
← Summary of the 3 March 1996 Parliament of Andalusia election results →
Parties and alliances	Popular vote			Seats	
Parties and alliances	Votes	%	±pp	Total	+/−
Spanish Socialist Workers' Party of Andalusia (PSOE–A)	1,903,160	44.05	+5.33	52	+7
People's Party (PP)	1,466,980	33.96	−0.40	40	−1
United Left/The Greens–Assembly for Andalusia (IULV–CA)	603,495	13.97	−5.17	13	−7
Andalusian Party (PA)^{1}	287,764	6.66	+0.86	4	+1
Communist Party of the Andalusian People (PCPA)	7,340	0.17	−0.17	0	±0
Andalusian Nation (NA)	5,846	0.14	−0.13	0	±0
Humanist Party (PH)	4,339	0.10	−0.05	0	±0
Authentic Spanish Phalanx (FEA)	3,869	0.09	New	0	±0
Centrist Union (UC)	1,688	0.04	−0.23	0	±0
Democratic Andalusian Unity (UAD)	1,486	0.03	New	0	±0
Voice of the Andalusian People (VDPA)	840	0.02	New	0	±0
Blank ballots	33,165	0.77	−0.08		
Total	4,319,972			109	±0
Valid votes	4,319,972	99.37	−0.03		
Invalid votes	27,221	0.63	+0.03		
Votes cast / turnout	4,347,193	77.94	+10.67		
Abstentions	1,230,374	22.06	−10.67		
Registered voters	5,577,567				
Sources
Footnotes: ^{1} Andalusian Party results are compared to Andalusian Coalition–Andalusian Power totals in the 1994 election.

Popular vote
PSOE–A	44.05%
PP	33.96%
IULV–CA	13.97%
PA	6.66%
Others	0.59%
Blank ballots	0.77%

Seats
PSOE–A	47.70%
PP	36.70%
IULV–CA	11.93%
PA	3.67%

=== Distribution by constituency ===
Constituency	PSOE–A		PP		IULV–CA		PA	
Constituency	%	S	%	S	%	S	%	S
Almería	45.6	5	39.7	5	10.3	1	3.3	−
Cádiz	39.5	6	32.5	5	12.8	2	13.8	2
Córdoba	41.7	6	31.6	4	19.7	3	5.7	−
Granada	44.9	7	37.5	5	12.4	1	3.9	−
Huelva	49.2	6	32.8	4	11.5	1	5.3	−
Jaén	47.3	6	36.2	5	12.2	1	3.3	−
Málaga	39.6	6	37.3	6	15.8	2	5.7	1
Seville	47.4	10	29.7	6	13.9	2	7.5	1
Total	44.1	52	34.0	40	14.0	13	6.7	4

== Aftermath ==
=== Government formation ===
Investiture; Nomination of Manuel Chaves (PSOE–A)
Ballot →	11 April 1996
Required majority →	55 out of 109
Yes: • PSOE–A (52); • PA (4)	56 / 109
No: • PP (40); • IULV–CA (13)	53 / 109
Abstentions	0 / 109
Absentees	0 / 109

== Bibliography ==
- Ley Orgánica 6/1981, de 30 de diciembre, de Estatuto de Autonomía para Andalucía (Organic Law 6/1981). Official State Gazette (in Spanish). 30 December 1981. BOE-A-1982-633.
- Ley 6/1983, de 21 de julio, del Gobierno y la Administración de la Comunidad Autónoma (Law 6/1983). Official State Gazette (in Spanish). 21 July 1983. BOE-A-1983-23960.
- Ley Orgánica 5/1985, de 19 de junio, del Régimen Electoral General (Organic Law 5/1985). Official State Gazette (in Spanish). 19 June 1985 [version as of 24 November 1995]. BOE-A-1985-11672.
- Ley 1/1986, de 2 de enero, Electoral de Andalucía (Law 1/1986). Official State Gazette (in Spanish). 2 January 1986 [version as of 25 May 1994]. BOE-A-1986-2788.
- Ley 6/1994, de 18 de mayo, de Modificación de la Ley 6/1983, de 21 de julio, del Gobierno y la Administración de la Comunidad Autónoma, y la Ley 1/1986, de 2 de enero, Electoral de Andalucía (Law 6/1994). Official State Gazette (in Spanish). 18 May 1994. BOE-A-1994-14602.
- Decreto del Presidente 1/1996, de 8 de enero, de disolución del Parlamento de Andalucía y de convocatoria de elecciones (PDF) (Decree 1/1996). Official Gazette of the Regional Government of Andalusia (in Spanish). 8 January 1996.
