= Rosa Aguilar =

Spanish politician (born 1957)

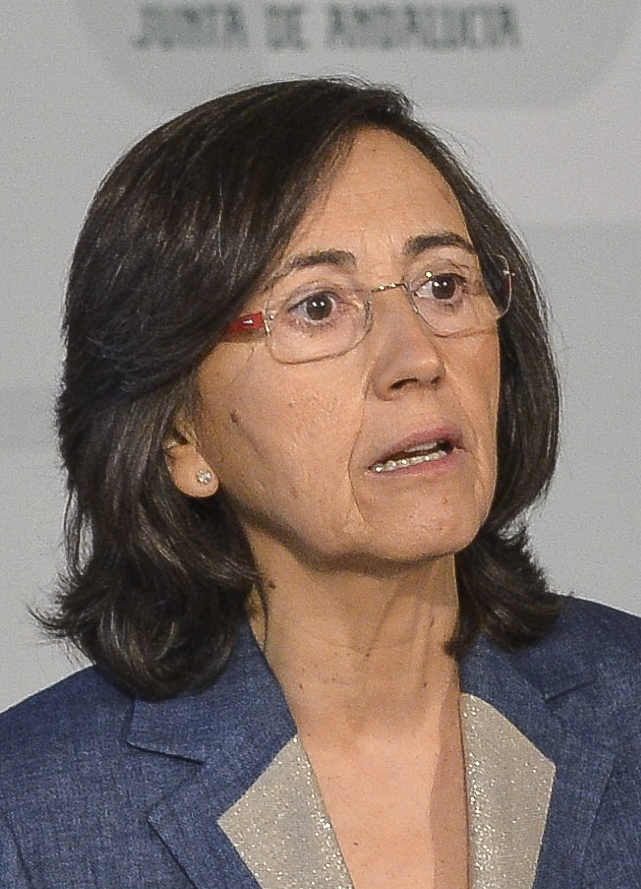
- Rosa Aguilar in 2015

Minister of Rural and Marine Environment
- In office 21 October 2010 – 22 December 2011
- Prime Minister: José Luis Zapatero
- Preceded by: Elena Espinosa
- Succeeded by: Miguel Arias Cañete

Mayor of Córdoba
- In office 4 July 1999 – 23 April 2009
- Preceded by: Rafael Merino
- Succeeded by: Andrés Ocaña

Personal details
- Born: 7 July 1957 (age 68) Córdoba, Andalusia, Spain

Rosa Aguilar Rivera (born 7 July 1957) is a Spanish politician who was the Minister of Rural and Marine Environment between 2010 and 2012. She is a member of the Spanish Socialist Workers' Party. She also was the mayor of Córdoba between 1999 and 2009. She was shortlisted for the 2008 World Mayor award.

Aguilar joined the Communist Party of Spain (PCE) and followed the party into the coalition United Left (IU) in 1986. In 1987 she was elected to Córdoba City Council for IU, remaining a councillor until 1991. She was a deputy in the Parliament of Andalusia between 1990 and 1993. In the latter year she was elected to the Spanish Congress of Deputies for Cordoba Province and held the seat in the 1996 General Election. She did not stand at the 2000 election.

Following poor election results for IU at the 2008 general election, she was mentioned as a possible successor to Gaspar Llamazares as IU leader, though in the event Cayo Lara became leader. Her membership of IU came to an end in April 2009 when she was expelled from IU after she had accepted an offer to become Minister for Public works in the Andalusian regional government.
