= Isabel Ambrosio =

Spanish politician (born 1970)

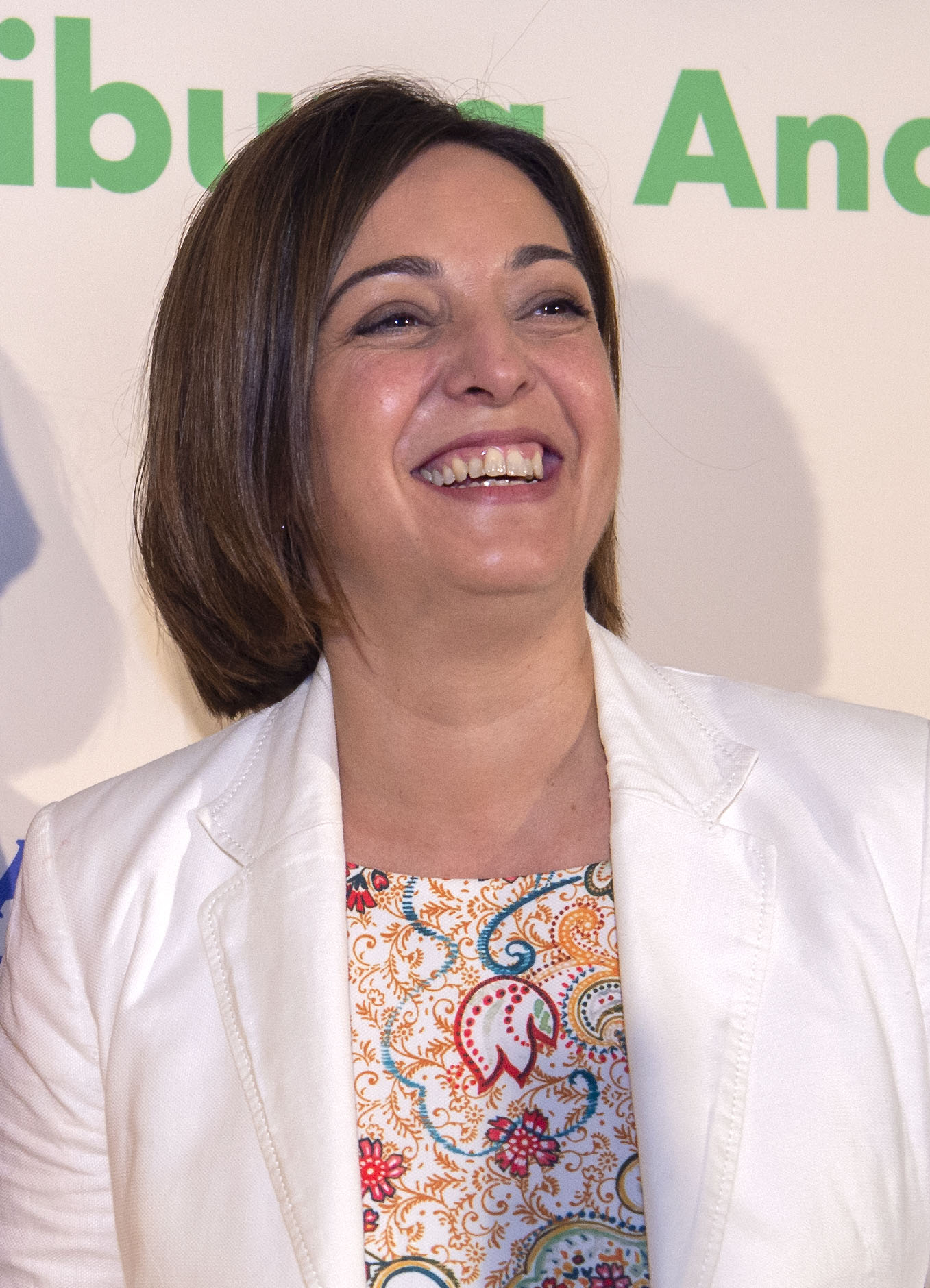

María Isabel Ambrosio Palos (born 18 July 1970) is a Spanish Socialist Workers' Party (PSOE) politician who was the mayor of Córdoba from 2015 to 2019.

== Biography ==
Born in Madrid and raised in Córdoba, Ambrosio began working at the age of 10 when her father died, as she was the eldest of four siblings. She graduated from the Workers' University of Córdoba, and joined the PSOE's youth organisation in 1991. She was in the Parliament of Andalusia from 2004 to 2008, when she resigned to become the government's delegate in Córdoba.

In October 2014, Ambrosio was chosen as the PSOE's mayoral candidate in Córdoba for the next year's elections. The following June, she was elected to the city council and installed as mayor with an absolute majority of 15 seats: seven from her party, four from coalition partners United Left and four from opposition party Ganemos Córdoba. Her first act as mayor was to leave roses at the tomb of Manuel Sánchez-Badajoz, the socialist former mayor of the city who was executed in 1936 at the start of the Spanish Civil War.

As mayor, Ambrosio proposed that the Mosque–Cathedral of Córdoba, a building of which most of its architecture is of a mosque but has been used exclusively as a cathedral since 1236, be made public property. She cited the example of the Alhambra palace in nearby Granada for the financial benefits to the city. Ambrosio brought together a committee of legal and historical experts who concluded that the building was never relinquished by the Spanish crown, and therefore the state. Opponents pointed to the presence of PSOE politician Carmen Calvo in the committee, and accused the party of anticlericalism. Ambrosio's conservative successor, José María Bellido, shut down the commission and sought to repair relations with the church.

Citing the Law of Historical Memory, Ambrosio renamed two main streets in Córdoba that bore names of figures from the Dictatorship of Primo de Rivera, one of whom also served under Francisco Franco. These names were reverted by Bellido.
