= Ramón Fernández-Pacheco =

Spanish politician (born 1983)

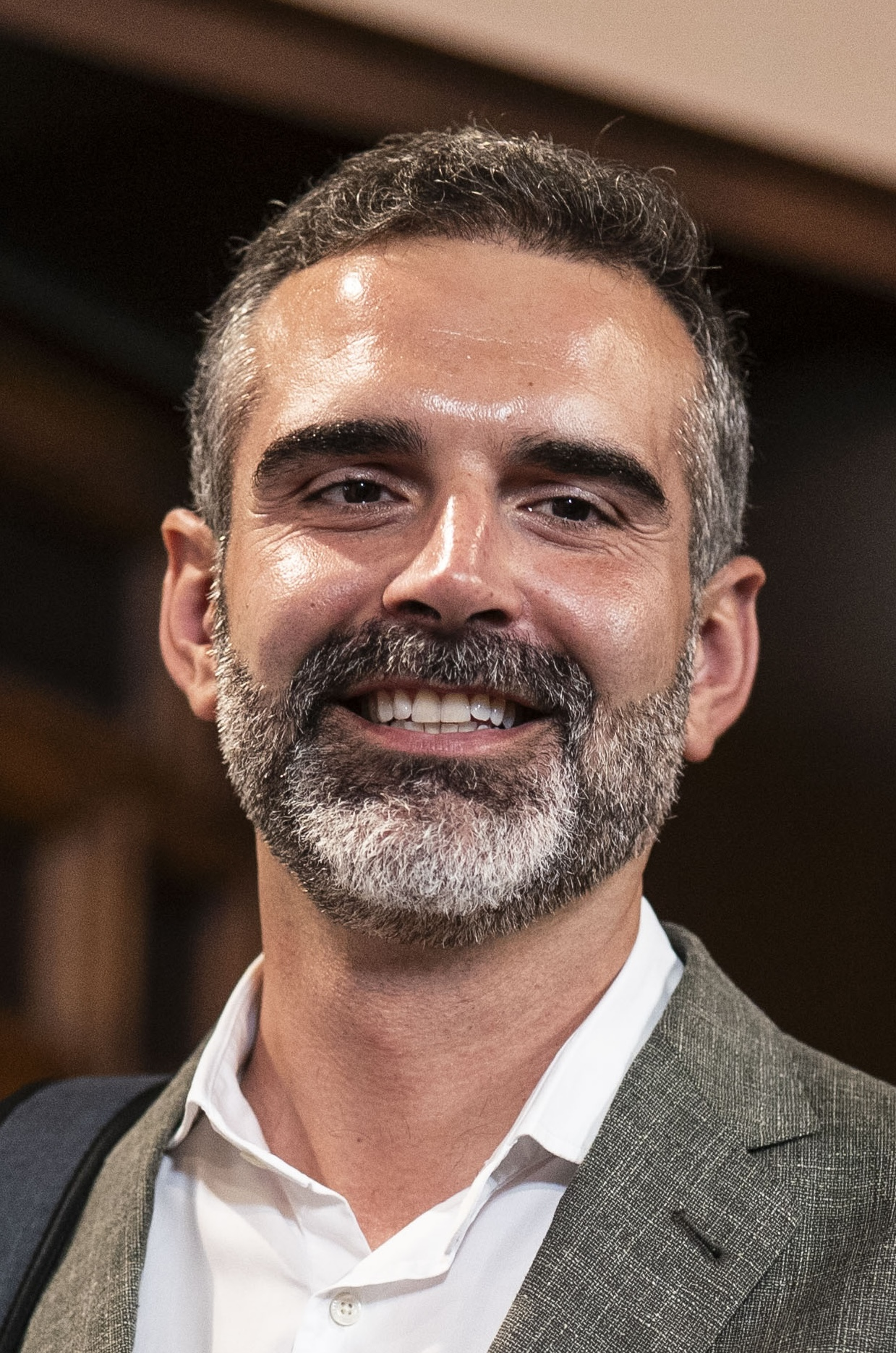
- Fernández-Pacheco in 2025

Minister of Agriculture, Fisheries, Water and Rural Development of Andalusia
- Incumbent
- Assumed office 4 May 2024
- President: Juanma Moreno
- Preceded by: Carmen Crespo

Personal details
- Born: 17 September 1983 (age 42)
- Party: People's Party

Ramón Fernández-Pacheco Monterreal (born 17 September 1983) is a Spanish politician serving as minister of agriculture, fisheries, water and rural development of Andalusia since 2024. From 2022 to 2024, he served as minister of sustainability, environment and blue economy, and as government spokesperson. From 2015 to 2022, he served as mayor of Almería.
