= Andrés Ocaña =

Spanish politician (1955–2017)

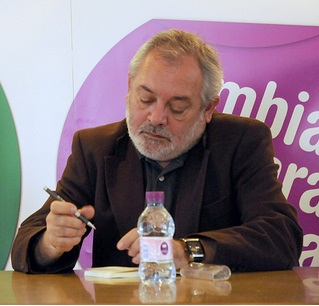
- Andrés Ocaña in 2011

Mayor of Córdoba
- In office 8 May 2009 – 11 June 2011
- Preceded by: Rosa Aguilar
- Succeeded by: José Antonio Nieto

Córdoba City Councillor
- In office 23 June 1995 – 11 June 2011

Personal details
- Born: 26 April 1955 Aguilar de la Frontera, Spain
- Died: 2 March 2017 (aged 61) Córdoba, Spain
- Party: United Left/The Greens–Assembly for Andalusia

Andrés Ocaña Rabadán (26 April 1955 – 2 March 2017) was a Spanish politician and academic who served as the mayor of Córdoba from 2009 to 2011.

Ocaña was born in the town of Aguilar de la Frontera in the Province of Córdoba in 1955. He served as a member of the Córdoba city council from 1995 until 2011 during the rule of the governing United Left/The Greens–Assembly for Andalusia (IU).

In 2009, Córdoba mayor Rosa Aguilar resigned from office when she was appointed counselor of the government of Andalusia. Ocaña succeeded Aguilar as the city's mayor. Ocaña served as Mayor from 2009 until 2011, when the opposition People's Party (PP) won an absolute majority in the Córdoba city council in the 2011 municipal elections.

Ocaña died of a myocardial infarction on 2 March 2017, at the age of 62.
