= Antonio Romero (politician) =

Spanish politician (1955–2024)

Antonio Romero Ruiz (1955 – 29 November 2024) was a Spanish United Left politician who served as a Deputy and a Senator. He died on 29 November 2024, at the age of 69.
