= Carmen Crespo =

Spanish politician

María del Carmen Crespo Díaz
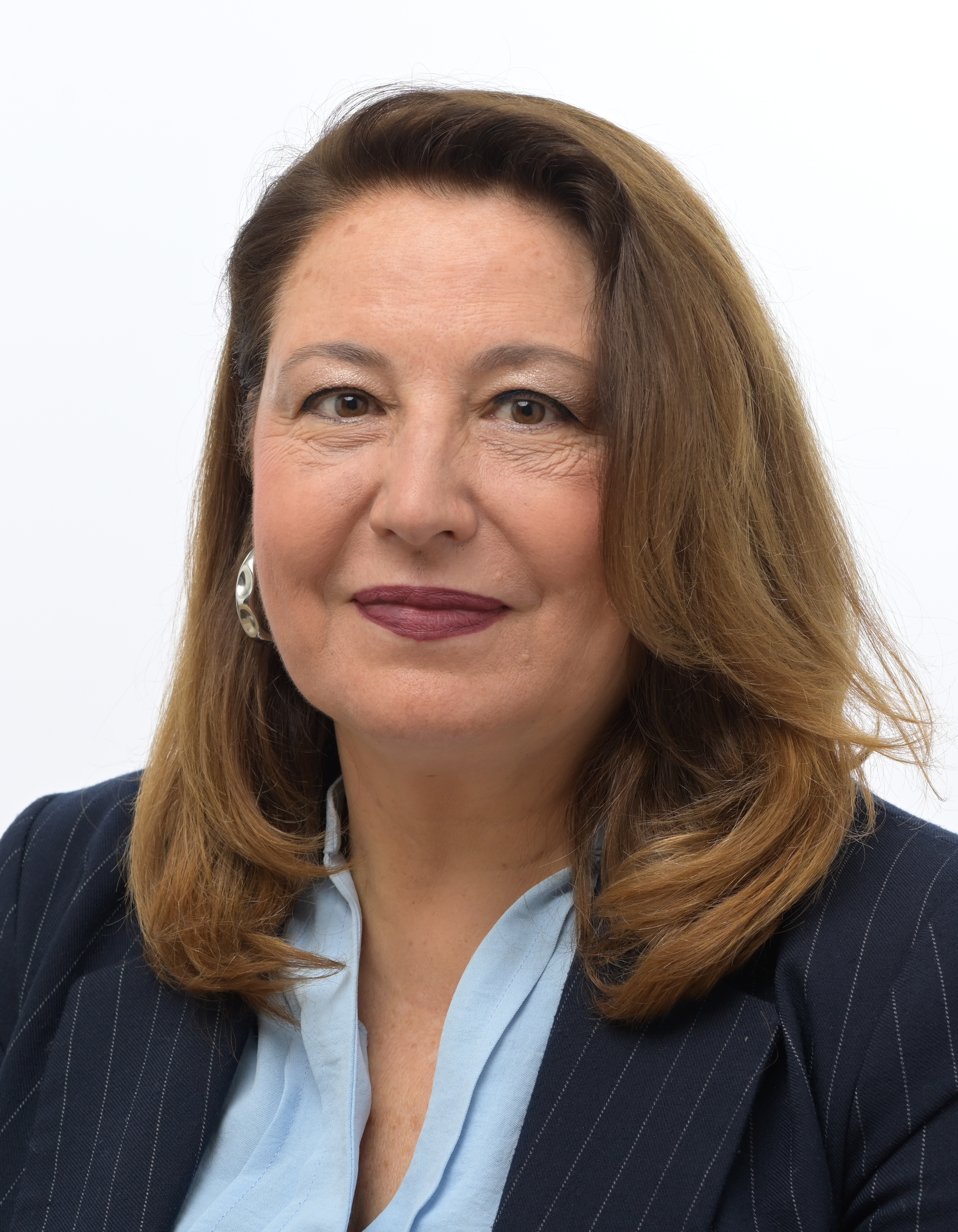
- Born: María del Carmen Crespo Díaz; Spain
- Occupation: Politician
- Known for: Social Action Coordinator of PP in Andalusia
- Office: Mayor of Adra (since 2003)
- Political party: Partido Popular (PP)

María del Carmen Crespo Díaz (Spanish pronunciation: [kaɾˈmeŋ ˈkɾespo]) is a Spanish politician, belonging to Partido Popular (PP). She joined PP in 1990, and became Social Action Coordinator of the party in Andalusia. Since 1998 she has been a deputy in the Andalusian parliament, and since 2003 she has been the mayor of Adra municipality, Almería province.
