= Loles López =

Spanish politician (born 1977)

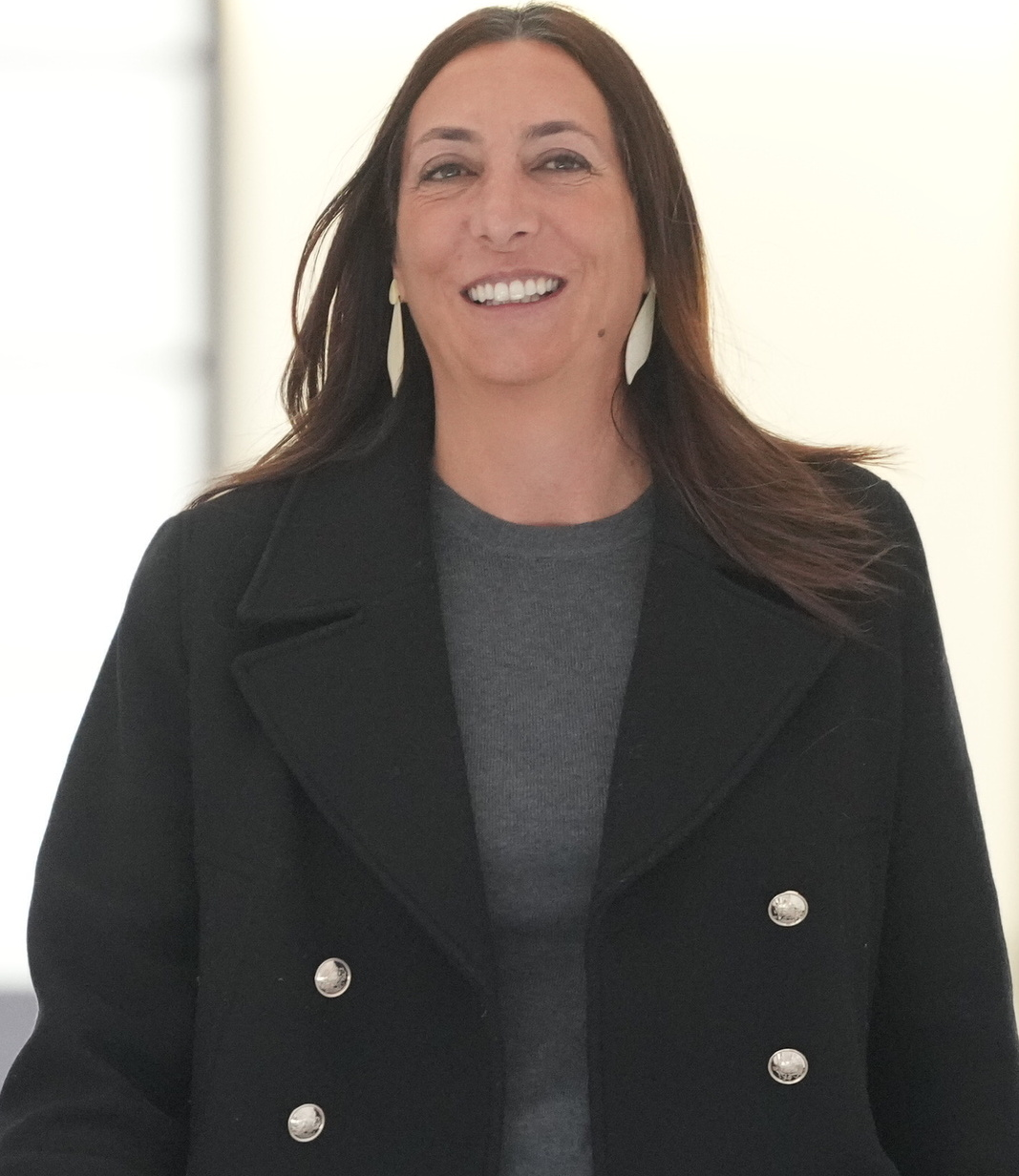
- López in 2025

Member of the Senate
- In office 13 January 2016 – 31 December 2018
- Constituency: Huelva

Personal details
- Born: 18 March 1977 (age 49)
- Party: People's Party (since 2002)

María Dolores López Gabarro (born 18 March 1977) is a Spanish politician serving as minister of social integration, youth, families and equality of Andalusia since 2022. From 2016 to 2018, she was a member of the Senate.
