= Carolina España =

Spanish politician (born 1969)

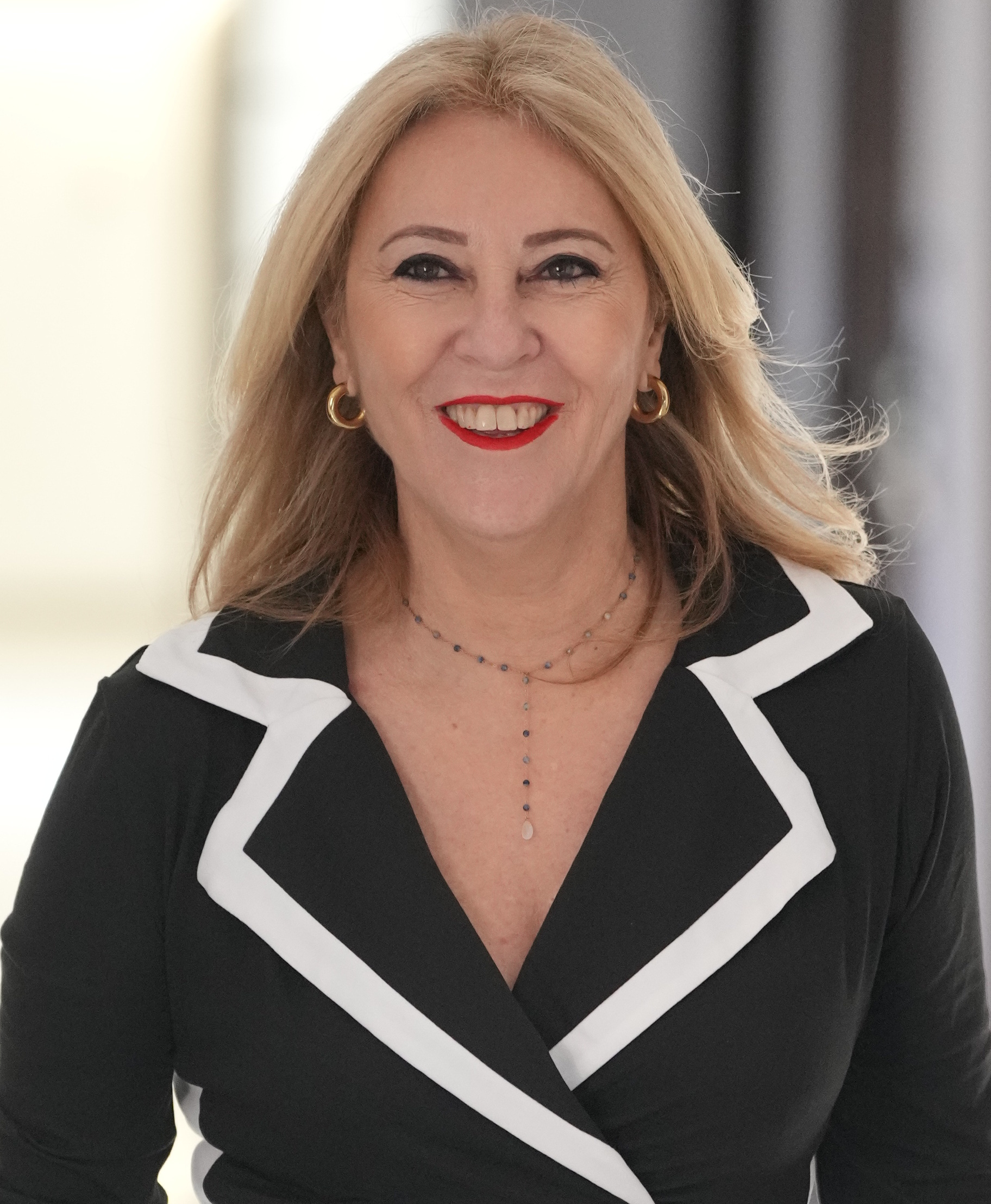
- España in 2025

Member of the Congress of Deputies
- In office 13 December 2011 – 26 July 2022
- Succeeded by: Gema Pérez Recuerda
- Constituency: Málaga

Personal details
- Born: 24 August 1969 (age 56)
- Party: People's Party

Carolina España Reina (born 24 August 1969) is a Spanish politician serving as minister of economy and finance of Andalusia since 2022. From 2011 to 2022, she was a member of the Congress of Deputies.
