= President of the Regional Government of Andalusia =

Head of government of the Spanish autonomous community of Andalusia

- Presidente de la Junta de Andalucía
- Seal of the Junta de Andalucía

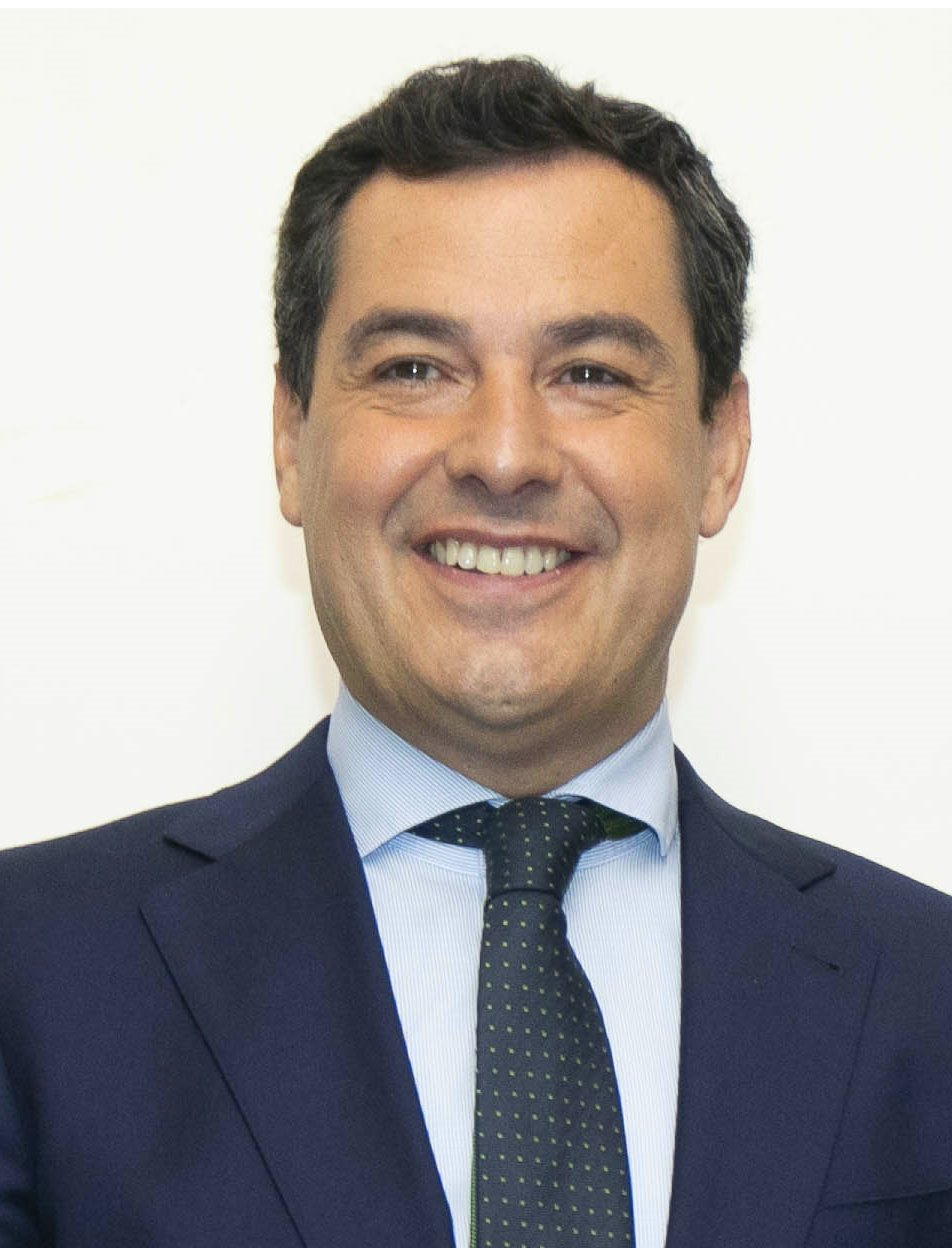
- Incumbent; Juanma Moreno since 18 January 2019
- Residence: Palacio de San Telmo, Seville
- Nominator: Parliament of Andalusia
- Appointer: The Monarch countersigned by the Prime Minister
- Term length: Four years
- Inaugural holder: Rafael Escuredo
- Formation: 1982
- Website: juntadeandalucia.es

The president of the Regional Government of Andalusia (Spanish: Presidente de la Junta de Andalucía) or, simply the president of Andalusia (Spanish: Presidente de Andalucía), is the premier of the devolved government of the Spanish autonomous community of Andalusia. The presidency is one of the three branches of the Regional Government of Andalusia (Junta de Andalucía), the institution whereby the government of the community is organized. The other two branches of are the Parliament of Andalusia and the Council of Government.

The current president of Andalusia is Juanma Moreno of the PP, who has held the office since 18 January 2019.

== Election ==
Under Article 118 of the regional Statute of Autonomy, investiture processes to elect the president of the Regional Government of Andalusia require of an absolute majority—more than half the votes cast—to be obtained in the first ballot in the Parliament of Andalusia. If unsuccessful, a new ballot will be held 48 hours later requiring only of a simple majority—more affirmative than negative votes—to succeed. If the proposed candidate is not elected, successive proposals are to be transacted under the same procedure. In the event of the investiture process failing to elect a regional president within a two-month period from the first ballot, the Parliament shall be automatically dissolved and a fresh election called. Before 2007, the Statute provided for these parliamentary deadlocks to be solved by deeming the candidate from the party with the highest number of seats to be automatically elected.

== Functions ==
The functions of the president of the Regional Government of Andalusia come regulated under Article 117 of the regional Statute, with him or her being tasked with the direction and coordination of the activity of the Council of Government, the coordination of regional Administration, the appointment and separation of the regional ministers and the supreme representation of both the autonomous community and the ordinary one of the State in Andalusia. The president is politically accountable to Parliament. may temporarily delegate his or her own executive functions to one of the vice presidents or regional ministers and may propose, on his/her own initiative or at the request of citizens—always in accordance with the provisions of Article 78 of the Statute as well as the State legislation—the holding of popular votes within the autonomous community, on matters of general interest in regional or local matters.

== List of officeholders ==
Governments:

- PSOE
- PP
- Mixed coalition

Portrait	Name (Birth–Death)	Term of office			Party	Government Composition	Election	Monarch (Reign)	Ref.
Portrait	Name (Birth–Death)	Took office	Left office	Duration	Party	Government Composition	Election	Monarch (Reign)	Ref.
	Plácido Fernández Viagas (1924–1982)	27 May 1978	2 June 1979	1 year and 6 days	PSOE–A	Viagas; PSOE–UCD–PCE	N/A	King; Juan Carlos I (1975–2014)	
	Rafael Escuredo (born 1944)	2 June 1979	24 July 1982	4 years and 282 days	PSOE–A	Escuredo I PSOE–UCD–PCE–PSA	N/A	King; Juan Carlos I (1975–2014)	
	Rafael Escuredo (born 1944)	24 July 1982	10 March 1984	4 years and 282 days	PSOE–A	Escuredo II; PSOE	1982	King; Juan Carlos I (1975–2014)	
	José Rodríguez de la Borbolla (born 1947)	10 March 1984	28 July 1986	6 years and 138 days	PSOE–A	Borbolla I PSOE	1982	King; Juan Carlos I (1975–2014)	
	José Rodríguez de la Borbolla (born 1947)	28 July 1986	26 July 1990	6 years and 138 days	PSOE–A	Borbolla II; PSOE	1986	King; Juan Carlos I (1975–2014)	
	Manuel Chaves (born 1945)	26 July 1990	30 July 1994	18 years and 255 days	PSOE–A	Chaves I PSOE	1990	King; Juan Carlos I (1975–2014)	
	Manuel Chaves (born 1945)	30 July 1994	13 April 1996	18 years and 255 days	PSOE–A	Chaves II; PSOE	1994	King; Juan Carlos I (1975–2014)	
	Manuel Chaves (born 1945)	13 April 1996	27 April 2000	18 years and 255 days	PSOE–A	Chaves III; PSOE–PA	1996	King; Juan Carlos I (1975–2014)	
	Manuel Chaves (born 1945)	27 April 2000	24 April 2004	18 years and 255 days	PSOE–A	Chaves IV; PSOE–PA	2000	King; Juan Carlos I (1975–2014)	
	Manuel Chaves (born 1945)	24 April 2004	18 April 2008	18 years and 255 days	PSOE–A	Chaves V PSOE	2004	King; Juan Carlos I (1975–2014)	
	Manuel Chaves (born 1945)	18 April 2008	7 April 2009 (resigned)	18 years and 255 days	PSOE–A	Chaves VI; PSOE	2008	King; Juan Carlos I (1975–2014)	
During this interval, First Vice President Gaspar Zarrías served as acting officeholder.						Chaves VI; PSOE	2008	King; Juan Carlos I (1975–2014)	
	José Antonio Griñán (born 1946)	23 April 2009	5 May 2012	4 years and 136 days	PSOE–A	Griñán I PSOE	2008	King; Juan Carlos I (1975–2014)	
	José Antonio Griñán (born 1946)	5 May 2012	6 September 2013	4 years and 136 days	PSOE–A	Griñán II; PSOE–IULV	2012	King; Juan Carlos I (1975–2014)	
	Susana Díaz (born 1974)	6 September 2013	13 June 2015	5 years and 134 days	PSOE–A	Díaz I PSOE–IULV until Jan 2015; PSOE from Jan 2015	2012	King; Juan Carlos I (1975–2014)	
	Susana Díaz (born 1974)	6 September 2013	13 June 2015	5 years and 134 days	PSOE–A	Díaz I PSOE–IULV until Jan 2015; PSOE from Jan 2015	2012	King; Felipe VI (2014–present)	
	Susana Díaz (born 1974)	13 June 2015	18 January 2019	5 years and 134 days	PSOE–A	Díaz II; PSOE	2015	King; Felipe VI (2014–present)	
	Juanma Moreno (born 1970)	18 January 2019	22 July 2022	7 years and 232 days	PP	Moreno I PP–Cs	2018	King; Felipe VI (2014–present)	
	Juanma Moreno (born 1970)	22 July 2022	4 July 2026	7 years and 232 days	PP	Moreno II; PP	2022	King; Felipe VI (2014–present)	
	Juanma Moreno (born 1970)	4 July 2026	Incumbent	7 years and 232 days	PP	Moreno III; PP–Vox	2026	King; Felipe VI (2014–present)	

=== Timeline ===
This is a graphical lifespan timeline of the presidents of the Regional Government of Andalusia. They are listed in order of first assuming office.
