= Rocío Díaz Jiménez =

Spanish politician (born 1975)

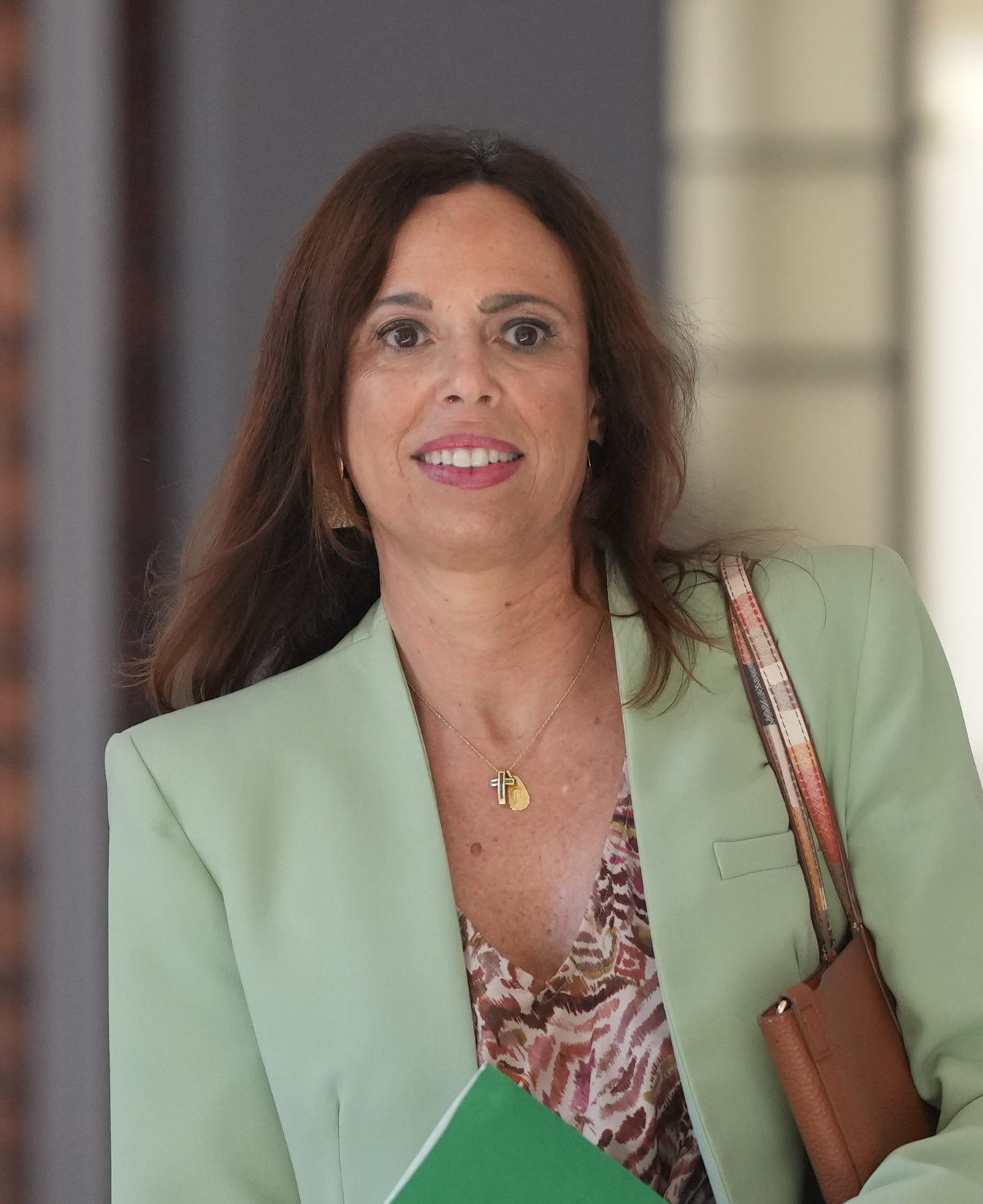
- Díaz in 2023

Member of the Senate
- In office 20 December 2015 – 2 May 2016
- Constituency: Granada

Personal details
- Born: 25 May 1975 (age 51)
- Party: People's Party

María Rocío Díaz Jiménez (born 25 May 1975) is a Spanish politician serving as minister of development, territorial planning and housing of Andalusia since 2023. From 2015 to 2016, she was a member of the Senate.
