= Antonio Sanz =

Spanish politician (born 1968)

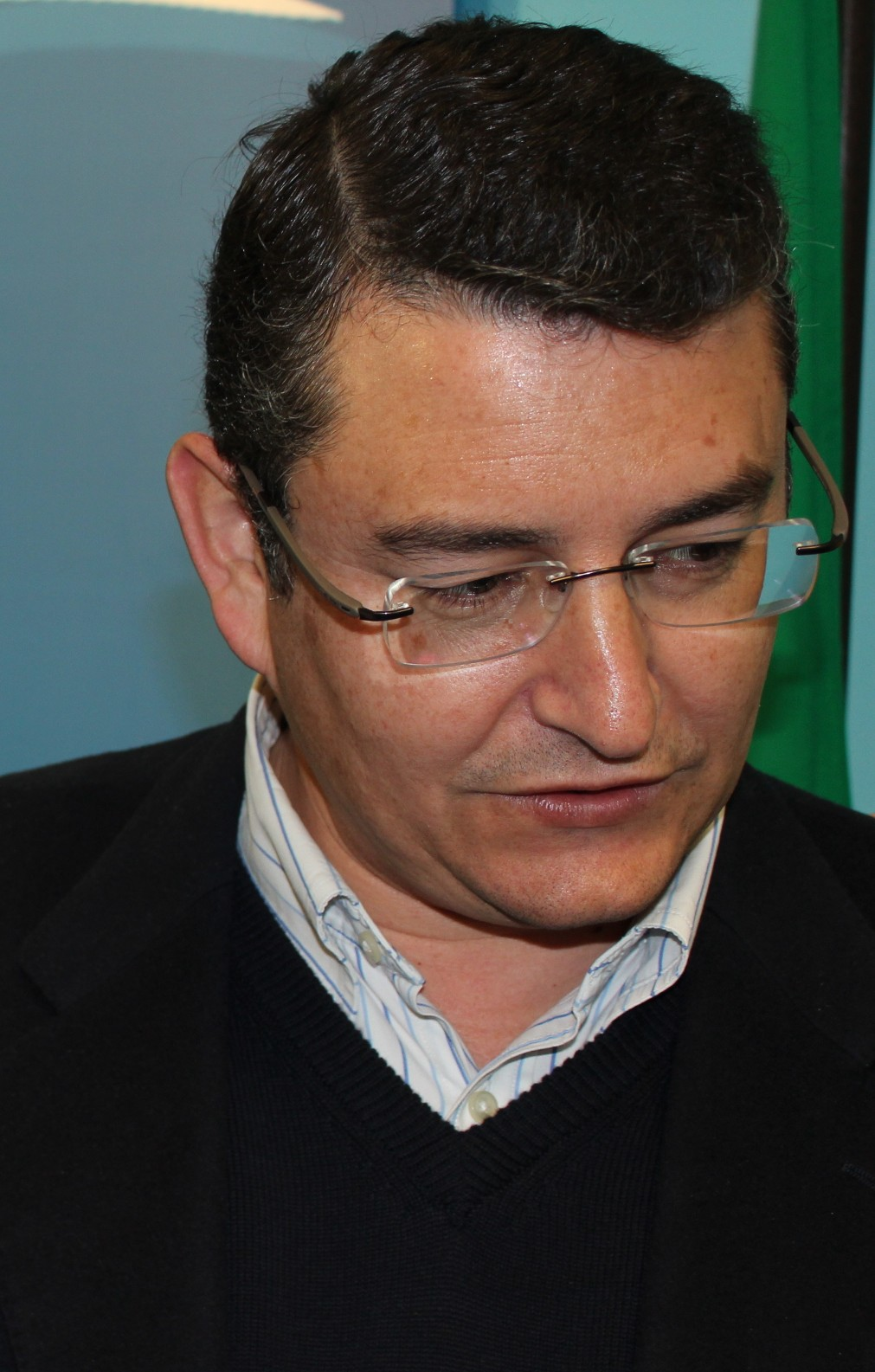
- Antonio Sanz in 2010
- Born: October 1968 (age 57); Jerez de la Frontera, Spain
- Occupation: Politician

Antonio Sanz Cabello (born in Jerez de la Frontera, Spain in 1968) is a lawyer and politician. He is currently first vice-president and minister for the Presidency, Interior, Social Dialogue and Administrative Simplification for the Regional Government of Andalucia.

Licensed in law by the Colegio Provincial de Abogados de Cádiz, Sanz is currently General Secretary of the People's Party of Andalusia since July 2006, regional deputy of the Andalusian Parliament since March 2004 and a member of the National Board of Directors of the People's Party since 1996.
