= Next Andalusian regional election =

Election in the Spanish region of Andalusia

- No later than 16 June 2030

All 109 seats in the Parliament of Andalusia 55 seats needed for a majority
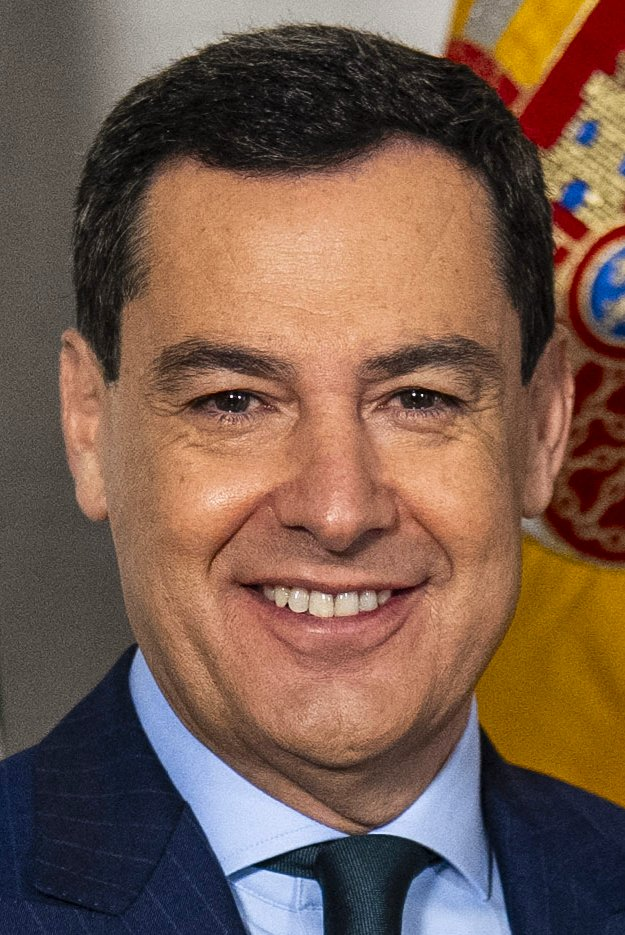

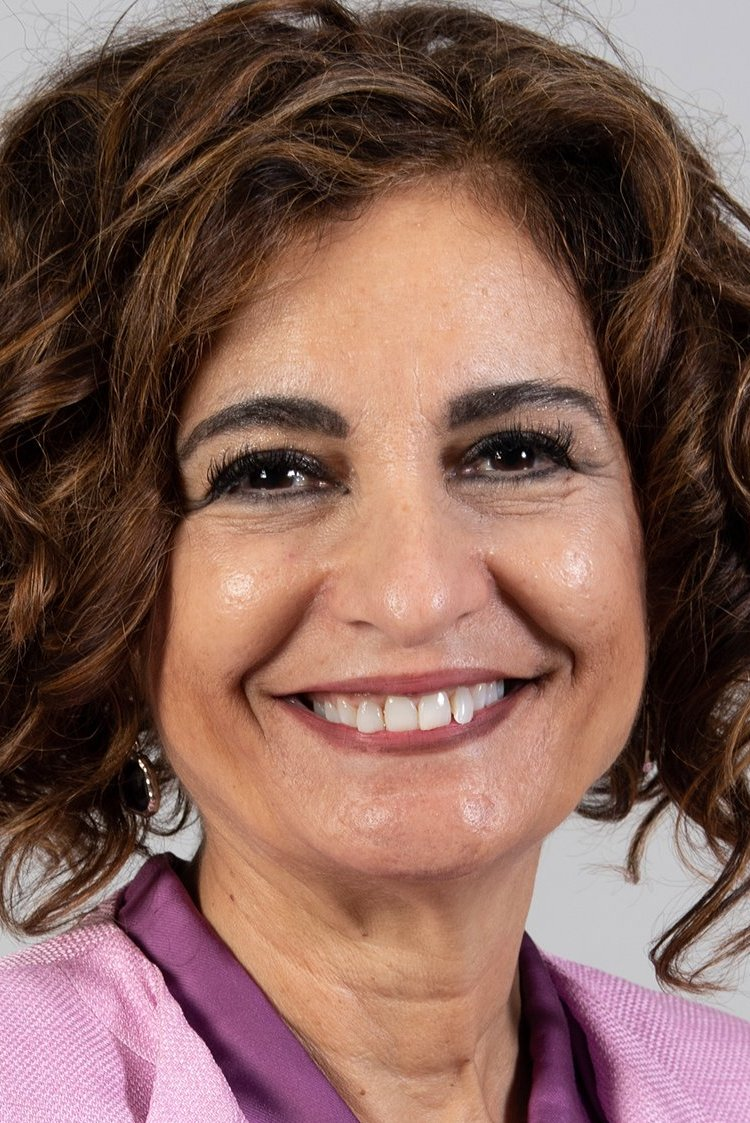

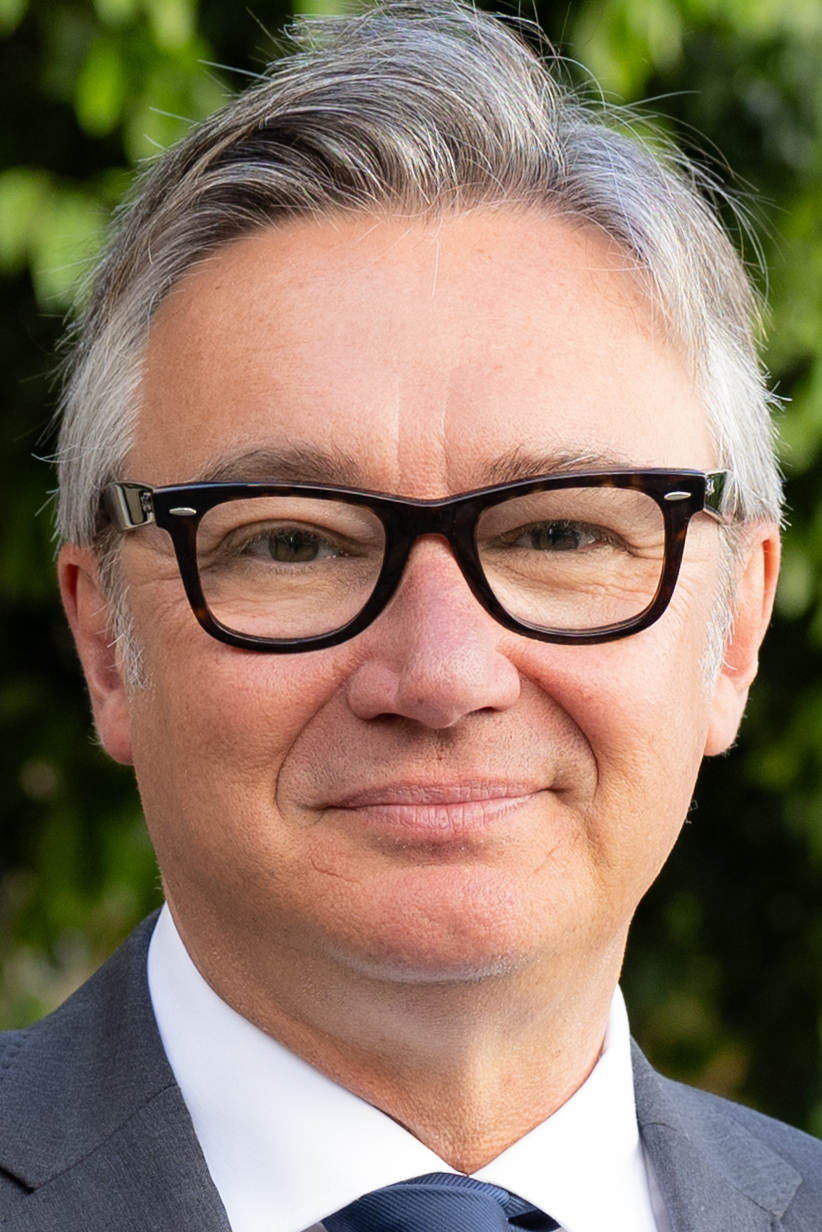

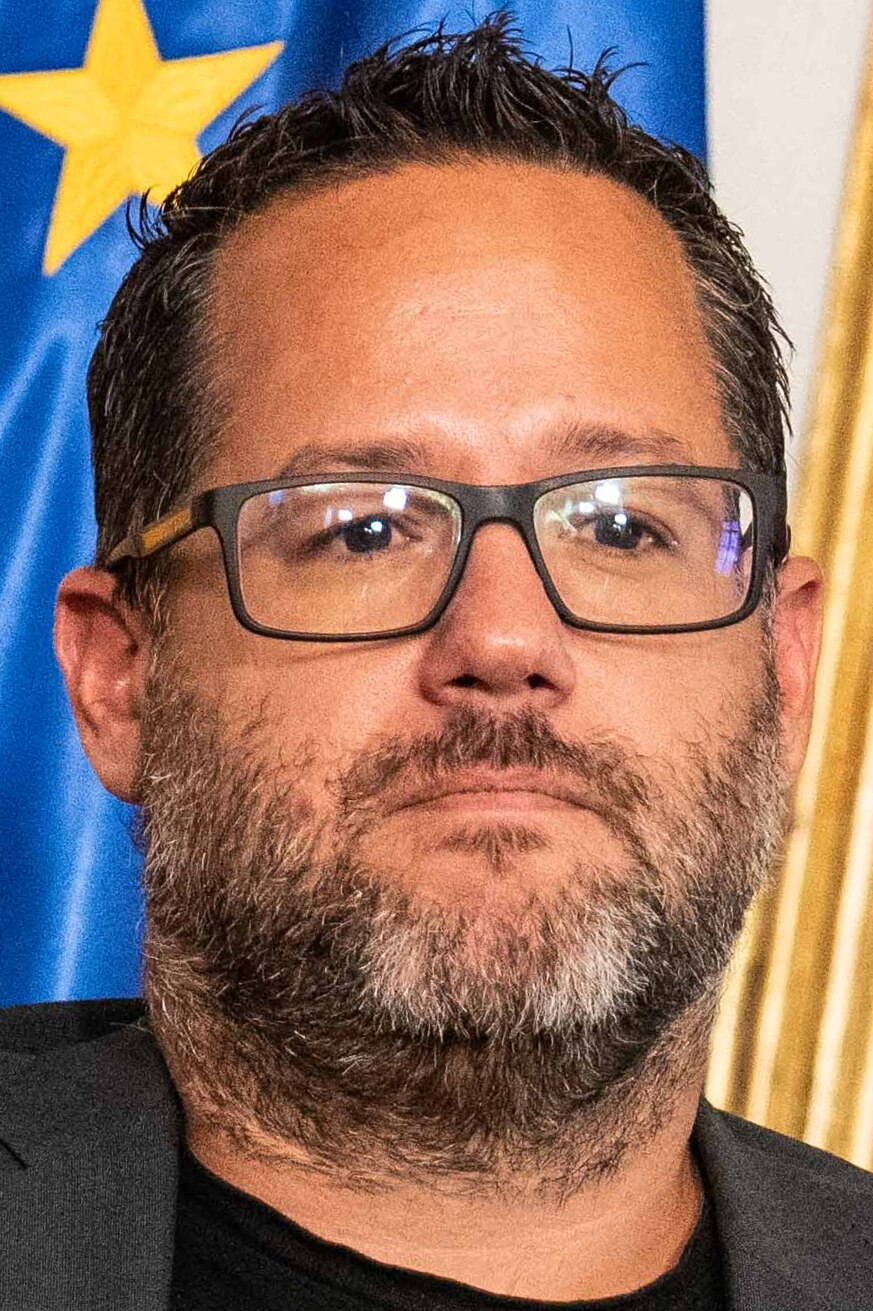

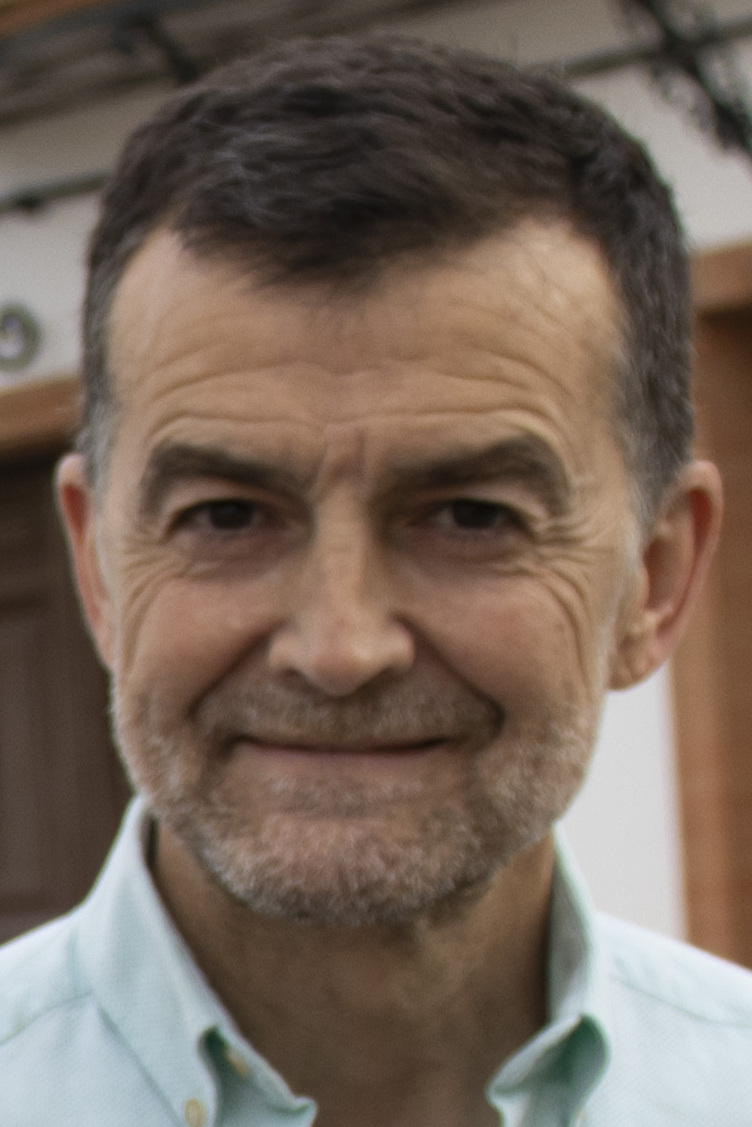
Leader	Juanma Moreno	María Jesús Montero	Manuel Gavira
Party	PP	PSOE–A	Vox
Leader since	1 March 2014	23 February 2025	10 August 2022
Leader's seat	Málaga	Seville	Cádiz
Last election	53 seats, 41.6%	28 seats, 22.8%	15 seats, 13.5%
Current seats	53	28	15
Seats needed	▲2	▲27	▲40
Leader	José Ignacio García	Antonio Maíllo
Party	Adelante Andalucía	PorA
Leader since	16 March 2024	20 November 2025
Leader's seat	Cádiz	Seville
Last election	8 seats, 9.6%	5 seats, 6.3%
Current seats	8	5
Seats needed	▲47	▲50
Incumbent President
Juanma Moreno
PP

A regional election will be held in Andalusia no later than 16 June 2030 to elect the 14th Parliament of the autonomous community. All 109 seats in the Parliament will be up for election. With the 2026 election having resulted in a hung parliament and with regional president Juanma Moreno reportedly unwilling to let far-right Vox into his government, Spanish media have speculated on the increasing likelihood of a repeat election taking place. During his investiture speech on 29 June, Moreno threatened with a repeat election on 25 October 2026 as Vox announced its opposition to cave in to his demands. Moreno's failure in the first ballot of investiture saw him backtracking and accepting to let Vox into government as well as adopt a number of the party's proposals.

== Overview ==
Under the 2007 Statute of Autonomy, the Parliament of Andalusia is the unicameral legislature of the homonymous autonomous community, having legislative power in devolved matters, as well as the ability to grant or withdraw confidence from a regional president. The electoral and procedural rules are supplemented by national law provisions.

=== Date ===
The term of the Parliament of Andalusia expires four years after the date of its previous election, unless it is dissolved earlier. The election decree shall be issued no later than 25 days before the scheduled expiration date of parliament and published on the following day in the Official Gazette of the Regional Government of Andalusia (BOJA), with election day taking place 54 days after the decree's publication (barring any date within from 1 July to 31 August). The previous election was held on 17 May 2026, which means that the chamber's term will expire on 17 May 2030. The election decree shall be published in the BOJA no later than 23 April 2030, setting the latest possible date for election day on 16 June 2030.

The regional president has the prerogative to dissolve the Parliament of Andalusia at any given time and call a snap election, provided that no motion of no confidence is in process and that dissolution does not occur before one year after a previous one. In the event of an investiture process failing to elect a regional president within a two-month period from the first ballot, the Parliament is to be automatically dissolved and a fresh election called.

The 2026 election led to the ruling People's Party (PP) under Juanma Moreno losing the absolute majority it had held during the four previous years, meaning it needed the support of the far-right Vox party to retain power. Moreno's resistance to rely on Vox's support—in exchange of programmatic concessions he was vocally unwilling to accept—led to media outlets to comment on the possibility of a repeat election being required later in the year. With the first investiture ballot taking place on 30 June 2026, a repeat election was automatically set for 25 October in the event that no regional president is elected before 30 August.

=== Electoral system ===
Voting for the Parliament is based on universal suffrage, comprising all Spanish nationals over 18 years of age, registered in Andalusia and with full political rights, provided that they have not been deprived of the right to vote by a final sentence.

The Parliament of Andalusia has a minimum of 109 seats, with electoral provisions fixing its size at that number. All are elected in eight multi-member constituencies—corresponding to the provinces of Almería, Cádiz, Córdoba, Granada, Huelva, Jaén, Málaga and Seville, each of which is assigned an initial minimum of eight seats and the remaining 45 distributed in proportion to population (with the number of seats in each province not exceeding two times that of any other)—using the D'Hondt method and closed-list proportional voting, with a three percent-threshold of valid votes (including blank ballots) in each constituency. The use of this electoral method may result in a higher effective threshold depending on district magnitude and vote distribution.

As a result of the aforementioned allocation, each Parliament constituency would be entitled the following seats (as of 11 December 2025): (Note: This seat allocation has been manually calculated by applying the electoral rules set out in the law, on the basis of the latest official population figures provided by the Spanish government as of 2026. As such, it should be deemed as a provisional, non-binding estimation. The definitive allocation will be determined by the election decree at the time of the parliament's dissolution.)

Seats	Constituencies
18	Seville
17	Málaga
15	Cádiz
13	Granada
12	Almería, Córdoba
11	Huelva, Jaén

The law does not provide for by-elections to fill vacant seats; instead, any vacancies arising after the proclamation of candidates and during the legislative term will be filled by the next candidates on the party lists or, when required, by designated substitutes.

== Parties and candidates ==
The electoral law allows for parties and federations registered in the interior ministry, alliances and groupings of electors to present lists of candidates. Parties and federations intending to form an alliance are required to inform the relevant electoral commission within 10 days of the election call, whereas groupings of electors need to secure the signature of at least one percent of the electorate in the constituencies for which they seek election, disallowing electors from signing for more than one list. Additionally, a balanced composition of men and women is required in the electoral lists through the use of a zipper system.

Below is a list of the main parties and alliances which will likely contest the election:

Candidacy	Parties and alliances	Leading candidate	Ideology	Previous result		Gov.	Ref.
Candidacy	Parties and alliances	Leading candidate	Ideology	Vote %	Seats	Gov.	Ref.
PP	List: People's Party (PP)	Juanma Moreno	Conservatism; Christian democracy	41.6%	53	Yes	
PSOE–A	List: Spanish Socialist Workers' Party of Andalusia (PSOE–A)	María Jesús Montero	Social democracy	22.8%	28	No	
Vox	List: Vox (Vox)	Manuel Gavira	Right-wing populism Ultranationalism; National conservatism	13.8%	15	Yes	
Adelante; Andalucía	List: Forward Andalusia (Adelante Andalucía)	José Ignacio García	Andalusian nationalism Left-wing populism Anti-capitalism	9.6%	8	No	
PorA	List: United Left/The Greens–Assembly for Andalusia (IULV–CA) – Communist Party of Andalusia (PCA) – The Dawn Marxist Organization (La Aurora (OM)) – Republican Left (IR); We Can (Podemos); Unite Movement (MS); Andalusian People's Initiative (IdPA); Greens Equo–Green Party (VQ–PV); Republican Alternative (ALTER); Green Alliance (AV)	Antonio Maíllo	Left-wing populism Green politics	6.3%	5	No	

== Opinion polls ==
The tables below list opinion polling results in reverse chronological order, showing the most recent first and using the dates when the survey fieldwork was done, as opposed to the date of publication. Where the fieldwork dates are unknown, the date of publication is given instead. The highest percentage figure in each polling survey is displayed with its background shaded in the leading party's colour. If a tie ensues, this is applied to the figures with the highest percentages. The "Lead" column on the right shows the percentage-point difference between the parties with the highest percentages in a poll.

=== Voting intention estimates ===
The table below lists weighted voting intention estimates. Refusals are generally excluded from the party vote percentages, while question wording and the treatment of "don't know" responses and those not intending to vote may vary between polling organisations. When available, seat projections determined by the polling organisations are also displayed below (or in place of) the voting estimates in a smaller font; 55 seats are required for an absolute majority in the Parliament of Andalusia.

Polling firm/Commissioner	Fieldwork date	Sample size	Turnout	PP	PSOE–A	Vox	Adelante Andalucía (2021)	PorA	Lead
CENTRA/CEA	11–25 Sep 2026	3,600	59.2	41.5; 52/53	18.9; 23/26	16.1; 16/20	12.5; 9/10	6.5; 4/5	22.6
2026 regional election	17 May 2026	—N/a	62.3	41.6; 53	22.8; 28	13.8; 15	9.6; 8	6.3; 5	18.8

=== Voting preferences ===
The table below lists raw, unweighted voting preferences.

Polling firm/Commissioner	Fieldwork date	Sample size	PP	PSOE–A	Vox	Adelante Andalucía (2021)	PorA	SALF	Question	X mark	Lead
CENTRA/CEA	11–25 Sep 2026	3,600	30.6	14.1	13.1	12.9	6.1	1.5	7.6	5.5	16.5
2026 regional election (Note: Does not include non-resident citizens.)	17 May 2026	—N/a	26.7	14.6	8.9	6.2	4.1	1.6	—N/a	35.2	12.1

== Bibliography ==
- Ley Orgánica 5/1985, de 19 de junio, del Régimen Electoral General (Organic Law 5/1985). Official State Gazette (in Spanish). 19 June 1985 [version as of 2 July 2026]. BOE-A-1985-11672.
- Ley 1/1986, de 2 de enero, Electoral de Andalucía (Law 1/1986). Official State Gazette (in Spanish). 2 January 1986 [version as of 24 December 2019]. BOE-A-1986-2788.
- Ley 6/2006, de 24 de octubre, del Gobierno de la Comunidad Autónoma de Andalucía (Law 6/2006). Official State Gazette (in Spanish). 24 October 2006 [version as of 16 February 2024]. BOE-A-2006-20848.
- Ley Orgánica 2/2007, de 19 de marzo, de reforma del Estatuto de Autonomía para Andalucía (Organic Law 2/2007). Official State Gazette (in Spanish). 19 March 2007 [version as of 28 December 2022]. BOE-A-2007-5825.
