= 2026 Andalusian regional election =

Election in the Spanish region of Andalusia

- 17 May 2026

All 109 seats in the Parliament of Andalusia 55 seats needed for a majority
- Registered: 6,812,876 ▲2.6%
- Turnout: 4,244,414 (62.3%) ▲6.2 pp
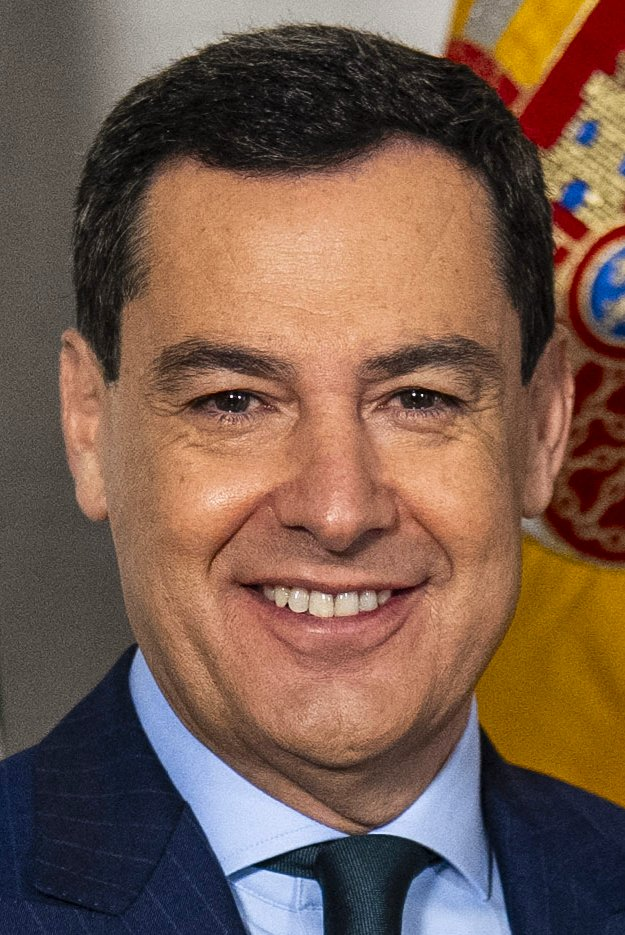

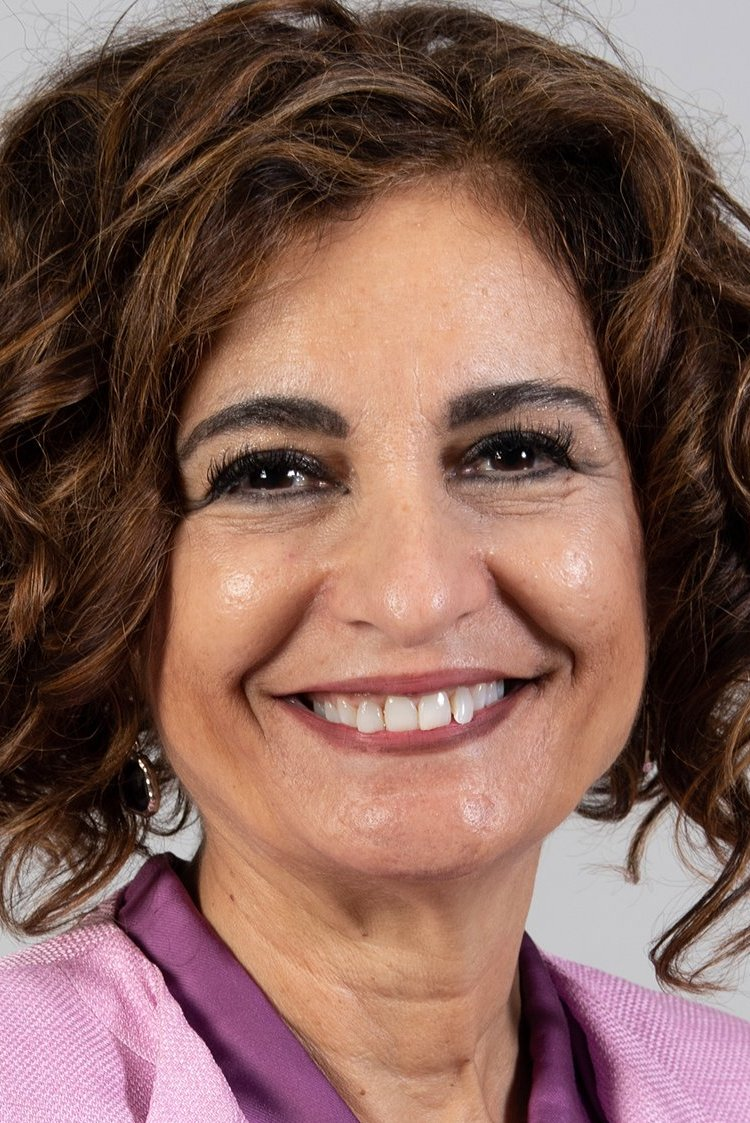

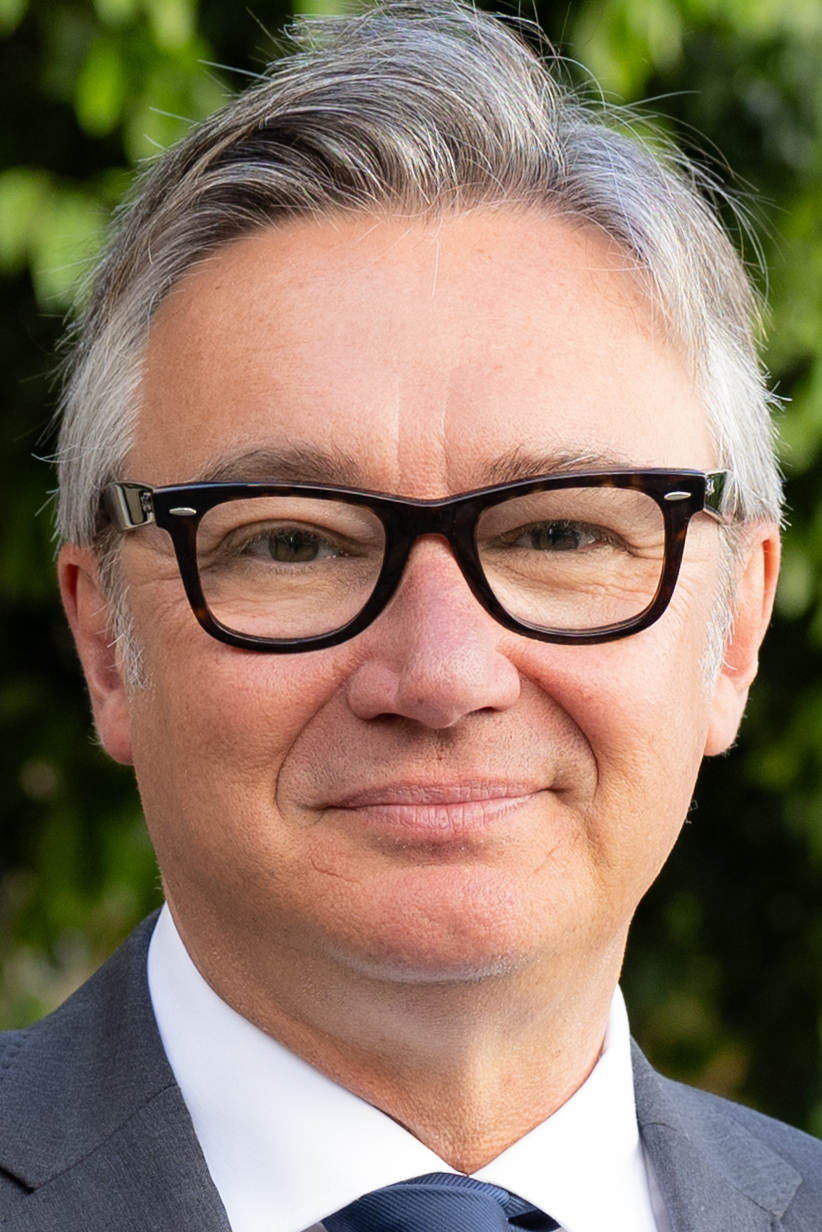

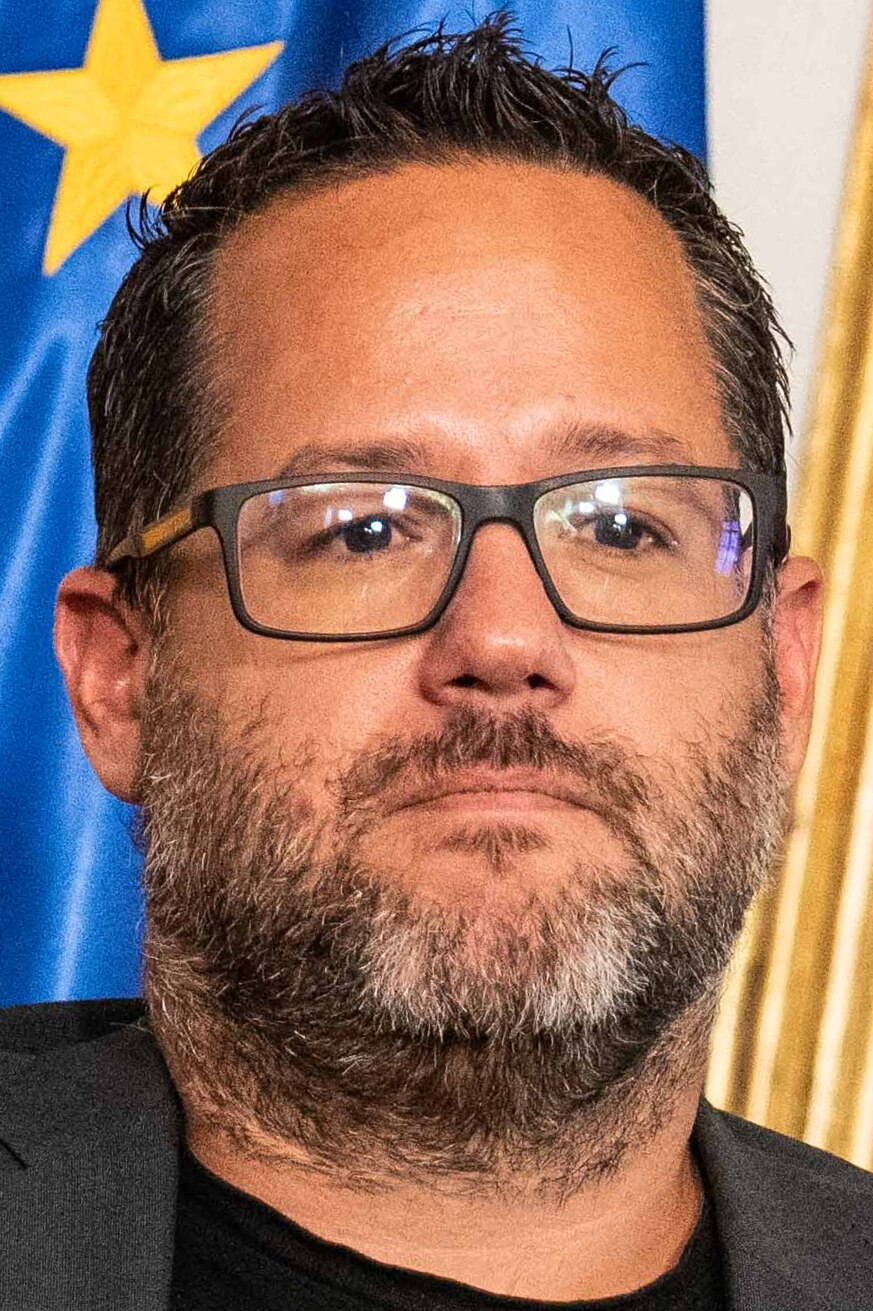

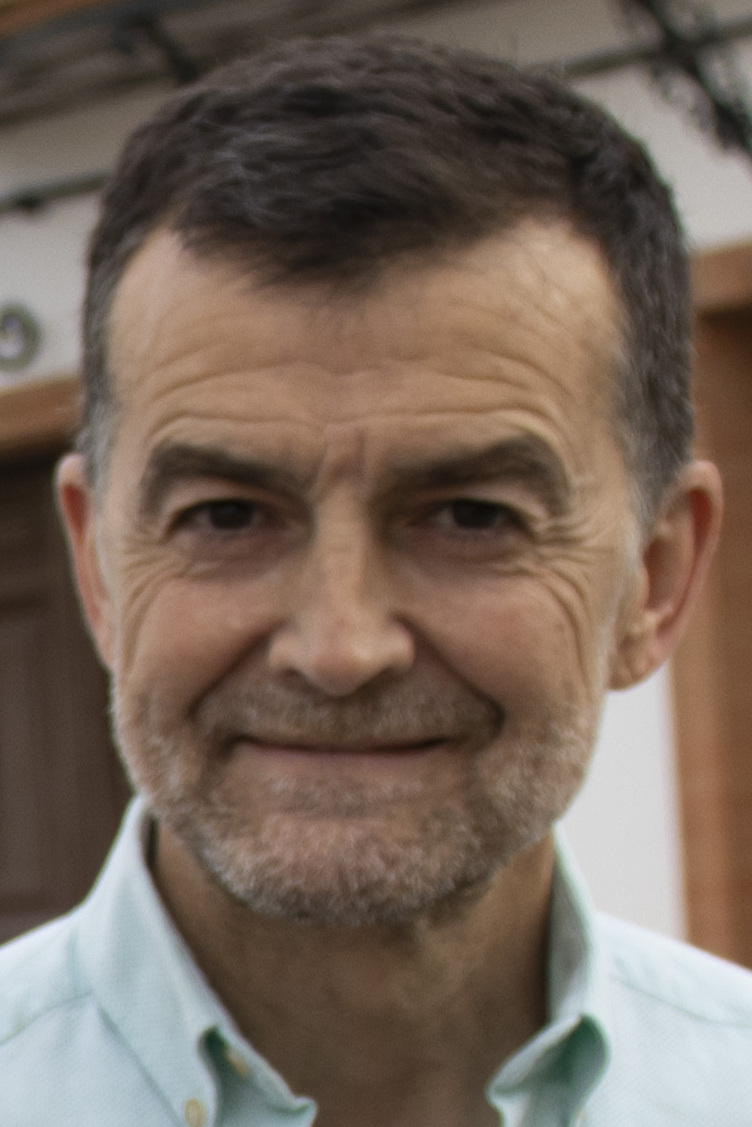
	First party	Second party	Third party
Leader	Juanma Moreno	María Jesús Montero	Manuel Gavira
Party	PP	PSOE–A	Vox
Leader since	1 March 2014	23 February 2025	10 August 2022
Leader's seat	Málaga	Seville	Cádiz
Last election	58 seats, 43.1%	30 seats, 24.1%	14 seats, 13.5%
Seats won	53	28	15
Seat change	▼5	▼2	▲1
Popular vote	1,744,728	955,584	580,293
Percentage	41.6%	22.8%	13.8%
Swing	▼1.5 pp	▼1.3 pp	▲0.3 pp
	Fourth party	Fifth party
Leader	José Ignacio García	Antonio Maíllo
Party	Adelante Andalucía	PorA
Leader since	16 March 2024	20 November 2025
Leader's seat	Cádiz	Seville
Last election	2 seats, 4.6%	5 seats, 7.7%
Seats won	8	5
Seat change	▲6	0
Popular vote	403,560	266,213
Percentage	9.6%	6.3%
Swing	▲5.0 pp	▼1.4 pp
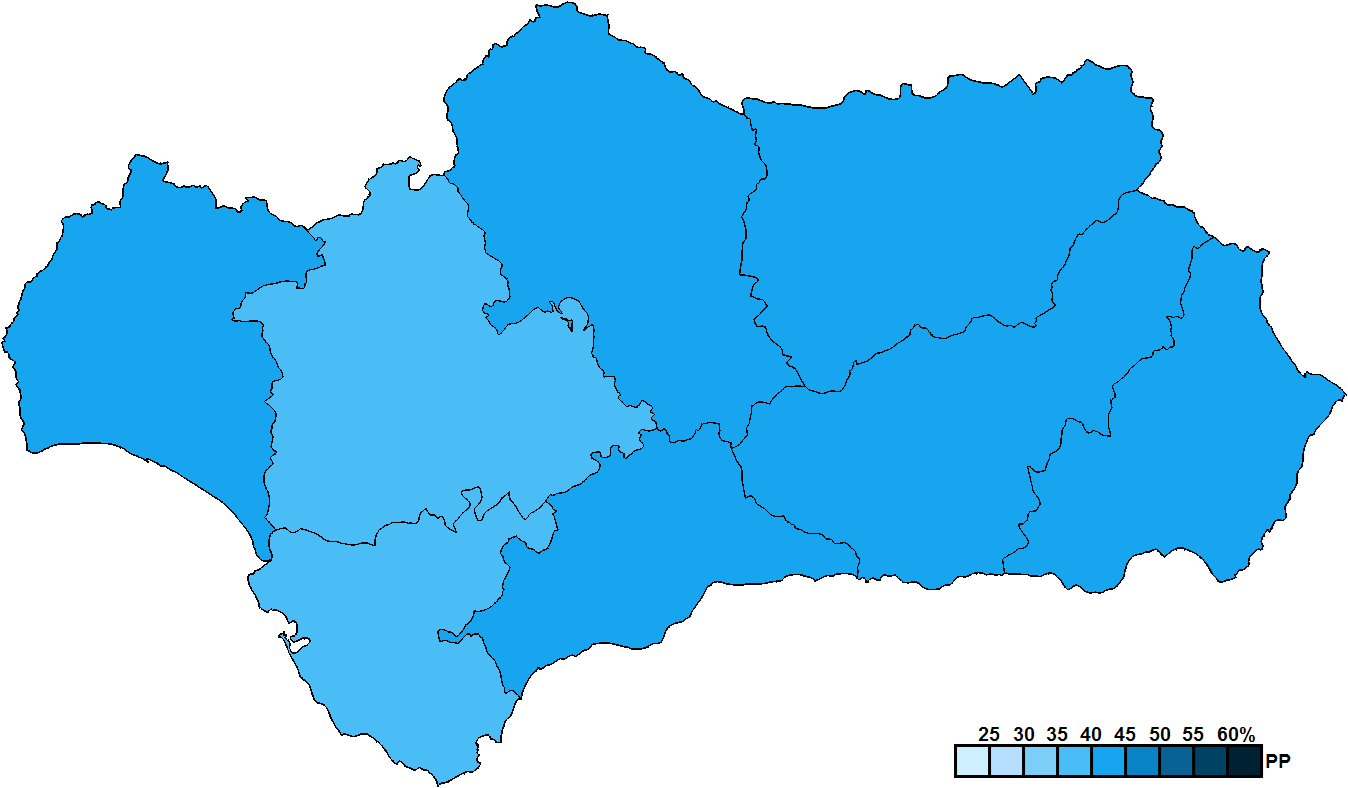
President before election
Juanma Moreno
PP
President after election
Juanma Moreno
PP

A regional election was held in Andalusia on 17 May 2026 to elect the 13th Parliament of the autonomous community. All 109 seats in the Parliament were up for election.

The People's Party (PP) under regional president Juanma Moreno secured an overall majority in the 2022 election, the first time in history this happened in an autonomous community which had been uninterruptedly ruled by the Spanish Socialist Workers' Party of Andalusia (PSOE–A) from 1978 to 2019. In an attempt to revitalize the party, María Jesús Montero—the national first deputy prime minister and finance minister—was appointed as new PSOE–A leader in February 2025, replacing Juan Espadas. Meanwhile, Moreno's government, which had enjoyed relative political stability for years, was rocked in October 2025 by a healthcare scandal stemming from a mishandling of breast cancer screening protocols by the Andalusian Health Service, the management of which by the PP sparked widespread public outrage.

Amid the largest voter turnout since 2015, the election saw the ruling PP losing its absolute majority, despite previous expectations that it could hold onto it. The opposition PSOE lost two additional seats to score its worst historical result in the region, but narrowly avoided the worst predictions of a collapse in support. Far-right Vox saw modest gains, whereas the left-wing Forward Andalusia party secured a surprise breakthrough with 8 seats and almost 10% of the vote. The United Left-led For Andalusia alliance remained stagnant at five seats. The outcome also saw the right-wing bloc losing support overall compared to the previous election, the first time in several years of elections in Spain that this happened.

== Background ==
The 2022 regional election saw the People's Party (PP) under regional president Juanma Moreno securing an absolute majority in the regional parliament for the first time in history, which allowed him to form a majority government. Conversely, the Spanish Socialist Workers' Party of Andalusia (PSOE–A) under regional leader Juan Espadas obtained its worst historical result, a blow for a party which had uninterruptedly held power in the region from 1978 to 2019. Espadas, who since December 2021 had held a Senate seat, was appointed as the PSOE's spokesperson in that chamber in November 2023, paving the way for the national first deputy prime minister and minister of Finance, María Jesús Montero, to become the PSOE–A's new leader in February 2025.

In October 2025, the Andalusian government became embroiled in a healthcare scandal stemming from a mishandling of breast cancer screening protocols by the Andalusian Health Service (SAS), with at least 2,000 women having suffered unjustified delays in breast cancer diagnoses (traced to a faulty outsourcing of the notification system to an external company) that could significantly reduce their survival rate. It saw several resignations in an attempt to contain political backlash, including those of the regional Health minister, Rocío Hernández Soto, and two officials at the Virgen del Rocío University Hospital in Seville—the head of radiodiagnosis and the coordinator of the breast imaging unit—where most of the cases were traced. On 21 October, the crisis escalated after a breast cancer awareness organization filed a legal complaint against an alleged manipulation and disappearance of some cancer patients' medical records, which Moreno's government blamed on a "computer failure" caused by the victims' creating a "beastly social alarm" that collapsed their systems. Public outrage at the PP's management of the crisis, which added up to those of the October 2024 floods in the Valencian Community and the August 2025 wildfires in Castile and León, weakened the party's standing and eroded its narrative as a good manager.

== Overview ==
Under the 2007 Statute of Autonomy, the Parliament of Andalusia was the unicameral legislature of the homonymous autonomous community, having legislative power in devolved matters, as well as the ability to grant or withdraw confidence from a regional president. The electoral and procedural rules were supplemented by national law provisions.

=== Date ===
The term of the Parliament of Andalusia expired four years after the date of its previous election, unless it was dissolved earlier. The election decree was required to be issued no later than 25 days before the scheduled expiration date of parliament and published on the following day in the Official Gazette of the Regional Government of Andalusia (BOJA), with election day taking place 54 days after the decree's publication (barring any date within from 1 July to 31 August). The previous election was held on 19 June 2022, which meant that the chamber's term would have expired on 19 June 2026. Due to the ban on summer elections, the latest possible date for election day was 30 June 2026, meaning the election decree was required to be published in the BOJA no later than 7 May 2026.

The regional president had the prerogative to dissolve the Parliament of Andalusia at any given time and call a snap election, provided that no motion of no confidence was in process and that dissolution did not occur before one year after a previous one. In the event of an investiture process failing to elect a regional president within a two-month period from the first ballot, the Parliament was to be automatically dissolved and a fresh election called.

Speculation emerged in September 2025 that the national leadership of the People's Party (PP) was planning to advance the elections in Aragon and Extremadura to make them take place near or concurrently with the Castilian-Leonese election scheduled for early 2026, in an electoral "Super Sunday". While the alleged justification would be the regional governments' failure in getting their 2026 budgets passed through parliament, the true motive was attributed to PP plans—not without risk—to turn the simultaneous election call into a referendum on the national government of Prime Minister Pedro Sánchez. While an advancement of the Andalusian election (scheduled for no later than June 2026) was commented within such plans, regional president Juanma Moreno dismissed this possibility except in the event of Sánchez calling a snap general election before that date. The possibility of an election postponement until September 2026, in order to circumvent the ban on summer elections imposed by the Andalusian electoral law, was also ruled out by Moreno over political and legal concerns on its feasibility. The breast cancer screening scandal in October 2025 was said to have affected Moreno's electoral plans, with doubts existing on the opportunity of fostering a concerted "Super Sunday" action by several PP-controlled regions.

President Moreno confirmed on 26 February 2026 that the Parliament would be dissolved in April, which narrowed the possibilities for election day as being one of the following Sundays: 31 May, 7, 14 or 21 June. Several of them were commented as presenting difficulties: 31 May would overlap with the Romería de El Rocío pilgrimage; 7 June would coincide with Pope Leo XIV's scheduled visit to Spain; and 21 June was commented as being too close to the high temperature season. On 23 March 2026, Moreno announced the election for 17 May.

The Parliament of Andalusia was officially dissolved on 24 March 2026 with the publication of the corresponding decree in the BOJA, setting election day for 17 May and scheduling for the chamber to reconvene on 11 June.

=== Electoral system ===
Voting for the Parliament was based on universal suffrage, comprising all Spanish nationals over 18 years of age, registered in Andalusia and with full political rights, provided that they had not been deprived of the right to vote by a final sentence. Amendments in 2022 abolished the "begged" voting system (Spanish: Voto rogado), under which non-resident citizens were required to apply for voting. The begged vote system was attributed responsibility for a major decrease in the turnout of Spaniards abroad during the years it was in force.

The Parliament of Andalusia had a minimum of 109 seats, with electoral provisions fixing its size at that number. All were elected in eight multi-member constituencies—corresponding to the provinces of Almería, Cádiz, Córdoba, Granada, Huelva, Jaén, Málaga and Seville, each of which was assigned an initial minimum of eight seats and the remaining 45 distributed in proportion to population (with the number of seats in each province not exceeding two times that of any other)—using the D'Hondt method and closed-list proportional voting, with a three percent-threshold of valid votes (including blank ballots) in each constituency. The use of this electoral method resulted in a higher effective threshold depending on district magnitude and vote distribution.

As a result of the aforementioned allocation, each Parliament constituency was entitled the following seats:

Seats	Constituencies
18	Seville
17	Málaga
15	Cádiz
13	Granada
12	Almería, Córdoba
11	Huelva, Jaén

The law did not provide for by-elections to fill vacant seats; instead, any vacancies arising after the proclamation of candidates and during the legislative term were filled by the next candidates on the party lists or, when required, by designated substitutes.

=== Outgoing parliament ===
The table below shows the composition of the parliamentary groups in the chamber at the time of dissolution.

Parliamentary composition in March 2026
Groups	Parties	Legislators	
Groups	Parties	Seats	Total
Andalusian People's Parliamentary Group	PP	58	58
Socialist Parliamentary Group	PSOE–A	30	30
Vox Parliamentary Group in Andalusia	Vox	14	14
For Andalusia Parliamentary Group	Podemos	3	5
For Andalusia Parliamentary Group	IULV–CA	1	5
For Andalusia Parliamentary Group	MS	1	5
Mixed Group	AA	2	2

== Parties and candidates ==
The electoral law allows for parties and federations registered in the interior ministry, alliances and groupings of electors to present lists of candidates. Parties and federations intending to form an alliance are required to inform the relevant electoral commission within 10 days of the election call, whereas groupings of electors need to secure the signature of at least one percent of the electorate in the constituencies for which they seek election, disallowing electors from signing for more than one list. Additionally, a balanced composition of men and women is required in the electoral lists through the use of a zipper system.

Below is a list of the main parties and alliances which will likely contest the election:

Candidacy	Parties and alliances	Leading candidate	Ideology	Previous result		Gov.	Ref.
Candidacy	Parties and alliances	Leading candidate	Ideology	Vote %	Seats	Gov.	Ref.
PP	List: People's Party (PP)	Juanma Moreno	Conservatism; Christian democracy	43.1%	58	Yes	
PSOE–A	List: Spanish Socialist Workers' Party of Andalusia (PSOE–A)	María Jesús Montero	Social democracy	24.1%	30	No	
Vox	List: Vox (Vox)	Manuel Gavira	Right-wing populism Ultranationalism; National conservatism	13.5%	14	No	
PorA	List: United Left/The Greens–Assembly for Andalusia (IULV–CA) – Communist Party of Andalusia (PCA) – The Dawn Marxist Organization (La Aurora (OM)) – Republican Left (IR); We Can (Podemos); Unite Movement (MS); Andalusian People's Initiative (IdPA); Greens Equo–Green Party (VQ–PV); Republican Alternative (ALTER); Green Alliance (AV)	Antonio Maíllo	Left-wing populism Green politics	7.7%	5	No	
Adelante; Andalucía	List: Forward Andalusia (Adelante Andalucía)	José Ignacio García	Andalusian nationalism Left-wing populism Anti-capitalism	4.6%	2	No	

== Campaign ==
=== Timetable ===
The key dates are listed below (all times are CET):

- 23 March: The election decree is issued with the countersign of the president, after deliberation in the Council of Government.
- 24 March: Formal dissolution of parliament and start of prohibition period on the inauguration of public works, services or projects.
- 27 March: Initial constitution of provincial and zone electoral commissions with judicial members.
- 30 March: Division of constituencies into polling sections and stations.
- 3 April: Deadline for parties and federations to report on their electoral alliances.
- 6 April: Deadline for electoral register consultation for the purpose of possible corrections.
- 13 April: Deadline for parties, federations, alliances, and groupings of electors to present electoral lists.
- 15 April: Publication of submitted electoral lists in the Official Gazette of the Regional Government of Andalusia (BOJA).
- 20 April: Official proclamation of validly submitted electoral lists.
- 21 April: Publication of proclaimed electoral lists in the BOJA.
- 22 April: Deadline for the selection of polling station members by sortition.
- 30 April: Deadline for the appointment of non-judicial members to provincial and zone electoral commissions.
- 1 May: Official start of electoral campaigning.
- 7 May: Deadline to apply for postal voting.
- 12 May: Start of legal ban on electoral opinion polling publication; deadline for non-resident citizens (electors residing abroad (CERA) and citizens temporarily absent from Spain) to vote by mail.
- 13 May: Deadline for postal and temporarily absent voting.
- 14 May: Deadline for CERA voting.
- 15 May: Last day of electoral campaigning.
- 16 May: Official election silence ("reflection day").
- 17 May: Election day (polling stations open at 9 am and close at 8 pm or once voters present in a queue at/outside the polling station at 8 pm have cast their vote); provisional vote counting.
- 22 May: Start of general vote counting, including CERA votes.
- 25 May: Deadline for the general vote counting.
- 3 June: Deadline for the proclamation of elected members.
- 11 June: Deadline for the reconvening of parliament (date determined by the election decree, which for the 2026 election was set for 11 June).
- 13 July: Deadline for the publication of definitive election results in the BOJA.

=== Party slogans ===
Party or alliance	Original slogan	English translation	Ref.
PP	« Con la fuerza de Andalucía »	"With the strength of Andalusia"	
PSOE–A	« Defiende lo público »	"Defend public services"	
Vox	« Sentido común »	"Common sense"	
PorA	« La izquierda andaluza »	"The Andalusian Left"	
Adelante Andalucía	« Vota lo que sientes »	"Vote what you feel"	

=== Debates ===
2026 Andalusian regional election debates
Date	Organizer(s)	Moderator(s)	P Present (Note: Denotes a main invitee attending the event.) S Surrogate (Note: Denotes a main invitee not attending the event, sending a surrogate in their place.) NI Not invited I Invited A Absent invitee						
Date	Organizer(s)	Moderator(s)	PP	PSOE–A	Vox	PorA	Adelante	Audience	Ref.
4 May	RTVE	Xabier Fortes; Laura Clavero	P Moreno	P Montero	P Gavira	P Maíllo	P García	363,000 (15.2%)	
11 May	RTVA	Blanca Rodríguez; Fernando García	P Moreno	P Montero	P Gavira	P Maíllo	P García	522,000 (21.5%)	

== Opinion polls ==
The tables below list opinion polling results in reverse chronological order, showing the most recent first and using the dates when the survey fieldwork was done, as opposed to the date of publication. Where the fieldwork dates are unknown, the date of publication is given instead. The highest percentage figure in each polling survey is displayed with its background shaded in the leading party's colour. If a tie ensues, this is applied to the figures with the highest percentages. The "Lead" column on the right shows the percentage-point difference between the parties with the highest percentages in a poll.

=== Graphical summary ===
Local regression trend line of poll results from 19 June 2022 to 17 May 2026, with each line corresponding to a political party.

=== Voting intention estimates ===
The table below lists weighted voting intention estimates. Refusals are generally excluded from the party vote percentages, while question wording and the treatment of "don't know" responses and those not intending to vote may vary between polling organisations. When available, seat projections determined by the polling organisations are also displayed below (or in place of) the voting estimates in a smaller font; 55 seats were required for an absolute majority in the Parliament of Andalusia.

Color key:

Poll conducted after legal ban on opinion polls

Polling firm/Commissioner	Fieldwork date	Sample size	Turnout	PP	PSOE–A	Vox	PorA	Adelante Andalucía (2021)	CS	Podemos Andalusia	Sumar	SALF	Lead
2026 regional election	17 May 2026	—N/a	62.3	41.6; 53	22.8; 28	13.8; 15	6.3; 5	9.6; 8	–	(Note: Within PorA.)		2.5; 0	18.8
NC Report/La Razón	17 May 2026	?	?	? 56/59	? 26/27	? 14/15	? 5/7	? 4/5	–			–	?
PP	16 May 2026	?	?	45.0; 54/59	21.0; 24/26	15.0 ?	–	8.0 ?	–			–	24.0
SocioMétrica/El Español	12–16 May 2026	1,500	?	42.5; 54/56	20.0; 23/25	14.5; 14/17	8.1; 6/8	9.0; 7/9	–			2.7; 0	22.5
Sigma Dos/RTVA–FORTA	1–16 May 2026	9,050	?	44.8; 56/59	22.5; 26/29	13.2; 13/15	7.3; 5/6	6.8; 4/5	–			–	22.3
Data10/Okdiario	10–11 May 2026	1,500	?	43.1; 56	22.4; 27	14.1; 16	7.9; 5	7.0; 5	–			–	20.7
SocioMétrica/El Español	8–11 May 2026	1,200	?	42.8; 54/55	22.7; 27/28	14.4; 15/16	7.4; 5/6	6.9; 4/6	–			3.0; 0	20.1
Target Point/El Debate	6–9 May 2026	1,191	?	42.6; 54/56	21.9; 26/28	14.8; 15/17	7.1; 4/5	7.5; 5/6	–			–	20.7
Sigma Dos/El Mundo	4–9 May 2026	2,063	?	44.7; 55/58	24.7; 27/30	12.9; 13/14	7.5; 5/6	6.7; 4/5	–			–	20.0
EM-Analytics/Electomanía	1–9 May 2026	1,829	?	42.3; 54	21.2; 25	14.8; 17	8.8; 7	8.3; 6	–			1.9; 0	21.1
Celeste-Tel/Onda Cero	4–8 May 2026	1,000	57.2	43.7; 57	22.7; 27	13.6; 15	7.9; 6	6.4; 4	–			1.8; 0	21.0
IMOP/El Confidencial	4–8 May 2026	1,511	?	42.8; 54/56	21.0; 25/27	14.4; 17/19	7.8; 4/6	7.7; 4/6	–			2.0; 0	21.8
PP	7 May 2026	?	?	? 55/59	? 23/27	? 17	? 5	? 6	–			–	?
NC Report/La Razón	4–7 May 2026	1,000	58.1	43.9; 58	22.8; 28	13.7; 15	7.6; 5	5.9; 3	–			–	21.1
GAD3/Vocento	30 Apr–7 May 2026	1,142	?	42.3; 54/56	21.7; 26/28	14.6; 15/17	7.8; 5	7.9; 6	–			–	20.6
40dB/Prisa	4–6 May 2026	1,200	?	43.3; 54/57	23.0; 27/29	13.8; 14/16	8.1; 6/7	6.5; 4/5	–			1.9; 0	20.3
Hamalgama Métrica/Vozpópuli	30 Apr–6 May 2026	1,000	?	43.5; 56	23.4; 28	14.6; 16	8.5; 6	5.9; 3	–			–	20.1
GESOP/Prensa Ibérica	29 Apr–6 May 2026	802	?	40.9; 52/55	20.5; 24/27	16.3; 17/20	8.9; 6/8	7.0; 4/6	–			2.7; 0	20.4
EM-Analytics/Electomanía	15 Apr–3 May 2026	1,524	?	42.8; 55	23.0; 29	13.8; 14	8.8; 6	7.3; 5	–			1.8; 0	19.8
SocioMétrica/El Español	30 Apr–2 May 2026	1,200	?	43.1; 58	23.5; 27	13.6; 15	8.4; 7	5.2; 2	–			2.9; 0	19.6
Commentia/Grupo Joly	14–26 Apr 2026	2,408	60	40.9; 52/54	21.6; 26/28	17.5; 17/19	9.1; 4/6	7.1; 3/5	–			–	19.3
EM-Analytics/Electomanía	1–26 Apr 2026	1,944	?	42.1; 54	23.4; 28	14.1; 16	8.9; 6	7.2; 5	–			1.7; 0	18.7
Target Point/El Debate	20–23 Apr 2026	1,004	?	42.8; 55/56	21.6; 26/28	15.5; 17/18	7.6; 5/6	6.5; 3/4	–			–	21.2
Sigma Dos/El Mundo	14–23 Apr 2026	1,607	72.2	43.7; 55/57	23.5; 27/29	14.3; 14/16	8.7; 6/7	6.3; 3/4	–			1.2; 0	20.2
EM-Analytics/Electomanía	1–19 Apr 2026	1,327	?	41.4; 53	23.6; 28	14.5; 17	8.7; 6	7.1; 5	–			1.8; 0	17.8
CIS (Ateneo del Dato) (Note: Alternative projection based on raw CIS data.)	10–18 Apr 2026	8,017	?	46.4; 56/62	21.8; 24/27	12.5; 13/15	6.0; 3/5	8.6; 5/8	–			2.0; 0	24.6
CIS	10–18 Apr 2026	8,017	?	43.6; 51/59	25.8; 27/34	10.3; 8/17	6.9; 4/5	8.5; 5/7	–			1.9; 0	17.8
GAD3/Vocento	13–16 Apr 2026	1,001	?	44.1; 56/58	23.5; 28/29	13.3; 13/14	7.6; 6	6.1; 4	–			–	20.6
CENTRA/CEA	27 Mar–16 Apr 2026	8,000	59.9	42.4; 53/56	20.1; 25/27	14.4; 17/19	7.9; 4/7	6.9; 5	–			2.0; 0	22.3
EM-Analytics/Electomanía	20 Mar–12 Apr 2026	1,584	?	41.3; 53	23.6; 28	14.4; 16	8.1; 6	7.8; 6	–			1.7; 0	17.7
IMOP/El Confidencial	6–10 Apr 2026	1,056	?	42.0; 53/55	23.2; 27/29	15.4; 18/20	6.9; 4/5	6.2; 3/4	–			1.6; 0	18.8
Sigma Dos/El Mundo	6–10 Apr 2026	1,596	68.9	42.8; 55/57	22.9; 27/29	15.6; 17/19	8.1; 5/6	5.7; 2	–			1.2; 0	19.9
EM-Analytics/Electomanía	20 Mar–5 Apr 2026	1,042	?	42.5; 53	24.0; 28	14.9; 17	8.5; 6	7.1; 5	0.2; 0			–	18.5
Target Point/El Debate	26–28 Mar 2026	1,003	?	42.5; 55/56	21.2; 26/27	17.7; 19/21	5.9; 4	6.1; 3/4	–			–	21.3
SocioMétrica/El Español	26–28 Mar 2026	1,200	?	42.8; 56	23.1; 28	16.1; 18	5.9; 4	6.3; 3	–			2.0; 0	19.7
GAD3/Vocento	24–27 Mar 2026	1,002	?	43.6; 54/57	23.8; 29/30	13.6; 14/15	6.7; 5	6.1; 4/5	–			–	19.8
NC Report/La Razón	23–27 Mar 2026	1,000	57.9	43.1; 57	23.8; 28	14.9; 16	8.4; 6	5.7; 2	–			–	19.3
CIS (Ateneo del Dato)	12–26 Mar 2026	6,016	?	45.6; 55/61	21.0; 22/27	13.3; 13/15	6.9; 5	9.0; 7/8	–			1.8; 0	24.6
Data10/Okdiario	24 Mar 2026	1,500	?	43.3; 54	20.1; 25	18.5; 22	6.7; 5	6.2; 3	–			–	23.2
EM-Analytics/Electomanía	28 Feb–22 Mar 2026	1,217	?	42.5; 54	23.5; 28	14.5; 16	9.0; 6	7.2; 5	0.2; 0			–	19.0
CENTRA/CEA	27 Feb–12 Mar 2026	3,600	56.3	42.8; 54/57	21.0; 26/27	15.0; 17/20	7.8; 5/6	6.3; 2/3	–			2.1; 0	21.8
GESOP/Prensa Ibérica	18–25 Feb 2026	801	?	38.5; 50/53	20.0; 23/27	20.0; 23/27	6.2; 4/5	5.5; 2/4	–	2.9; 0		2.8; 0	18.5
Sigma Dos/El Mundo	16–25 Feb 2026	1,393	?	40.4; 53/55	20.8; 24/27	18.0; 20/21	9.2; 5/7	6.9; 6/9	–			1.2; 0	19.6
Social Data/Grupo Viva	2–13 Feb 2026	2,400	?	42.7; 53/57	19.4; 24/27	17.6; 19/22	5.8; 2/4	7.6; 2/5	–			–	23.3
CENTRA/CEA	17–18 Nov 2025	3,600	54.9	40.2; 53/55	21.4; 25/28	17.5; 19/22	7.5; 5/6	6.1; 2/3	–			–	18.8
SocioMétrica/El Español	6–9 Oct 2025	1,200	?	42.9; 55	26.2; 32	14.4; 15	7.3; 5	4.4; 2	–			–	16.7
NC Report/La Razón	26 Sep–9 Oct 2025	1,000	55.1	42.3; 57/59	21.8; 26/28	? 16/17	? 5	? 3	–			–	20.5
CENTRA/CEA	15 Sep–1 Oct 2025	3,600	54.7	40.7; 54/56	23.3; 26/29	15.9; 16/18	8.0; 6/8	6.4; 2/3	–			–	17.4
CENTRA/CEA	13 Jun–1 Jul 2025	3,600	57.5	41.7; 55/57	19.8; 24/26	14.7; 16/18	10.0; 8/9	6.2; 2/3	–			–	21.9
GAD3/ABC	3–10 Jun 2025	804	?	43.3; 55/57	24.2; 28/29	15.4; 16/18	7.5; 5	4.8; 2	–			–	19.1
NC Report/La Razón	16–31 May 2025	500	?	? 59	? 28	? 14	? 6	? 2	–			–	?
EM-Analytics/Electomanía	27 Mar–28 Apr 2025	1,600	?	45.0; 58	25.5; 32	11.1; 12	6.3; 4	6.3; 3	0.2; 0			–	19.5
CENTRA/CEA	17 Mar–3 Apr 2025	3,600	59.5	42.2; 57/59	23.0; 25/28	14.3; 15/16	8.5; 6/9	3.8; 1/2	–			–	19.2
SocioMétrica/El Español	24–26 Feb 2025	1,500	?	45.5; 57	29.9; 35	11.4; 12	6.5; 5	3.2; 0	–			–	15.6
Sigma Dos/El Mundo	10–25 Feb 2025	1,464	?	43.9; 57/59	24.6; 29/31	12.5; 12/13	8.1; 6	4.8; 2/3	–			2.5; 0	19.3
NC Report/La Razón	15–23 Jan 2025	1,000	57.7	44.3; 59/60	22.2; 28/29	13.7; 14/15	7.4; 5	4.4; 2	–			2.8; 0	22.1
Sigma Dos/El Mundo	25 Nov–4 Dec 2024	1,402	?	42.2; 55/57	22.9; 28/29	13.3; 13/14	10.5; 9/10	4.9; 2	–			2.7; 0	19.3
CENTRA/CEA	20–29 Nov 2024	3,600	62.4	43.5; 57/59	21.4; 26/27	13.3; 13/15	7.5; 6/8	4.1; 2/3	–			3.7; 0/2	22.1
Social Data/Grupo Viva	13–22 Nov 2024	2,400	?	43.1; 54/59	24.8; 27/34	14.8; 13/18	7.0; 5/6	4.8; 2/3	–	1.9; 0		–	18.3
Data10/OKDiario	20–21 Nov 2024	1,500	?	44.4; 59	24.4; 29	14.9; 15	8.6; 6	2.8; 0	–			–	20.0
CENTRA/CEA	16–30 Sep 2024	3,600	59.9	41.8; 56/58	27.1; 30/32	11.1; 12/13	8.6; 6/7	4.3; 1/2	–			2.7; 0	14.7
CENTRA/CEA	18 Jun–2 Jul 2024	3,600	57.1	41.6; 57/59	23.5; 30/31	12.0; 12/13	10.2; 7/8	3.9; 0/1	1.2; 0			2.4; 0	18.1
2024 EP election	9 Jun 2024	—N/a	43.6	37.9 (48)	32.2 (40)	10.9 (12)	(Note: Within Sumar.)	–	0.7 (0)	2.8 (0)	5.1 (4)	6.2 (5)	5.7
CENTRA/CEA	22 Mar–9 Apr 2024	3,632	52.6	46.1; 58/61	21.2; 24/27	13.8; 14/17	8.6; 7/8	3.3; 0/1	2.0; 0			–	24.9
Sigma Dos/OKDiario	28 Feb 2024	?	?	46.4; 59	24.5; 29	10.2; 10	10.5; 9	5.1; 2	–			–	21.9
CENTRA/CEA	12–22 Dec 2023	3,600	55.0	46.2; 60/62	21.0; 25/27	12.7; 11/12	11.9; 10	3.8; 0/1	1.5; 0			–	25.2
CENTRA/CEA	11–21 Sep 2023	3,600	59.8	41.4; 56/58	24.7; 30/32	11.7; 9/10	12.6; 10/12	4.8; 0/2	1.3; 0			–	16.7
2023 general election	23 Jul 2023	—N/a	66.6	36.4 (45)	33.5 (38)	15.3 (16)		0.2 (0)	–		12.0 (10)	–	2.9
CENTRA/CEA	12–23 Jun 2023	3,600	58.9	44.6; 58/59	24.1; 30/31	12.5; 12/13	8.5; 5/6	5.3; 2	1.6; 0		–	–	20.5
CENTRA/CEA	7–21 Mar 2023	3,600	56.7	42.2; 56/57	24.2; 30/31	13.4; 12/13	8.5; 8/9	3.3; 1	4.2; 0		–	–	18.0
EM-Analytics/Electomanía	1 Jan–13 Feb 2023	854	?	46.0; 60	23.4; 28	11.2; 13	8.0; 6	4.7; 2	3.0; 0		–	–	22.6
CENTRA/CEA	21 Nov–2 Dec 2022	3,600	58.0	42.3; 56/58	19.4; 22/23	12.8; 13/14	11.9; 12/13	5.4; 3/4	3.1; 0		–	–	22.9
CENTRA/CEA	13–26 Sep 2022	3,600	53.2	45.5; 58/60	21.1; 27/28	11.5; 10/11	11.4; 10/11	4.9; 1/2	2.3; 0		–	–	24.4
2022 regional election	19 Jun 2022	—N/a	55.9	43.1; 58	24.1; 30	13.5; 14	7.7; 5	4.6; 2	3.3; 0		–	–	19.0

=== Voting preferences ===
The table below lists raw, unweighted voting preferences.

Polling firm/Commissioner	Fieldwork date	Sample size	PP	PSOE–A	Vox	PorA	Adelante Andalucía (2021)	CS	Podemos Andalusia	Sumar	SALF	Question	X mark	Lead
2026 regional election (Note: Does not include non-resident citizens.)	17 May 2026	—N/a	26.7	14.6	8.9	4.1	6.2	–			1.6	—N/a	35.2	12.1
40dB/Prisa	4–6 May 2026	1,200	28.7	18.1	13.2	7.2	6.2	–			3.3	13.4	4.3	10.6
GESOP/Prensa Ibérica	29 Apr–6 May 2026	802	26.7	18.7	12.8	6.7	5.8	–			2.0	15.5	3.7	8.0
CIS	10–18 Apr 2026	8,017	36.9	22.1	8.0	5.6	7.2	–			1.4	13.0	1.8	14.8
CENTRA/CEA	27 Mar–16 Apr 2026	8,000	36.0	19.6	7.2	8.1	8.0	–			1.8	10.3	3.4	16.4
IMOP/El Confidencial	6–10 Apr 2026	1,056	39.8	25.5	?	7.6	6.8	–			–	–	–	14.3
Target Point/El Debate	26–28 Mar 2026	1,003	26.5	15.2	10.2	–	–	–			–	25.1	7.3	11.3
CIS	12–26 Mar 2026	6,016	32.1	22.0	8.8	5.8	7.7	–	0.5		1.3	14.8	2.8	10.1
CENTRA/CEA	27 Feb–12 Mar 2026	3,600	29.8	18.7	9.5	9.4	6.0	1.0			1.9	6.5	6.4	11.1
GESOP/Prensa Ibérica	18–25 Feb 2026	801	25.2	16.1	13.2	4.7	3.4	–	2.2		1.8	20.3	4.8	9.1
CENTRA/CEA	17–18 Nov 2025	3,600	23.8	18.6	12.9	7.4	6.8	1.1			1.8	8.0	7.2	5.2
SocioMétrica/El Español	6–9 Oct 2025	1,200	28.7	21.6	12.3	7.6	3.9	–			–	11.2	6.5	7.1
CENTRA/CEA	15 Sep–1 Oct 2025	3,600	30.3	19.2	10.8	8.5	5.2	1.4			1.1	7.0	8.0	11.1
CENTRA/CEA	13 Jun–1 Jul 2025	3,600	30.5	16.4	10.4	9.2	5.4	1.3			0.5	3.5	10.2	14.1
CENTRA/CEA	17 Mar–3 Apr 2025	3,600	32.4	20.4	12.0	8.0	2.3	2.2			1.2	4.7	11.1	12.0
CIS	7–31 Mar 2025	2,966	32.4	22.9	7.3	4.1	1.7	–	2.2		0.8	20.0	3.6	9.5
CENTRA/CEA	20–29 Nov 2024	3,600	32.8	16.1	7.7	8.0	3.1	1.3			2.5	8.8	10.6	16.7
CENTRA/CEA	16–30 Sep 2024	3,600	32.3	21.0	4.9	6.6	3.7	0.6			1.9	12.9	8.4	11.3
CENTRA/CEA	18 Jun–2 Jul 2024	3,600	31.6	20.0	7.6	8.5	2.6	0.8			2.5	7.4	9.1	11.6
2024 EP election	9 Jun 2024	—N/a	17.0	14.4	4.9		–	0.3	1.3	2.3	2.8	—N/a	54.7	2.6
CENTRA/CEA	22 Mar–9 Apr 2024	3,632	29.7	13.4	8.0	5.5	1.1	0.6			–	22.7	10.0	16.3
CENTRA/CEA	12–22 Dec 2023	3,600	43.3	14.4	8.3	8.4	2.7	0.7			–	9.1	6.3	28.9
CENTRA/CEA	11–21 Sep 2023	3,600	35.9	19.5	5.9	10.8	3.8	1.0			–	6.5	6.5	16.4
2023 general election	23 Jul 2023	—N/a	24.8	22.8	10.4		0.1	–		8.1	–	—N/a	31.0	2.0
CENTRA/CEA	12–23 Jun 2023	3,600	37.9	20.8	7.3	8.0	3.6	1.4		–	–	9.1	4.5	17.1
CENTRA/CEA	7–21 Mar 2023	3,600	32.5	22.1	10.0	7.7	2.7	3.8		–	–	4.0	9.5	10.4
CENTRA/CEA	21 Nov–2 Dec 2022	3,600	32.8	12.6	8.5	9.2	5.7	2.4		–	–	6.7	8.4	20.2
CENTRA/CEA	13–26 Sep 2022	3,600	36.6	14.9	6.7	9.0	3.9	1.8		–	–	11.2	6.9	21.7
2022 regional election	19 Jun 2022	—N/a	24.9	13.9	7.8	4.4	2.6	1.9		–	–	—N/a	41.6	11.0

=== Victory preferences ===
The table below lists opinion polling on the victory preferences for each party in the event of a regional election taking place.

Polling firm/Commissioner	Fieldwork date	Sample size	PP	PSOE–A	Vox	PorA	Adelante Andalucía (2021)	SALF	Other/ None	Question	Lead
CENTRA/CEA	27 Mar–16 Apr 2026	8,000	38.4	21.2	7.6	6.2	9.4	1.6	8.2	7.6	17.2

=== Preferred President ===
The table below lists opinion polling on leader preferences to become president of the Regional Government of Andalusia.

All candidates

Polling firm/Commissioner	Fieldwork date	Sample size										Other/ None/ Not care	Question	Lead
Polling firm/Commissioner	Fieldwork date	Sample size	Moreno PP	Montero PSOE–A	Gavira Vox	Nieto PorA	Maíllo PorA	Gómez PorA	García AA	Delgado Podemos	Yacar SALF	Other/ None/ Not care	Question	Lead
IMOP/El Confidencial	4–8 May 2026	1,511	39.3	20.1	7.7	–	7.9	–	8.4	–	–	16.6		19.2
GAD3/Vocento	30 Apr–7 May 2026	1,142	50.0	19.0	6.0	–	6.0	–	7.0	–	–	12.0		31.0
40dB/Prisa	4–6 May 2026	1,200	37.1	16.7	10.8	–	8.6	–	7.9	–	2.6	8.8	7.4	20.4
GESOP/Prensa Ibérica	29 Apr–6 May 2026	802	39.2	18.6	4.2	–	6.3	–	4.7	–	–	11.9	15.0	20.6
SocioMétrica/El Español	30 Apr–2 May 2026	1,200	38.1	15.1	9.7	–	4.8	–	5.3	–	2.9	24.0	–	23.0
CIS	10–18 Apr 2026	8,017	43.8	20.7	5.6	–	6.6	–	6.9	–	1.0 (Note: Includes responses denoting both Alvise Pérez and a party's generic candidate.)	6.2	9.2	23.1
CENTRA/CEA	27 Mar–16 Apr 2026	8,000	49.6	21.4	4.0	–	9.6	–	7.0	–	–	2.6	5.7	28.2
SocioMétrica/El Español	26–28 Mar 2026	1,100	48.6	17.6	14.9	–	8.1	–	8.1	2.7	–	–	–	31.0
GAD3/Vocento	24–27 Mar 2026	1,002	56.0	17.0	4.0	–	6.0	–	5.0	–	–	10.0	2.0	39.0
CIS	12–26 Mar 2026	6,016	40.9	17.5	4.6	–	5.6	–	5.5	0.3	–	10.7	15.0	23.4
CENTRA/CEA	27 Feb–12 Mar 2026	3,600	39.9	17.6	2.7	–	6.5	–	4.8	0.2	–	7.0	21.3	22.3
Social Data/Grupo Viva	2–13 Feb 2026	2,400	50.0	15.6	7.2	–	5.1	–	6.1	–	–	16.0	–	34.4
CENTRA/CEA	17–18 Nov 2025	3,600	33.1	19.4	4.4	–	–	1.3	7.1	–	–	10.3	24.3	13.7
SocioMétrica/El Español	6–9 Oct 2025	1,200	33.9	16.3	10.8	3.3	–	–	4.6	–	–	–	31.1	17.6
CENTRA/CEA	15 Sep–1 Oct 2025	3,600	38.8	20.0	3.4	3.8	–	–	3.3	–	–	5.2	25.6	18.8
CENTRA/CEA	13 Jun–1 Jul 2025	3,600	49.4	21.5	4.7	6.7	9.2	–	5.0	–	–	2.2	1.3	27.9
GAD3/ABC	3–10 Jun 2025	804	42.0	20.0	7.0	–	6.0	–	3.0	–	–	14.0	5.0	22.0
CIS (Note: Responses denoting a party's generic candidate are aggregated to that party's main candidate/leader at the time of the poll.)	7–31 Mar 2025	2,966	36.3	13.0	3.7	2.9	0.7	–	–	–	–	4.6	38.8	23.3
SocioMétrica/El Español	24–26 Feb 2025	1,500	35.1	15.1	8.8	4.2	5.8	–	–	–	–	–	31.0	20.0

Moreno vs. Montero

Polling firm/Commissioner	Fieldwork date	Sample size			Other/ None/ Not care	Question	Lead
Polling firm/Commissioner	Fieldwork date	Sample size	Moreno PP	Montero PSOE–A	Other/ None/ Not care	Question	Lead
SocioMétrica/El Español	6–9 Oct 2025	1,200	48.8	26.0	–	25.3	22.8
SocioMétrica/El Español	24–26 Feb 2025	1,500	45.9	28.1	–	26.0	17.8

=== Predicted President ===
The table below lists opinion polling on the perceived likelihood for each leader to become president of the Regional Government of Andalusia.

Polling firm/Commissioner	Fieldwork date	Sample size			Other/ None/ Not care	Question	Lead
Polling firm/Commissioner	Fieldwork date	Sample size	Moreno PP	Montero PSOE–A	Other/ None/ Not care	Question	Lead
SocioMétrica/El Español	6–9 Oct 2025	1,200	58.5	18.3	–	23.2	40.2
SocioMétrica/El Español	24–26 Feb 2025	1,500	56.9	19.8	–	23.3	37.1

== Voter turnout ==
The table below shows registered voter turnout during the election. Figures for election day do not include non-resident citizens, while final figures do.

Province	Time (Election day)												Final		
Province	11:30			14:00			18:00			20:00			Final		
Province	2022	2026	+/–	2022	2026	+/–	2022	2026	+/–	2022	2026	+/–	2022	2026	+/–
Almería	16.51%	16.68%	+0.17	32.23%	36.80%	+4.57	41.77%	50.36%	+8.59	55.96%	62.44%	+6.48	51.31%	57.02%	+5.71
Cádiz	13.56%	13.58%	+0.02	31.16%	34.44%	+3.28	41.36%	48.63%	+7.27	53.08%	60.11%	+7.03	51.54%	58.37%	+6.83
Córdoba	17.35%	16.48%	−0.87	38.92%	40.51%	+1.59	48.48%	55.12%	+6.64	62.51%	68.84%	+6.33	60.79%	66.93%	+6.14
Granada	16.82%	16.07%	−0.75	34.93%	38.20%	+3.27	44.47%	53.54%	+9.07	59.61%	66.31%	+6.70	55.65%	61.82%	+6.17
Huelva	12.22%	13.24%	+1.02	29.80%	34.32%	+4.52	39.89%	48.10%	+8.21	54.93%	62.22%	+7.29	53.86%	61.01%	+7.15
Jaén	16.97%	15.64%	−1.33	37.88%	39.26%	+1.38	47.21%	53.82%	+6.61	63.65%	68.61%	+4.96	62.09%	66.90%	+4.81
Málaga	15.62%	15.03%	−0.59	32.98%	35.66%	+2.68	43.59%	50.66%	+7.07	56.21%	62.40%	+6.19	53.68%	59.35%	+5.67
Seville	15.08%	14.95%	−0.13	35.51%	38.79%	+3.28	46.78%	54.82%	+8.04	60.98%	67.69%	+6.71	59.52%	66.20%	+6.68
Total	15.44%	15.10%	−0.34	34.24%	37.25%	+3.01	44.51%	52.16%	+7.65	58.36%	64.84%	+6.48	56.13%	62.30%	+6.17

== Results ==
=== Overall ===
← Summary of the 17 May 2026 Parliament of Andalusia election results
Parties and alliances	Popular vote			Seats	
Parties and alliances	Votes	%	±pp	Total	+/−
People's Party (PP)	1,744,728	41.56	−1.55	53	−5
Spanish Socialist Workers' Party of Andalusia (PSOE–A)	955,584	22.76	−1.34	28	−2
Vox (Vox)	580,293	13.82	+0.35	15	+1
Forward Andalusia (Adelante Andalucía)	403,560	9.61	+5.03	8	+6
For Andalusia (IU–Podemos–MS–IdPA–VQ–ALTER–AV)	266,213	6.34	−1.36	5	±0
The Party is Over (SALF)	106,322	2.53	New	0	±0
Animalist Party with the Environment (PACMA)^{1}	25,374	0.60	−0.35	0	±0
100x100 United (100x100)	14,786	0.35	New	0	±0
Andalusians–Andalusian People (Andalucistas–PA)^{2}	12,157	0.29	−0.03	0	±0
Blank Seats to Leave Empty Seats (EB)	9,347	0.22	+0.10	0	±0
Jaén Deserves More (JM+)	7,993	0.19	−0.32	0	±0
Communist Party of the Andalusian People (PCPA)	5,716	0.14	+0.02	0	±0
Spanish Phalanx of the CNSO (FE de las JONS)	4,995	0.12	+0.08	0	±0
For a Fairer World (M+J)	4,790	0.11	+0.02	0	±0
Self-employed Party (Partido Autónomos)	3,752	0.09	+0.03	0	±0
Andalusian Nation (NA)	3,004	0.07	±0.00	0	±0
Huelva Exists (HE>)	2,148	0.05	New	0	±0
Communist Party of the Workers of Spain (PCTE)	1,792	0.04	−0.04	0	±0
Andalusian Power (Poder Andaluz)	1,084	0.03	New	0	±0
Malagenian Alternative (29)	768	0.02	New	0	±0
People from Almería–Regionalists for Almería (ALM)	680	0.02	New	0	±0
Andalusi Party (Andalusí)	538	0.01	New	0	±0
Revolutionary Anticapitalist Left (IZAR)	528	0.01	±0.00	0	±0
Retirees Party for the Future. Dignity and Democracy (JUFUDI)	428	0.01	±0.00	0	±0
Left for Almería (IPAL)	383	0.01	New	0	±0
Connect Andalusia (Conecta)	339	0.01	New	0	±0
United Society (Sociedad Unida)	237	0.01	New	0	±0
Blank ballots	40,694	0.97	−0.03		
Total	4,198,233			109	±0
Valid votes	4,198,233	98.91	+0.03		
Invalid votes	46,181	1.09	−0.03		
Votes cast / turnout	4,244,414	62.30	+6.17		
Abstentions	2,568,462	37.70	−6.17		
Registered voters	6,812,876				
Sources
Footnotes: ^{1} Animalist Party with the Environment results are compared to Animalist Party Against Mistreatment of Animals totals in the 2022 election.; ^{2} Andalusians–Andalusian People results are compared to Arise Andalusians Coalition in the 2022 election.

Popular vote
PP	41.56%
PSOE–A	22.76%
Vox	13.82%
AA	9.61%
PorA	6.34%
SALF	2.53%
Others	2.40%
Blank ballots	0.97%

Seats
PP	48.62%
PSOE–A	25.69%
Vox	13.76%
AA	7.34%
PorA	4.59%

=== Distribution by constituency ===
Constituency	PP		PSOE–A		Vox		AA		PorA	
Constituency	%	S	%	S	%	S	%	S	%	S
Almería	42.7	6	21.7	3	23.2	3	3.1	−	3.8	−
Cádiz	38.9	7	20.2	3	13.0	2	14.3	2	5.3	1
Córdoba	43.2	6	22.3	3	12.6	1	8.3	1	8.8	1
Granada	42.4	6	24.3	3	15.1	2	6.8	1	6.5	1
Huelva	40.8	5	25.2	3	14.9	2	8.0	1	5.6	−
Jaén	43.7	6	27.3	4	13.6	1	4.4	−	5.1	−
Málaga	44.0	9	20.0	4	14.6	2	9.3	1	6.0	1
Seville	39.4	8	24.0	5	10.8	2	12.9	2	7.5	1
Total	41.6	53	22.8	28	13.8	15	9.6	8	6.3	5

== Aftermath ==
=== Government formation ===
Investiture; Nomination of Juanma Moreno (PP)
Ballot →	30 June 2026	2 July 2026
Required majority →	55 out of 109	Simple
Yes: • PP (53); • Vox (15) (on 2 Jul)	53 / 109	68 / 109
No: • PSOE–A (28); • Vox (15) (on 30 Jun); • AA (8); • PorA (5)	56 / 109	41 / 109
Abstentions	0 / 109	0 / 109
Absentees	0 / 109	0 / 109

== Bibliography ==
- Ley Orgánica 5/1985, de 19 de junio, del Régimen Electoral General (Organic Law 5/1985). Official State Gazette (in Spanish). 19 June 1985 [version as of 14 July 2025]. BOE-A-1985-11672.
- Ley 1/1986, de 2 de enero, Electoral de Andalucía (Law 1/1986). Official State Gazette (in Spanish). 2 January 1986 [version as of 24 December 2019]. BOE-A-1986-2788.
- Ley 6/2006, de 24 de octubre, del Gobierno de la Comunidad Autónoma de Andalucía (Law 6/2006). Official State Gazette (in Spanish). 24 October 2006 [version as of 16 February 2024]. BOE-A-2006-20848.
- Ley Orgánica 2/2007, de 19 de marzo, de reforma del Estatuto de Autonomía para Andalucía (Organic Law 2/2007). Official State Gazette (in Spanish). 19 March 2007 [version as of 28 December 2022]. BOE-A-2007-5825.
- Decreto del Presidente 2/2026, de 23 de marzo, de disolución del Parlamento de Andalucía y de convocatoria de elecciones (PDF) (Decree 2/2026). Official Gazette of the Regional Government of Andalusia (in Spanish). 23 March 2026. 00335347.
