= María Jesús Montero =

Spanish politician (born 1966)

The Most Excellent María Jesús Montero
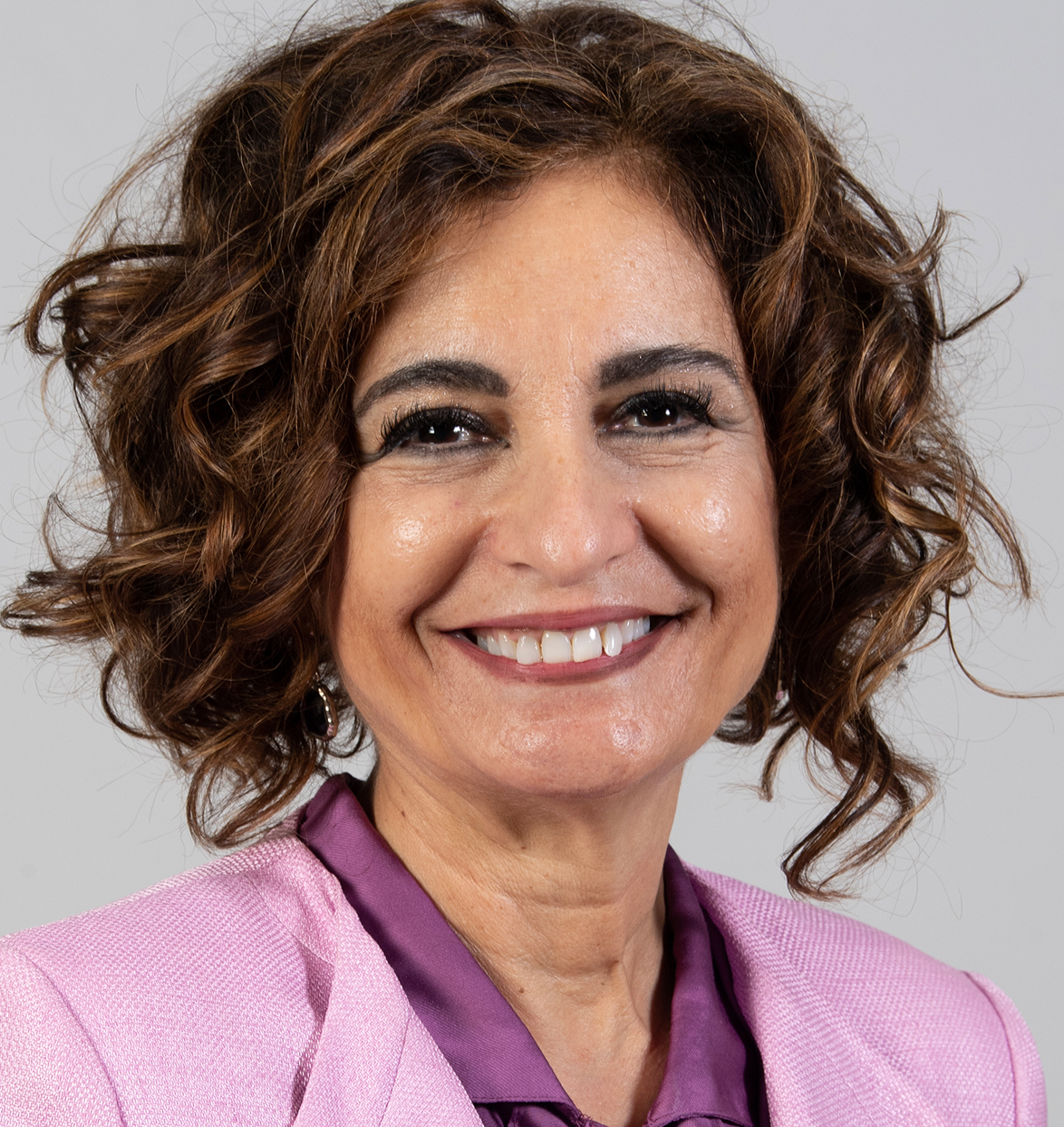
- Official portrait, 2023

First Deputy Prime Minister of Spain
- In office 29 December 2023 – 27 March 2026 Serving with Yolanda Díaz and Sara Aagesen
- Monarch: Felipe VI
- Prime Minister: Pedro Sánchez
- Preceded by: Nadia Calviño
- Succeeded by: Carlos Cuerpo

Minister of Finance of Spain (Note: Minister of Finance from 2018 to 2021, Minister of Finance and Civil Service from 2021 to 2023 and again Minister of Finance from 2023.)
- In office 7 June 2018 – 27 March 2026
- Prime Minister: Pedro Sánchez
- Preceded by: Cristóbal Montoro (Finance); Miquel Iceta (Civil Service)
- Succeeded by: José Luis Escrivá (Civil Service); Arcadi España (Finance)

Fourth Deputy Prime Minister of Spain
- In office 21 November 2023 – 29 December 2023 Serving with Nadia Calviño, Yolanda Díaz and Teresa Ribera
- Monarch: Felipe VI
- Prime Minister: Pedro Sánchez
- Preceded by: Teresa Ribera (2021)
- Succeeded by: Office abolished

Deputy Secretary-General of the Spanish Socialist Workers' Party
- Incumbent
- Assumed office 23 July 2022
- Secretary-General: Pedro Sánchez
- Preceded by: Adriana Lastra

Spokesperson of the Government of Spain
- In office 13 January 2020 – 12 July 2021
- Prime Minister: Pedro Sánchez
- Preceded by: Isabel Celaá
- Succeeded by: Isabel Rodríguez García

Regional Minister of Finance and Public Administrations of Andalusia
- In office 10 September 2013 – 6 June 2018
- President: Susana Díaz
- Preceded by: Carmen Martinez Aguayo
- Succeeded by: Antonio Ramírez de Arellano López (Economy, Finance and Public Administrations)

Regional Minister of Health and Social Welfare of Andalusia
- In office 7 May 2012 – 10 September 2013
- President: José Antonio Griñán
- Preceded by: Herself (Health and Consumer Affairs); Micaela Navarro (Equality and Social Welfare)
- Succeeded by: María José Sánchez Rubio (Health and Social Policies)

Regional Minister of Health and Consumer Affairs of Andalusia
- In office 25 April 2004 – 7 May 2012
- President: Manuel Chaves (2004–2009); José Antonio Griñán (2009–2012)
- Preceded by: Francisco Vallejo Serrano
- Succeeded by: Herself (Health and Social Welfare)

Member of the Congress of Deputies
- In office 3 December 2019 – 11 June 2026
- In office 21 May 2019 – 24 September 2019
- Constituency: Seville

Member of the Parliament of Andalusia
- Incumbent
- Assumed office 11 June 2026
- In office 9 September 2013 – 6 June 2018
- In office 3 April 2008 – 18 April 2012
- Constituency: Seville

Secretary-General of the Spanish Socialist Workers' Party of Andalusia
- Incumbent
- Assumed office 22 February 2025
- President: Fuensanta Coves
- Preceded by: Juan Espadas

Personal details
- Born: 4 February 1966 (age 60) Seville, Spanish State
- Party: Spanish Socialist Workers' Party
- Spouse: Rafael Ibáñez Reche
- Children: 2
- Education: University of Seville; EADA Business School
- Occupation: Hospital administrator and politician

María Jesús Montero Cuadrado (pronounced [maˈɾi.a xeˈsus monˈteɾo]; born 4 February 1966) is a Spanish hospital administrator and politician currently serving as Senator and Member of the Parliament of Andalucia since 2026. At party level, she serves as Deputy Secretary-General of the Spanish Socialist Workers' Party (PSOE) since 2022 and as Secretary-General of the Andalusia PSOE's branch since 2025.

Montero has held important political positions throughout her career. Between 2018 and 2026 she served as Minister of Finance, as Government Spokesperson from 2020 to 2021 and as Deputy Prime Minister from 2023 until her resignation. She also served as Member of the Congress of Deputies representing Seville from 2019 to 2026. Prior to that, between 2004 and 2018, she served as regional minister in different portfolios of the Regional Government of Andalusia.

== Education and early career ==
The daughter of teachers, Montero has a Degree in Medicine and Surgery from the University of Seville and master's degree in management from the EADA Business School in Barcelona.

At institutions like the Hospital Universitario Virgen del Rocío, Montero subsequently worked as a hospital administrator, holding various positions of responsibility throughout her career, mainly linked to the specialization of health management.

== Political career ==
Montero chaired the Committee on Marginalization of the Andalusia Youth Council between 1986 and 1988, and later, general secretary of the same until 1990.

Montero served as a Socialist deputy in the Parliament of Andalusia, representing the electoral constituency of Seville.

=== Regional Minister of Andalusia (2004–2018) ===
Between September 2002 and April 2004 Montero held the position of Deputy Minister of Health of the Junta de Andalucía, after which she was appointed head of the Regional Ministry of Health, a responsibility she held until May 2012, the date from which she assumed the Health portfolio and Social Welfare.

During Montero's tenure at the head of the Ministry of Health, new health rights were regulated, such as the second medical opinion, access to preimplantation genetic diagnosis, genetic counseling or dignified death. Also under her leadership, Andalusia defied a 2012 ban on free healthcare for undocumented immigrants, imposed by the central government as part of spending cuts to avoid an international bailout amid the European debt crisis.

In partnership with other institutions and the business sector, biomedical research has also been promoted, through a network of centers such as the Andalusian Center for Molecular Biology and Regenerative Medicine (CABIMER), the Institute of Biomedicine of Seville (IBIS), Center for genomics and oncology research (GENYO) or the Research Center for Innovative Medicines (MEDINA).

From 9 September 2013 to 6 June 2018, Montero served as Minister of Finance and Public Administration of the Junta de Andalucía. At the head of this department, developed and approved five budgets without an absolute majority in Parliament, one with Izquierda Unida and four with Citizens. Andalusia is currently one of the few communities that complies with the rules of budgetary stability and financial sustainability (goal of deficit, debt and expenditure rule), in addition to becoming the common system community that previously pays its suppliers. Likewise, during these years important regulatory advances have been promoted in the Finance area, such as the decree of payment terms guarantees, with which the Junta de Andalucía self-imposed to reduce the maximum payment time in sectors to only 20 days. priority areas such as health, education and social services.

=== Government minister (2018–2026) ===
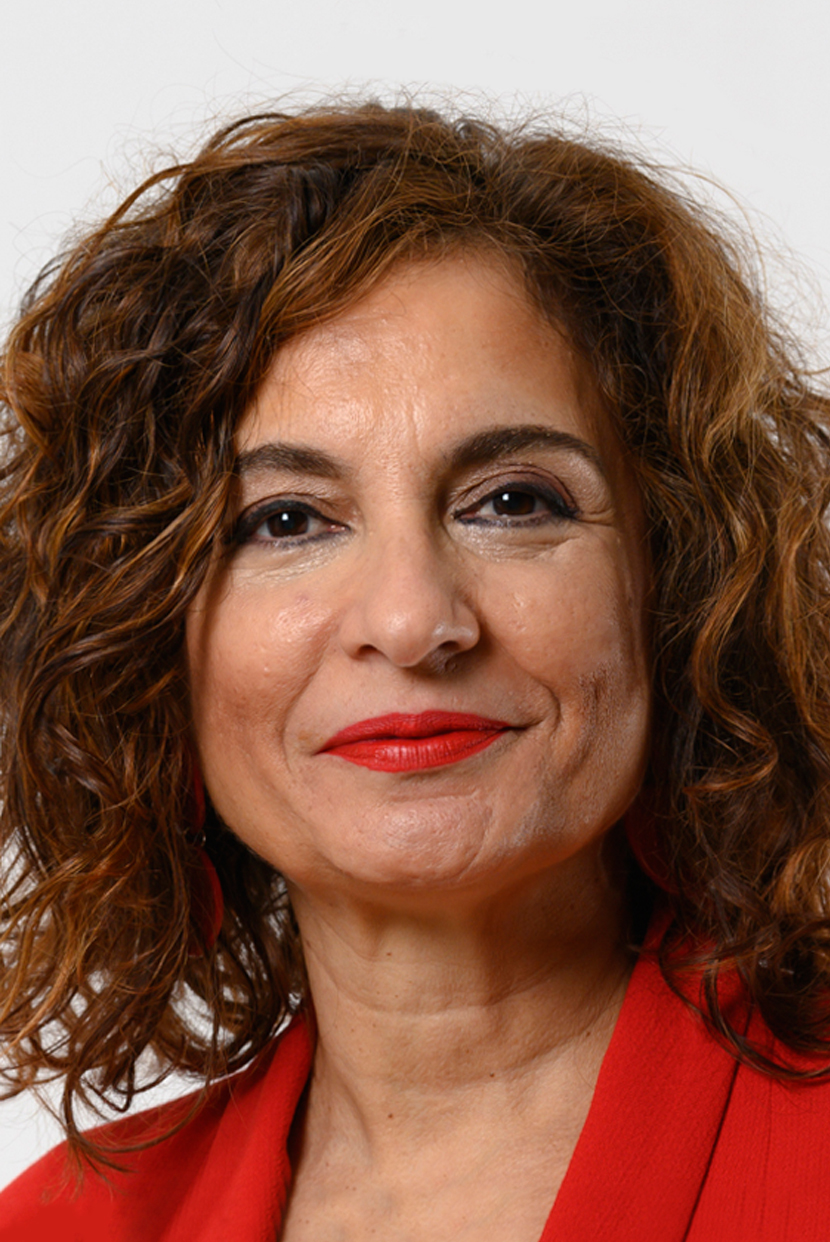
María Jesús Montero

Montero was chosen by prime minister Pedro Sánchez, following the motion of no confidence that the PSOE presented against the previous government of Mariano Rajoy (PP) and that was approved by the Congress of Deputies on 1 June 2018, to be Finance Minister in new Spanish cabinet. Felipe VI sanctioned by royal decree of June her appointment as the first female holder of the portfolio of Minister of Treasury of Spain. On 7 June she took office as Minister before the King at Palace of Zarzuela.

By January 2019, Montero presented her minority government's first budget proposal of 472.7 billion euro ($543 billion), promising to reduce its deficit to 1.3 percent of gross domestic product but also increase social spending by over 6 percent; the proposal failed to get parliamentary approval and instead prompted a snap election.

In early 2020, after the November general election of 2019, Montero was confirmed by the Prime Minister to continue in the Finance portfolio. In addition, she was appointed government spokeswoman.

Following recommendations from the International Monetary Fund (IMF) aimed at reviving the economy amid the COVID-19 pandemic in Spain, Montero led efforts in 2020 to suspend the constitutional commitment to any deficit targets for two years and allow the government to spend and borrow at will.

In 2021, Montero steered the government’s negotiations that resulted in the Chamber of Deputies approving a total central government budget of 196 billion euros –the biggest budget in the country's history–, after Prime Minister Sánchez had won the support of the Catalan pro-independence Republican Left of Catalonia. That year, she also reported that Spain's budget deficit had narrowed to 6.76% of gross domestic product from over 10% in 2020.

However, she failed on three occasions during the 2024–2026 period to comply with the constitutional mandate to present a budget to parliament for its approval, a fact that would be brought before the Constitutional Court by the Senate, with a majority of the People's Party, and which is pending resolution.

In March 2026, she left her government positions to run as a candidate in the 2026 Andalusian regional election.

=== Return to regional politics ===
In January 2025 she was proclaimed Secretary-General of the Spanish Socialist Workers' Party of Andalusia as no other candidate ultimately obtained the necessary endorsements. Her formal proclamation took place at the regional Congress held between February 22 and 24 of that year in Armilla, Granada.

Following the call for elections by Juanma Moreno for May 2026, Montero left her government posts—although she retained her seat in the Congress of Deputies—to focus on the election campaign.

== Political positions ==
In a letter sent to their counterparts in the European Commission – Pierre Moscovici and Miguel Arias Cañete – in May 2019, Montero and Environment Minister Teresa Ribera called on the European Union to assess a potential carbon tax on power imports to protect the bloc’s interests and help it to pursue its environmental targets amid growing public concern over climate change.
