= Benedicto Crespo-Facorro =

Spanish psychiatrist

- Born: Spain
- Education: Complutense University of Madrid
- Known for: Early psychosis research, schizophrenia, founder of PAFIP early intervention program
- Scientific career
- Fields: Psychiatry
- Workplaces: Hospital Universitario Virgen del Rocío, University of Seville; University of Milan; Baylor University; Universidad Favaloro

Benedicto Crespo Facorro is a psychiatrist and professor of psychiatry with the School of Medicine at the Hospital Universitario Virgen del Rocío, Universidad de Sevilla, in Seville. Facorro is notable for his research work in the area of early psychosis and schizophrenia and for having led one of the first early psychosis early intervention programs in Spain (PAFIP) for over two decades. Facorro is one of the only four researchers from Spain listed in the authors' collaborative network of the authors that published the greatest number of research papers on antipsychotics and schizophrenia over the last 50 years.

== Life ==
In 1997 Crespo-Facorro achieved a Doctor of Medicine with a doctorate in psychiatry from Complutense University. From 1997 to 2000 Crespo-Facorro worked as a postdoctoral researcher at the University of Iowa working on clinical and biological research on schizophrenia.

Crespo-Facorro is currently director of the Mental Health Department at Hospital Universitario Virgen del Rocío (Seville) (2019-), professor in the faculty of medicine at University of Seville, adjunct professor of psychiatry at University of Milan; and adjunct professor of psychiatry at Baylor University, Texas, US; and Honoris Causa Professor at the Universidad Favaloro Argentina.

From 2016 to 2021 was the coordinator of the National Schizophrenia Program of the Spanish Psychiatric Research Network (CIBERSAM). He is a Full Member of the Royal Academy of Medicine of Cantabria where he was Vice President and Scientific Director of the IIS Valdecilla-IDIVAL (Santander) (2017–2019).

== Editor ==
Crespo-Facorro is editor-in-chief of the Revista de Psiquiatria y Salud Mental.

== Selected publications ==
A list of Crespo-Facorro's most important papers:

- Tomasik, Jakub; Lago, Santiago G.; Vázquez-Bourgon, Javier; Papiol, Sergi; Suárez-Pinilla, Paula; Crespo-Facorro, Benedicto; Bahn, Sabine (1 August 2019). "Association of Insulin Resistance With Schizophrenia Polygenic Risk Score and Response to Antipsychotic Treatment". JAMA Psychiatry. 76 (8): 864–867. doi:10.1001/jamapsychiatry.2019.0304. PMC 6583823. PMID 30942838.
- Garrido-Torres, Nathalia; Rocha-Gonzalez, Idalino; Alameda, Luis; Rodriguez-Gangoso, Aurora; Vilches, Ana; Canal-Rivero, Manuel; Crespo-Facorro, Benedicto; Ruiz-Veguilla, Miguel (October 2021). "Metabolic syndrome in antipsychotic-naïve patients with first-episode psychosis: a systematic review and meta-analysis". Psychological Medicine. 51 (14): 2307–2320. doi:10.1017/S0033291721002853. PMID 34493353. S2CID 237441583.
- Ayesa-Arriola, Rosa; Miguel-Corredera, Margarita; de la Foz, Victor Ortiz-García; Neergaard, Karl D.; Correa-Ghisays, Patricia; Setién-Suero, Esther; Crespo-Facorro, Benedicto (6 May 2021). "Education and long-term outcomes in first episode psychosis: 10-year follow-up study of the PAFIP cohort". Psychological Medicine. 53 (1): 66–77. doi:10.1017/S0033291721001112. PMID 33952364. S2CID 233870057.
- Rodríguez-Sánchez, José Manuel; Setién-Suero, Esther; Suárez-Pinilla, Paula; Mayoral Van Son, Jaqueline; Vázquez-Bourgon, Javier; Gil López, Patxi; Crespo-Facorro, Benedicto; Ayesa-Arriola, Rosa (March 2022). "Ten-year course of cognition in first-episode non-affective psychosis patients: PAFIP cohort". Psychological Medicine. 52 (4): 770–779. doi:10.1017/S0033291720002408. PMID 32686636. S2CID 220654366.
- Ayesa-Arriola, Rosa; Ortíz-García de la Foz, Víctor; Martínez-García, Obdulia; Setién-Suero, Esther; Ramírez, María Luz; Suárez-Pinilla, Paula; Mayoral-van Son, Jacqueline; Vázquez-Bourgon, Javier; Juncal-Ruiz, María; Gómez-Revuelta, Marcos; Tordesillas-Gutiérrez, Diana; Crespo-Facorro, Benedicto (January 2021). "Dissecting the functional outcomes of first episode schizophrenia spectrum disorders: a 10-year follow-up study in the PAFIP cohort". Psychological Medicine. 51 (2): 264–277. doi:10.1017/S0033291719003179. PMID 31736458. S2CID 208143245.
- Sánchez-Hidalgo, Ana C.; Martín-Cuevas, Celia; Crespo-Facorro, Benedicto; Garrido-Torres, Nathalia (24 March 2022). "Reelin Alterations, Behavioral Phenotypes, and Brain Anomalies in Schizophrenia: A Systematic Review of Insights From Rodent Models". Frontiers in Neuroanatomy. 16 844737. doi:10.3389/fnana.2022.844737. PMC 8986979. PMID 35401125.
- Suárez-Pinilla, Paula; Suárez-Pinilla, Marta; Setién-Suero, Esther; Ortiz-García de la Foz, Víctor; Mayoral-Van Son, Jacqueline; Vázquez-Bourgon, Javier; Gómez-Revuelta, Marcos; Juncal-Ruíz, María; Ayesa-Arriola, Rosa; Crespo-Facorro, Benedicto (October 2021). "Stability of schizophrenia diagnosis in a 10-year longitudinal study on first episode of non-affective psychosis: Conclusions from the PAFIP cohort". Acta Psychiatrica Scandinavica. 144 (4): 342–357. doi:10.1111/acps.13344. PMID 34228812. S2CID 235759116.
- López-Díaz, Álvaro; Ayesa-Arriola, Rosa; Ortíz-García de la Foz, Víctor; Suárez-Pinilla, Paula; Ramírez-Bonilla, María Luz; Vázquez-Bourgon, Javier; Ruiz-Veguilla, Miguel; Crespo-Facorro, Benedicto (December 2021). "Predictors of diagnostic stability in brief psychotic disorders: Findings from a 3-year longitudinal study". Acta Psychiatrica Scandinavica. 144 (6): 578–588. doi:10.1111/acps.13364. PMID 34431080. S2CID 237291032.
- Ayesa-Arriola, R.; Setién-Suero, E.; Marques-Feixa, L.; Neergaard, K.; Butjosa, A.; Vázquez-Bourgon, J.; Fañanás, L.; Crespo-Facorro, B. (January 2020). "The synergetic effect of childhood trauma and recent stressful events in psychosis: associated neurocognitive dysfunction". Acta Psychiatrica Scandinavica. 141 (1): 43–51. doi:10.1111/acps.13114. hdl:2445/173141. PMID 31618440. S2CID 204756675.
- Crespo-Facorro, Benedicto; Ruiz-Veguilla, Miguel; Vázquez-Bourgon, Javier; Sánchez-Hidalgo, Ana C.; Garrido-Torres, Nathalia; Cisneros, Jose M.; Prieto, Carlos; Sainz, Jesus (2 March 2021). "Aripiprazole as a Candidate Treatment of COVID-19 Identified Through Genomic Analysis". Frontiers in Pharmacology. 12 646701. doi:10.3389/fphar.2021.646701. PMC 7982825. PMID 33762960.
