= Manuel Andrés González =

Spanish politician (born 1970)

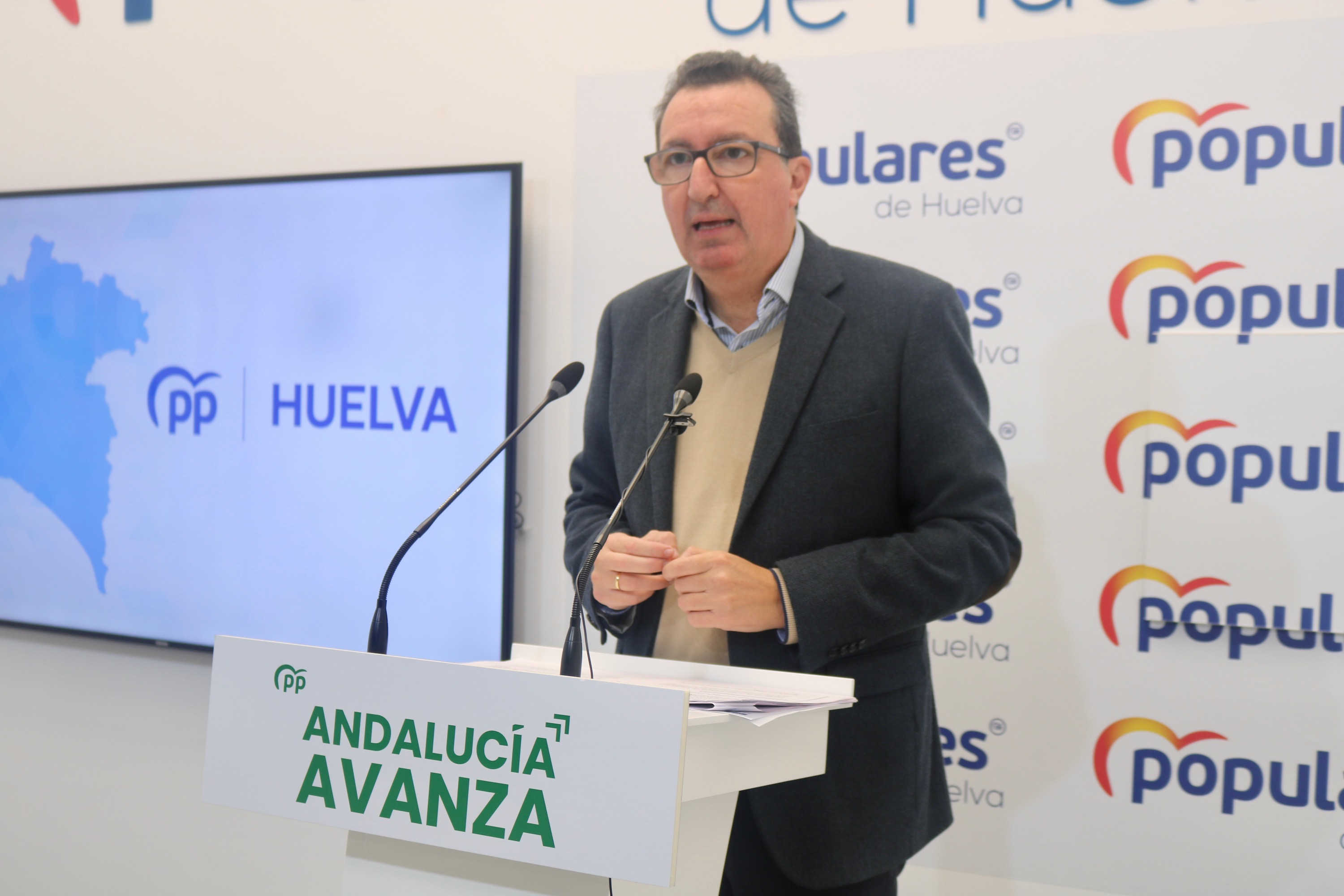
- González in 2023

First Secretary of the Parliament of Andalusia
- Incumbent
- Assumed office 14 July 2022
- President: Jesús Aguirre
- Preceded by: Verónica Pérez Fernández

Personal details
- Born: 8 January 1970 (age 56)
- Party: People's Party

Manuel Andrés González Rivera (born 8 January 1970) is a Spanish politician serving as a member of the Parliament of Andalusia since 2012. He has served as first secretary of the parliament since 2022. From 2003 to 2013, he served as mayor of Lepe.
