= José Ignacio García =

Spanish politician (born 1987)

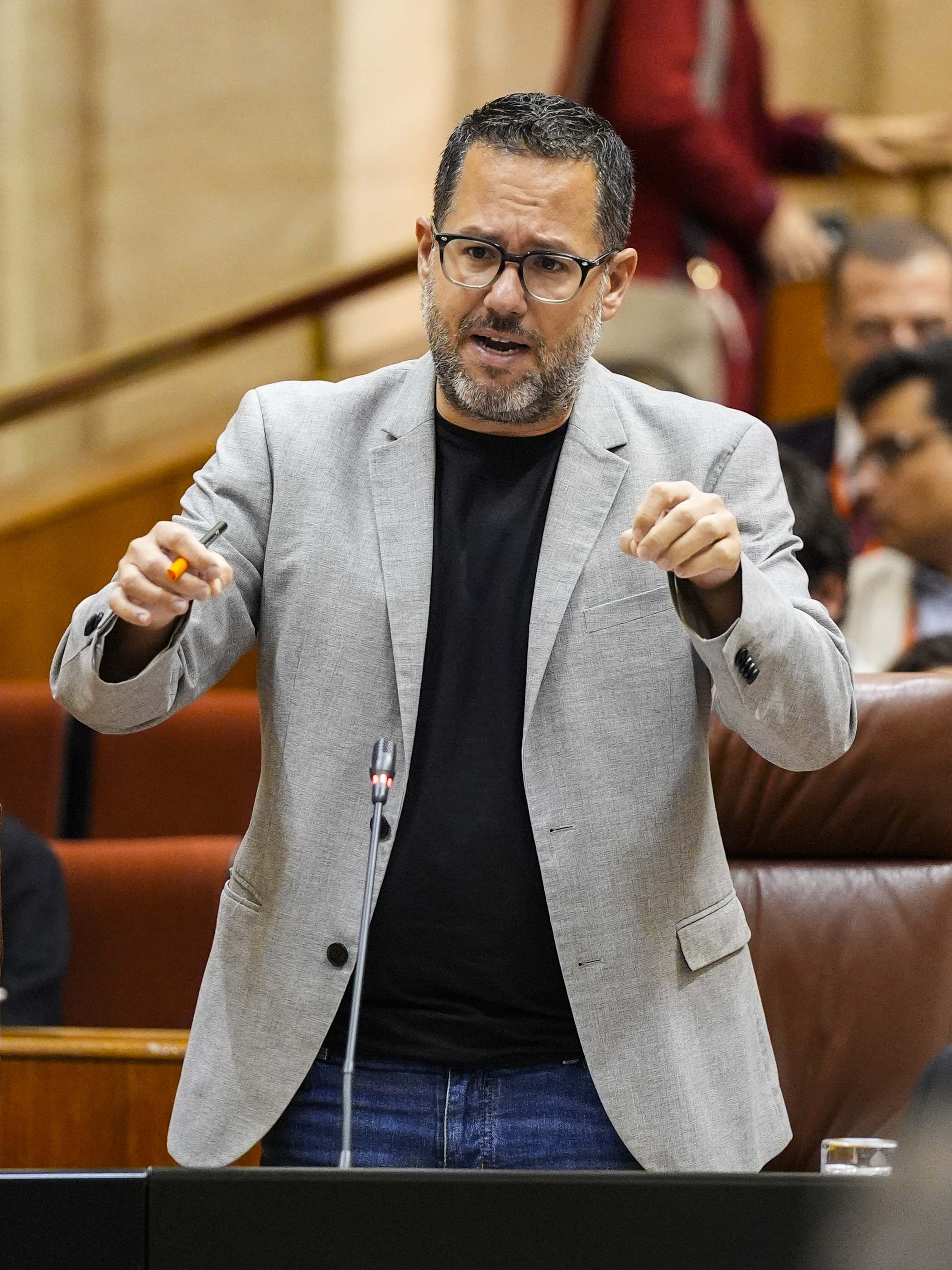

José Ignacio García Sánchez (born 1987) is a Spanish politician. He was elected to the Parliament of Andalusia for the original Adelante Andalusia in 2018, resigning in 2021. He returned to the legislature in 2023, for the party of the same name.

== Biography ==
Born in Jerez de la Frontera in the Province of Cádiz, García earned a psychology degree from the University of Seville. He was active in scouting and left-wing student politics, and joined the party Anticapitalistas.

Ahead of the 2018 Andalusian regional election, García was put second on the electoral list in the Cádiz constituency for Adelante Andalucía, a coalition led by Podemos, a party of which he was a member. The list had three members elected to the Parliament of Andalusia, alongside Ángela Aguilera and Inmaculada Nieto.

In late October 2020, García was one of eight deputies expelled from the Adelante Andalucía group in the Parliament of Andalusia, including lead candidate Teresa Rodríguez. García later said that the other parties in the coalition – Podemos and the United Left – opposed his Andalusian nationalism. In September 2021, García resigned his seat after being told by the Parliament that it was incompatible with his new job as a school guidance counselor.

In the 2022 Andalusian regional election, Rodríguez led a new formation also called Adelante Andalucía. She was elected in Cádiz, with García second on the list. When she resigned in February 2023 to return to the educational profession, he succeeded to her seat. He criticised Sumar, the left-wing coalition founded by Yolanda Díaz, as being centred around Madrid. In March 2024, he took 94% of the vote to succeed Rodríguez as leader of the party.

García proposed a bill that was passed by the Parliament of Andalusia, in which all children would receive €100 towards glasses and contact lenses while fees for adults would be adjusted to income. The measures were then debated on the national level by the Congress of Deputies.
