= Cancer survival rates =

Five year survival rates by cancer type, OWID

Cancer survival rates vary by the type of cancer, stage at diagnosis, treatment given and many other factors, including country. In general survival rates are improving, although more so for some cancers than others. Survival rate can be measured in several ways, median life expectancy having advantages over others in terms of meaning for people involved, rather than as an epidemiological measure.

However, survival rates are currently often measured in terms of 5-year survival rates, which is the percentage of people who live at least five years after being diagnosed with cancer, and relative survival rates compare people with cancer to people in the overall population.

Several types of cancer are associated with high survival rates, including breast, prostate, testicular and colon cancer. Brain and pancreatic cancers have much lower median survival rates which have not improved as dramatically over the last forty years. Indeed, pancreatic cancer has one of the worst survival rates of all cancers. Small cell lung cancer has a five-year survival rate of 4% according to Cancer Centers of America's Website. The American Cancer Society reports 5-year relative survival rates of over 70% for women with stage 0-III breast cancer with a 5-year relative survival rate close to 100% for women with stage 0 or stage I breast cancer. The 5-year relative survival rate drops to 22% for women with stage IV (metastatic) breast cancer.

In cancer types with high survival rates, incidence is usually higher in the developed world, where longevity is also greater. Cancers with lower survival rates are more common in developing countries. The highest cancer survival rates are in countries such as South Korea, Japan, Israel, Australia, and the United States.

== Survival rate trends ==
In the United States there has been an increase in the 5-year relative survival rate between people diagnosed with cancer in 1975-1977 (48.9%) and people diagnosed with cancer in 2007-2013 (69.2%); these figures coincide with a 20% decrease in cancer mortality from 1950 to 2014. Due to innovation in emerging treatments and cancer prevention strategies, the U.S.A cancer death rate has declined from 208.3 per 100,000 people in 1982 to 152.6 per 100,000 in 2017.

=== Lung cancer ===
In males, researchers suggest that the overall reduction in cancer death rates is due in large part to a reduction in tobacco use over the last half century, estimating that the reduction in lung cancer caused by tobacco smoking accounts for about 40% of the overall reduction in cancer death rates in men and is responsible for preventing at least 146,000 lung cancer deaths in men during the time period 1991-2003.

=== Breast cancer ===
The most common cancer among women in the United States is breast cancer (123.7 per 100,000), followed by lung cancer (51.5 per 100,000) and colorectal cancer (33.6 per 100,000), but lung cancer surpasses breast cancer as the leading cause of cancer death among women. Researchers attribute the reduction in breast cancer mortality to improved treatment, including the increased use in adjuvant chemotherapy.

=== Prostate cancer ===
The National Institute of Health (NIH) attributes the increase in the 5-year relative survival of prostate cancer (from 69% in the 1970s to 100% in 2006) to screening and diagnosis and due to the fact that men that participate in screening tend to be healthier and live longer than the average man and testing techniques that are able to detect slow growing cancer before they become life-threatening.

=== Childhood cancer ===
The most common type of cancer among children and adolescents is leukemia, followed by brain and other central nervous system tumors. Survival rates for most childhood cancers have improved, with a notable improvement in acute lymphoblastic leukemia (the most common childhood cancer). Due to improved treatment, the 5-year survival rate for acute lymphoblastic leukemia has increased from less than 10% in the 1960s to about 90% during the time period 2003-2009.

== Improvements in cancer therapy ==
The improvement in survival rates for many cancers in the last half century is due to improved understanding about the causes of cancer and the availability of new treatment options, which are continually evolving. Where surgery was previously the only option for treatment, cancer is now treated with radiation and chemotherapy, including combination chemotherapy that favors treatment with many drugs over just one. Availability and access to clinical trials has also led to more targeted therapy and improved knowledge of treatment efficacy. There are currently over 60,000 clinical trials related to cancer registered on ClinicalTrials.gov, so novel approaches to cancer treatment are continuing to be developed. The NCI lists over 100 targeted therapies that have been approved for the treatment of 26 different cancer types by the United States Food and Drug Administration.

== See also ==
- Cancer prevalence
- Cancer survivor
