= Manuel Gavira =

Spanish politician

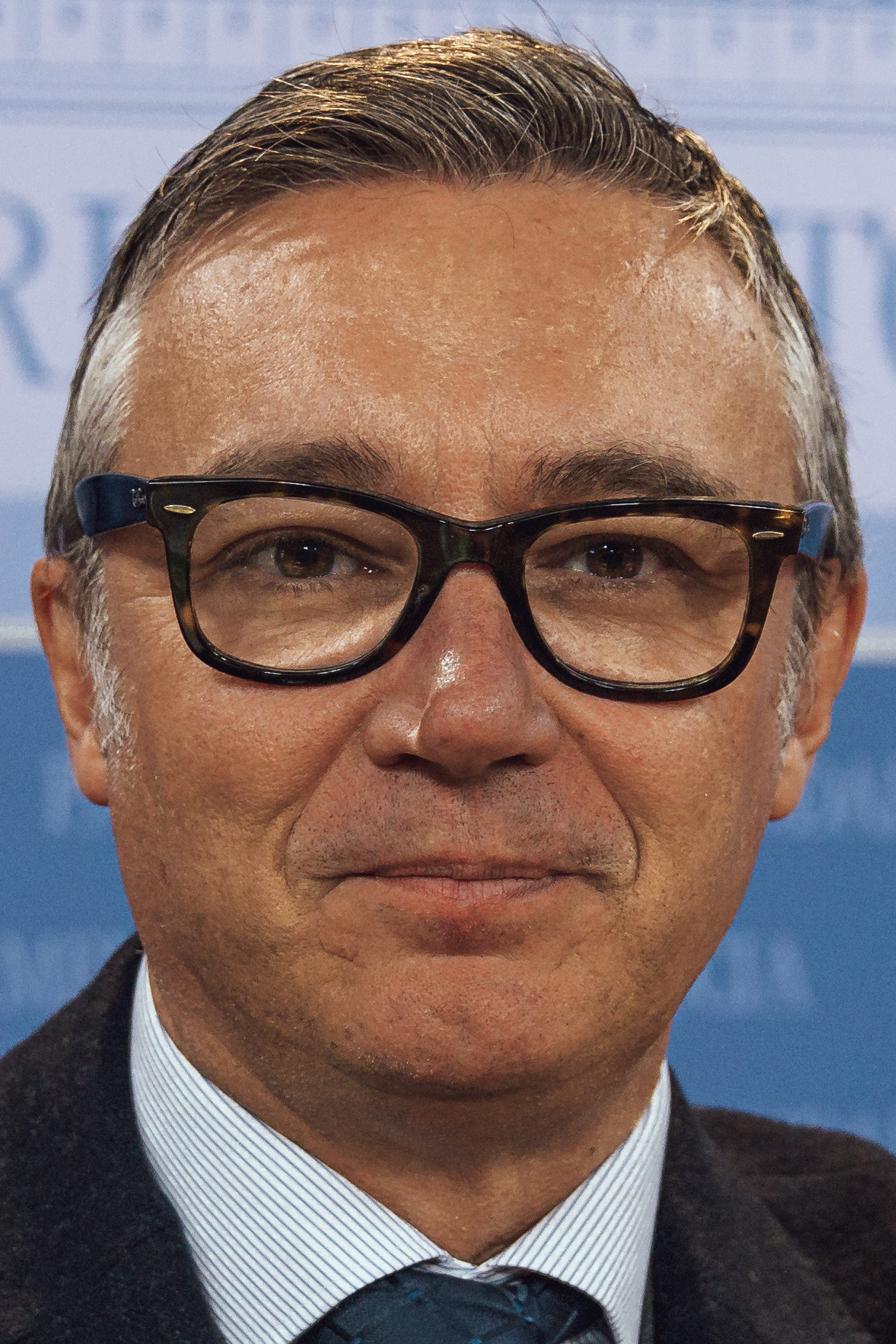

Manuel Gavira Florentino (born 1969) is a Spanish politician of the party Vox. He was elected to the Parliament of Andalusia in 2018 and became his party's leader in the assembly in 2022.

== Biography ==
Gavira is the father of two children. He is a lawyer, and a mediator in civil and mercantile issues, as well as a business consultant.

In the 2018 Andalusian regional election, Gavira was one of two Vox deputies elected to the Parliament of Andalusia by the Cádiz constituency. As part of Vox's confidence and supply to the People's Party and Citizens government, the party earned a place on the parliamentary board, with Gavira being named third secretary. He was the first Vox member to hold an office in a regional parliament. In April 2021, Gavira became Vox's parliamentary spokesperson in place of Alejandro Hernández, while Macario Valpuesta took Gavira's secretarial post.

Gavira again led the Vox list in Cádiz in the 2022 Andalusian regional election. Vox maintained its two seats from the constituency. Weeks after the election, lead candidate Macarena Olona resigned for health reasons and Gavira replaced her as Vox's spokesperson in the Parliament.

During a debate on immigration coinciding with UEFA Euro 2024, Gavira was asked if he like the goal by Lamine Yamal, a Spain national football team player with African immigrant parents. Gavira said he was happy for Lamine Yamal but "If he hadn't scored it, somebody else would have".
