= Parliament of Andalusia =

Spanish autonomous community legislature

Coordinates: 37.404836°N 5.988197°W

Parliament of Andalusia Parlamento de Andalucía

Type
- Type: Spanish regional legislature
- Houses: Unicameral

Leadership
- President: Ana Mestre García, PP since 23 July 2026
- First Vice President: Christina Plaz, vox since 23 July 2026
- Second Vice President: Fernando López Gil, PSOE–A since 11 June 2026
- Third Vice President: Manuel Andrés González, PP since 11 June 2026
- First Secretary: José Ramón Carmona, PP since 11 June 2026
- Second Secretary: Olga Manzano, PSOE–A since 11 June 2026
- Third Secretary: José Ignacio Romani, PP since 11 June 2026

Structure
- Seats: 109
- Political groups: Government (68): PP (53); Vox (15); Opposition (41): PSOE–A (28); AA (8); For Andalusia (5) (Note: IULV–CA (4); MS (1))

Elections
- Last election: 17 May 2026
- Next election: No later than 2030

Meeting place
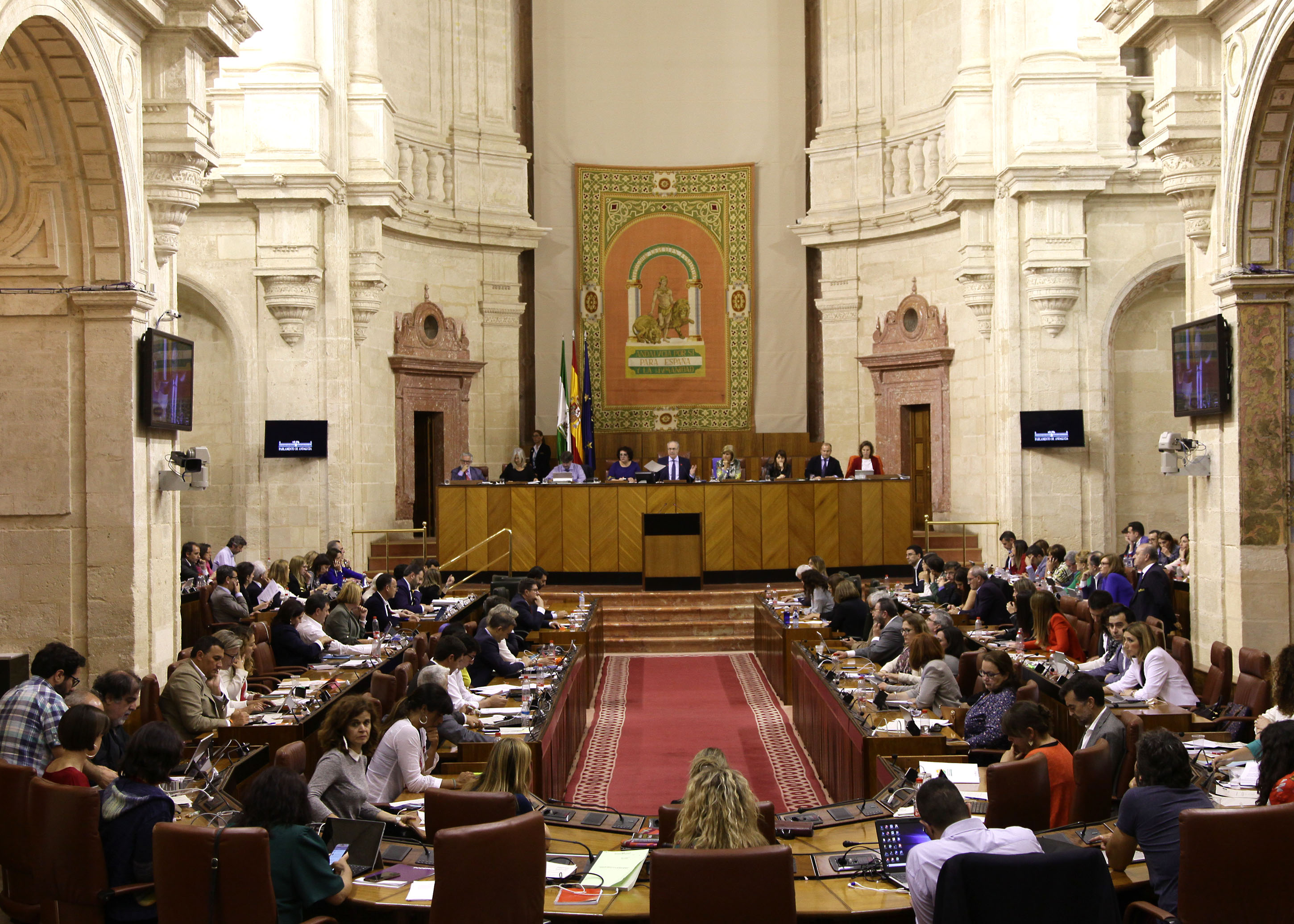
- Hospital de las Cinco Llagas, Seville

Website
- http://www.parlamentodeandalucia.es

The Parliament of Andalusia (Spanish: Parlamento de Andalucía) is the legislature of the Spanish autonomous community of Andalusia instituted by the Andalusian Charter of Autonomy of 1981. It is elected by the residents of Andalusia every four years.

== Functions ==
- To elect the President of the Autonomous Government of Andalusia.
- To pass the Andalusian regional legislation in the business of its competence.
- To pass the budget of Andalusia
- To control the action of the Andalusian Autonomous Government Administration and the autonomous agencies, public companies and all other bodies answerable to it. Such as
  - The local authorities in the Andalusian territory, as well as the autonomous agencies and public companies answerable to them.
  - Andalusian Public Universities.
  - Andalusian Chambers of Commerce and other institutions mostly financed by public funds.

== Membership ==
The Andalusian Parliament consists of 109 Members elected for four year terms in proportional party lists using the D'Hondt method in eight constituencies, being each one of the Andalusian provinces. If more than five MPs are elected for any party they will form a Parliamentary Group.

After the 2018 elections, the PSOE-A was the largest party, as has happened in every election, but for the first time in the history of the regional parliament, there was a majority of right-of-centre parties. Center-right People's Party and Citizens formed a coalition government with confidence and supply from far-right Vox.

== Results of the elections to the Parliament of Andalusia ==
Deputies in the Parliament of Andalusia since 1982
Key to parties PSA-PA PCA-PCE UCD AP PSOE-A IULV-CA AP-PDP-PL PP PA-PAP C’s Podemos Adelante Andalucía Vox PorA
| Election | Distribution | President |
| 1983 | 8 / 66 / 3 / 15 / 17 | Rafael Escuredo (PSOE-A) |
| 1986 | 19 / 2 / 60 / 28 | José Rodríguez de la Borbolla (PSOE-A) |
| 1990 | 11 / 10 / 62 / 26 | Manuel Chaves (PSOE-A) |
| 1994 | 20 / 3 / 45 / 41 | Manuel Chaves (PSOE-A) |
| 1996 | 13 / 4 / 52 / 40 | Manuel Chaves (PSOE-A) |
| 2000 | 6 / 5 / 52 / 46 | Manuel Chaves (PSOE-A) |
| 2004 | 6 / 5 / 61 / 37 | Manuel Chaves (PSOE-A) |
| 2008 | 6 / 56 / 47 | Manuel Chaves (PSOE-A) |
| 2012 | 12 / 47 / 50 | José Antonio Griñán (PSOE-A) |
| 2015 | 5 / 15 / 47 / 9 / 33 | Susana Díaz (PSOE-A) |
| 2018 | 17 / 33 / 21 / 26 / 12 | Juanma Moreno (PP) |
| 2022 | 2 / 5 / 30 / 58 / 14 | Juanma Moreno (PP) |
| 2026 | 8 / 5 / 28 / 53 / 15 | Juanma Moreno (PP) |

== Location ==
The seat of the Andalusian Parliament is located in Seville, the capital city of Andalusia. Its building is the former Hospital of the Cinco Llagas ("Five Wounds"). Built in 1546 by order of Don Fadrique Enríquez de Ribera. It was designed by Martín de Gainza. The building was used as a hospital until 1972. In 1986 the plans for turning the building into the headquarters of Andalusia's parliament were drawn up, and the building was inaugurated as the seat of the Andalusian Parliament on 28 February 1992, the Andalusia Day.

== See also ==
- List of presidents of the Parliament of Andalusia
