= Hospital Universitario Virgen del Rocío =

Coordinates: 37°21′42″N 5°58′50″W

Hospital Universitario Virgen del Rocío Virgen del Rocío University Hospital
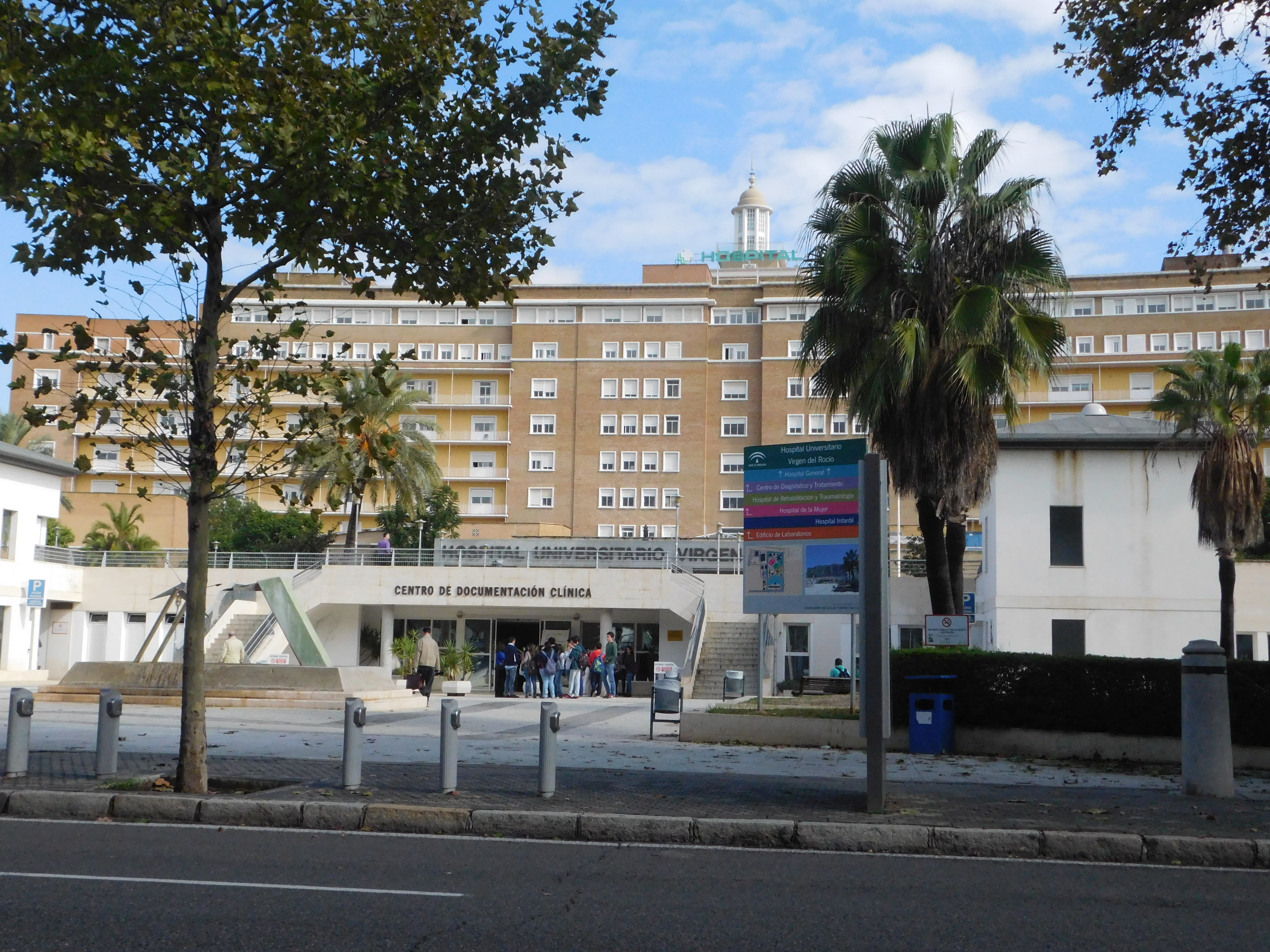
- Hospital Virgen del Rocío

Geography
- Location: Seville, Spain

Organisation
- Affiliated university: University of Seville

Services
- Beds: 1251

History
- Founded: 1955

Links
- Website: www.hospitaluvrocio.es
- Lists: Hospitals in Spain

Hospital Universitario Virgen del Rocío (English: Virgen del Rocío University Hospital), also known as HUVR, is a complex of hospitals in the center of Seville, and is the largest hospital (Note: For the rest of this article it will be used the term 'hospital' to address the set of buildings or complex of hospitals managed under the supervision of the Hospital Universitario Virgen del Rocío, unless specifically stated otherwise) in southern Spain. It is managed by the public company "Servicio Andaluz de Salud" and is considered one of the best hospitals in Spain.

HUVR is one of the regional hospitals of Andalusia, and counts over 8,000 professionals, 54 surgery rooms, 1,291 beds and 450 clinical consultation rooms. It is also affiliated to the University of Seville, being one of the main practical centers for health-care studies.

The complex includes the following hospitals:

- General Hospital
- Traumatology and Rehabilitation Hospital
- Birth and Pediatrics Hospital
- "Duques del Infantado" Hospital

It is famous for being the second Hospital in Spain to perform a successful face transplantation, in 2010.

== History ==
The construction of the hospital began in the 50s, being finally opened in 1955, meaning an important improvement on the state of health care in the province. Its initial name was Residencia Sanitaria García Morato, which was used until the 70s.

The initial design counted only with one main building (nowadays the General Hospital), and was mainly used for surgery proceedings. By the 60s, the management was restructured, dividing the hospital in departments, and a new building was inaugurated in the complex, nowadays the Rehabilitation and Traumatology Hospital, followed by the Birth and Pediatrics Hospital.

Later on, the hospital has incorporated the Regional Center for Blood Transfusions, the female school for nursering (now extinct), the Diagnosticsand Treatment Center and the Pabillion of Pathologic Anatomy. In the 80s, the hospital transferred it management to the regional government (Junta de Andalucia) and signed a collaboration with the University of Seville, obtaining from then on the denomination of "University Hospital".

== Area of Influence ==
The complex is cataloged as a regional hospital, that is, a third level center which offers the medical specialties included in the Spanish Healthcare System.

Its influence area extends through the western side of Andalusia (provinces of Seville and Huelva), which adds around 550,000 inhabitants. The hospital hosts over 8,000 different professionals, with a budget of €516,831,000. In a year, it averages, among others, 50,000 hospitalizations, 300,000 consultations of emergency medicine, 47,000 surgeries, 1,160,000 external consultations, 6,000 births and 280 transplants.

== Associated Centers ==
Denter	Address
Main Campus	Avda. Manuel Siurot, s/n. 41013 Sevilla
Hospital General	Avda. Manuel Siurot, s/n. 41013 Sevilla
Hospital de Rehabilitación y Traumatología (Rehabilitation and Trauma)	Avda. Manuel Siurot, s/n. 41013 Sevilla
Hospital de la Mujer (Women's hospital)	Avda. Manuel Siurot, s/n. 41013 Sevilla
Hospital Infantil (Children's hospital)	Avda. Manuel Siurot, s/n. 41013 Sevilla
Centro de Diagnóstico y Tratamiento (Diagnosis and treatment)	Avda. Manuel Siurot, s/n. 41013 Sevilla
Edificio de Laboratorio (Laboratory)	Avda. Manuel Siurot, s/n. 41013 Sevilla
Anatomía Patológica (Pathologic anatomy)	Avda. Manuel Siurot, s/n. 41013 Sevilla
Centro de Documentación Clínica (Clinical documentation)	Avda. Manuel Siurot, s/n. 41013 Sevilla
Edificio de Gobierno (Central management)	Avda. Manuel Siurot, s/n. 41013 Sevilla
Edificio de Gestión de Recursos (Resources management)	Avda. Manuel Siurot, s/n. 41013 Sevilla
Instituto de Biomedicina de Sevilla (Biomedicine)	Avda. Manuel Siurot, s/n. 41013 Sevilla
Cocina (Kitchen)	Avda. Manuel Siurot, s/n. 41013 Sevilla
Lavandería (Laundry)	Avda. Manuel Siurot, s/n. 41013 Sevilla
Hospital Duques del Infantado	C/ Sor Gregoria de Santa Teresa, s/n. 41012 Sevilla
C. E. Dr. Fleming	C/ Juan de Padilla, nº 8. 41005 Sevilla
C. E. Virgen de los Reyes	C/ Marqués de Paradas, nº 35. 41001 Sevilla
Centros de Salud Mental (Mental healthcare):	Avda. Manuel Siurot, s/n. 41013 Sevilla
Unidad de Hospitalización de Salud Mental V. del Rocío (Mental healthcare I)	Avda. Manuel Siurot, s/n. 41013 Sevilla
Hospital de Día Infanto-juvenil V. del Rocío (Children and youth's daytime hospital)	Avda. Manuel Siurot, s/n. 41013 Sevilla
Unidad de Hospitalización Salud Mental H. San Lázaro (Mental healthcare II)	Avda. Dr. Fedriani, nº 56. 41009 Sevilla
Hospital de Día Salud Mental (Daytime mental healthcare hospital)	Avda. de Jerez, s/n (Antiguo Hospital Vigil de Quiñones). 41013 Sevilla
Unidad de Rehabilitación de Salud Mental V. del Rocío (Rehabilitation and mental healthcare)	Avda. Kansas City, nº 32. 41007 Sevilla
Comunidad Terapéutica V. del Rocío I Santa Clara (Therapy I)	C/ Conde de Osborne, nº 3. 41007 Sevilla
Comunidad Terapéutica V. del Rocío II Los Bermejales (Therapy II)	Avda. de Jerez, s/n (Antiguo Hospital Vigil de Quiñones). 41013 Sevilla
Unidad de Salud Mental Comunitaria Este (Community mental healthcare I)	C/ Juan de Padilla, nº 8, 4ª planta. 41005 Sevilla
Unidad de Salud Mental Comunitaria Guadalquivir (Community mental healthcare II)	C/ Marqués de Paradas, nº 49, 1ª planta. 41001 Sevilla
Unidad de Salud Mental Comunitaria Mairena (Community mental healthcare III)	C/ Clara Campoamor, nº 10. 41927 Mairena del Aljarafe
Unidad de Salud Mental Comunitaria Aljarafe (Community mental healthcare IV)	Avda. Príncipe de España, s/n. 41900 Sanlúcar La Mayor
Unidad de Salud Mental Comunitaria Oriente (Sevilla Este) (Community mental healthcare V)	Cueva de la Pileta, s/n 41020 Sevilla
Unidad de Salud Mental Comunitaria Sur (Community mental healthcare VI)	Avda. de Manuel Siurot, s/n 41013 Sevilla

=== Research and Medical Specialties ===
The hospital Virgen del Rocio is known for the quality of its research, both inside and outside of Spain. In fact, the Biomedical Research Institute of Seville is managed by the same complex, so that professionals can participate and manage biomedical research projects found in their consultations, easing the transference of research.

Professionals working at the HUVR participate are also part of different excellence efforts, like the European Research Network (ERN), the Reference Centers, Services and Units (CSUR) and the Reference Services in the Andalusian Public Health System (Servicios de Referencia en el Sistema Sanitario Público de Andalucía) working on different projects.

== European Research Network (ERN) ==
- Rare Neuromuscular Diseases European Reference Network
- European Paediatric Oncology Reference Network for Diagnosticos and Treatment (EPO-r-NeT)
- Neuroblastoma
- Rare cancers: Sarcomas and other musculoskeletal tumors both in infants and adults

== Reference Centers, Services and Units (CSUR) ==
- Critical burns
- Infant kidney transplant
- Pelvic osteotomy in adult hip dysplasia
- Resistant osteoarticular infections' treatment
- Infant orthopedics
- Infant allogeneic hematopoietic progenitor transplant
- Reimplantation, including the catastrophic hand
- Cross kidney transplant
- Brachial plexus surgery
- Rare diseases that occur with movement disorders
- Rare Neuromuscular Diseases
- Sarcoma in childhood
- Sarcoma and other musculoskeletal tumors in adults
- Neuroblastoma
- Rare Neuromuscular Diseases
- Renal tumors with vascular involvement (pending resolution)
- Germinal tumors of high and intermediate risk and resistant to first-line chemotherapy in adults (pending resolution)
- Serious Kidney Disease and treatment with dialysis (pending audit)
- Congenital Metabolic Diseases (pending audit)

== Reference Services in the Andalusian Public Health System ==
- Cross kidney transplant
- Kidney transplant from living donor and cadaver
- Liver transplant from cadaver donor
- Adult heart transplant
- Reference laboratory for the molecular study in tuberculosis
- Bladder Exstrophy and Epispadias
- Acute and chronic porphyrias
- Amyotrophic Lateral Sclerosis
- Cystic fibrosis
- Endothelial lamellar keratoplasty (DSAEK)
- Laboratory of metabolopathies. Neonatal screening
- Complex fetal medicine
- Preimplantation Genetic Diagnosis
- Branchial plexus surgery
- Child Orthopedics
- Pelvic osteotome in adult hip dysplasias
- Treatment of resistant osteoarticular infections
- Critical burns
- Reimplantation unit including the catastrophic hand
- Transplantation of allogeneic hematopoietic progenitors infantile
- Neuroblastoma
- Rare diseases that deal with movement disorders
- Kidney transplant in underweight children

=== Teaching ===
The HUVR has an agreement with the University of Seville, to improve the knowledge both in experimental and empirical science, and the formation of its professionals (Diagnosis, prognosis, therapy and practical abilities).

The undergraduate activity at the University Hospital adds up to:

- Teachers in the Faculty of Medicine: 81
- Professors of the Faculty of Nursing, Physiotherapy and Podiatry: 31
- Students Degree of Medicine: 558
- Students Degree of Nursing: 230
- Students Degree of Physiotherapy: 174

Regarding postgraduate training, the data are as follows:

- Residential Resident Specialist Tutors: 152
- Accredited places: 178 and offered: 121
- Resident Internal Specialists: 466
