= Málaga (Parliament of Andalusia constituency) =

Coordinates: 36°43′N 4°25′W

- Parliament of Andalusia; Electoral constituency
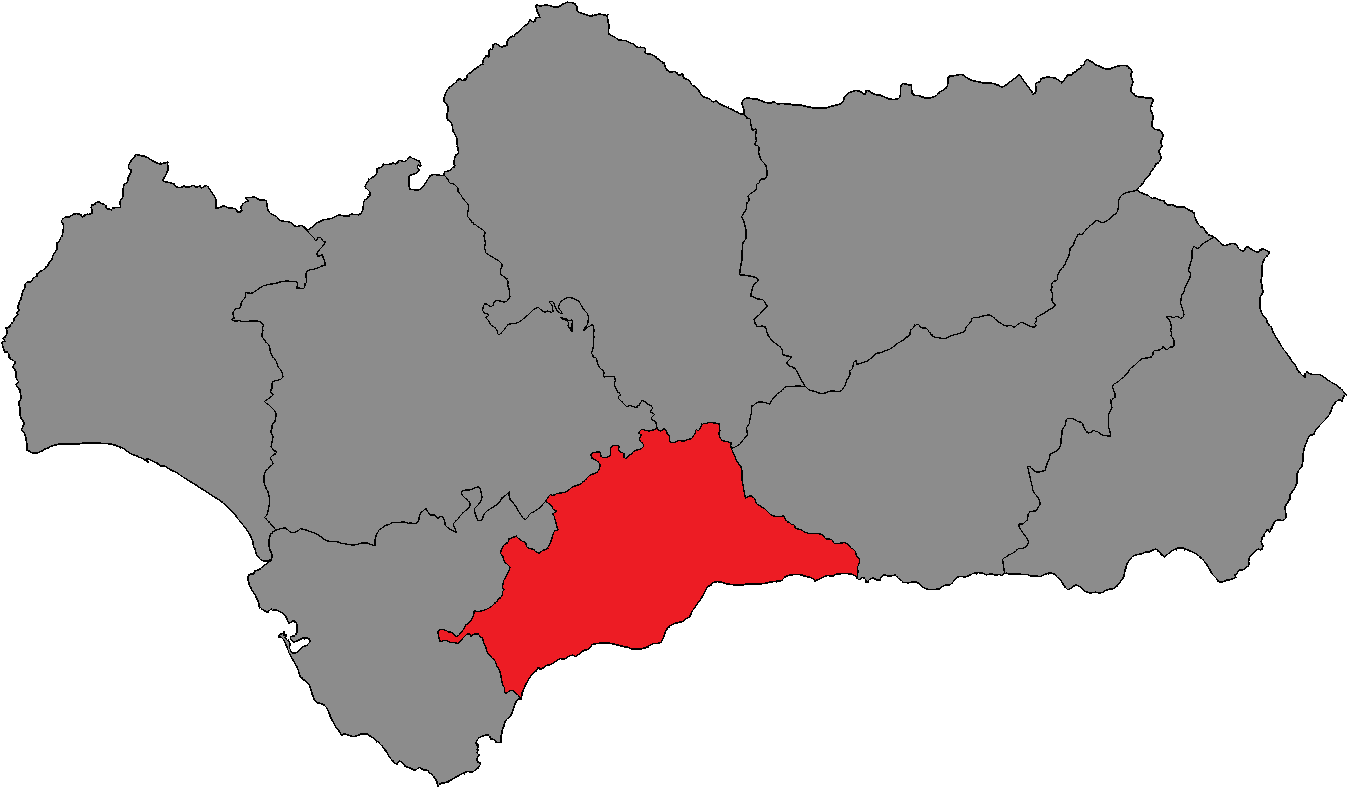
- Location of Málaga within Andalusia
- Province: Málaga
- Autonomous community: Andalusia
- Population: ▲1,791,092 (2025)
- Electorate: ▲1,284,143 (2026)
- Major settlements: Málaga, Marbella, Vélez-Málaga, Mijas, Fuengirola, Torremolinos, Benalmádena, Estepona

Current constituency
- Created: 1982
- Seats: 15 (1982–1990); 16 (1990–1996); 15 (1996–2000); 16 (2000–2012); 17 (2012–present)
- Members: PP (9); PSOE–A (4); Vox (2); AA (1); PorA (1)

Málaga is one of the eight constituencies (Spanish: circunscripciones) represented in the Parliament of Andalusia, the regional legislature of the Autonomous Community of Andalusia. The constituency currently elects 17 deputies. Its boundaries correspond to those of the Spanish province of Málaga. The electoral system uses the D'Hondt method and closed-list proportional representation, with a minimum threshold of three percent.

== Electoral system ==
The constituency was established under the Statute of Autonomy for Andalusia of 1981 and was first contested in the 1982 regional election. The Statute (reformed in 2007) provides for the eight provinces in Andalusia—Almería, Cádiz, Córdoba, Granada, Huelva, Jaén, Málaga and Seville—to be set as multi-member constituencies in the Parliament of Andalusia, each of which is assigned an initial minimum of eight seats and the remaining ones are distributed in proportion to population (with the number of seats in each province not exceeding two times that of any other). The exception was the 1982 election, when each constituency was allocated a fixed number of seats. Seats are elected using the D'Hondt method and closed-list proportional voting, with a three percent-threshold of valid votes (including blank ballots) in each constituency. The use of this electoral method may result in a higher effective threshold depending on district magnitude and vote distribution. The law does not provide for by-elections to fill vacant seats; instead, any vacancies arising after the proclamation of candidates and during the legislative term are filled by the next candidates on the party lists or, when required, by designated substitutes.

Voting is based on universal suffrage, comprising all Spanish nationals over 18 years of age, registered in the constituency and with full political rights. Amendments in 2011 required non-resident citizens to apply for voting, a system known as "begged" voting (Spanish: Voto rogado), which was abolished in 2022 and attributed responsibility for a major decrease in the turnout of Spaniards abroad during the years it was in force. Additionally, those legally incapacitated were also barred from voting before amendments in 2018 granted them the right to vote.

The electoral law allows for parties and federations registered in the interior ministry, alliances and groupings of electors to present lists of candidates. Parties and federations intending to form an alliance are required to inform the relevant electoral commission within 10 days of the election call—15 before 1985—whereas groupings of electors need to secure the signature of at least one percent of the electorate in the constituencies for which they seek election (before 1985 this was one permille, with a compulsory minimum of 500 signatures), disallowing electors from signing for more than one list. Amendments in 2005 required a balanced composition of men and women in the electoral lists through the use of a zipper system.

== Deputies ==
Deputies 1982–present
Key to parties PCA–PCE IU–CA IULV–CA Adelante AA PorA Podemos PA PSOE–A Cs UCD PP CP AP Vox
Parliament	Election	Distribution
1st	1982	1 / 1 / 9 / 1 / 3
2nd	1986	3 / 8 / 4
3rd	1990	2 / 1 / 9 / 4
4th	1994	4 / 6 / 6
5th	1996	2 / 1 / 6 / 6
6th	2000	1 / 1 / 7 / 7
7th	2004	1 / 1 / 8 / 6
8th	2008	1 / 7 / 8
9th	2012	2 / 7 / 8
10th	2015	1 / 3 / 6 / 2 / 5
11th	2018	3 / 4 / 4 / 4 / 2
12th	2022	1 / 4 / 10 / 2
13th	2026	1 / 1 / 4 / 9 / 2

== Regional elections ==
=== 2026 ===
Summary of the 17 May 2026 Parliament of Andalusia election results in Málaga
Parties and alliances	Popular vote			Seats	
Parties and alliances	Votes	%	±pp	Total	+/−
People's Party (PP)	332,319	44.03	−2.99	9	−1
Spanish Socialist Workers' Party of Andalusia (PSOE–A)	151,277	20.04	−0.70	4	±0
Vox (Vox)	109,913	14.56	+1.04	2	±0
Forward Andalusia (Adelante Andalucía)	70,287	9.31	+5.53	1	+1
For Andalusia (IU–Podemos–MS–IdPA–VQ–ALTER–AV)	45,160	5.98	−2.10	1	±0
The Party is Over (SALF)	22,735	3.01	New	0	±0
Animalist Party with the Environment (PACMA)^{1}	5,865	0.78	−0.52	0	±0
Andalusians–Andalusian People (Andalucistas–PA)^{2}	2,195	0.29	+0.06	0	±0
Blank Seats to Leave Empty Seats (EB)	1,840	0.24	+0.12	0	±0
Self-employed Party (Partido Autónomos)	1,224	0.16	+0.05	0	±0
Communist Party of the Andalusian People (PCPA)	1,170	0.16	+0.06	0	±0
For a Fairer World (M+J)	943	0.12	+0.04	0	±0
Spanish Phalanx of the CNSO (FE de las JONS)	939	0.12	+0.09	0	±0
Malagenian Alternative (29)	768	0.10	New	0	±0
Andalusian Nation (NA)	495	0.07	−0.01	0	±0
Connect Andalusia (Conecta)	339	0.04	New	0	±0
United Society (Sociedad Unida)	237	0.03	New	0	±0
Blank ballots	7,090	0.94	+0.02		
Total	754,796			17	±0
Valid votes	754,796	99.04	−0.02		
Invalid votes	7,311	0.96	+0.02		
Votes cast / turnout	762,107	59.35	+5.67		
Abstentions	522,041	40.65	−5.67		
Registered voters	1,284,148				
Sources
Footnotes: ^{1} Animalist Party with the Environment results are compared to Animalist Party Against Mistreatment of Animals totals in the 2022 election.; ^{2} Andalusians–Andalusian People results are compared to Arise Andalusians Coalition in the 2022 election.

=== 2022 ===
Summary of the 19 June 2022 Parliament of Andalusia election results in Málaga
Parties and alliances	Popular vote			Seats	
Parties and alliances	Votes	%	±pp	Total	+/−
People's Party (PP)	306,688	47.02	+24.45	10	+6
Spanish Socialist Workers' Party of Andalusia (PSOE–A)	135,304	20.74	–3.45	4	±0
Vox (Vox)	88,215	13.52	+2.02	2	±0
United Left–More Country–Greens Equo–Initiative: For Andalusia (PorA)^{1}	52,713	8.08	n/a	1	±0
Forward Andalusia–Andalusians (Adelante Andalucía–Andalucistas)^{1}	24,625	3.78	n/a	0	–2
Citizens–Party of the Citizenry (Cs)	22,619	3.47	–16.33	0	–4
Animalist Party Against Mistreatment of Animals (PACMA)	8,508	1.30	–1.21	0	±0
Arise Andalusians Coalition (AL)^{2}	1,512	0.23	–0.16	0	±0
Volt Spain (Volt)	923	0.14	New	0	±0
Blank Seats (EB)	791	0.12	New	0	±0
Socialist Republican Coalition for Andalusia (CRSxA)^{3}	739	0.11	+0.03	0	±0
Self-employed Party (Partido Autónomos)	707	0.11	New	0	±0
Communist Party of the Andalusian People (PCPA)	678	0.10	–0.10	0	±0
Communist Party of the Workers of Spain (PCTE)	543	0.08	New	0	±0
For a Fairer World (PUM+J)	542	0.08	New	0	±0
Andalusian Nation (NA)	495	0.08	–0.04	0	±0
Zero Cuts (Recortes Cero)	439	0.07	–0.15	0	±0
Spanish Phalanx of the CNSO (FE de las JONS)	174	0.03	–0.05	0	±0
Blank ballots	6,026	0.92	–0.49		
Total	652,241			17	±0
Valid votes	652,241	99.06	+0.66		
Invalid votes	6,179	0.94	–0.66		
Votes cast / turnout	658,420	53.68	–0.54		
Abstentions	568,242	46.32	+0.54		
Registered voters	1,226,662				
Sources
Footnotes: ^{1} Within the Forward–We Can–United Left–Spring–Andalusian Left alliance in the 2018 election.; ^{2} Arise Andalusians Coalition results are compared to Andalusia by Herself totals in the 2018 election.; ^{3} Socialist Republican Coalition for Andalusia results are compared to Republican Alternative totals in the 2018 election.

=== 2018 ===
Summary of the 2 December 2018 Parliament of Andalusia election results in Málaga
Parties and alliances	Popular vote			Seats	
Parties and alliances	Votes	%	±pp	Total	+/−
Spanish Socialist Workers' Party of Andalusia (PSOE–A)	152,977	24.19	–5.92	4	–2
People's Party (PP)	142,746	22.57	–5.75	4	–1
Citizens–Party of the Citizenry (Cs)	125,235	19.80	+8.03	4	+2
Forward–We Can–United Left–Spring–Andalusian Left (Adelante Andalucía)^{1}	99,075	15.67	–6.81	3	–1
Vox (Vox)	72,729	11.50	+11.15	2	+2
Animalist Party Against Mistreatment of Animals (PACMA)	15,866	2.51	+1.45	0	±0
Equo Greens–Andalusia Initiative (Equo–Iniciativa)	3,199	0.51	New	0	±0
Andalusia by Herself (AxSí)^{2}	2,435	0.39	–0.60	0	±0
United Free Citizens (CILUS)	2,350	0.37	–0.26	0	±0
Zero Cuts–For a Fairer World–Green Group (Recortes Cero–M+J–GV)^{3}	1,369	0.22	+0.09	0	±0
Communist Party of the Andalusian People (PCPA)	1,234	0.20	+0.10	0	±0
Union, Progress and Democracy (UPyD)	1,130	0.18	–2.45	0	±0
Andalusian Nation (NA)	788	0.12	New	0	±0
To Solution (Soluciona)	500	0.08	New	0	±0
Republican Alternative (ALTER)	497	0.08	New	0	±0
Spanish Phalanx of the CNSO (FE de las JONS)	483	0.08	–0.05	0	±0
Connect Andalusia (ConecAnd)	456	0.07	New	0	±0
Revolutionary Anticapitalist Left (IZAR)	374	0.06	New	0	±0
Blank ballots	8,944	1.41	+0.16		
Total	632,387			17	±0
Valid votes	632,387	98.40	–0.73		
Invalid votes	10,304	1.60	+0.73		
Votes cast / turnout	642,691	54.22	–4.70		
Abstentions	542,575	45.78	+4.70		
Registered voters	1,185,266				
Sources
Footnotes: ^{1} Forward–We Can–United Left–Spring–Andalusian Left results are compared to the combined totals of We Can and United Left/The Greens–Assembly for Andalusia in the 2015 election.; ^{2} Andalusia by Herself results are compared to Andalusian Party totals in the 2015 election.; ^{3} Zero Cuts–For a Fairer World–Green Group results are compared to Zero Cuts totals in the 2015 election.

=== 2015 ===
Summary of the 22 March 2015 Parliament of Andalusia election results in Málaga
Parties and alliances	Popular vote			Seats	
Parties and alliances	Votes	%	±pp	Total	+/−
Spanish Socialist Workers' Party of Andalusia (PSOE–A)	202,785	30.11	–5.16	6	–1
People's Party (PP)	190,749	28.32	–15.38	5	–3
We Can (Podemos)	101,754	15.11	New	3	+3
Citizens–Party of the Citizenry (C's)	79,297	11.77	New	2	+2
United Left/The Greens–Assembly for Andalusia (IULV–CA)	49,625	7.37	–4.81	1	–1
Union, Progress and Democracy (UPyD)	17,700	2.63	–1.67	0	±0
Animalist Party Against Mistreatment of Animals (PACMA)	7,111	1.06	+0.73	0	±0
Andalusian Party (PA)	6,679	0.99	–1.00	0	±0
United Free Citizens (CILUS)	4,274	0.63	New	0	±0
Vox (Vox)	2,373	0.35	New	0	±0
Spanish Phalanx of the CNSO (FE de las JONS)	873	0.13	+0.04	0	±0
Zero Cuts (Recortes Cero)	872	0.13	New	0	±0
Communist Party of the Peoples of Spain (PCPE)	660	0.10	–0.01	0	±0
Neo-Democrats (Neodemócratas)	278	0.04	New	0	±0
Blank ballots	8,424	1.25	+0.34		
Total	673,454			17	±0
Valid votes	673,454	99.13	–0.35		
Invalid votes	5,906	0.87	+0.35		
Votes cast / turnout	679,360	58.92	+2.59		
Abstentions	473,686	41.08	–2.59		
Registered voters	1,153,046				

=== 2012 ===
Summary of the 25 March 2012 Parliament of Andalusia election results in Málaga
Parties and alliances	Popular vote			Seats	
Parties and alliances	Votes	%	±pp	Total	+/−
People's Party (PP)	274,374	43.70	+0.11	8	±0
Spanish Socialist Workers' Party of Andalusia (PSOE–A)	221,443	35.27	–7.91	7	±0
United Left/The Greens–Assembly for Andalusia (IULV–CA)	76,458	12.18	+5.06	2	+1
Union, Progress and Democracy (UPyD)	27,016	4.30	+3.61	0	±0
Andalusian Party (PA)^{1}	12,494	1.99	–0.81	0	±0
Equo (Equo)	2,843	0.45	New	0	±0
Animalist Party Against Mistreatment of Animals (PACMA)	2,052	0.33	New	0	±0
Blank Seats (EB)	1,020	0.16	New	0	±0
We Won't Pay this Crisis (ECNP)	809	0.13	New	0	±0
Hartos.org (Hartos.org)	778	0.12	New	0	±0
Communist Party of the Peoples of Spain (PCPE)	716	0.11	–0.02	0	±0
Spanish Phalanx of the CNSO (FE de las JONS)	565	0.09	New	0	±0
Humanist Party (PH)	427	0.07	–0.04	0	±0
Republican Social Movement (MSR)	281	0.04	New	0	±0
Liberal Democratic Centre (CDL)	201	0.03	New	0	±0
Internationalist Solidarity and Self-Management (SAIn)	195	0.03	New	0	±0
Citizens of Democratic Centre (CCD)	186	0.03	New	0	±0
Communist Unification of Spain (UCE)	156	0.02	New	0	±0
Spanish Alternative (AES)	151	0.02	New	0	±0
Blank ballots	5,733	0.91	–0.17		
Total	627,898			17	+1
Valid votes	627,898	99.48	+0.12		
Invalid votes	3,274	0.52	–0.12		
Votes cast / turnout	631,172	56.33	–14.86		
Abstentions	489,271	43.67	+14.86		
Registered voters	1,120,443				
Sources
Footnotes: ^{1} Andalusian Party results are compared to Andalusian Coalition totals in the 2008 election.

=== 2008 ===
Summary of the 9 March 2008 Parliament of Andalusia election results in Málaga
Parties and alliances	Popular vote			Seats	
Parties and alliances	Votes	%	±pp	Total	+/−
People's Party (PP)	332,265	43.59	+9.01	8	+2
Spanish Socialist Workers' Party of Andalusia (PSOE–A)	329,102	43.18	–4.28	7	–1
United Left/The Greens–Assembly for Andalusia (IULV–CA)	54,254	7.12	–0.43	1	±0
Andalusian Coalition (CA)^{1}	21,334	2.80	–5.29	0	–1
The Greens (LV)	6,025	0.79	New	0	±0
Union, Progress and Democracy (UPyD)	5,268	0.69	New	0	±0
Citizens–Party of the Citizenry (C's)	1,882	0.25	New	0	±0
Andalusian Convergence (CAnda)	1,192	0.16	New	0	±0
Communist Party of the Andalusian People (PCPA)	1,002	0.13	New	0	±0
Republican Left (IR)	867	0.11	–0.03	0	±0
Humanist Party (PH)	851	0.11	–0.04	0	±0
Blank ballots	8,195	1.08	–0.46		
Total	762,237			16	±0
Valid votes	762,237	99.36	±0.00		
Invalid votes	4,947	0.64	±0.00		
Votes cast / turnout	767,184	71.19	–0.51		
Abstentions	310,476	28.81	+0.51		
Registered voters	1,077,660				
Sources
Footnotes: ^{1} Andalusian Coalition results are compared to the combined totals of Andalusian Party, Andalusian Forum and Socialist Party of Andalusia in the 2004 election.

=== 2004 ===
Summary of the 14 March 2004 Parliament of Andalusia election results in Málaga
Parties and alliances	Popular vote			Seats	
Parties and alliances	Votes	%	±pp	Total	+/−
Spanish Socialist Workers' Party of Andalusia (PSOE–A)	349,404	47.46	+7.36	8	+1
People's Party (PP)	254,571	34.58	–6.52	6	–1
United Left/The Greens–Assembly for Andalusia (IULV–CA)	55,624	7.55	–1.37	1	±0
Andalusian Party (PA)	49,017	6.66	–0.66	1	±0
Andalusian Forum (FA)	5,977	0.81	New	0	±0
Socialist Party of Andalusia (PSA)	4,599	0.62	New	0	±0
New Andalusian Green Left (NIVA)	1,605	0.22	New	0	±0
Humanist Party (PH)	1,087	0.15	±0.00	0	±0
Republican Left (IR)	1,050	0.14	New	0	±0
Andalusia Assembly (A)	877	0.12	–0.04	0	±0
Spanish Phalanx of the CNSO (FE de las JONS)	600	0.08	New	0	±0
National Union (UN)	523	0.07	+0.01	0	±0
Blank ballots	11,326	1.54	+0.13		
Total	736,260			16	±0
Valid votes	736,260	99.36	+0.04		
Invalid votes	4,742	0.64	–0.04		
Votes cast / turnout	741,002	71.70	+6.75		
Abstentions	292,537	28.30	–6.75		
Registered voters	1,033,539				

=== 2000 ===
Summary of the 12 March 2000 Parliament of Andalusia election results in Málaga
Parties and alliances	Popular vote			Seats	
Parties and alliances	Votes	%	±pp	Total	+/−
People's Party (PP)	266,755	41.10	+3.76	7	+1
Spanish Socialist Workers' Party of Andalusia (PSOE–A)	260,273	40.10	+0.54	7	+1
United Left/The Greens–Assembly for Andalusia (IULV–CA)	57,885	8.92	–6.88	1	–1
Andalusian Party (PA)	47,500	7.32	+1.62	1	±0
Andalusian Left (IA)	1,954	0.30	New	0	±0
Green Ecologist Alternative of Marbella and San Pedro de Alcántara (AEV)	1,304	0.20	New	0	±0
Andalusian Nation (NA)	1,059	0.16	+0.01	0	±0
Andalusia Assembly (A)	1,016	0.16	New	0	±0
Humanist Party (PH)	992	0.15	+0.03	0	±0
The Phalanx (FE)	712	0.11	New	0	±0
National Union (UN)	415	0.06	New	0	±0
Blank ballots	9,165	1.41	+0.53		
Total	649,030			16	+1
Valid votes	649,030	99.32	–0.08		
Invalid votes	4,468	0.68	+0.08		
Votes cast / turnout	653,498	64.95	–9.84		
Abstentions	352,709	35.05	+9.84		
Registered voters	1,006,207				

=== 1996 ===
Summary of the 3 March 1996 Parliament of Andalusia election results in Málaga
Parties and alliances	Popular vote			Seats	
Parties and alliances	Votes	%	±pp	Total	+/−
Spanish Socialist Workers' Party of Andalusia (PSOE–A)	270,977	39.56	+5.25	6	±0
People's Party (PP)	255,778	37.34	+0.80	6	±0
United Left/The Greens–Assembly for Andalusia (IULV–CA)	108,259	15.80	–6.56	2	–2
Andalusian Party (PA)^{1}	39,041	5.70	+1.04	1	+1
Communist Party of the Andalusian People (PCPA)	1,083	0.16	–0.13	0	±0
Andalusian Nation (NA)	1,012	0.15	–0.17	0	±0
Humanist Party (PH)	817	0.12	–0.09	0	±0
Democratic Andalusian Unity (UAD)	750	0.11	New	0	±0
Centrist Union (UC)	650	0.09	–0.29	0	±0
Authentic Spanish Phalanx (FEA)	616	0.09	New	0	±0
Blank ballots	6,060	0.88	+0.07		
Total	685,043			15	–1
Valid votes	685,043	99.40	–0.04		
Invalid votes	4,107	0.60	+0.04		
Votes cast / turnout	689,150	74.79	+10.58		
Abstentions	232,264	25.21	–10.58		
Registered voters	921,414				
Sources
Footnotes: ^{1} Andalusian Party results are compared to Andalusian Coalition–Andalusian Power totals in the 1994 election.

=== 1994 ===
Summary of the 12 June 1994 Parliament of Andalusia election results in Málaga
Parties and alliances	Popular vote			Seats	
Parties and alliances	Votes	%	±pp	Total	+/−
People's Party (PP)	207,406	36.54	+14.56	6	+2
Spanish Socialist Workers' Party of Andalusia (PSOE–A)	194,768	34.31	–14.95	6	–3
United Left/The Greens–Assembly for Andalusia (IULV–CA)	126,946	22.36	+7.79	4	+2
Andalusian Coalition–Andalusian Power (PA–PAP)^{1}	26,454	4.66	–4.13	0	–1
Forum–Democratic and Social Centre (Foro–CDS)	2,149	0.38	–1.36	0	±0
Andalusian Nation (NA)^{2}	1,813	0.32	+0.26	0	±0
Communist Party of the Andalusian People (PCPA)	1,623	0.29	+0.10	0	±0
Humanist Party (PH)	1,176	0.21	+0.13	0	±0
Spanish Phalanx of the CNSO (FE–JONS)	705	0.12	±0.00	0	±0
Blank ballots	4,607	0.81	+0.35		
Total	567,647			16	±0
Valid votes	567,647	99.44	–0.13		
Invalid votes	3,190	0.56	+0.13		
Votes cast / turnout	570,837	64.21	+12.23		
Abstentions	318,115	35.79	–12.23		
Registered voters	888,952				
Sources
Footnotes: ^{1} Andalusian Coalition–Andalusian Power results are compared to Andalusian Party totals in the 1990 election.; ^{2} Andalusian Nation results are compared to Andalusian Front of Liberation totals in the 1990 election.

=== 1990 ===
Summary of the 23 June 1990 Parliament of Andalusia election results in Málaga
Parties and alliances	Popular vote			Seats	
Parties and alliances	Votes	%	±pp	Total	+/−
Spanish Socialist Workers' Party of Andalusia (PSOE–A)	201,865	49.26	+2.44	9	+1
People's Party (PP)^{1}	90,081	21.98	+0.81	4	±0
United Left–Assembly for Andalusia (IU–CA)	59,727	14.57	–5.87	2	–1
Andalusian Party (PA)	36,028	8.79	+4.21	1	+1
Democratic and Social Centre (CDS)	7,117	1.74	–1.67	0	±0
Greens of Andalusia (VA)	2,844	0.69	New	0	±0
The Ecologist Greens (LVE)	2,769	0.68	New	0	±0
Socialist Democracy (DS)	2,134	0.52	New	0	±0
Workers' Party of Spain–Communist Unity (PTE–UC)^{2}	1,603	0.39	–0.95	0	±0
Ruiz-Mateos Group (ARM)	1,462	0.36	New	0	±0
Communist Party of the Andalusian People (PCPA)	784	0.19	New	0	±0
Spanish Phalanx of the CNSO (FE–JONS)	474	0.12	New	0	±0
Communist Party of Spain (Marxist–Leninist) (PCE (m–l))	438	0.11	New	0	±0
Humanist Party (PH)	346	0.08	–0.15	0	±0
Andalusian Front of Liberation (FAL)	256	0.06	New	0	±0
Blank ballots	1,869	0.46	+0.08		
Total	409,797			16	+1
Valid votes	409,797	99.57	+1.18		
Invalid votes	1,754	0.43	–1.18		
Votes cast / turnout	411,551	51.98	–15.28		
Abstentions	380,173	48.02	+15.28		
Registered voters	791,724				
Sources
Footnotes: ^{1} People's Party results are compared to People's Coalition totals in the 1986 election.; ^{2} Workers' Party of Spain–Communist Unity results are compared to Communists' Unity Board totals in the 1986 election.

=== 1986 ===
Summary of the 22 June 1986 Parliament of Andalusia election results in Málaga
Parties and alliances	Popular vote			Seats	
Parties and alliances	Votes	%	±pp	Total	+/−
Spanish Socialist Workers' Party of Andalusia (PSOE–A)	232,021	46.82	–7.00	8	–1
People's Coalition (AP–PDP–PL)^{1}	104,909	21.17	+3.16	4	+1
United Left–Assembly for Andalusia (IU–CA)^{2}	101,279	20.44	+13.15	3	+2
Andalusian Party (PA)	22,680	4.58	–2.29	0	–1
Democratic and Social Centre (CDS)	16,877	3.41	New	0	±0
Communists' Unity Board (MUC)	6,622	1.34	New	0	±0
Socialist Party of the Andalusian People (PSPA)	3,746	0.76	New	0	±0
Democratic Reformist Party (PRD)	3,430	0.69	New	0	±0
Humanist Party (PH)	1,115	0.23	New	0	±0
Andalusian Liberation (LA)	986	0.20	New	0	±0
Union of the Democratic Centre (UCD)	n/a	n/a	–10.70	0	–1
Blank ballots	1,888	0.38	+0.01		
Total	495,553			15	±0
Valid votes	495,553	98.39	–0.49		
Invalid votes	8,099	1.61	+0.49		
Votes cast / turnout	503,652	67.26	+6.14		
Abstentions	245,156	32.74	–6.14		
Registered voters	748,808				
Sources
Footnotes: ^{1} People's Coalition results are compared to People's Alliance–People's Democratic Party totals in the 1982 election.; ^{2} United Left–Assembly for Andalusia results are compared to Communist Party of Andalusia totals in the 1982 election.

=== 1982 ===
Summary of the 23 May 1982 Parliament of Andalusia election results in Málaga
Parties and alliances	Popular vote			Seats	
Parties and alliances	Votes	%	±pp	Total	+/−
Spanish Socialist Workers' Party of Andalusia (PSOE–A)	216,098	53.82	n/a	9	n/a
People's Alliance (AP)	72,306	18.01	n/a	3	n/a
Union of the Democratic Centre (UCD)	42,960	10.70	n/a	1	n/a
Communist Party of Andalusia (PCA–PCE)	29,266	7.29	n/a	1	n/a
Socialist Party of Andalusia–Andalusian Party (PSA–PA)	27,602	6.87	n/a	1	n/a
New Force (FN)	3,892	0.97	n/a	0	n/a
Spanish Communist Workers' Party (PCOE)	3,578	0.89	n/a	0	n/a
Communist Movement of Andalusia (MCA)	1,130	0.28	n/a	0	n/a
Communist Unification of Spain (UCE)	1,063	0.26	n/a	0	n/a
Communist Party of Spain (Marxist–Leninist) (PCE (m–l))	854	0.21	n/a	0	n/a
Spanish Phalanx of the CNSO (FE–JONS)	781	0.19	n/a	0	n/a
Falangist Movement of Spain (MFE)	527	0.13	n/a	0	n/a
Communist Organization of Spain (Red Flag) (OCE–BR)	10	0.00	n/a	0	n/a
Blank ballots	1,468	0.37	n/a		
Total	401,535			15	n/a
Valid votes	401,535	98.88	n/a		
Invalid votes	4,549	1.12	n/a		
Votes cast / turnout	406,084	61.12	n/a		
Abstentions	258,363	38.88	n/a		
Registered voters	664,447				

== Bibliography ==
- Real Decreto-ley 20/1977, de 18 de marzo, sobre Normas Electorales (Royal Decree-Law 20/1977). Official State Gazette (in Spanish). 18 March 1977. BOE-A-1977-7445.
- Ley Orgánica 6/1981, de 30 de diciembre, de Estatuto de Autonomía para Andalucía (Organic Law 6/1981). Official State Gazette (in Spanish). 30 December 1981. BOE-A-1982-633.
- Decreto 18/1982, de ocho de Marzo, por el que se convocan Elecciones al Parlamento de Andalucía (PDF) (Decree 18/1982). Official Gazette of the Regional Government of Andalusia (in Spanish). 8 March 1982.
- Ley Orgánica 5/1985, de 19 de junio, del Régimen Electoral General (Organic Law 5/1985). Official State Gazette (in Spanish). 19 June 1985. BOE-A-1985-11672.
- Ley 1/1986, de 2 de enero, Electoral de Andalucía (Law 1/1986). Official State Gazette (in Spanish). 2 January 1986. BOE-A-1986-2788.
- Ley Orgánica 2/2007, de 19 de marzo, de reforma del Estatuto de Autonomía para Andalucía (Organic Law 2/2007). Official State Gazette (in Spanish). 19 March 2007. BOE-A-2007-5825.
