= Granada (Parliament of Andalusia constituency) =

Coordinates: 37°15′N 3°15′W

- Parliament of Andalusia; Electoral constituency
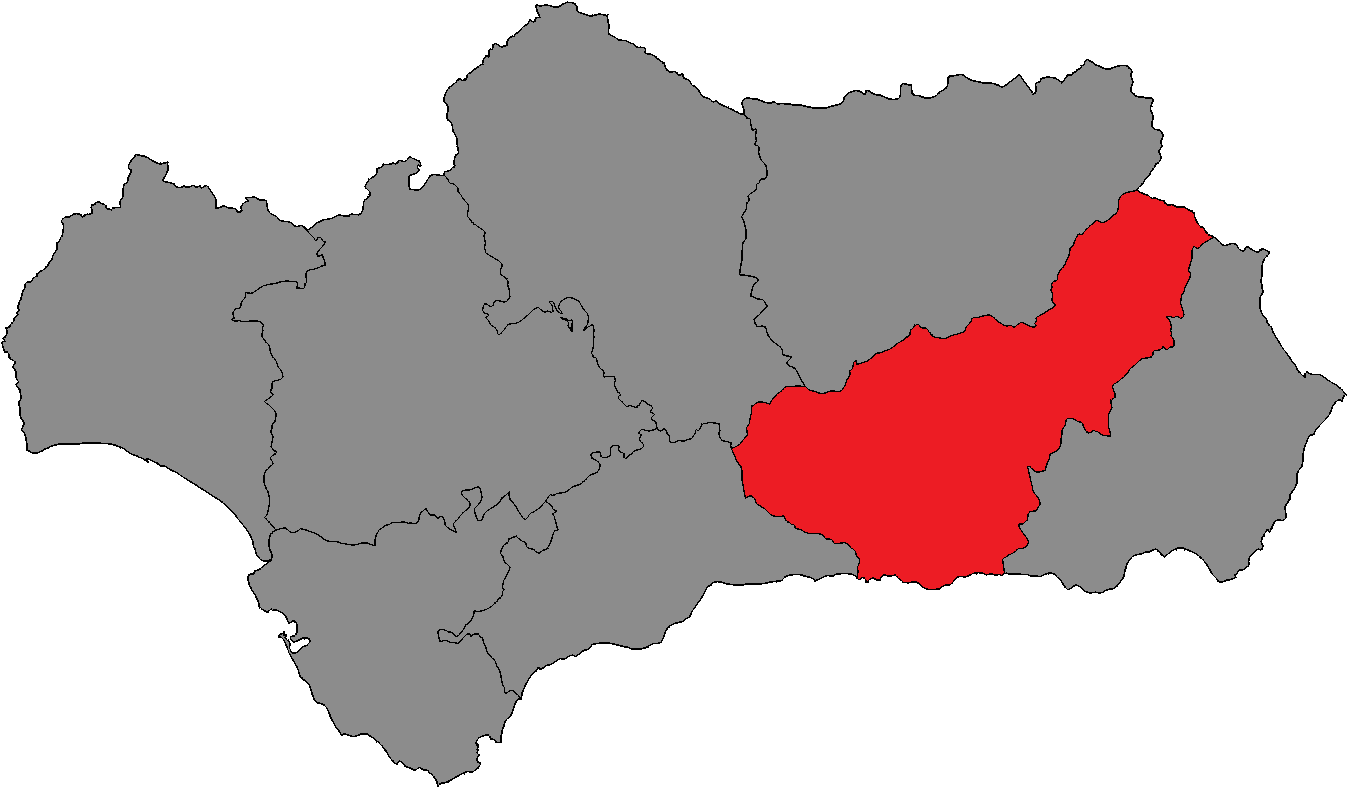
- Location of Granada within Andalusia
- Province: Granada
- Autonomous community: Andalusia
- Population: ▲942,618 (2025)
- Electorate: ▲786,040 (2026)
- Major settlements: Granada, Motril

Current constituency
- Created: 1982
- Seats: 13
- Members: PP (6); PSOE–A (3); Vox (2); AA (1); PorA (1)

Granada is one of the eight constituencies (Spanish: circunscripciones) represented in the Parliament of Andalusia, the regional legislature of the Autonomous Community of Andalusia. The constituency currently elects 13 deputies. Its boundaries correspond to those of the Spanish province of Granada. The electoral system uses the D'Hondt method and closed-list proportional representation, with a minimum threshold of three percent.

== Electoral system ==
The constituency was established under the Statute of Autonomy for Andalusia of 1981 and was first contested in the 1982 regional election. The Statute (reformed in 2007) provides for the eight provinces in Andalusia—Almería, Cádiz, Córdoba, Granada, Huelva, Jaén, Málaga and Seville—to be set as multi-member constituencies in the Parliament of Andalusia, each of which is assigned an initial minimum of eight seats and the remaining ones are distributed in proportion to population (with the number of seats in each province not exceeding two times that of any other). The exception was the 1982 election, when each constituency was allocated a fixed number of seats. Seats are elected using the D'Hondt method and closed-list proportional voting, with a three percent-threshold of valid votes (including blank ballots) in each constituency. The use of this electoral method may result in a higher effective threshold depending on district magnitude and vote distribution. The law does not provide for by-elections to fill vacant seats; instead, any vacancies arising after the proclamation of candidates and during the legislative term are filled by the next candidates on the party lists or, when required, by designated substitutes.

Voting is based on universal suffrage, comprising all Spanish nationals over 18 years of age, registered in the constituency and with full political rights. Amendments in 2011 required non-resident citizens to apply for voting, a system known as "begged" voting (Spanish: Voto rogado), which was abolished in 2022 and attributed responsibility for a major decrease in the turnout of Spaniards abroad during the years it was in force. Additionally, those legally incapacitated were also barred from voting before amendments in 2018 granted them the right to vote.

The electoral law allows for parties and federations registered in the interior ministry, alliances and groupings of electors to present lists of candidates. Parties and federations intending to form an alliance are required to inform the relevant electoral commission within 10 days of the election call—15 before 1985—whereas groupings of electors need to secure the signature of at least one percent of the electorate in the constituencies for which they seek election (before 1985 this was one permille, with a compulsory minimum of 500 signatures), disallowing electors from signing for more than one list. Amendments in 2005 required a balanced composition of men and women in the electoral lists through the use of a zipper system.

== Deputies ==
Deputies 1982–present
Key to parties PCA–PCE IU–CA IULV–CA Adelante AA PorA Podemos PA PSOE–A Cs UCD PP CP AP Vox
Parliament	Election	Distribution
1st	1982	1 / 8 / 2 / 2
2nd	1986	2 / 7 / 4
3rd	1990	1 / 1 / 7 / 4
4th	1994	2 / 5 / 6
5th	1996	1 / 7 / 5
6th	2000	1 / 6 / 6
7th	2004	1 / 7 / 5
8th	2008	1 / 6 / 6
9th	2012	1 / 6 / 6
10th	2015	1 / 2 / 5 / 1 / 4
11th	2018	2 / 4 / 3 / 3 / 1
12th	2022	1 / 4 / 6 / 2
13th	2026	1 / 1 / 3 / 6 / 2

== Regional elections ==
=== 2026 ===
Summary of the 17 May 2026 Parliament of Andalusia election results in Granada
Parties and alliances	Popular vote			Seats	
Parties and alliances	Votes	%	±pp	Total	+/−
People's Party (PP)	203,701	42.38	+0.22	6	±0
Spanish Socialist Workers' Party of Andalusia (PSOE–A)	116,786	24.30	−1.11	3	−1
Vox (Vox)	72,553	15.09	−0.32	2	±0
Forward Andalusia (Adelante Andalucía)	32,811	6.83	+3.65	1	+1
For Andalusia (IU–Podemos–MS–IdPA–VQ–ALTER–AV)	31,015	6.45	−1.29	1	±0
The Party is Over (SALF)	11,092	2.31	New	0	±0
Animalist Party with the Environment (PACMA)^{1}	2,431	0.51	−0.25	0	±0
Andalusians–Andalusian People–Convergence–Commitment (Andalucistas–PA)^{2}	1,529	0.32	+0.05	0	±0
Blank Seats to Leave Empty Seats (EB)	1,225	0.25	+0.13	0	±0
For a Fairer World (M+J)	684	0.14	+0.01	0	±0
Communist Party of the Andalusian People (PCPA)	587	0.12	±0.00	0	±0
Spanish Phalanx of the CNSO (FE de las JONS)	485	0.10	New	0	±0
Communist Party of the Workers of Spain (PCTE)	458	0.10	−0.01	0	±0
Retirees Party for the Future. Dignity and Democracy (JUFUDI)	428	0.09	+0.01	0	±0
Andalusian Nation (NA)	306	0.06	−0.01	0	±0
Revolutionary Anticapitalist Left (IZAR)	254	0.05	±0.00	0	±0
Blank ballots	4,333	0.90	−0.01		
Total	480,678			13	±0
Valid votes	480,678	98.91	+0.11		
Invalid votes	5,283	1.09	−0.11		
Votes cast / turnout	485,961	61.82	+6.17		
Abstentions	300,083	38.18	−6.17		
Registered voters	786,044				
Sources
Footnotes: ^{1} Animalist Party with the Environment results are compared to Animalist Party Against Mistreatment of Animals totals in the 2022 election.; ^{2} Andalusians–Andalusian People–Convergence–Commitment results are compared to Arise Andalusians Coalition in the 2022 election.

=== 2022 ===
Summary of the 19 June 2022 Parliament of Andalusia election results in Granada
Parties and alliances	Popular vote			Seats	
Parties and alliances	Votes	%	±pp	Total	+/−
People's Party (PP)	176,349	42.16	+19.11	6	+3
Spanish Socialist Workers' Party of Andalusia (PSOE–A)	106,307	25.41	–1.51	4	±0
Vox (Vox)	64,447	15.41	+4.04	2	+1
United Left–More Country–Greens Equo–Initiative: For Andalusia (PorA)^{1}	32,372	7.74	n/a	1	±0
Forward Andalusia–Andalusians (Adelante Andalucía–Andalucistas)^{1}	13,293	3.18	n/a	0	–1
Citizens–Party of the Citizenry (Cs)	12,358	2.95	–15.46	0	–3
Animalist Party Against Mistreatment of Animals (PACMA)	3,167	0.76	–1.02	0	±0
Together for Granada–The Party of the Granadexit (JxG)	1,308	0.31	New	0	±0
Arise Andalusians Coalition (AL)^{2}	1,144	0.27	–0.40	0	±0
For a Fairer World (PUM+J)	549	0.13	New	0	±0
Communist Party of the Andalusian People (PCPA)	509	0.12	–0.08	0	±0
Socialist Republican Coalition for Andalusia (CRSxA)	497	0.12	New	0	±0
Blank Seats (EB)	484	0.12	New	0	±0
Communist Party of the Workers of Spain (PCTE)	473	0.11	New	0	±0
Retirees Party for the Future. Dignity and Democracy (JUFUDI)	348	0.08	New	0	±0
Andalusian Nation (NA)	283	0.07	–0.06	0	±0
Zero Cuts–Left in Positive (Recortes Cero–IZQP)	257	0.06	–0.17	0	±0
Revolutionary Anticapitalist Left (IZAR)	200	0.05	–0.02	0	±0
Enough is Enough! (Federación Basta Ya!)	163	0.04	New	0	±0
Blank ballots	3,796	0.91	–0.48		
Total	418,304			13	±0
Valid votes	418,304	98.80	+2.07		
Invalid votes	5,082	1.20	–2.07		
Votes cast / turnout	423,386	55.65	–1.37		
Abstentions	337,353	44.35	+1.37		
Registered voters	760,739				
Sources
Footnotes: ^{1} Within the Forward–We Can–United Left–Spring–Andalusian Left alliance in the 2018 election.; ^{2} Arise Andalusians Coalition results are compared to the combined totals of Andalusia by Herself and Andalusian Convergence in the 2018 election.

=== 2018 ===
Summary of the 2 December 2018 Parliament of Andalusia election results in Granada
Parties and alliances	Popular vote			Seats	
Parties and alliances	Votes	%	±pp	Total	+/−
Spanish Socialist Workers' Party of Andalusia (PSOE–A)	111,380	26.92	–7.67	4	–1
People's Party (PP)	95,379	23.05	–6.95	3	–1
Citizens–Party of the Citizenry (Cs)	76,176	18.41	+8.82	3	+2
Forward–We Can–United Left–Spring–Andalusian Left (Adelante Andalucía)^{1}	62,447	15.09	–4.95	2	–1
Vox (Vox)	47,064	11.37	+10.96	1	+1
Animalist Party Against Mistreatment of Animals (PACMA)	7,375	1.78	+1.15	0	±0
Equo Greens–Andalusia Initiative (Equo–Iniciativa)	1,763	0.43	New	0	±0
Andalusia by Herself (AxSí)^{2}	1,553	0.38	–0.83	0	±0
Andalusian Convergence (CAnda)	1,189	0.29	New	0	±0
Zero Cuts–For a Fairer World–Green Group (Recortes Cero–M+J–GV)^{3}	950	0.23	+0.01	0	±0
Communist Party of the Andalusian People (PCPA)	845	0.20	+0.10	0	±0
Union, Progress and Democracy (UPyD)	748	0.18	–1.66	0	±0
Andalusian Nation (NA)	541	0.13	New	0	±0
United and Socialists+ for Democracy (Unidos SI–DEF)	326	0.08	New	0	±0
Revolutionary Anticapitalist Left (IZAR)	280	0.07	New	0	±0
Blank ballots	5,763	1.39	+0.23		
Total	413,779			13	±0
Valid votes	413,779	96.73	–2.29		
Invalid votes	13,976	3.27	+2.29		
Votes cast / turnout	427,755	57.02	–4.37		
Abstentions	322,377	42.98	+4.37		
Registered voters	750,132				
Sources
Footnotes: ^{1} Forward–We Can–United Left–Spring–Andalusian Left results are compared to the combined totals of We Can and United Left/The Greens–Assembly for Andalusia in the 2015 election.; ^{2} Andalusia by Herself results are compared to Andalusian Party totals in the 2015 election.; ^{3} Zero Cuts–For a Fairer World–Green Group results are compared to the combined totals of For a Fairer World and Zero Cuts in the 2015 election.

=== 2015 ===
Summary of the 22 March 2015 Parliament of Andalusia election results in Granada
Parties and alliances	Popular vote			Seats	
Parties and alliances	Votes	%	±pp	Total	+/−
Spanish Socialist Workers' Party of Andalusia (PSOE–A)	157,229	34.59	–4.92	5	–1
People's Party (PP)	136,383	30.00	–13.46	4	–2
We Can (Podemos)	63,350	13.94	New	2	+2
Citizens–Party of the Citizenry (C's)	43,491	9.57	New	1	+1
United Left/The Greens–Assembly for Andalusia (IULV–CA)	27,709	6.10	–3.87	1	±0
Union, Progress and Democracy (UPyD)	8,377	1.84	–1.60	0	±0
Andalusian Party (PA)	5,486	1.21	+0.07	0	±0
Animalist Party Against Mistreatment of Animals (PACMA)	2,880	0.63	+0.45	0	±0
Vox (Vox)	1,876	0.41	New	0	±0
Spanish Phalanx of the CNSO (FE de las JONS)	598	0.13	+0.06	0	±0
For a Fairer World (PUM+J)	552	0.12	+0.05	0	±0
People's Welfare Party (PBG)	498	0.11	New	0	±0
Zero Cuts (Recortes Cero)	445	0.10	New	0	±0
Communist Party of the Peoples of Spain (PCPE)	440	0.10	–0.02	0	±0
Blank ballots	5,251	1.16	+0.35		
Total	454,565			13	±0
Valid votes	454,565	99.02	–0.39		
Invalid votes	4,478	0.98	+0.39		
Votes cast / turnout	459,043	61.39	+1.05		
Abstentions	288,734	38.61	–1.05		
Registered voters	747,777				

=== 2012 ===
Summary of the 25 March 2012 Parliament of Andalusia election results in Granada
Parties and alliances	Popular vote			Seats	
Parties and alliances	Votes	%	±pp	Total	+/−
People's Party (PP)	198,768	43.46	+1.48	6	±0
Spanish Socialist Workers' Party of Andalusia (PSOE–A)	180,690	39.51	–6.59	6	±0
United Left/The Greens–Assembly for Andalusia (IULV–CA)	45,591	9.97	+2.69	1	±0
Union, Progress and Democracy (UPyD)	15,718	3.44	+2.75	0	±0
Andalusian Party (PA)^{1}	5,208	1.14	–0.44	0	±0
Equo (Equo)	2,203	0.48	New	0	±0
Animalist Party Against Mistreatment of Animals (PACMA)	846	0.18	New	0	±0
Andalusian Convergence (CAnda)	762	0.17	–0.10	0	±0
Regionalist Party for Eastern Andalusia (PRAO)	666	0.15	New	0	±0
Blank Seats (EB)	627	0.14	New	0	±0
Communist Party of the Peoples of Spain (PCPE)	542	0.12	+0.03	0	±0
Hartos.org (Hartos.org)	501	0.11	New	0	±0
We Won't Pay this Crisis (ECNP)	341	0.07	New	0	±0
For a Fairer World (PUM+J)	333	0.07	New	0	±0
Spanish Phalanx of the CNSO (FE de las JONS)	312	0.07	±0.00	0	±0
Internationalist Solidarity and Self-Management (SAIn)	230	0.05	–0.01	0	±0
Communist Unification of Spain (UCE)	127	0.03	New	0	±0
Liberal Democratic Centre (CDL)	104	0.02	New	0	±0
Spanish Alternative (AES)	103	0.02	New	0	±0
Blank ballots	3,691	0.81	–0.15		
Total	457,363			13	±0
Valid votes	457,363	99.41	+0.07		
Invalid votes	2,716	0.59	–0.07		
Votes cast / turnout	460,079	62.44	–11.72		
Abstentions	276,795	37.56	+11.72		
Registered voters	736,874				
Sources
Footnotes: ^{1} Andalusian Party results are compared to Andalusian Coalition totals in the 2008 election.

=== 2008 ===
Summary of the 9 March 2008 Parliament of Andalusia election results in Granada
Parties and alliances	Popular vote			Seats	
Parties and alliances	Votes	%	±pp	Total	+/−
Spanish Socialist Workers' Party of Andalusia (PSOE–A)	243,685	46.10	–2.89	6	–1
People's Party (PP)	221,885	41.98	+6.56	6	+1
United Left/The Greens–Assembly for Andalusia (IULV–CA)	38,497	7.28	+0.19	1	±0
Andalusian Coalition (CA)^{1}	8,350	1.58	–5.10	0	±0
Union, Progress and Democracy (UPyD)	3,639	0.69	New	0	±0
The Greens (LV)	3,502	0.66	New	0	±0
Andalusian Convergence (CAnda)	1,439	0.27	New	0	±0
Citizens–Party of the Citizenry (C's)	657	0.12	New	0	±0
Communist Party of the Andalusian People (PCPA)	502	0.09	New	0	±0
Republican Left (IR)	354	0.07	New	0	±0
Spanish Phalanx of the CNSO (FE de las JONS)	353	0.07	±0.00	0	±0
Humanist Party (PH)	352	0.07	–0.06	0	±0
Internationalist Solidarity and Self-Management (SAIn)	296	0.06	New	0	±0
Blank ballots	5,068	0.96	–0.39		
Total	528,579			13	±0
Valid votes	528,579	99.34	+0.01		
Invalid votes	3,509	0.66	–0.01		
Votes cast / turnout	532,088	74.16	–1.45		
Abstentions	185,391	25.84	+1.45		
Registered voters	717,479				
Sources
Footnotes: ^{1} Andalusian Coalition results are compared to the combined totals of Andalusian Party, Andalusian Forum and Socialist Party of Andalusia in the 2004 election.

=== 2004 ===
Summary of the 14 March 2004 Parliament of Andalusia election results in Granada
Parties and alliances	Popular vote			Seats	
Parties and alliances	Votes	%	±pp	Total	+/−
Spanish Socialist Workers' Party of Andalusia (PSOE–A)	255,465	48.99	+4.29	7	+1
People's Party (PP)	184,691	35.42	–5.44	5	–1
United Left/The Greens–Assembly for Andalusia (IULV–CA)	36,949	7.09	–0.28	1	±0
Andalusian Party (PA)	22,541	4.32	–0.87	0	±0
Andalusian Forum (FA)	7,785	1.49	New	0	±0
Socialist Party of Andalusia (PSA)	4,560	0.87	New	0	±0
Party of Precarious Workers (PTPRE)	860	0.16	New	0	±0
Humanist Party (PH)	696	0.13	+0.02	0	±0
Andalusia Assembly (A)	503	0.10	±0.00	0	±0
Spanish Phalanx of the CNSO (FE de las JONS)	384	0.07	New	0	±0
Blank ballots	7,035	1.39	+0.18		
Total	521,469			13	±0
Valid votes	521,469	99.33	+0.06		
Invalid votes	3,541	0.67	–0.06		
Votes cast / turnout	525,010	75.61	+6.09		
Abstentions	169,323	24.39	–6.09		
Registered voters	694,333				

=== 2000 ===
Summary of the 12 March 2000 Parliament of Andalusia election results in Granada
Parties and alliances	Popular vote			Seats	
Parties and alliances	Votes	%	±pp	Total	+/−
Spanish Socialist Workers' Party of Andalusia (PSOE–A)	214,416	44.70	–0.16	6	–1
People's Party (PP)	195,989	40.86	+3.34	6	+1
United Left/The Greens–Assembly for Andalusia (IULV–CA)	35,335	7.37	–5.07	1	±0
Andalusian Party (PA)	24,900	5.19	+1.32	0	±0
Andalusian Left (IA)	1,309	0.27	New	0	±0
Andalusian Nation (NA)	603	0.13	+0.02	0	±0
Humanist Party (PH)	534	0.11	+0.03	0	±0
Andalusia Assembly (A)	495	0.10	New	0	±0
Party of the Separated and Divorced (PSD)	486	0.10	New	0	±0
Blank ballots	5,631	1.17	+0.46		
Total	479,698			13	±0
Valid votes	479,698	99.27	–0.17		
Invalid votes	3,520	0.73	+0.17		
Votes cast / turnout	483,218	69.52	–9.13		
Abstentions	211,812	30.48	+9.13		
Registered voters	695,030				

=== 1996 ===
Summary of the 3 March 1996 Parliament of Andalusia election results in Granada
Parties and alliances	Popular vote			Seats	
Parties and alliances	Votes	%	±pp	Total	+/−
Spanish Socialist Workers' Party of Andalusia (PSOE–A)	228,887	44.86	+6.56	7	+2
People's Party (PP)	191,450	37.52	–1.13	5	–1
United Left/The Greens–Assembly for Andalusia (IULV–CA)	63,453	12.44	–4.39	1	–1
Andalusian Party (PA)^{1}	19,728	3.87	–0.55	0	±0
Communist Party of the Andalusian People (PCPA)	976	0.19	–0.11	0	±0
Centrist Union (UC)	630	0.12	–0.23	0	±0
Andalusian Nation (NA)	559	0.11	–0.08	0	±0
Authentic Spanish Phalanx (FEA)	541	0.11	New	0	±0
Humanist Party (PH)	396	0.08	–0.03	0	±0
Blank ballots	3,625	0.71	–0.04		
Total	510,245			13	±0
Valid votes	510,245	99.44	+0.06		
Invalid votes	2,880	0.56	–0.06		
Votes cast / turnout	513,125	78.65	+9.90		
Abstentions	139,264	21.35	–9.90		
Registered voters	652,389				
Sources
Footnotes: ^{1} Andalusian Party results are compared to Andalusian Coalition–Andalusian Power totals in the 1994 election.

=== 1994 ===
Summary of the 12 June 1994 Parliament of Andalusia election results in Granada
Parties and alliances	Popular vote			Seats	
Parties and alliances	Votes	%	±pp	Total	+/−
People's Party (PP)	167,528	38.65	+10.74	6	+2
Spanish Socialist Workers' Party of Andalusia (PSOE–A)	166,026	38.30	–10.60	5	–2
United Left/The Greens–Assembly for Andalusia (IULV–CA)	72,958	16.83	+5.07	2	+1
Andalusian Coalition–Andalusian Power (PA–PAP)^{1}	19,144	4.42	–1.75	0	–1
Forum–Democratic and Social Centre (Foro–CDS)	1,534	0.35	–0.94	0	±0
Communist Party of the Andalusian People (PCPA)	1,285	0.30	+0.09	0	±0
Andalusian Nation (NA)^{2}	814	0.19	+0.14	0	±0
Humanist Party (PH)	485	0.11	+0.06	0	±0
Spanish Phalanx of the CNSO (FE–JONS)	442	0.10	–0.01	0	±0
Blank ballots	3,243	0.75	+0.37		
Total	433,459			13	±0
Valid votes	433,459	99.38	–0.24		
Invalid votes	2,714	0.62	+0.24		
Votes cast / turnout	436,173	68.75	+12.04		
Abstentions	198,289	31.25	–12.04		
Registered voters	634,462				
Sources
Footnotes: ^{1} Andalusian Coalition–Andalusian Power results are compared to Andalusian Party totals in the 1990 election.; ^{2} Andalusian Nation results are compared to Andalusian Front of Liberation totals in the 1990 election.

=== 1990 ===
Summary of the 23 June 1990 Parliament of Andalusia election results in Granada
Parties and alliances	Popular vote			Seats	
Parties and alliances	Votes	%	±pp	Total	+/−
Spanish Socialist Workers' Party of Andalusia (PSOE–A)	165,624	48.90	+3.88	7	±0
People's Party (PP)^{1}	94,545	27.91	+0.93	4	±0
United Left–Assembly for Andalusia (IU–CA)	39,836	11.76	–2.76	1	–1
Andalusian Party (PA)	20,895	6.17	+3.47	1	+1
Democratic and Social Centre (CDS)	4,382	1.29	–2.84	0	±0
Workers' Party of Spain–Communist Unity (PTE–UC)^{2}	3,589	1.06	–1.82	0	±0
Greens of Andalusia (VA)	2,077	0.61	New	0	±0
The Ecologist Greens (LVE)	1,936	0.57	New	0	±0
Ruiz-Mateos Group (ARM)	1,262	0.37	New	0	±0
Socialist Democracy (DS)	1,133	0.33	New	0	±0
Communist Party of the Andalusian People (PCPA)	723	0.21	New	0	±0
Communist Party of Spain (Marxist–Leninist) (PCE (m–l))	523	0.15	New	0	±0
Spanish Phalanx of the CNSO (FE–JONS)	374	0.11	New	0	±0
Andalusian Front of Liberation (FAL)	185	0.05	New	0	±0
Falangist Movement of Spain (MFE)	181	0.05	New	0	±0
Humanist Party (PH)	154	0.05	–0.15	0	±0
Blank ballots	1,281	0.38	+0.01		
Total	338,700			13	±0
Valid votes	338,700	99.62	+0.87		
Invalid votes	1,309	0.38	–0.87		
Votes cast / turnout	340,009	56.71	–12.53		
Abstentions	259,559	43.29	+12.53		
Registered voters	599,568				
Sources
Footnotes: ^{1} People's Party results are compared to People's Coalition totals in the 1986 election.; ^{2} Workers' Party of Spain–Communist Unity results are compared to Communists' Unity Board totals in the 1986 election.

=== 1986 ===
Summary of the 22 June 1986 Parliament of Andalusia election results in Granada
Parties and alliances	Popular vote			Seats	
Parties and alliances	Votes	%	±pp	Total	+/−
Spanish Socialist Workers' Party of Andalusia (PSOE–A)	179,533	45.02	–7.35	7	–1
People's Coalition (AP–PDP–PL)^{1}	107,612	26.98	+9.90	4	+2
United Left–Assembly for Andalusia (IU–CA)^{2}	57,895	14.52	+5.59	2	+1
Democratic and Social Centre (CDS)	16,480	4.13	New	0	±0
Communists' Unity Board (MUC)	11,503	2.88	New	0	±0
Andalusian Party (PA)	10,785	2.70	–0.15	0	±0
Socialist Party of the Andalusian People (PSPA)	9,005	2.26	New	0	±0
Democratic Reformist Party (PRD)	2,265	0.57	New	0	±0
Falangist Movement of Spain (MFE)	809	0.20	+0.06	0	±0
Humanist Party (PH)	790	0.20	New	0	±0
Andalusian Liberation (LA)	683	0.17	New	0	±0
Union of the Democratic Centre (UCD)	n/a	n/a	–14.76	0	–2
Blank ballots	1,464	0.37	+0.06		
Total	398,824			13	±0
Valid votes	398,824	98.80	–0.46		
Invalid votes	4,839	1.20	+0.46		
Votes cast / turnout	403,663	69.24	+2.03		
Abstentions	179,304	30.76	–2.03		
Registered voters	582,967				
Sources
Footnotes: ^{1} People's Coalition results are compared to People's Alliance–People's Democratic Party totals in the 1982 election.; ^{2} United Left–Assembly for Andalusia results are compared to Communist Party of Andalusia totals in the 1982 election.

=== 1982 ===
Summary of the 23 May 1982 Parliament of Andalusia election results in Granada
Parties and alliances	Popular vote			Seats	
Parties and alliances	Votes	%	±pp	Total	+/−
Spanish Socialist Workers' Party of Andalusia (PSOE–A)	183,559	52.37	n/a	8	n/a
People's Alliance (AP)	59,863	17.08	n/a	2	n/a
Union of the Democratic Centre (UCD)	51,749	14.76	n/a	2	n/a
Communist Party of Andalusia (PCA–PCE)	31,295	8.93	n/a	1	n/a
Socialist Party of Andalusia–Andalusian Party (PSA–PA)	9,986	2.85	n/a	0	n/a
New Force (FN)	6,916	1.97	n/a	0	n/a
Granadan Candidacy of Workers (CGT)	2,428	0.69	n/a	0	n/a
Spanish Phalanx of the CNSO (FE–JONS)	1,339	0.38	n/a	0	n/a
Communist Unification of Spain (UCE)	1,091	0.31	n/a	0	n/a
Communist Movement of Andalusia (MCA)	707	0.20	n/a	0	n/a
Falangist Movement of Spain (MFE)	480	0.14	n/a	0	n/a
Blank ballots	1,085	0.31	n/a		
Total	350,498			13	n/a
Valid votes	350,498	99.26	n/a		
Invalid votes	2,616	0.74	n/a		
Votes cast / turnout	353,114	67.21	n/a		
Abstentions	172,271	32.79	n/a		
Registered voters	525,385				

== Bibliography ==
- Real Decreto-ley 20/1977, de 18 de marzo, sobre Normas Electorales (Royal Decree-Law 20/1977). Official State Gazette (in Spanish). 18 March 1977. BOE-A-1977-7445.
- Ley Orgánica 6/1981, de 30 de diciembre, de Estatuto de Autonomía para Andalucía (Organic Law 6/1981). Official State Gazette (in Spanish). 30 December 1981. BOE-A-1982-633.
- Decreto 18/1982, de ocho de Marzo, por el que se convocan Elecciones al Parlamento de Andalucía (PDF) (Decree 18/1982). Official Gazette of the Regional Government of Andalusia (in Spanish). 8 March 1982.
- Ley Orgánica 5/1985, de 19 de junio, del Régimen Electoral General (Organic Law 5/1985). Official State Gazette (in Spanish). 19 June 1985. BOE-A-1985-11672.
- Ley 1/1986, de 2 de enero, Electoral de Andalucía (Law 1/1986). Official State Gazette (in Spanish). 2 January 1986. BOE-A-1986-2788.
- Ley Orgánica 2/2007, de 19 de marzo, de reforma del Estatuto de Autonomía para Andalucía (Organic Law 2/2007). Official State Gazette (in Spanish). 19 March 2007. BOE-A-2007-5825.
