= Cádiz (Parliament of Andalusia constituency) =

Coordinates: 36°30′N 5°45′W

- Parliament of Andalusia; Electoral constituency
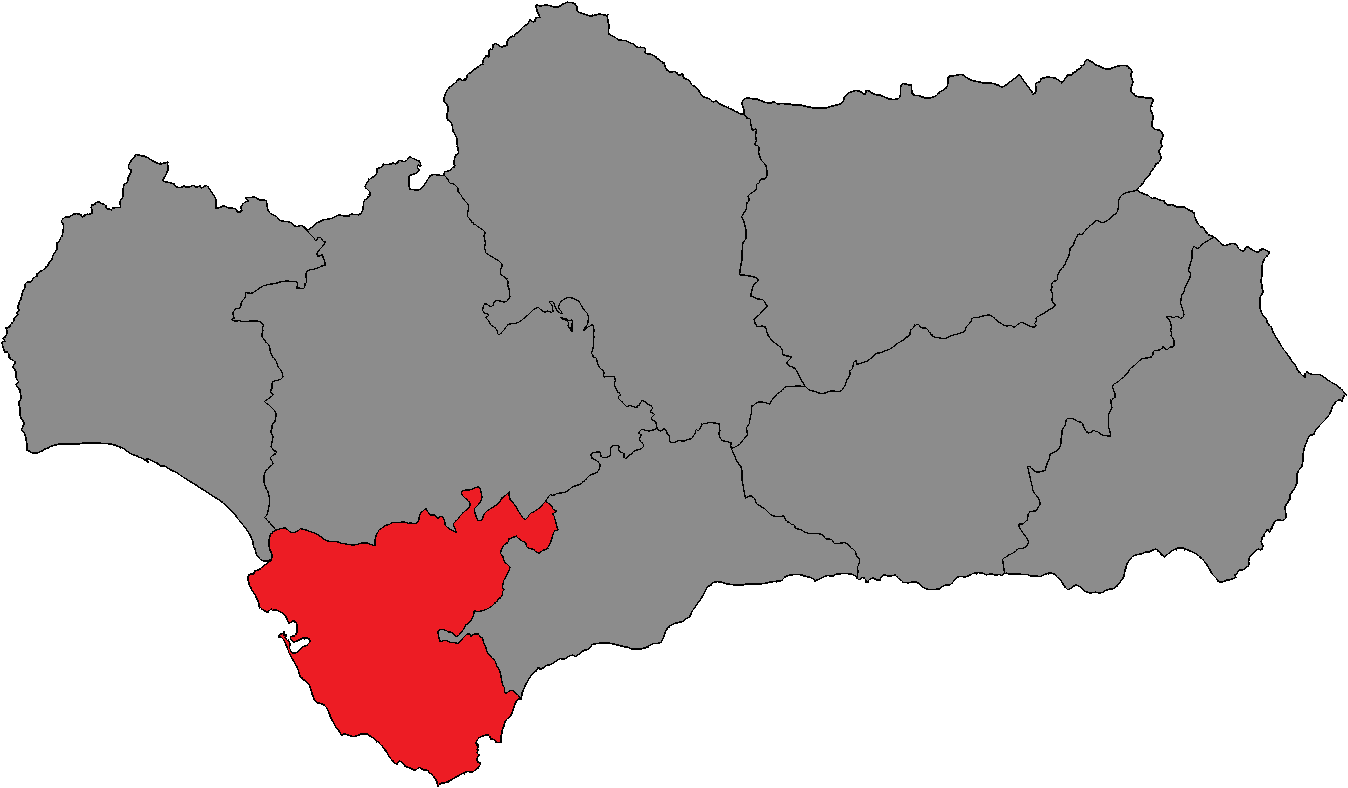
- Location of Cádiz within Andalusia
- Province: Cádiz
- Autonomous community: Andalusia
- Population: ▲1,257,041 (2025)
- Electorate: ▲1,038,171 (2026)
- Major settlements: Jerez de la Frontera, Cádiz, Algeciras, San Fernando, El Puerto de Santa María

Current constituency
- Created: 1982
- Seats: 15
- Members: PP (7); PSOE–A (3); AA (2); Vox (2); PorA (1)

Cádiz is one of the eight constituencies (Spanish: circunscripciones) represented in the Parliament of Andalusia, the regional legislature of the Autonomous Community of Andalusia. The constituency currently elects 15 deputies. Its boundaries correspond to those of the Spanish province of Cádiz. The electoral system uses the D'Hondt method and closed-list proportional representation, with a minimum threshold of three percent.

== Electoral system ==
The constituency was established under the Statute of Autonomy for Andalusia of 1981 and was first contested in the 1982 regional election. The Statute (reformed in 2007) provides for the eight provinces in Andalusia—Almería, Cádiz, Córdoba, Granada, Huelva, Jaén, Málaga and Seville—to be set as multi-member constituencies in the Parliament of Andalusia, each of which is assigned an initial minimum of eight seats and the remaining ones are distributed in proportion to population (with the number of seats in each province not exceeding two times that of any other). The exception was the 1982 election, when each constituency was allocated a fixed number of seats. Seats are elected using the D'Hondt method and closed-list proportional voting, with a three percent-threshold of valid votes (including blank ballots) in each constituency. The use of this electoral method may result in a higher effective threshold depending on district magnitude and vote distribution. The law does not provide for by-elections to fill vacant seats; instead, any vacancies arising after the proclamation of candidates and during the legislative term are filled by the next candidates on the party lists or, when required, by designated substitutes.

Voting is based on universal suffrage, comprising all Spanish nationals over 18 years of age, registered in the constituency and with full political rights. Amendments in 2011 required non-resident citizens to apply for voting, a system known as "begged" voting (Spanish: Voto rogado), which was abolished in 2022 and attributed responsibility for a major decrease in the turnout of Spaniards abroad during the years it was in force. Additionally, those legally incapacitated were also barred from voting before amendments in 2018 granted them the right to vote.

The electoral law allows for parties and federations registered in the interior ministry, alliances and groupings of electors to present lists of candidates. Parties and federations intending to form an alliance are required to inform the relevant electoral commission within 10 days of the election call—15 before 1985—whereas groupings of electors need to secure the signature of at least one percent of the electorate in the constituencies for which they seek election (before 1985 this was one permille, with a compulsory minimum of 500 signatures), disallowing electors from signing for more than one list. Amendments in 2005 required a balanced composition of men and women in the electoral lists through the use of a zipper system.

== Deputies ==
Deputies 1982–present
Key to parties PCA–PCE IU–CA IULV–CA Adelante AA PorA Podemos PA PSOE–A Cs UCD PP CP AP Vox
Parliament	Election	Distribution
1st	1982	1 / 1 / 9 / 2 / 2
2nd	1986	2 / 1 / 9 / 3
3rd	1990	1 / 4 / 8 / 2
4th	1994	3 / 2 / 5 / 5
5th	1996	2 / 2 / 6 / 5
6th	2000	1 / 2 / 6 / 6
7th	2004	1 / 1 / 8 / 5
8th	2008	1 / 8 / 6
9th	2012	2 / 6 / 7
10th	2015	1 / 3 / 6 / 1 / 4
11th	2018	3 / 4 / 3 / 3 / 2
12th	2022	1 / 1 / 3 / 8 / 2
13th	2026	2 / 1 / 3 / 7 / 2

== Regional elections ==
=== 2026 ===
Summary of the 17 May 2026 Parliament of Andalusia election results in Cádiz
Parties and alliances	Popular vote			Seats	
Parties and alliances	Votes	%	±pp	Total	+/−
People's Party (PP)	233,929	38.92	−3.55	7	−1
Spanish Socialist Workers' Party of Andalusia (PSOE–A)	121,417	20.20	−0.83	3	±0
Forward Andalusia (Adelante Andalucía)	86,227	14.35	+6.34	2	+1
Vox (Vox)	78,307	13.03	−0.21	2	±0
For Andalusia (IU–Podemos–MS–IdPA–VQ–ALTER–AV)	31,827	5.30	−2.20	1	±0
The Party is Over (SALF)	16,836	2.80	New	0	±0
100x100 United (100x100)	14,786	2.46	New	0	±0
Animalist Party with the Environment (PACMA)^{2}	4,048	0.67	−0.53	0	±0
Andalusians–Andalusian People–Linense Andalusians (Andalucistas–PA)^{1}	2,225	0.37	−0.17	0	±0
Blank Seats to Leave Empty Seats (EB)	1,206	0.20	+0.04	0	±0
Communist Party of the Andalusian People (PCPA)	834	0.14	+0.01	0	±0
Self-employed Party (Partido Autónomos)	830	0.14	−0.01	0	±0
For a Fairer World (M+J)	647	0.11	+0.01	0	±0
Andalusian Nation (NA)	639	0.11	±0.00	0	±0
Spanish Phalanx of the CNSO (FE de las JONS)	618	0.10	+0.06	0	±0
Andalusi Party (Andalusí)	538	0.09	New	0	±0
Blank ballots	6,060	1.01	−0.18		
Total	600,974			15	±0
Valid votes	600,974	99.17	+0.09		
Invalid votes	5,043	0.83	−0.09		
Votes cast / turnout	606,017	58.37	+6.83		
Abstentions	432,149	41.63	−6.83		
Registered voters	1,038,166				
Sources
Footnotes: ^{1} Animalist Party with the Environment results are compared to Animalist Party Against Mistreatment of Animals totals in the 2022 election.; ^{2} Andalusians–Andalusian People–Linense Andalusians results are compared to Arise Andalusians Coalition in the 2022 election.

=== 2022 ===
Summary of the 19 June 2022 Parliament of Andalusia election results in Cádiz
Parties and alliances	Popular vote			Seats	
Parties and alliances	Votes	%	±pp	Total	+/−
People's Party (PP)	219,799	42.47	+24.91	8	+5
Spanish Socialist Workers' Party of Andalusia (PSOE–A)	108,840	21.03	–2.74	3	–1
Vox (Vox)	68,548	13.24	+2.01	2	0
Forward Andalusia–Andalusians (Adelante Andalucía–Andalucistas)^{1}	41,438	8.01	n/a	1	–1
United Left–More Country–Greens Equo–Initiative: For Andalusia (PorA)^{1}	38,800	7.50	n/a	1	±0
Citizens–Party of the Citizenry (Cs)	19,823	3.83	–17.07	0	–3
Animalist Party Against Mistreatment of Animals (PACMA)	6,198	1.20	–1.04	0	±0
Arise Andalusians Coalition (AL)^{2}	2,800	0.54	–1.04	0	±0
Blank Seats (EB)	812	0.16	–0.10	0	±0
Self-employed Party (Partido Autónomos)	767	0.15	New	0	±0
Socialist Republican Coalition for Andalusia (CRSxA)^{3}	728	0.14	+0.03	0	±0
Communist Party of the Andalusian People (PCPA)	674	0.13	–0.07	0	±0
Andalusian Nation (NA)	565	0.11	–0.14	0	±0
For a Fairer World (PUM+J)	514	0.10	New	0	±0
Zero Cuts (Recortes Cero)	469	0.09	–0.15	0	±0
Communist Party of the Workers of Spain (PCTE)	418	0.08	New	0	±0
Spanish Phalanx of the CNSO (FE de las JONS)	197	0.04	–0.04	0	±0
Blank ballots	6,185	1.19	–0.60		
Total	517,575			15	±0
Valid votes	517,575	99.08	+0.90		
Invalid votes	4,820	0.92	–0.90		
Votes cast / turnout	522,395	51.54	–0.57		
Abstentions	491,129	48.46	+0.57		
Registered voters	1,013,524				
Sources
Footnotes: ^{1} Within the Forward–We Can–United Left–Spring–Andalusian Left alliance in the 2018 election.; ^{2} Arise Andalusians Coalition results are compared to Andalusia by Herself totals in the 2018 election.; ^{3} Socialist Republican Coalition for Andalusia results are compared to Republican Alternative totals in the 2018 election.

=== 2018 ===
Summary of the 2 December 2018 Parliament of Andalusia election results in Cádiz
Parties and alliances	Popular vote			Seats	
Parties and alliances	Votes	%	±pp	Total	+/−
Spanish Socialist Workers' Party of Andalusia (PSOE–A)	121,321	23.77	–7.86	4	–2
Citizens–Party of the Citizenry (Cs)	106,636	20.90	+10.48	3	+2
Forward–We Can–United Left–Spring–Andalusian Left (Adelante Andalucía)^{1}	97,914	19.19	–6.38	3	–1
People's Party (PP)	89,637	17.56	–6.45	3	–1
Vox (Vox)	57,327	11.23	+10.86	2	+2
Animalist Party Against Mistreatment of Animals (PACMA)	11,451	2.24	+1.14	0	±0
Andalusia by Herself (AxSí)^{2}	8,085	1.58	–1.20	0	±0
Equo Greens–Andalusia Initiative (Equo–Iniciativa)	2,080	0.41	New	0	±0
Blank Seats (EB)	1,319	0.26	New	0	±0
Andalusian Nation (NA)	1,289	0.25	New	0	±0
Zero Cuts–For a Fairer World–Green Group (Recortes Cero–M+J–GV)^{3}	1,209	0.24	+0.07	0	±0
Communist Party of the Andalusian People (PCPA)	1,015	0.20	+0.10	0	±0
Union, Progress and Democracy (UPyD)	944	0.18	–1.92	0	±0
Republican Alternative (ALTER)	560	0.11	New	0	±0
Spanish Phalanx of the CNSO (FE de las JONS)	383	0.08	–0.05	0	±0
Blank ballots	9,151	1.79	+0.17		
Total	510,321			15	±0
Valid votes	510,321	98.18	–1.01		
Invalid votes	9,475	1.82	+1.01		
Votes cast / turnout	519,796	52.11	–5.59		
Abstentions	477,785	47.89	+5.59		
Registered voters	997,581				
Sources
Footnotes: ^{1} Forward–We Can–United Left–Spring–Andalusian Left results are compared to the combined totals of We Can and United Left/The Greens–Assembly for Andalusia in the 2015 election.; ^{2} Andalusia by Herself results are compared to Andalusian Party totals in the 2015 election.; ^{3} Zero Cuts–For a Fairer World–Green Group results are compared to For a Fairer World totals in the 2015 election.

=== 2015 ===
Summary of the 22 March 2015 Parliament of Andalusia election results in Cádiz
Parties and alliances	Popular vote			Seats	
Parties and alliances	Votes	%	±pp	Total	+/−
Spanish Socialist Workers' Party of Andalusia (PSOE–A)	179,843	31.63	–3.95	6	±0
People's Party (PP)	136,491	24.01	–16.46	4	–3
We Can (Podemos)	107,334	18.88	New	3	+3
Citizens–Party of the Citizenry (C's)	59,244	10.42	New	1	+1
United Left/The Greens–Assembly for Andalusia (IULV–CA)	38,018	6.69	–5.99	1	–1
Andalusian Party (PA)	15,833	2.78	–2.12	0	±0
Union, Progress and Democracy (UPyD)	11,944	2.10	–1.21	0	±0
Animalist Party Against Mistreatment of Animals (PACMA)	6,251	1.10	+0.79	0	±0
Vox (Vox)	2,089	0.37	New	0	±0
For a Fairer World (PUM+J)	976	0.17	+0.09	0	±0
Spanish Phalanx of the CNSO (FE de las JONS)	716	0.13	+0.05	0	±0
Communist Party of the Peoples of Spain (PCPE)	585	0.10	–0.01	0	±0
Blank ballots	9,194	1.62	+0.62		
Total	568,518			15	±0
Valid votes	568,518	99.19	–0.34		
Invalid votes	4,620	0.81	+0.34		
Votes cast / turnout	573,138	57.70	+4.48		
Abstentions	420,189	42.30	–4.48		
Registered voters	993,327				

=== 2012 ===
Summary of the 25 March 2012 Parliament of Andalusia election results in Cádiz
Parties and alliances	Popular vote			Seats	
Parties and alliances	Votes	%	±pp	Total	+/−
People's Party (PP)	210,726	40.47	+2.20	7	+1
Spanish Socialist Workers' Party of Andalusia (PSOE–A)	185,265	35.58	–12.25	6	–2
United Left/The Greens–Assembly for Andalusia (IULV–CA)	66,034	12.68	+6.09	2	+1
Andalusian Party (PA)^{1}	25,514	4.90	+0.72	0	±0
Union, Progress and Democracy (UPyD)	17,226	3.31	+2.72	0	±0
Equo (Equo)	2,375	0.46	New	0	±0
Andalusian Platform–Citizen Forum (FC)	1,634	0.31	New	0	±0
Animalist Party Against Mistreatment of Animals (PACMA)	1,599	0.31	New	0	±0
Blank Seats (EB)	971	0.19	New	0	±0
Hartos.org (Hartos.org)	957	0.18	New	0	±0
Communist Party of the Peoples of Spain (PCPE)	571	0.11	New	0	±0
We Won't Pay this Crisis (ECNP)	515	0.10	New	0	±0
For a Fairer World (PUM+J)	435	0.08	New	0	±0
Spanish Phalanx of the CNSO (FE de las JONS)	397	0.08	New	0	±0
Liberal Democratic Centre (CDL)	323	0.06	New	0	±0
Socialists and Republicans (SyR)	273	0.05	New	0	±0
Citizens of Democratic Centre (CCD)	224	0.04	New	0	±0
Republican Social Movement (MSR)	178	0.03	New	0	±0
Andalusian Social Democratic Party (PSDA)	173	0.03	New	0	±0
Communist Unification of Spain (UCE)	141	0.03	New	0	±0
Blank ballots	5,216	1.00	–0.06		
Total	520,747			15	±0
Valid votes	520,747	99.53	+0.15		
Invalid votes	2,440	0.47	–0.15		
Votes cast / turnout	523,187	53.22	–14.09		
Abstentions	459,795	46.78	+14.09		
Registered voters	982,982				
Sources
Footnotes: ^{1} Andalusian Party results are compared to Andalusian Coalition totals in the 2008 election.

=== 2008 ===
Summary of the 9 March 2008 Parliament of Andalusia election results in Cádiz
Parties and alliances	Popular vote			Seats	
Parties and alliances	Votes	%	±pp	Total	+/−
Spanish Socialist Workers' Party of Andalusia (PSOE–A)	307,160	47.83	±0.00	8	±0
People's Party (PP)	245,781	38.27	+6.31	6	+1
United Left/The Greens–Assembly for Andalusia (IULV–CA)	42,320	6.59	–0.01	1	±0
Andalusian Coalition (CA)^{1}	26,838	4.18	–7.00	0	–1
The Greens (LV)	4,456	0.69	New	0	±0
Union, Progress and Democracy (UPyD)	3,757	0.59	New	0	±0
Andalusian Convergence (CAnda)	1,704	0.17	New	0	±0
Republican Left (IR)	935	0.15	+0.01	0	±0
Citizens–Party of the Citizenry (C's)	922	0.14	New	0	±0
Christian Positivist Party (PPCr)	780	0.12	New	0	±0
Humanist Party (PH)	772	0.12	–0.05	0	±0
Blank ballots	6,791	1.06	–0.32		
Total	642,216			15	±0
Valid votes	642,216	99.38	±0.00		
Invalid votes	3,976	0.62	±0.00		
Votes cast / turnout	646,192	67.31	–2.51		
Abstentions	313,817	32.69	+2.51		
Registered voters	960,009				
Sources
Footnotes: ^{1} Andalusian Coalition results are compared to the combined totals of Andalusian Party, Andalusian Forum and Socialist Party of Andalusia in the 2004 election.

=== 2004 ===
Summary of the 14 March 2004 Parliament of Andalusia election results in Cádiz
Parties and alliances	Popular vote			Seats	
Parties and alliances	Votes	%	±pp	Total	+/−
Spanish Socialist Workers' Party of Andalusia (PSOE–A)	307,749	47.83	+8.31	8	+2
People's Party (PP)	205,625	31.96	–5.47	5	–1
Andalusian Party (PA)	46,810	7.27	–7.23	1	–1
United Left/The Greens–Assembly for Andalusia (IULV–CA)	42,459	6.60	+0.27	1	±0
Socialist Party of Andalusia (PSA)	19,925	3.10	New	0	±0
Andalusian Forum (FA)	5,194	0.81	New	0	±0
Party of Precarious Workers (PTPRE)	1,737	0.27	New	0	±0
Humanist Party (PH)	1,088	0.17	+0.03	0	±0
New Andalusian Green Left (NIVA)	1,044	0.16	New	0	±0
Republican Left (IR)	895	0.14	New	0	±0
Andalusia Assembly (A)	800	0.12	–0.07	0	±0
Andalusian Social Democratic Party (PSDA)	707	0.11	New	0	±0
Spanish Phalanx of the CNSO (FE de las JONS)^{1}	555	0.09	+0.01	0	±0
Blank ballots	8,884	1.38	+0.32		
Total	643,472			15	±0
Valid votes	643,472	99.38	+0.06		
Invalid votes	4,032	0.62	–0.06		
Votes cast / turnout	647,504	69.82	+6.82		
Abstentions	279,821	30.18	–6.82		
Registered voters	927,325				
Sources
Footnotes: ^{1} Spanish Phalanx of the CNSO results are compared to Independent Spanish Phalanx totals in the 2000 election.

=== 2000 ===
Summary of the 12 March 2000 Parliament of Andalusia election results in Cádiz
Parties and alliances	Popular vote			Seats	
Parties and alliances	Votes	%	±pp	Total	+/−
Spanish Socialist Workers' Party of Andalusia (PSOE–A)	219,035	39.52	+0.05	6	±0
People's Party (PP)	207,416	37.43	+4.92	6	+1
Andalusian Party (PA)	80,378	14.50	+0.72	2	±0
United Left/The Greens–Assembly for Andalusia (IULV–CA)	35,083	6.33	–6.43	1	–1
Andalusian Left (IA)	2,726	0.49	New	0	±0
Andalusia Assembly (A)	1,034	0.19	New	0	±0
Andalusian Nation (NA)	1,007	0.18	–0.05	0	±0
Humanist Party (PH)	800	0.14	+0.01	0	±0
Independent Spanish Phalanx (FEI)	447	0.08	New	0	±0
The Phalanx (FE)	412	0.07	New	0	±0
Blank ballots	5,870	1.06	+0.34		
Total	554,208			15	±0
Valid votes	554,208	99.32	+0.11		
Invalid votes	3,811	0.68	–0.11		
Votes cast / turnout	558,019	63.00	–10.21		
Abstentions	327,662	37.00	+10.21		
Registered voters	885,681				

=== 1996 ===
Summary of the 3 March 1996 Parliament of Andalusia election results in Cádiz
Parties and alliances	Popular vote			Seats	
Parties and alliances	Votes	%	±pp	Total	+/−
Spanish Socialist Workers' Party of Andalusia (PSOE–A)	242,890	39.47	+4.93	6	+1
People's Party (PP)	200,080	32.51	–0.73	5	±0
Andalusian Party (PA)^{1}	84,799	13.78	+2.14	2	±0
United Left/The Greens–Assembly for Andalusia (IULV–CA)	78,536	12.76	–5.45	2	–1
Andalusian Nation (NA)	1,412	0.23	–0.27	0	±0
Communist Party of the Andalusian People (PCPA)	1,064	0.17	–0.27	0	±0
Humanist Party (PH)	818	0.13	–0.13	0	±0
Democratic Andalusian Unity (UAD)	736	0.12	New	0	±0
Authentic Spanish Phalanx (FEA)	580	0.09	New	0	±0
Blank ballots	4,450	0.72	–0.08		
Total	615,365			15	±0
Valid votes	615,365	99.21	–0.06		
Invalid votes	4,902	0.79	+0.06		
Votes cast / turnout	620,267	73.21	+13.03		
Abstentions	227,015	26.79	–13.03		
Registered voters	847,282				
Sources
Footnotes: ^{1} Andalusian Party results are compared to Andalusian Coalition–Andalusian Power totals in the 1994 election.

=== 1994 ===
Summary of the 12 June 1994 Parliament of Andalusia election results in Cádiz
Parties and alliances	Popular vote			Seats	
Parties and alliances	Votes	%	±pp	Total	+/−
Spanish Socialist Workers' Party of Andalusia (PSOE–A)	168,160	34.54	–12.06	5	–3
People's Party (PP)	161,847	33.24	+17.70	5	+3
United Left/The Greens–Assembly for Andalusia (IULV–CA)	88,647	18.21	+8.16	3	+2
Andalusian Coalition–Andalusian Power (PA–PAP)^{1}	56,652	11.64	–9.94	2	–2
Andalusian Nation (NA)^{2}	2,441	0.50	+0.41	0	±0
Communist Party of the Andalusian People (PCPA)	2,122	0.44	+0.24	0	±0
Forum–Democratic and Social Centre (Foro–CDS)	1,876	0.39	–0.45	0	±0
Humanist Party (PH)	1,285	0.26	+0.15	0	±0
Blank ballots	3,872	0.80	+0.35		
Total	486,902			15	±0
Valid votes	486,902	99.27	+0.06		
Invalid votes	3,586	0.73	–0.06		
Votes cast / turnout	490,488	60.18	+12.31		
Abstentions	324,586	39.82	–12.31		
Registered voters	815,074				
Sources
Footnotes: ^{1} Andalusian Coalition–Andalusian Power results are compared to Andalusian Party totals in the 1990 election.; ^{2} Andalusian Nation results are compared to Andalusian Front of Liberation totals in the 1990 election.

=== 1990 ===
Summary of the 23 June 1990 Parliament of Andalusia election results in Cádiz
Parties and alliances	Popular vote			Seats	
Parties and alliances	Votes	%	±pp	Total	+/−
Spanish Socialist Workers' Party of Andalusia (PSOE–A)	167,994	46.60	–5.21	8	–1
Andalusian Party (PA)	77,792	21.58	+11.30	4	+3
People's Party (PP)^{1}	56,021	15.54	–3.61	2	–1
United Left–Assembly for Andalusia (IU–CA)	36,224	10.05	–1.31	1	–1
Ruiz-Mateos Group (ARM)	8,305	2.30	New	0	±0
Democratic and Social Centre (CDS)	3,019	0.84	–2.77	0	±0
Socialist Democracy (DS)	2,366	0.66	New	0	±0
Greens of Andalusia (VA)	2,100	0.58	New	0	±0
The Ecologist Greens (LVE)	1,882	0.52	New	0	±0
Workers' Party of Spain–Communist Unity (PTE–UC)^{2}	1,245	0.35	–0.90	0	±0
Communist Party of the Andalusian People (PCPA)	738	0.20	New	0	±0
Spanish Phalanx of the CNSO (FE–JONS)	477	0.13	New	0	±0
Humanist Party (PH)	399	0.11	–0.22	0	±0
Andalusian Front of Liberation (FAL)	308	0.09	New	0	±0
Blank ballots	1,619	0.45	–0.02		
Total	360,489			15	±0
Valid votes	360,489	99.21	+1.42		
Invalid votes	2,854	0.79	–1.42		
Votes cast / turnout	363,343	47.87	–18.54		
Abstentions	395,660	52.13	+18.54		
Registered voters	759,003				
Sources
Footnotes: ^{1} People's Party results are compared to People's Coalition totals in the 1986 election.; ^{2} Workers' Party of Spain–Communist Unity results are compared to Communists' Unity Board totals in the 1986 election.

=== 1986 ===
Summary of the 22 June 1986 Parliament of Andalusia election results in Cádiz
Parties and alliances	Popular vote			Seats	
Parties and alliances	Votes	%	±pp	Total	+/−
Spanish Socialist Workers' Party of Andalusia (PSOE–A)	243,187	51.81	–2.71	9	±0
People's Coalition (AP–PDP–PL)^{1}	89,865	19.15	+3.90	3	+1
United Left–Assembly for Andalusia (IU–CA)^{2}	53,339	11.36	+5.34	2	+1
Andalusian Party (PA)	48,242	10.28	+1.12	1	±0
Democratic and Social Centre (CDS)	16,944	3.61	New	0	±0
Communists' Unity Board (MUC)	5,845	1.25	New	0	±0
Socialist Party of the Andalusian People (PSPA)	4,117	0.88	New	0	±0
Democratic Reformist Party (PRD)	2,760	0.59	New	0	±0
Humanist Party (PH)	1,560	0.33	New	0	±0
Andalusian Liberation (LA)	1,278	0.27	New	0	±0
Union of the Democratic Centre (UCD)	n/a	n/a	–11.36	0	–2
Blank ballots	2,209	0.47	+0.07		
Total	469,346			15	±0
Valid votes	469,346	97.79	–1.18		
Invalid votes	10,629	2.21	+1.18		
Votes cast / turnout	479,975	66.41	+5.54		
Abstentions	242,771	33.59	–5.54		
Registered voters	722,746				
Sources
Footnotes: ^{1} People's Coalition results are compared to People's Alliance–People's Democratic Party totals in the 1982 election.; ^{2} United Left–Assembly for Andalusia results are compared to Communist Party of Andalusia totals in the 1982 election.

=== 1982 ===
Summary of the 23 May 1982 Parliament of Andalusia election results in Cádiz
Parties and alliances	Popular vote			Seats	
Parties and alliances	Votes	%	±pp	Total	+/−
Spanish Socialist Workers' Party of Andalusia (PSOE–A)	210,693	54.52	n/a	9	n/a
People's Alliance (AP)	58,932	15.25	n/a	2	n/a
Union of the Democratic Centre (UCD)	43,918	11.36	n/a	2	n/a
Socialist Party of Andalusia–Andalusian Party (PSA–PA)	35,407	9.16	n/a	1	n/a
Communist Party of Andalusia (PCA–PCE)	23,269	6.02	n/a	1	n/a
Workers' Socialist Party (PST)	5,781	1.50	n/a	0	n/a
New Force (FN)	2,622	0.68	n/a	0	n/a
Communist Unification of Spain (UCE)	1,355	0.35	n/a	0	n/a
Communist Party of Spain (Marxist–Leninist) (PCE (m–l))	1,187	0.31	n/a	0	n/a
Communist Movement of Andalusia (MCA)	1,154	0.30	n/a	0	n/a
Falangist Movement of Spain (MFE)	613	0.16	n/a	0	n/a
Blank ballots	1,554	0.40	n/a		
Total	386,485			15	n/a
Valid votes	386,485	98.97	n/a		
Invalid votes	4,007	1.03	n/a		
Votes cast / turnout	390,492	60.87	n/a		
Abstentions	251,007	39.13	n/a		
Registered voters	641,499				

== Bibliography ==
- Real Decreto-ley 20/1977, de 18 de marzo, sobre Normas Electorales (Royal Decree-Law 20/1977). Official State Gazette (in Spanish). 18 March 1977. BOE-A-1977-7445.
- Ley Orgánica 6/1981, de 30 de diciembre, de Estatuto de Autonomía para Andalucía (Organic Law 6/1981). Official State Gazette (in Spanish). 30 December 1981. BOE-A-1982-633.
- Decreto 18/1982, de ocho de Marzo, por el que se convocan Elecciones al Parlamento de Andalucía (PDF) (Decree 18/1982). Official Gazette of the Regional Government of Andalusia (in Spanish). 8 March 1982.
- Ley Orgánica 5/1985, de 19 de junio, del Régimen Electoral General (Organic Law 5/1985). Official State Gazette (in Spanish). 19 June 1985. BOE-A-1985-11672.
- Ley 1/1986, de 2 de enero, Electoral de Andalucía (Law 1/1986). Official State Gazette (in Spanish). 2 January 1986. BOE-A-1986-2788.
- Ley Orgánica 2/2007, de 19 de marzo, de reforma del Estatuto de Autonomía para Andalucía (Organic Law 2/2007). Official State Gazette (in Spanish). 19 March 2007. BOE-A-2007-5825.
