= 2012 Andalusian regional election =

Election in the Spanish region of Andalusia

- 25 March 2012

All 109 seats in the Parliament of Andalusia 55 seats needed for a majority
- Opinion polls
- Registered: 6,392,620 ▲2.6%
- Turnout: 3,885,137 (60.8%) ▼11.9 pp
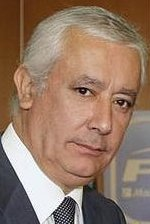

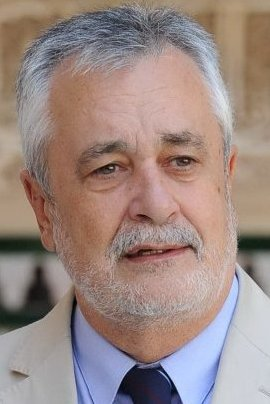

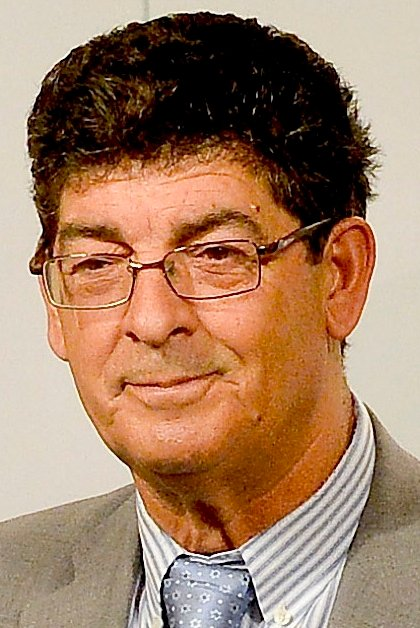
	First party	Second party	Third party
Leader	Javier Arenas	José Antonio Griñán	Diego Valderas
Party	PP	PSOE–A	IULV–CA
Leader since	18 April 2004	23 April 2009	15 October 2000
Leader's seat	Almería	Seville	Huelva
Last election	47 seats, 38.5%	56 seats, 48.4%	6 seats, 7.1%
Seats won	50	47	12
Seat change	▲3	▼9	▲6
Popular vote	1,570,833	1,527,923	438,372
Percentage	40.7%	39.6%	11.3%
Swing	▲2.2 pp	▼8.8 pp	▲4.2 pp
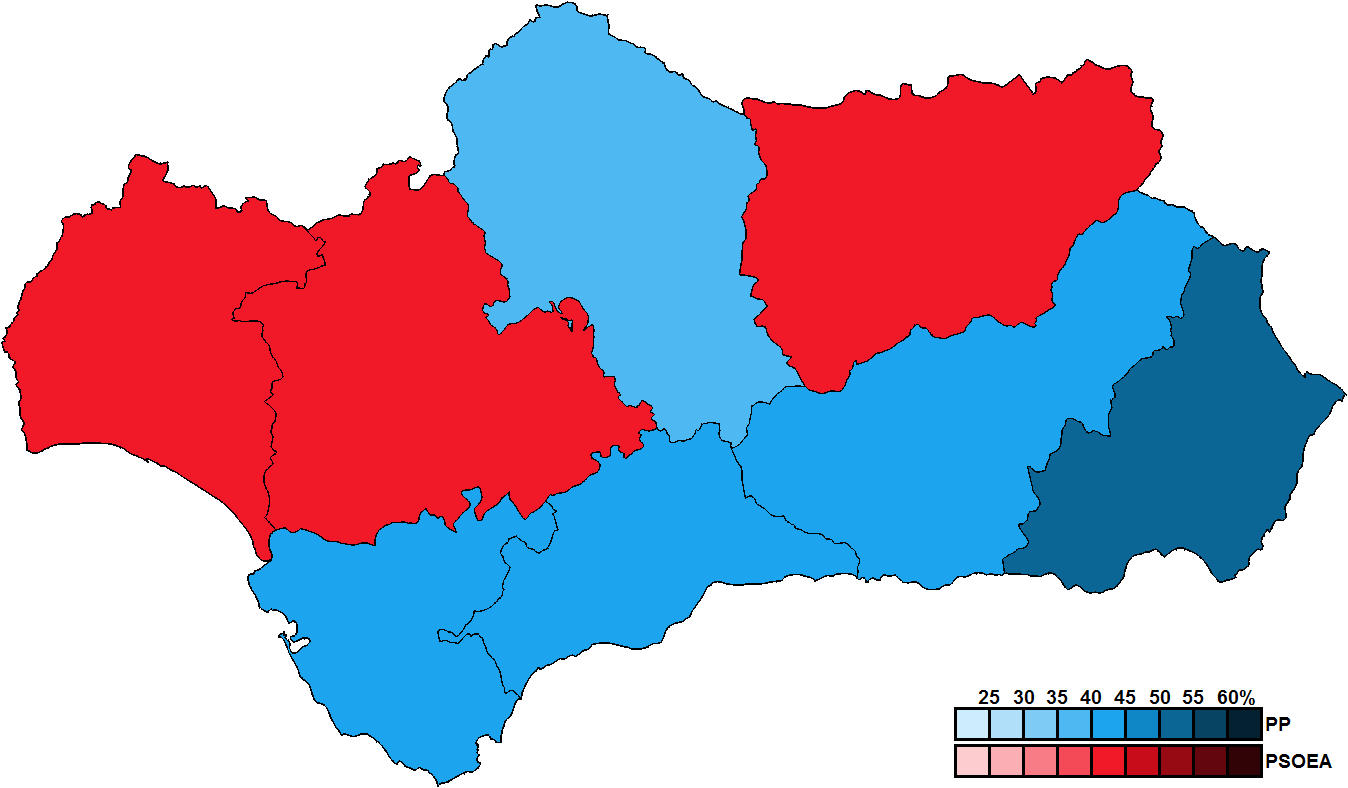
- Constituency results map for the Parliament of Andalusia
President before election
José Antonio Griñán
PSOE
President after election
José Antonio Griñán
PSOE

A regional election was held in Andalusia on 25 March 2012 to elect the 9th Parliament of the autonomous community. All 109 seats in the Parliament were up for election. It was held concurrently with a regional election in Asturias.

Being a Spanish Socialist Workers' Party (PSOE–A) stronghold for decades, the People's Party (PP) had scored a decisive win in the region in the November 2011 general election and was widely expected to come out on top in the regional election for the first time in its history, with opinion polls suggesting it could win an absolute majority on its own. The election, however, came to be seen as the first major electoral test for the national government of Mariano Rajoy since coming to power in December 2011, with Rajoy's policies of raising taxes and the passing of a new, harsher labour reform having triggered a general strike for 29 March. Incumbent President José Antonio Griñán chose not to hold the election simultaneously with the 2011 general election, the first time since 1994 that both elections were not held at the same time.

Final results showed a surprising close race between the PP and the PSOE–A, the first emerging out on top but falling five seats short of an overall majority. In contrast, the PSOE–A held its own and retained 47 seats despite polls predicting a tougher defeat, allowing Griñán to remain in power through a coalition government with United Left (IULV–CA), which doubled its seat count from 6 to 12 and was placed in a "kingmaker" position.

== Background ==
The 2008 election had seen Manuel Chaves secure a sixth term in office as president of the Regional Government of Andalusia, having governed the autonomous community uninterruptedly during the previous 18 years. However, Chaves's long tenure had already started taking a toll on his popularity in opinion polls, and in April 2009 he vacated the regional presidency in order to become third deputy prime minister in the second government of José Luis Rodríguez Zapatero. José Antonio Griñán, second vice president of the Andalusian government since 2008 and regional minister for Economy and Finance since 2004, succeeded Chaves at the helm of the regional government.

During Griñán's term, his party had to deal with the worsening economic situation resulting from the financial crisis affecting Spain since 2008, with rising unemployment reaching record heights and traditional savings banks being dismantled for being economically unsustainable. The PSOE–A also had to cope with the political fallout resulting from the ERE scandal, a corruption scheme involving the ruling party, as well as the Workers' Commissions (CCOO) and General Union of Workers (UGT) trade unions, which saw irregular payments to politicians, civil servants and companies aligned to the PSOE in exchange for loyalties and favours meant to sustain the party in power. Those payments were charged to an economic fund intended to support companies with problems—more specifically, those that were forced to undergo "Employment Regulation Procedures" (in Spanish, Expedientes de Regulación de Empleo or ERE, terminology that gave the scandal its name)—. The scandal first came under investigation in January 2011, and by the time of the 2012 regional election judicial inquiries reached out to government officers and renown figures.

The opposition People's Party (PP) of Mariano Rajoy won a resounding victory in the 2011 general election in Andalusia, winning in both seats and popular vote for the first time ever in this autonomous community since the Spanish transition to democracy: the PP obtained 1,985,612 votes (45.57%) and 33 seats to Spanish Socialist Workers' Party (PSOE–A)'s 1,594,893 votes (36.60%) and 25 seats, after losing 800,000 votes and 11 seats from those won in the 2008 general election. United Left (IULV–CA) won 2 seats from Seville and Málaga and 8.27% of the share with 360,212 votes. Results projections based on the results of the general election gave the PP an absolute majority with 58 seats—out of 109 up for election—, with the PSOE in a distant second place with 43 seats. IULV–CA would keep its 6 seats on the projections while Union, Progress and Democracy (UPyD) could enter the Parliament of Andalusia with 2 seats. Had those results been confirmed, it would have meant the end of a 30 year-long hegemony of Socialist rule in the community, the party having been in power since the creation of the Andalusian autonomous community.

The regularly scheduled 2012 election in Andalusia, which was unexpectedly joined by a snap election in Asturias, came to be seen as the first major electoral test for the national government of Mariano Rajoy since coming to power in December 2011. Rajoy's policies of raising taxes and the passing of a new, harsher labour reform had triggered a general strike scheduled for 29 March.

== Overview ==
Under the 2007 Statute of Autonomy, the Parliament of Andalusia was the unicameral legislature of the homonymous autonomous community, having legislative power in devolved matters, as well as the ability to grant or withdraw confidence from a regional president. The electoral and procedural rules were supplemented by national law provisions.

=== Date ===
The term of the Parliament of Andalusia expired four years after the date of its previous election, unless it was dissolved earlier. The election decree was required to be issued no later than 25 days before the scheduled expiration date of parliament and published on the following day in the Official Gazette of the Regional Government of Andalusia (BOJA), with election day taking place 54 days after the decree's publication (barring any date within from 1 July to 31 August). The previous election was held on 9 March 2008, which meant that the chamber's term would have expired on 9 March 2012. The election decree was required to be published in the BOJA no later than 14 February 2012, setting the latest possible date for election day on 8 April 2012.

The regional president had the prerogative to dissolve the Parliament of Andalusia at any given time and call a snap election, provided that no motion of no confidence was in process and that dissolution did not occur before one year after a previous one. In the event of an investiture process failing to elect a regional president within a two-month period from the first ballot, the Parliament was to be automatically dissolved and a fresh election called.

Several dates were considered for the election. Initially scheduled for either 4 or 18 March, the result of the general election on 20 November 2011 made it advisable for Griñán to push the date further away to the last Sunday of March, in order to push the legislature to the limit and distance himself from the November election result. This marked the first time since 1994 that an Andalusian regional election was not held concurrently with a Spanish general election, as then-Prime Minister José Luis Rodríguez Zapatero had announced a general election—initially scheduled for March 2012—four months ahead of schedule, on 20 November 2011, whereas Griñán chose not to follow suit and to maintain the date of the regional election for early 2012.

The Parliament of Andalusia was officially dissolved on 31 January 2012 with the publication of the corresponding decree in the BOJA, setting election day for 25 March and scheduling for the chamber to reconvene on 19 April.

=== Electoral system ===
Voting for the Parliament was based on universal suffrage, comprising all Spanish nationals over 18 years of age, registered in Andalusia and with full political rights, provided that they had not been deprived of the right to vote by a final sentence, nor were legally incapacitated. Amendments in 2011 required non-resident citizens to apply for voting, a system known as "begged" voting (Spanish: Voto rogado).

The Parliament of Andalusia had a minimum of 109 seats, with electoral provisions fixing its size at that number. All were elected in eight multi-member constituencies—corresponding to the provinces of Almería, Cádiz, Córdoba, Granada, Huelva, Jaén, Málaga and Seville, each of which was assigned an initial minimum of eight seats and the remaining 45 distributed in proportion to population (with the number of seats in each province not exceeding two times that of any other)—using the D'Hondt method and closed-list proportional voting, with a three percent-threshold of valid votes (including blank ballots) in each constituency. The use of this electoral method resulted in a higher effective threshold depending on district magnitude and vote distribution.

As a result of the aforementioned allocation, each Parliament constituency was entitled the following seats:

Seats	Constituencies
18	Seville
17	Málaga^{(+1)}
15	Cádiz
13	Granada
12	Almería, Córdoba
11	Huelva, Jaén^{(−1)}

The law did not provide for by-elections to fill vacant seats; instead, any vacancies arising after the proclamation of candidates and during the legislative term were filled by the next candidates on the party lists or, when required, by designated substitutes.

=== Outgoing parliament ===
The table below shows the composition of the parliamentary groups in the chamber at the time of dissolution.

Parliamentary composition in January 2012
Groups	Parties	Legislators	
Groups	Parties	Seats	Total
Socialist Parliamentary Group	PSOE–A	56	56
Andalusian People's Parliamentary Group	PP	47	47
United Left/The Greens Parliamentary Group	IULV–CA	6	6

== Parties and candidates ==
The electoral law allowed for parties and federations registered in the interior ministry, alliances and groupings of electors to present lists of candidates. Parties and federations intending to form an alliance were required to inform the relevant electoral commission within 10 days of the election call, whereas groupings of electors needed to secure the signature of at least one percent of the electorate in the constituencies for which they sought election, disallowing electors from signing for more than one list. Additionally, a balanced composition of men and women was required in the electoral lists through the use of a zipper system.

Below is a list of the main parties and alliances which contested the election:

Candidacy	Parties and alliances	Leading candidate	Ideology	Previous result		Gov.	Ref.
Candidacy	Parties and alliances	Leading candidate	Ideology	Vote %	Seats	Gov.	Ref.
PSOE–A	List: Spanish Socialist Workers' Party of Andalusia (PSOE–A)	José Antonio Griñán	Social democracy	48.4%	56	Yes	
PP	List: People's Party (PP)	Javier Arenas	Conservatism; Christian democracy	38.5%	47	No	
IULV–CA	List: United Left/The Greens–Assembly for Andalusia (IULV–CA) – Communist Party of Andalusia (PCA) – Collective for the Unity of Workers–Andalusian Left Bloc (CUT–BAI) – Revolutionary Workers' Party (POR) – Republican Left (IR) – Open Left (IzAb)	Diego Valderas	Socialism; Communism	7.1%	6	No	
PA	List: Andalusian Party (PA)	Pilar González	Andalusian nationalism Social democracy	2.8% (Note: Results for CA in the 2008 election.)	0	No	
UPyD	List: Union, Progress and Democracy (UPyD)	Martín de la Herrán	Social liberalism Radical centrism	0.6%	0	No	

== Campaign ==
=== Party slogans ===
Party or alliance	Original slogan	English translation	Ref.
PSOE–A	« Andalucía, por el camino seguro »	"Andalusia, through the safe way"	
PP	« El cambio andaluz »	"The Andalusian change"	
IULV–CA	« Rebélate! »	"Rebel!"	
PA	« PAlante »	"Forward"	
UPyD	« Lo que nos une »	"What unites us"	

=== Debates ===
2012 Andalusian regional election debates
Date	Organizer(s)	Moderator(s)	P Present (Note: Denotes a main invitee attending the event.) S Surrogate (Note: Denotes a main invitee not attending the event, sending a surrogate in their place.) NI Not invited I Invited A Absent invitee				
Date	Organizer(s)	Moderator(s)	PSOE–A	PP	IULV–CA	Audience	Ref.
12 March	RTVA	Mabel Mata	P Griñán	A	P Valderas	10.1% (358,000)	

== Opinion polls ==
The tables below list opinion polling results in reverse chronological order, showing the most recent first and using the dates when the survey fieldwork was done, as opposed to the date of publication. Where the fieldwork dates are unknown, the date of publication is given instead. The highest percentage figure in each polling survey is displayed with its background shaded in the leading party's colour. If a tie ensues, this is applied to the figures with the highest percentages. The "Lead" column on the right shows the percentage-point difference between the parties with the highest percentages in a poll.

=== Graphical summary ===
Local regression trend line of poll results from 9 March 2008 to 25 March 2012, with each line corresponding to a political party.

=== Voting intention estimates ===
The table below lists weighted voting intention estimates. Refusals are generally excluded from the party vote percentages, while question wording and the treatment of "don't know" responses and those not intending to vote may vary between polling organisations. When available, seat projections determined by the polling organisations are displayed below (or in place of) the percentages in a smaller font; 55 seats were required for an absolute majority in the Parliament of Andalusia.

Color key:

Exit poll

Polling firm/Commissioner	Fieldwork date	Sample size	Turnout	PSOE–A	PP	IULV	PA	UPyD	Lead
2012 regional election	25 Mar 2012	—N/a	60.8	39.6; 47	40.7; 50	11.3; 12	2.5; 0	3.4; 0	1.1
Ipsos/RTVA	25 Mar 2012	?	60.4	39.2; 45/48	42.0; 52/55	9.9; 8/10	2.7; 0	3.0; 0	2.8
GAD3	19 Mar 2012	?	?	38.1; 44/48	46.7; 55/58	8.1; 7/9	2.1; 0	2.7; 0	8.6
UJA	12–16 Mar 2012	1,500	?	36.8; 43/45	42.9; 53/56	10.8; 9/10	2.7; 0/1	3.6; 0/1	6.1
Sigma Dos/El Mundo	12–15 Mar 2012	2,000	?	36.0; 43/44	45.8; 54/57	8.9; 7/9	2.9; 0/1	3.8; 1/2	9.8
Metroscopia/El País	6–15 Mar 2012	1,200	?	34.4; 41	47.3; 59	8.8; 9	2.7; 0	3.2; 0	12.9
NC Report/La Razón	1–15 Mar 2012	2,700	67.6	36.1; 42/44	46.0; 55/57	9.3; 7/9	? 0/1	4.2; 0/2	9.9
Opinión 2000/Cadena SER	12–13 Mar 2012	800	?	36.0	46.7	8.8	4.1	2.8	10.7
IMC/ABC	7–12 Mar 2012	1,000	?	35.6; 43	47.0; 58	8.7; 6	1.8; 0	4.6; 2	11.4
Low Cost/La Gaceta	5–12 Mar 2012	1,500	?	37.2; 44	45.2; 57	8.5; 7	–	? 1	8.0
GAD3	5–8 Mar 2012	750	63	36.8; 42/45	46.2; 56/58	9.2; 7/10	2.4; 0	2.9; 0/1	9.4
NC Report/La Razón	20 Feb–6 Mar 2012	2,700	67.7	35.7; 41/44	45.7; 55/57	9.9; 8/9	? 0/1	4.3; 0/2	10.0
Commentia/Grupo Joly	13–29 Feb 2012	1,001	?	36.9; 44/47	45.2; 54/57	8.5; 7/8	2.3; 0	3.7; 0/1	8.3
CIS	15–27 Feb 2012	3,139	?	37.7; 44/46	44.9; 54/55	9.8; 9/10	2.6; 0	2.6; 0	7.2
Sigma Dos/El Mundo	22–24 Feb 2012	2,000	?	36.3; 42/44	45.0; 54/57	9.3; 8/9	2.4; 0/1	4.2; 1/2	8.7
GESPA/PP	6–22 Feb 2012	2,000	?	37.2; 43/44	46.7; 56/58	7.6; 6/7	2.2; 0	3.9; 2	9.5
IMC/ABC	8–16 Feb 2012	1,500	?	36.2; 43/44	46.3; 56/60	8.2; 5/7	2.2; 0	4.3; 1/2	10.1
Nexo/CEPES–A	1–14 Feb 2012	1,600	71.5	37.6; 46/47	45.1; 53/57	7.5; 6/8	2.8; 0/1	3.3; 0/1	7.5
NC Report/La Razón	1–13 Feb 2012	?	67.6	34.2; 41	47.4; 57	? 9	? 1	? 1	13.2
NC Report/La Razón	30 Jan 2012	?	67.3	35.6; 44	46.9; 55	8.9; 8	2.9; 1	3.8; 1	11.3
IMC/ABC	16–24 Jan 2012	1,500	?	35.2	47.1	8.5	2.1	4.7	11.9
Low Cost/Libertad Digital	22 Jan 2012	2,400	?	36.6; 44	43.7; 56	9.1; 8	–	4.6; 1	7.1
CADPEA/UGR	1–30 Dec 2011	3,200	63.4	37.6; 45/47	47.0; 56/58	6.3; 5/6	2.0; 0	3.0; 0/1	9.4
2011 general election	20 Nov 2011	—N/a	68.9	36.6 (44)	45.6 (58)	8.3 (5)	1.8 (0)	4.8 (2)	9.0
Commentia/Grupo Joly	18–24 Oct 2011	501	?	34.8	49.4	8.4	2.0	–	14.6
IESA/CSIC	26 Sep–21 Oct 2011	3,682	69.8	36.0	46.4	8.1	2.8	3.2	10.4
ABC	29 Jul 2011	?	68.2	33.2	50.2	8.3	2.3	1.5	17.0
Sigma Dos/PP	14–19 Jul 2011	800	?	34.2	50.4	7.7	2.8	–	16.2
CADPEA/UGR	6 Jun–11 Jul 2011	3,600	69.9	34.3	48.9	8.3	2.4	1.4	14.6
IMOP/PSOE	4–10 Jul 2011	1,514	?	39.0	46.0	6.8	2.5	3.0	7.0
Sigma Dos/El Mundo	12–15 Apr 2011	1,200	?	36.8; 43/46	48.0; 56/60	7.8; 6/7	–	–	11.2
Metroscopia/El País	21–22 Feb 2011	804	?	35.2; 45	47.5; 57	8.4; 7	–	–	12.3
IMC/ABC	10–20 Feb 2011	1,600	?	38.2; 45	45.3; 57	7.6; 7	2.3; 0	–	7.1
Sigma Dos/Vocento	15–18 Feb 2011	800	?	38.2	47.6	7.7	1.3	1.8	9.4
Commentia/Grupo Joly	9–16 Feb 2011	500	?	36.9	47.1	8.5	2.9	–	10.2
GESPA/PP	1–4 Feb 2011	1,111	?	37.0; 45	46.1; 56/57	7.8; 7/8	–	–	9.1
Nexo/CEPES–A	18 Jan–2 Feb 2011	1,200	73.0	39.7	46.2	7.6	3.2	–	6.5
NC Report/La Razón	30 Dec–3 Jan 2011	?	?	39.1; 46/47	46.2; 53/54	? 9	–	–	7.1
Sigma Dos/El Mundo	20–23 Dec 2010	1,200	?	36.4; 41/46	49.3; 56/64	7.2; 4/7	–	–	12.9
CADPEA/UGR	24 Nov–22 Dec 2010	3,200	75.2	36.2	45.4	8.2	2.3	1.4	9.2
IESA/CSIC	18 Oct–18 Nov 2010	3,655	71.0	37.7; 43	46.8; 58	8.2; 8	2.9; 0	1.7; 0	9.1
Commentia/Grupo Joly	21–27 Oct 2010	502	?	39.1	46.2	7.0	2.7	2.1	7.1
GESPA/PP	20–26 Sep 2010	1,111	?	38.2; 45/46	45.5; 56/57	7.6; 7	2.5; 0	1.7; 0	7.3
CADPEA/UGR	7 Jun–6 Jul 2010	3,200	72.1	38.0	45.1	8.1	2.1	1.5	7.1
Commentia/Grupo Joly	10–15 Jun 2010	806	?	38.1	45.4	8.5	2.5	1.5	7.3
IMC/ABC	8–12 Jun 2010	817	?	38.7; 46	44.3; 56	7.6; 7	2.3; 0	–	5.6
Metroscopia/El País	15–18 Feb 2010	804	?	41.0; 49	43.3; 54	7.2; 6	2.9; 0	–	2.3
Commentia/Grupo Joly	9–15 Feb 2010	801	?	42.9	42.5	7.5	2.5	2.0	0.4
Sigma Dos/Vocento	8–15 Feb 2010	800	?	41.8	45.7	6.2	1.4	1.6	3.9
IMC/ABC	25 Jan–12 Feb 2010	1,600	?	40.8; 51	42.9; 52	7.2; 6	2.1; 0	–	2.1
CADPEA/UGR	7–29 Jan 2010	3,200	76.7	43.2	41.9	7.1	2.8	1.4	1.3
PULSO/El Correo	11–28 Jan 2010	1,800	?	41.8	41.1	6.4	2.4	2.6	0.7
Nexo/CEPES–A	20–28 Jan 2010	1,207	71.0	41.3	41.9	6.9	3.9	–	0.6
IESA/CSIC	1–30 Nov 2009	3,645	70.5	41.6	43.2	7.1	2.4	1.8	1.6
Commentia/Grupo Joly	23 Sep–2 Oct 2009	1,002	75	42.7	42.2	7.1	2.4	2.6	0.5
CADPEA/UGR	9 Jun–9 Jul 2009	3,200	74.9	46.2	39.7	6.7	2.6	1.1	6.5
Commentia/Grupo Joly	28 Jun 2009	1,003	75	45.6	39.1	7.5	2.7	2.4	6.5
GESPA/PP	16–24 Jun 2009	2,500	?	44.1	42.8	6.5	1.5	2.1	1.3
Grupo ESTIO/El Correo	25 May–19 Jun 2009	1,400	?	48.6	40.2	6.2	1.8	–	8.4
2009 EP election	7 Jun 2009	—N/a	41.7	48.2 (58)	39.7 (48)	5.2 (3)	1.0 (0)	2.5 (0)	8.5
Sigma Dos/Vocento	19–23 Feb 2009	800	?	46.8	40.5	7.2	1.9	–	6.3
Metroscopia/El País	10–12 Feb 2009	800	73.3	44.3; 53/55	43.2; 49/50	6.6; 5/6	2.9; 0	–	1.1
Commentia/Grupo Joly	29 Jan–11 Feb 2009	1,000	?	46.2	39.1	7.5	2.8	1.2	7.1
IMC/ABC	5–9 Feb 2009	1,600	?	45.8; 54	42.6; 49	6.9; 6	1.9; 0	–	3.2
Nexo/CEPES–A	20–30 Jan 2009	1,202	70.5	45.8	39.6	7.9	3.1	–	6.2
Idea Asesores/PP	9–19 Dec 2008	2,000	?	44.7; 52	43.1; 51	7.6; 6	1.5; 0	–	1.6
CADPEA/UGR	14 Nov–12 Dec 2008	3,200	74.7	46.2	38.8	7.5	2.2	–	7.4
IESA/CSIC	10 Nov–5 Dec 2008	3,658	71.8	47.0	40.8	6.2	2.5	–	6.2
Commentia/Grupo Joly	20 Sep–2 Oct 2008	1,007	?	46.5	39.6	7.3	2.2	1.2	6.9
CADPEA/UGR	2 Jun–4 Jul 2008	3,200	74.0	46.7	38.1	7.9	2.0	–	8.6
2008 regional election	9 Mar 2008	—N/a	72.7	48.4; 56	38.5; 47	7.1; 6	2.8; 0	0.6; 0	9.9

=== Voting preferences ===
The table below lists raw, unweighted voting preferences.

Polling firm/Commissioner	Fieldwork date	Sample size	PSOE–A	PP	IULV	PA	UPyD	Question	X mark	Lead
2012 regional election (Note: Does not include non-resident citizens.)	25 Mar 2012	—N/a	24.5	25.2	7.0	1.6	2.1	—N/a	37.8	0.7
CIS	15–27 Feb 2012	3,139	29.6	25.3	7.9	1.6	1.7	19.9	9.6	4.3
CADPEA/UGR	1–30 Dec 2011	3,200	21.4	31.3	6.6	1.6	2.0	22.6	8.8	9.9
2011 general election	20 Nov 2011	—N/a	25.6	31.9	5.8	1.2	3.3	—N/a	29.3	6.3
Commentia/Grupo Joly	18–24 Oct 2011	501	21.9	34.0	–	–	–	–	–	12.1
IESA/CSIC	26 Sep–21 Oct 2011	3,682	23.4	32.4	5.8	1.9	2.2	23.3	6.1	9.0
CADPEA/UGR	6 Jun–11 Jul 2011	3,600	18.5	32.0	5.9	1.8	1.6	27.8	8.3	13.5
IMC/ABC	10–20 Feb 2011	1,600	28.9	32.5	4.6	1.8	–	25.9	–	3.6
Commentia/Grupo Joly	9–16 Feb 2011	500	21.3	29.8	–	–	–	–	–	8.5
CADPEA/UGR	24 Nov–22 Dec 2010	3,200	20.8	27.0	5.0	1.5	1.3	24.2	12.6	6.2
IESA/CSIC	18 Oct–18 Nov 2010	3,655	22.5	30.8	5.4	2.0	1.3	27.8	6.8	8.3
Commentia/Grupo Joly	21–27 Oct 2010	502	23.4	30.4	–	–	–	–	–	7.0
CADPEA/UGR	7 Jun–6 Jul 2010	3,200	22.5	25.4	5.7	1.6	1.4	21.7	13.6	2.9
Commentia/Grupo Joly	10–15 Jun 2010	806	23.0	31.1	–	–	–	–	–	8.1
Commentia/Grupo Joly	9–15 Feb 2010	801	27.8	27.5	–	–	–	–	–	0.3
IMC/ABC	25 Jan–12 Feb 2010	1,600	31.7	32.4	3.5	1.9	–	25.4	–	0.7
CADPEA/UGR	7–29 Jan 2010	3,200	24.7	24.0	5.1	2.2	1.9	21.6	14.0	0.7
Nexo/CEPES–A	20–28 Jan 2010	1,207	22.2	26.3	4.2	2.8	1.8	23.4	10.0	4.1
IESA/CSIC	1–30 Nov 2009	3,645	28.7	28.7	5.3	2.2	0.6	21.8	8.1	Tie
Commentia/Grupo Joly	23 Sep–2 Oct 2009	1,002	26.3	28.1	–	–	–	–	–	1.8
CADPEA/UGR	9 Jun–9 Jul 2009	3,200	26.9	22.6	5.1	1.3	2.4	24.1	13.1	4.3
Commentia/Grupo Joly	28 Jun 2009	1,003	29.9	26.5	–	–	–	–	–	3.4
2009 EP election	7 Jun 2009	—N/a	20.3	16.8	2.2	0.4	1.1	—N/a	57.6	3.5
Commentia/Grupo Joly	29 Jan–11 Feb 2009	1,000	29.9	25.4	–	–	–	–	–	4.5
CADPEA/UGR	14 Nov–12 Dec 2008	3,200	31.9	21.0	4.5	1.4	1.0	23.5	11.6	10.9
IESA/CSIC	10 Nov–5 Dec 2008	3,658	32.0	27.0	4.8	2.2	–	22.8	6.9	5.0
Commentia/Grupo Joly	20 Sep–2 Oct 2008	1,007	27.7	24.9	–	–	–	–	–	2.8
CADPEA/UGR	2 Jun–4 Jul 2008	3,200	28.2	23.6	5.6	2.4	0.9	21.3	11.1	4.6
2008 regional election	9 Mar 2008	—N/a	35.3	28.3	5.2	2.0	0.4	—N/a	26.4	7.0

=== Victory preferences ===
The table below lists opinion polling on the victory preferences for each party in the event of a regional election taking place.

Polling firm/Commissioner	Fieldwork date	Sample size	PSOE–A	PP	IULV	PA	UPyD	Other/ None	Question	Lead
Opinión 2000/Cadena SER	12–13 Mar 2012	800	30.9	38.4	6.5	2.0	2.8	7.5	12.1	7.5
CIS	15–27 Feb 2012	3,139	33.6	28.3	9.1	2.1	2.1	2.0	22.8	5.3
IESA/CSIC	26 Sep–21 Oct 2011	3,682	26.8	35.0	6.9	2.7	2.0	2.7	23.8	8.2
Metroscopia/El País	21–22 Feb 2011	804	36.0	49.0	–	–	–	15.0		13.0
IESA/CSIC	18 Oct–18 Nov 2010	3,655	25.8	35.0	6.1	2.8	1.6	1.4	27.4	9.2
GESPA/PP	20–26 Sep 2010	1,111	27.6	33.4	6.8	5.3	1.1	2.3	26.9	5.8
CADPEA/UGR	7 Jun–6 Jul 2010	3,200	28.8	28.3	8.1	3.5	1.8	2.3	27.3	0.5
Metroscopia/El País	15–18 Feb 2010	804	37.0	42.0	–	–	–	21.0		5.0
IESA/CSIC	1–30 Nov 2009	3,645	31.0	31.2	6.3	3.2	1.9	2.0	24.5	0.2
Metroscopia/El País	10–12 Feb 2009	800	43.0	42.0	–	–	–	15.0		1.0
IESA/CSIC	10 Nov–5 Dec 2008	3,658	35.0	29.7	6.2	3.0	–	26.1		5.3

=== Victory likelihood ===
The table below lists opinion polling on the perceived likelihood of victory for each party in the event of a regional election taking place.

Polling firm/Commissioner	Fieldwork date	Sample size	PSOE–A	PP	IULV	PA	UPyD	Other/ None	Question	Lead
GAD3	19 Mar 2012	?	22.0	63.0	–	–	–	15.0		41.0
Opinión 2000/Cadena SER	12–13 Mar 2012	800	12.9	65.4	0.9	0.3	0.3	0.1	20.3	52.5
IMC/ABC	7–12 Mar 2012	1,000	20.0	62.9	–	–	–	0.6	16.5	42.9
Commentia/Grupo Joly	13–29 Feb 2012	1,001	18.5	57.7	–	–	–	23.8		39.2
CIS	15–27 Feb 2012	3,139	18.9	57.0	0.9	0.2	0.0	0.2	22.8	38.1
GESPA/PP	6–22 Feb 2012	2,000	19.7	61.8	–	–	–	0.4	18.2	42.1
IMC/ABC	16–24 Jan 2012	1,500	19.4	64.6	–	–	–	16.0		45.2
Commentia/Grupo Joly	18–24 Oct 2011	501	19.8	58.5	0.2	0.0	–	0.0	21.6	38.7
IESA/CSIC	26 Sep–21 Oct 2011	3,682	16.9	61.7	0.3	0.5	0.1	0.3	20.1	44.8
IMC/ABC	10–20 Feb 2011	1,600	37.9	47.2	–	–	–	14.9		9.3
Commentia/Grupo Joly	9–16 Feb 2011	500	36.8	40.0	0.4	0.0	–	0.2	22.6	3.2
IESA/CSIC	18 Oct–18 Nov 2010	3,655	35.5	34.5	0.7	0.4	0.3	0.4	28.3	1.0
Commentia/Grupo Joly	21–27 Oct 2010	502	49.4	31.3	0.2	0.2	–	0.0	18.9	18.1
CADPEA/UGR	7 Jun–6 Jul 2010	3,200	54.9	26.9	0.5	0.1	0.1	0.3	17.2	28.0
Commentia/Grupo Joly	10–15 Jun 2010	806	43.6	35.7	0.2	0.5	–	0.2	19.8	7.9
IMC/ABC	8–12 Jun 2010	817	40.0	41.6	–	–	–	18.4		1.6
Commentia/Grupo Joly	9–15 Feb 2010	801	46.3	32.6	0.1	0.1	–	0.1	20.7	13.7
IMC/ABC	25 Jan–12 Feb 2010	1,600	52.6	32.0	–	–	–	15.4		20.6
IESA/CSIC	1–30 Nov 2009	3,645	52.1	20.5	0.6	0.5	0.1	0.4	25.9	31.6
IMC/ABC	5–9 Feb 2009	1,600	72.9	9.8	–	–	–	0.6	16.7	63.1
IESA/CSIC	10 Nov–5 Dec 2008	3,658	62.8	12.8	0.8	0.3	–	23.3		50.0

=== Preferred President ===
The table below lists opinion polling on leader preferences to become president of the Regional Government of Andalusia.

Polling firm/Commissioner	Fieldwork date	Sample size						Other/ None/ Not care	Question	Lead
Polling firm/Commissioner	Fieldwork date	Sample size	Griñán PSOE–A	Arenas PP	Valderas IULV	González PA	Herrán UPyD	Other/ None/ Not care	Question	Lead
Metroscopia/El País	6–15 Mar 2012	1,200	34.0	42.0	–	–	–	24.0		8.0
Opinión 2000/Cadena SER	12–13 Mar 2012	800	30.6	39.3	6.3	–	–	12.9	11.0	8.7
CIS	15–27 Feb 2012	3,139	30.7	29.4	8.6	–	–	7.0	24.3	1.7
GESPA/PP	6–22 Feb 2012	2,000	27.4	36.4	5.7	3.2	2.6	8.2	16.7	9.0
IMOP/PSOE	4–10 Jul 2011	1,514	47.1	25.0	–	–	–	27.9		22.1

=== Predicted President ===
The table below lists opinion polling on the perceived likelihood for each leader to become president.

Polling firm/Commissioner	Fieldwork date	Sample size				Other/ None/ Not care	Question	Lead
Polling firm/Commissioner	Fieldwork date	Sample size	Griñán PSOE–A	Arenas PP	Valderas IULV	Other/ None/ Not care	Question	Lead
Opinión 2000/Cadena SER	12–13 Mar 2012	800	20.1	60.3	1.4	0.9	17.4	40.2

== Voter turnout ==
The table below shows registered voter turnout during the election. Figures for election day do not include non-resident citizens, while final figures do.

Province	Time (Election day)									Final		
Province	14:00			18:00			20:00			Final		
Province	2008	2012	+/–	2008	2012	+/–	2008	2012	+/–	2008	2012	+/–
Almería	40.32%	29.23%	−11.09	60.52%	45.97%	−14.55	74.66%	60.51%	−14.15	72.66%	56.97%	−15.69
Cádiz	37.19%	25.76%	−11.43	55.85%	41.86%	−13.99	68.12%	54.29%	−13.83	67.31%	53.22%	−14.09
Córdoba	39.91%	31.85%	−8.06	60.88%	50.23%	−10.65	76.62%	66.50%	−10.12	75.62%	66.50%	−9.12
Granada	39.98%	30.86%	−9.12	61.01%	49.43%	−11.58	75.89%	65.43%	−10.46	74.16%	62.44%	−11.72
Huelva	36.24%	27.02%	−9.22	55.62%	44.13%	−11.49	70.40%	60.84%	−9.56	70.51%	60.05%	−10.46
Jaén	38.97%	32.90%	−6.07	61.25%	52.36%	−8.89	79.26%	70.74%	−8.52	78.50%	69.56%	−8.94
Málaga	39.93%	28.09%	−11.84	59.49%	44.67%	−14.82	72.31%	58.05%	−14.26	71.19%	56.33%	−14.86
Seville	36.26%	29.97%	−6.29	60.72%	49.54%	−11.18	74.38%	64.93%	−9.45	73.71%	64.00%	−9.71
Total	39.07%	29.30%	–9.77	59.51%	47.21%	–12.30	73.65%	62.23%	–11.42	72.67%	60.78%	–11.89

== Results ==
=== Overall ===
← Summary of the 25 March 2012 Parliament of Andalusia election results →
Parties and alliances	Popular vote			Seats	
Parties and alliances	Votes	%	±pp	Total	+/−
People's Party (PP)	1,570,833	40.67	+2.22	50	+3
Spanish Socialist Workers' Party of Andalusia (PSOE–A)	1,527,923	39.56	−8.85	47	−9
United Left/The Greens–Assembly for Andalusia (IULV–CA)	438,372	11.35	+4.29	12	+6
Union, Progress and Democracy (UPyD)	129,407	3.35	+2.73	0	±0
Andalusian Party (PA)^{1}	96,770	2.51	−0.25	0	±0
Equo (Equo)	20,383	0.53	New	0	±0
Animalist Party Against Mistreatment of Animals (PACMA)	8,781	0.23	New	0	±0
Blank Seats (EB)	5,660	0.15	New	0	±0
Hartos.org (Hartos.org)	4,966	0.13	New	0	±0
Communist Party of the Peoples of Spain (PCPE)	4,119	0.11	+0.05	0	±0
We Won't Pay this Crisis (ECNP)	2,680	0.07	New	0	±0
Spanish Phalanx of the CNSO (FE de las JONS)	2,407	0.06	+0.02	0	±0
For a Fairer World (PUM+J)	1,704	0.04	New	0	±0
Andalusian Platform–Citizen Forum (FC)	1,634	0.04	New	0	±0
Liberal Democratic Centre (CDL)	1,406	0.04	New	0	±0
Regionalist Party for Eastern Andalusia (PRAO)	1,071	0.03	New	0	±0
Internationalist Solidarity and Self-Management (SAIn)	1,040	0.03	−0.03	0	±0
Communist Unification of Spain (UCE)	1,026	0.03	New	0	±0
Humanist Party (PH)	896	0.02	−0.07	0	±0
Andalusian Horticulture Party (PHAN)	832	0.02	New	0	±0
Socialists and Republicans (SyR)	787	0.02	New	0	±0
Andalusian Convergence (CAnda)	762	0.02	−0.15	0	±0
Spanish Alternative (AES)	653	0.02	New	0	±0
Citizens of Democratic Centre (CCD)	643	0.02	New	0	±0
Republican Social Movement (MSR)	628	0.02	New	0	±0
Democratic Majority (MD)	515	0.01	New	0	±0
Family and Life Party (PFyV)	408	0.01	−0.01	0	±0
Engine and Sports Alternative (AMD)	362	0.01	New	0	±0
Andalusian Social Democratic Party (PSDA)	345	0.01	−0.02	0	±0
Group and Union for the Progress of Almeria (AUPAL)	216	0.01	New	0	±0
Andalusian Nationalist People (PNdeA)	156	0.00	New	0	±0
Regionalist Call for Andalusia (CReA)	146	0.00	New	0	±0
Andalusian Solidary Independent Republican Party (RISA)	135	0.00	New	0	±0
Blank ballots	35,081	0.91	−0.15		
Total	3,862,747			109	±0
Valid votes	3,862,747	99.42	+0.05		
Invalid votes	22,390	0.58	−0.05		
Votes cast / turnout	3,885,137	60.78	−11.89		
Abstentions	2,507,483	39.22	+11.89		
Registered voters	6,392,620				
Sources
Footnotes: ^{1} Andalusian Party results are compared to Andalusian Coalition totals in the 2008 election.

Popular vote
PP	40.67%
PSOE–A	39.56%
IULV–CA	11.35%
UPyD	3.35%
PA	2.51%
Others	1.67%
Blank ballots	0.91%

Seats
PP	45.87%
PSOE–A	43.12%
IULV–CA	11.01%

=== Distribution by constituency ===
Constituency	PP		PSOE–A		IULV–CA	
Constituency	%	S	%	S	%	S
Almería	51.2	7	35.4	4	7.1	1
Cádiz	40.5	7	35.6	6	12.7	2
Córdoba	39.7	5	38.9	5	13.3	2
Granada	43.5	6	39.5	6	10.0	1
Huelva	38.6	5	43.4	5	10.9	1
Jaén	41.1	5	44.5	5	8.8	1
Málaga	43.7	8	35.3	7	12.2	2
Seville	35.3	7	43.1	9	12.2	2
Total	40.7	50	39.6	47	11.3	12

== Aftermath ==
=== Government formation ===
On 3 May 2012, as a result of the PSOE–IU coalition agreement, José Antonio Griñán was re-elected as regional President. One IU deputy, Juan Manuel Sánchez Gordillo, cast an invalid vote in protest for not being able to elect a candidate of his own party.

Investiture; Nomination of José Antonio Griñán (PSOE–A)
Ballot →	3 May 2012 (Note: 1 IULV–CA MP cast an invalid ballot.)
Required majority →	55 out of 109
Yes: • PSOE–A (47); • IULV–CA (11)	58 / 109
No: • PP (50)	50 / 109
Abstentions	0 / 109
Absentees	0 / 109

=== 2013 investiture ===
In July 2013, President Griñán announced he was resigning from his office. As regional minister Susana Díaz was the only person able to gather the required endorsements to run in the primary election that was held to elect Griñán's successor, she was unanimously proclaimed as the party's candidate for the Presidency of the Regional Government of Andalusia. As a result, on 5 September 2013 the Parliament of Andalusia elected Díaz as new regional premier.

Investiture; Nomination of Susana Díaz (PSOE–A)
Ballot →	5 September 2013 (Note: 1 IULV–CA MP did not cast any ballot.)
Required majority →	55 out of 109
Yes: • PSOE–A (47); • IULV–CA (11)	58 / 109
No: • PP (48)	48 / 109
Abstentions	0 / 109
Absentees: • PP (2)	2 / 109

== Bibliography ==
- Ley Orgánica 5/1985, de 19 de junio, del Régimen Electoral General (Organic Law 5/1985). Official State Gazette (in Spanish). 19 June 1985 [version as of 16 July 2011]. BOE-A-1985-11672.
- Ley 1/1986, de 2 de enero, Electoral de Andalucía (Law 1/1986). Official State Gazette (in Spanish). 2 January 1986 [version as of 15 December 2011]. BOE-A-1986-2788.
- Ley 6/2006, de 24 de octubre, del Gobierno de la Comunidad Autónoma de Andalucía (Law 6/2006). Official State Gazette (in Spanish). 24 October 2006 [version as of 11 December 2008]. BOE-A-2006-20848.
- Ley Orgánica 2/2007, de 19 de marzo, de reforma del Estatuto de Autonomía para Andalucía (Organic Law 2/2007). Official State Gazette (in Spanish). 19 March 2007 [version as of 11 April 2011]. BOE-A-2007-5825.
- Decreto del Presidente 1/2012, de 30 de enero, de disolución del Parlamento de Andalucía y de convocatoria de elecciones (PDF) (Decree 1/2012). Official Gazette of the Regional Government of Andalusia (in Spanish). 30 January 2012.
