= Republican Alternative (Spain) =

Left-wing political party in Spain

Republican Alternative Alternativa Republicana
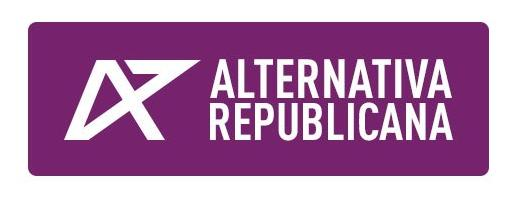
- Abbreviation: ALTER
- General Secretary: Fernando Fernández Rodríguez
- Founded: 29 May 2013
- Headquarters: C/ Maestro Tomás Bretón nº 2 - 2º D, Málaga
- Ideology: Republicanism; Socialism; Federalism; Laïcité; Eco-socialism; Feminism
- Political position: Left-wing
- National affiliation: Feminist Republican Alliance (with PFE) (2021-2023); Broad Front (since 2026)
- Colours: Red; Yellow; Purple
- Anthem: "Himno de Riego"
- Municipal councillors: 2 / 67,611

Party flag

Website
- alternativarepublicana.es

Republican Alternative (Spanish: Alternativa Republicana, ALTER) is a Spanish political party formed in 2015 by the merger of various small left-wing republican parties. The Left Republican Party (Catalan: Partit Republicà d'Esquerra, PRE) is its branch in Catalonia.

== History ==
AR was formed by Spanish Republican Democratic Action, a faction of Republican Left, and the Catalan left-wing Republican Party. The founding congress was held in Vallecas on May 25 and 26, 2013. In its Statutes, AR is ideologically defined as left-wing, democratic, republican, radical, secular, federalist and environmentalist.

In the municipal elections of 2015, AR gained two local councillors, Pedro Gómez in Segorbe (Valencian Community) and Gabriel Salguero Lafuente in Montgat (Catalonia).
