= Andalusian People's Initiative =

Andalusian People's Initiative Iniciativa del Pueblo Andaluz
- Founded: 2016
- Registered: 1 February 2018
- Split from: IULV-CA
- Ideology: Green politics Andalusian nationalism
- Political position: Left-wing
- National affiliation: Sumar (2023–2026); Broad Front (since 2026)
- Regional affiliation: Andaluces Levantaos (2021–2022); Por Andalucía (since 2022)
- Congress of Deputies (Andalusian seats): 0 / 61
- Parliament of Andalusia: 0 / 109

Website
- iniciativadelpuebloandaluz.org

Andalusian People's Initiative (Spanish: Iniciativa del Pueblo Andaluz, IdPA) is a political party in Andalusia. At the national level it has been a member of the Sumar and Broad Front alliances, while regionally ran together with Equo in the 2018 regional election, and has been a member of the Andaluces Levantaos and Por Andalucía alliances.
