= Andaluces Levantaos =

Arise Andalusians Andaluces Levantaos
- Founded: 2 December 2021
- Dissolved: 25 April 2022
- Merged into: Por Andalucía
- Ideology: Green politics Social democracy Andalusian nationalism
- Political position: Centre-left to left-wing
- Members: See list of members

Website
- andaluceslevantaos.org

Andaluces Levantaos (English: "Arise Andalusians") was an Andalusian-based electoral alliance formed by Más País, Andalucía por Sí (AxSí) and Andalusian People's Initiative (IdPA) to contest the 2022 Andalusian regional election. The alliance aimed at representing ecologist, feminist and social democratic voters.

Most of the alliance's members integrated themselves within the larger Por Andalucía alliance with Podemos and United Left/The Greens.

== Composition ==
December 2021–April 2022

Party
More Country Andalusia (Más País–Andalucía)
Andalusia by Herself (AxSí)
Andalusian People's Initiative (IdPA)

Since April 2022

Party
Andalusia by Herself (AxSí)
Andalusian Convergence (CAnda)
Linense Andalusians (AL)
Let's Win Chiclana (GCH)
Between All Andalusia (Andalucía Entre Tod@s)

== Electoral performance ==
=== Parliament of Andalusia ===
Parliament of Andalusia
Election	Leading candidate	Votes	%	Seats	+/–	Government
2022	Modesto González	11,980	0.32 (#9)	0 / 109	0 (Note: Compared to the combined totals of Andalusia by Herself and Andalusian Convergence in the 2018 regional election.)	No seats
