= Andalusian Nation =

Andalusian Nation Nación Andaluza
- Leader: Carlos Ríos
- Founded: 1991
- Headquarters: Granada
- Newspaper: Independencia
- Youth wing: Infantist Youth (Juventudes Infantistas)
- Ideology: Andalusian nationalism Independentism; Socialism; Anti-imperialism
- Political position: Far-left
- Colors

Party flag

Website
- nacionandaluza.org

Andalusian Nation (in Spanish: Nación Andaluza; NA) is an Andalusian nationalist, independentist and socialist political party in Andalusia (Spain). Its organ of expression is the magazine Independencia. NA is a founding member of the former coalition National Assembly of Andalucía, which the organization left in 2004.

== Elections ==
- Andalusian parliamentary election, 1994: 9,690 votes (0.27%)
- Andalusian parliamentary election, 1996: 5,846 votes (0.14%)
- Spanish general election, 1996: 3,505 votes (0.08%)
- Andalusian regional election, 2018: 5,015 votes (0.14%)
- Andalusian regional election, 2022: 2930 votes (0.08%)
