= Andalusian Convergence =

Andalusian Convergence Convergencia Andaluza
- Chairman: Ángel Ortega
- Founded: May 2006
- Dissolved: 2013
- Merged into: Andalusian Party
- Ideology: Andalusian nationalism Social democracy
- Colors

Website
- www.convergencia-andaluza.es

Andalusian Convergence (in Spanish: Convergencia Andaluza; CAnda) was an Andalusian nationalist political party in Andalusia.

== History ==
CAnda emerged in May 2006 as a split of the Andalusian Party. It also had among its ranks with politicians like Juan Carlos Benavides, former mayor of Almuñécar (Granada), and Luis Manuel Rubiales, former mayor of Motril, from the PSOE-A.

In the municipal elections of 2007, they obtained 6,994 votes and 10 councilors (all in Almuñécar). In the 2011 elections in the same town, councilors fell to 7 of 21, although CAnda still was the most voted political party. CAnda also gained 1879 votes in Motril (2 councilors) and 698 votes in Albuñol (2 councilors).

In 2013 CAnda rejoined the Andalusian Party. After the dissolution of the Andalusian Party in 2015 the party was reactivated. CAnda joined the coalition Andaluces Levantaos for the 2022 Andalusian regional election.
