= First government of Susana Díaz =

1st government of Susana Díaz
- 12th Government of Andalusia
- 2013–2015
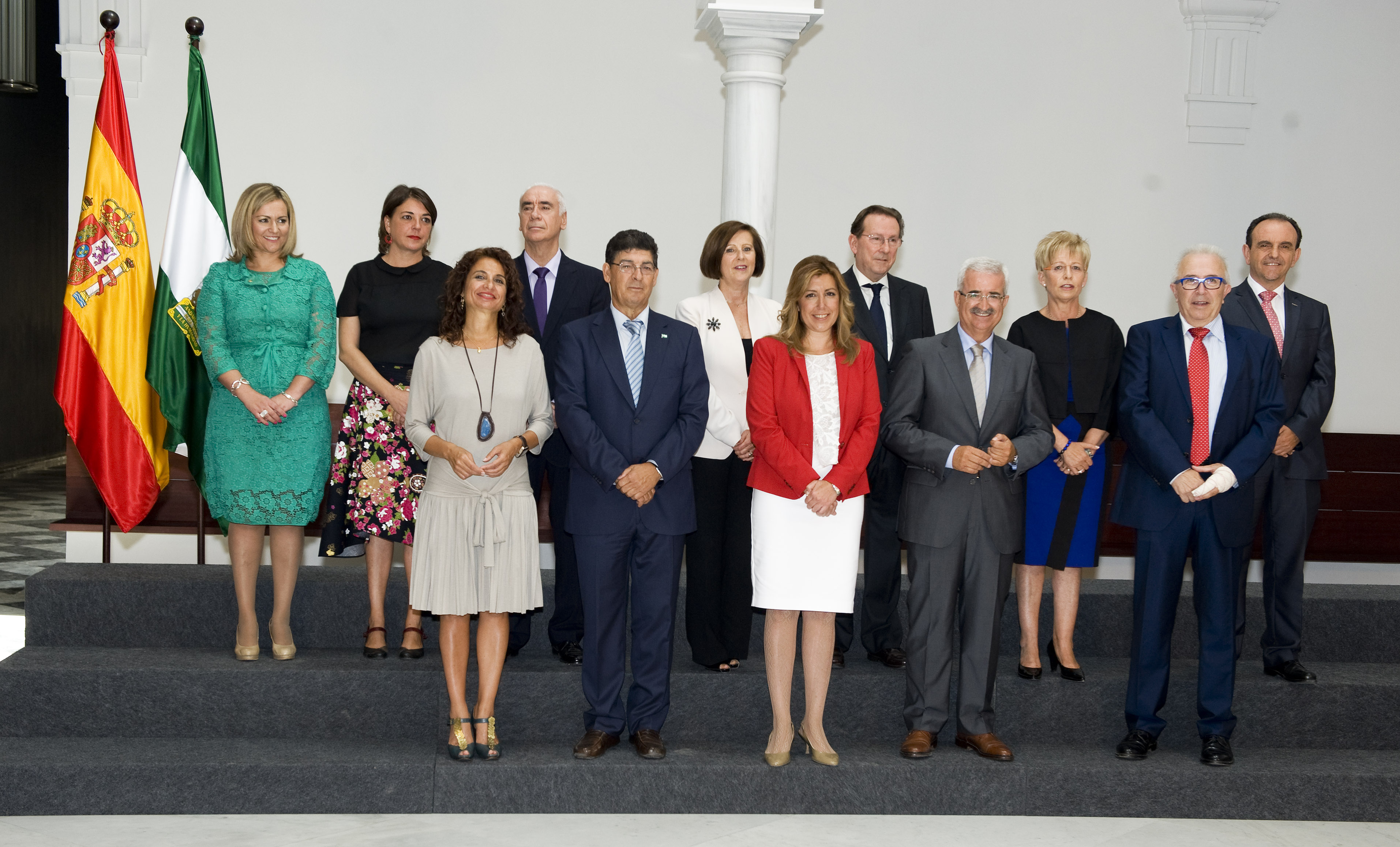
- The government in September 2013.
- Date formed: 10 September 2013
- Date dissolved: 18 June 2015

People and organisations
- Monarch: Juan Carlos I (2013–2014); Felipe VI (2014–2015)
- President: Susana Díaz
- Vice President: Diego Valderas (2013–2015); Manuel Jiménez Barrios (2015)
- No. of ministers: 11 (Note: Does not include the President.)
- Total no. of members: 11
- Member parties: PSOE–A; IULV–CA (2013–2015)
- Status in legislature: Majority coalition government (2013–2015); Minority government (2015)
- Opposition party: PP
- Opposition leader: Juan Ignacio Zoido (2013–2014); Juan Manuel Moreno (2014–2015)

History
- Election: 2012 regional election
- Outgoing election: 2015 regional election
- Legislature term: 9th Parliament
- Predecessor: Griñán II
- Successor: Díaz II

The first government of Susana Díaz was formed on 10 September 2013 following the latter's election as President of Andalusia by the Parliament of Andalusia on 5 September and her swearing-in on 7 September, as a result of the resignation of the former president, José Antonio Griñán, over the erosion of the ERE scandal, a large slush fund corruption scandal involving former leading figures of the regional PSOE's branch, including former development minister Magdalena Álvarez, with former Andalusian president Manuel Chaves and himself being accused of knowing and concealing such a plot. It succeeded the second Griñán government and was the Government of Andalusia from 10 September 2013 to 18 June 2015, a total of 646 days, or 1 year, 9 months and 8 days.

Until January 2015, the cabinet comprised members of the PSOE–A (including one independent) and IULV–CA, to become the second coalition government between the two parties in the region and the fourth coalition government in the region overall. On 27 January 2015, president Díaz expelled all IU members from the cabinet under a pretext to call for a snap election amid increasing instability within the governing coalition. It was automatically dismissed on 23 March 2015 as a consequence of the 2015 regional election, but remained in acting capacity until the next government was sworn in.

== Investiture ==
Investiture; Susana Díaz (PSOE–A)
Ballot →	5 September 2013 (Note: 1 IULV–CA MP did not cast any ballot.)
Required majority →	55 out of 109
Yes: • PSOE–A (47); • IULV–CA (11)	58 / 109
No: • PP (48)	48 / 109
Abstentions	0 / 109
Abstentees: • PP (2)	2 / 109

== Council of Government ==
The Council of Government was structured into the offices for the president, the vice president and 11 ministries.

← Díaz I Government → (10 September 2013 – 18 June 2015)
Portfolio	Name	Party	Took office	Left office	Ref.
President	Susana Díaz	PSOE–A	6 September 2013	13 June 2015	
Vice President; Minister of Local Administration and Institutional Relations	Diego Valderas	IULV–CA	10 September 2013	27 January 2015	
Minister of the Presidency	Manuel Jiménez Barrios	PSOE–A	10 September 2013	18 June 2015	
Minister of Finance and Public Administration	María Jesús Montero	PSOE–A	10 September 2013	18 June 2015	
Minister of Economy, Innovation, Science and Employment	José Sánchez Maldonado	PSOE–A	10 September 2013	18 June 2015	
Minister of Equality, Health and Social Policies	María José Sánchez Rubio	PSOE–A	10 September 2013	18 June 2015	
Minister of Education, Culture and Sports	Luciano Alonso	PSOE–A	10 September 2013	18 June 2015	
Minister of Justice and Interior	Emilio de Llera	Independent	10 September 2013	18 June 2015	
Minister of Development and Housing	Elena Cortés	IULV–CA	10 September 2013	27 January 2015	
Minister of Agriculture, Fisheries and Rural Development	Elena Víboras	PSOE–A	10 September 2013	18 June 2015	
Minister of Environment and Territory Planning	María Jesús Serrano	PSOE–A	10 September 2013	18 June 2015	
Minister of Tourism and Trade	Rafael Rodríguez Bermúdez	IULV–CA	10 September 2013	27 January 2015	
=== Changes January 2015 ===
Portfolio	Name	Party	Took office	Left office	Ref.
Vice President; Minister of the Presidency	Manuel Jiménez Barrios	PSOE–A	27 January 2015	18 June 2015	
Minister of Local Administration and Institutional Relations	Manuel Jiménez Barrios served as surrogate from 27 January to 18 June 2015.				
Minister of Development and Housing	María Jesús Serrano served as surrogate from 27 January to 18 June 2015.				
Minister of Tourism and Trade	Luciano Alonso served as surrogate from 27 January to 18 June 2015.				

== Notes ==
Preceded by Griñán II	Regional Government of Andalusia; 2013–2015	Succeeded by Díaz II
