= Second government of Susana Díaz =

2nd government of Susana Díaz
- 13th Government of Andalusia
- 2015-2019
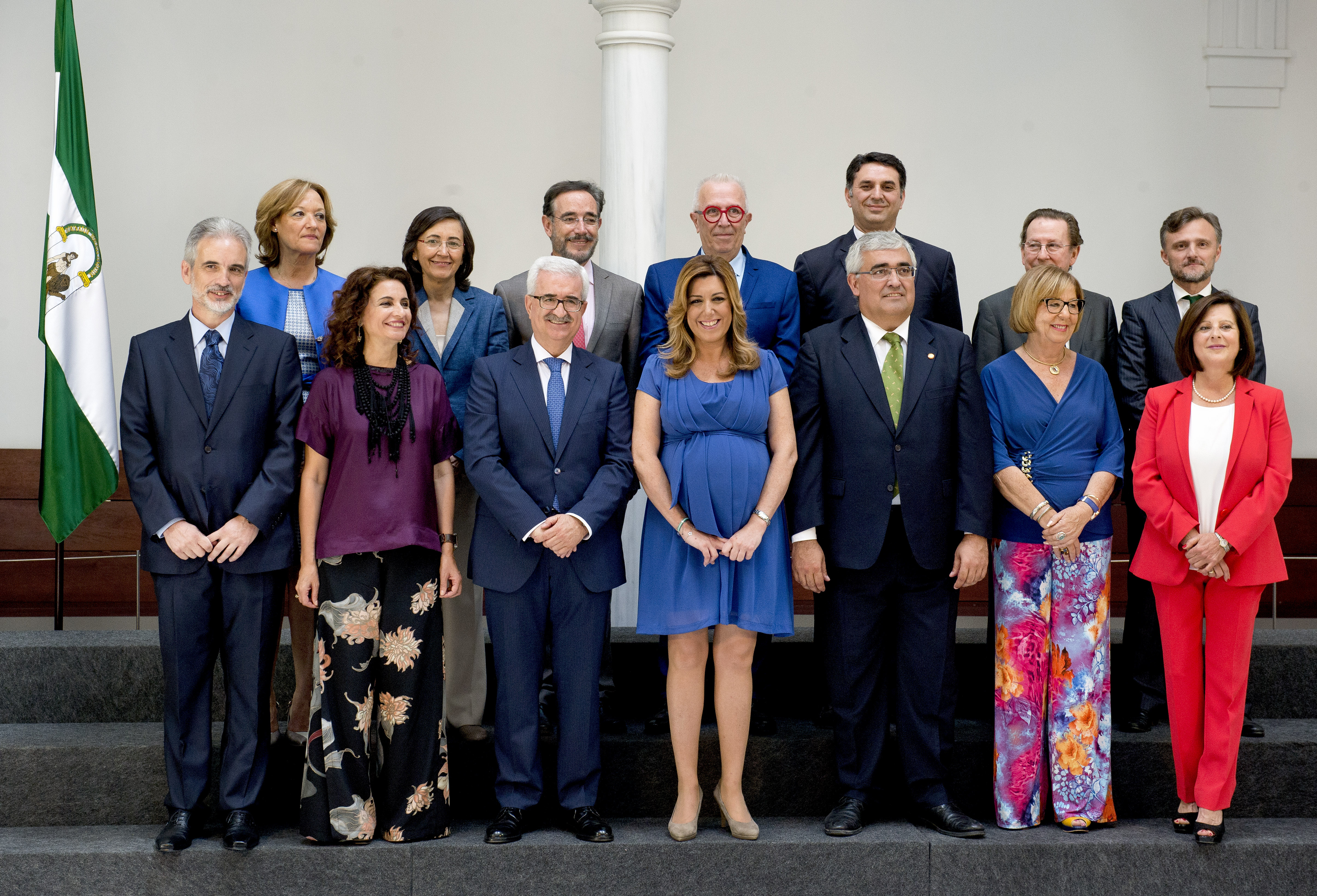
- The government in June 2015.
- Date formed: 18 June 2015
- Date dissolved: 22 January 2019

People and organisations
- Monarch: Felipe VI
- President: Susana Díaz
- Vice President: Manuel Jiménez Barrios
- No. of ministers: 13 (Note: Does not include the President.)
- Total no. of members: 19
- Member party: PSOE–A
- Status in legislature: Minority government
- Opposition party: PP
- Opposition leader: Juan Manuel Moreno

History
- Election: 2015 regional election
- Outgoing election: 2018 regional election
- Legislature term: 10th Parliament
- Predecessor: Díaz I
- Successor: Moreno I

The second government of Susana Díaz was formed on 18 June 2015 following the latter's reelection as President of Andalusia by the Parliament of Andalusia on 11 June and her swearing-in on 14 June, as a result of the Socialist Party of Andalusia (PSOE-A) emerging as the largest parliamentary force at the 2015 Andalusian regional election. It succeeded the first Díaz government and was the Government of Andalusia from 18 June 2015 to 22 January 2019, a total of 1,314 days, or 3 years, 7 months and 4 days.

The cabinet comprised members of the PSOE–A and a number of independents. It was automatically dismissed on 3 December 2018 as a consequence of the 2018 regional election, but remained in acting capacity until the next government was sworn in.

== Investiture ==
Investiture; Susana Díaz (PSOE–A)
Ballot →	5 May 2015	8 May 2015	14 May 2015	11 June 2015
Required majority →	55 out of 109	Simple	Simple	Simple
Yes: • PSOE–A (47); • C's (9) (on 11 Jun)	47 / 109	47 / 109	47 / 109	56 / 109
No: • PP (33) (31 on 11 Jun); • Podemos (15); • C's (9) (until 14 May); • IULV–CA (5)	62 / 109	62 / 109	62 / 109	51 / 109
Abstentions	0 / 109	0 / 109	0 / 109	0 / 109
Absentees: • PP (2) (on 11 Jun)	0 / 109	0 / 109	0 / 109	2 / 109

== Council of Government ==
The Council of Government was structured into the offices for the president, the vice president and 13 ministries.

← Díaz II Government → (18 June 2015 – 22 January 2019)
Portfolio	Name	Party	Took office	Left office	Ref.
President	Susana Díaz	PSOE–A	13 June 2015	18 January 2019	
Vice President; Minister of the Presidency and Local Administration	Manuel Jiménez Barrios	PSOE–A	18 June 2015	9 June 2017	
Minister of Economy and Knowledge	Antonio Ramírez de Arellano	Independent	18 June 2015	6 June 2018	
Minister of Finance and Public Administration	María Jesús Montero	PSOE–A	18 June 2015	6 June 2018	
Minister of Education	Adelaida de la Calle	Independent	18 June 2015	9 June 2017	
Minister of Health	Aquilino Alonso	PSOE–A	18 June 2015	9 June 2017	
Minister of Equality and Social Policies	María José Sánchez Rubio	PSOE–A	18 June 2015	22 January 2019	
Minister of Employment, Business and Trade	José Sánchez Maldonado	PSOE–A	18 June 2015	9 June 2017	
Minister of Development and Housing	Felipe López García	PSOE–A	18 June 2015	22 January 2019	
Minister of Tourism and Sport	Francisco Javier Fernández	PSOE–A	18 June 2015	22 January 2019	
Minister of Culture	Rosa Aguilar	PSOE–A	18 June 2015	9 June 2017	
Minister of Justice and Interior	Emilio de Llera	Independent	18 June 2015	9 June 2017	
Minister of Agriculture, Fisheries and Rural Development	Carmen Ortiz Rivas	PSOE–A	18 June 2015	9 June 2017	
Minister of the Environment and Territory Planning	José Fiscal	PSOE–A	18 June 2015	22 January 2019	
=== Changes June 2017 ===
Portfolio	Name	Party	Took office	Left office	Ref.
Vice President; Minister of the Presidency, Local Administration and Democratic Memory	Manuel Jiménez Barrios	PSOE–A	9 June 2017	22 January 2019	
Minister of Education	Sonia Gaya	PSOE–A	9 June 2017	22 January 2019	
Minister of Health	Marina Álvarez	Independent	9 June 2017	22 January 2019	
Minister of Justice and Interior	Rosa Aguilar	PSOE–A	9 June 2017	22 January 2019	
Minister of Employment, Business and Trade	Javier Carnero	PSOE–A	9 June 2017	22 January 2019	
Minister of Culture	Miguel Ángel Vázquez	PSOE–A	9 June 2017	22 January 2019	
Minister of Agriculture, Fisheries and Rural Development	Rodrigo Sánchez Haro	PSOE–A	9 June 2017	22 January 2019	
=== Changes June 2018 ===
Minister of Economy, Finance and Public Administration	Antonio Ramírez de Arellano	Independent (Note: Joined the PSOE–A in June 2018.)	6 June 2018	22 January 2019	
Minister of Knowledge, Research and University	Lina Gálvez	Independent	6 June 2018	22 January 2019	

== Notes ==
Preceded by Díaz I	Regional Government of Andalusia; 2015–2019	Succeeded by Moreno I
