= First government of Juanma Moreno =

1st government of Juanma Moreno
- Government of Andalusia
- 2019–2022
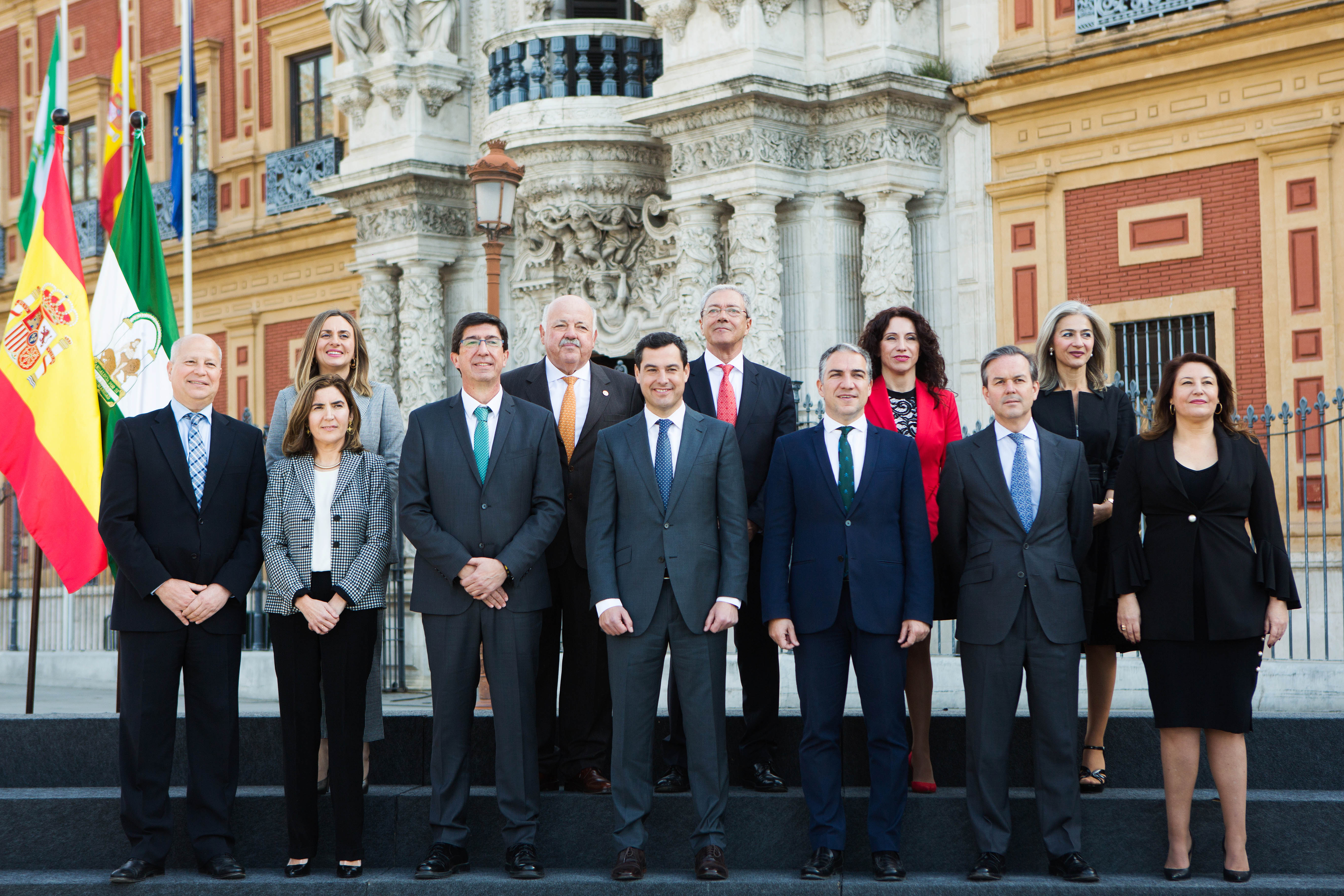
- The government in January 2019.
- Date formed: 22 January 2019
- Date dissolved: 26 July 2022

People and organisations
- Monarch: Felipe VI
- President: Juanma Moreno
- Vice President: Juan Marín
- No. of ministers: 11 (Note: Does not include the President.)
- Total no. of members: 13
- Member party: PP; Cs
- Status in legislature: Minority coalition government
- Opposition party: PSOE–A
- Opposition leader: Susana Díaz (2019–2021); Juan Espadas (2021–2022)

History
- Election: 2018 regional election
- Outgoing election: 2022 regional election
- Legislature term: 11th Parliament
- Budget: 2019, 2020, 2021
- Predecessor: Díaz II
- Successor: Moreno II

The first government of Juanma Moreno was formed on 22 January 2019, following the latter's election as President of the Regional Government of Andalusia by the Parliament of Andalusia on 16 January and his swearing-in on 18 January, as a result of the People's Party (PP) and Citizens (Cs) being able to muster a majority of seats in the Parliament with external support from Vox following the 2018 Andalusian regional election. It succeeded the second Díaz government and was the Regional Government of Andalusia from 22 January 2019 to 26 July 2022, a total of 1,281 days, or 3 years, 6 months and 4 days.

The cabinet comprised members of the PP and Cs, as well as a number of independents proposed by both parties. It was automatically dismissed on 20 June 2022 as a consequence of the 2022 regional election, but remained in acting capacity until the next government was sworn in.

== Investiture ==
Investiture; Juanma Moreno (PP)
Ballot →	16 January 2019
Required majority →	55 out of 109
Yes: • PP (26); • Cs (21); • Vox (12)	59 / 109
No: • PSOE–A (33); • AA (17)	50 / 109
Abstentions	0 / 109
Absentees	0 / 109

== Council of Government ==
The Council of Government was structured into the offices for the president, the vice president and 11 ministries.

← Moreno I Government → (22 January 2019 – 26 July 2022)
Portfolio	Name	Party	Took office	Left office	Ref.
President	Juanma Moreno	PP	18 January 2019	22 July 2022	
Vice President; Minister of Tourism, Regeneration, Justice and Local Administration	Juan Marín	Cs	22 January 2019	26 July 2022	
Minister of the Presidency, Public Administration and Interior	Elías Bendodo	PP	22 January 2019	8 February 2019	
Minister of Employment, Training and Self-Employment	Rocío Blanco	Independent	22 January 2019	26 July 2022	
Minister of Finance, Industry and Energy	Alberto García Valera	Independent	22 January 2019	12 February 2019	
Minister of Education and Sports	Javier Imbroda	Cs	22 January 2019	2 April 2022†	
Minister of Agriculture, Livestock, Fisheries and Sustainable Development	Carmen Crespo	PP	22 January 2019	26 July 2022	
Minister of Economy, Knowledge, Business and University	Rogelio Velasco	Independent	22 January 2019	3 September 2020	
Minister of Health and Families	Jesús Aguirre	PP	22 January 2019	14 July 2022	
Minister of Equality, Social Policies and Conciliation	Rocío Ruiz	Cs	22 January 2019	26 July 2022	
Minister of Development, Infrastructures and Territory Planning	Marifrán Carazo	PP	22 January 2019	26 July 2022	
Minister of Culture and Historical Heritage	Patricia del Pozo	PP	22 January 2019	26 July 2022	
=== Changes February 2019 ===
Portfolio	Name	Party	Took office	Left office	Ref.
Minister of the Presidency, Public Administration and Interior; Spokesperson of the Government	Elías Bendodo	PP	8 February 2019	26 July 2022	
Minister of Finance, Industry and Energy	Juan Bravo Baena	PP	12 February 2019	3 September 2020	
=== Changes September 2020 ===
Portfolio	Name	Party	Took office	Left office	Ref.
Minister of Finance and European Financing (Note: On 3 September 2020, the ministries of Finance, Industry and Energy and Economy, Knowledge, Business and University were reorganized as the Finance and European Financing and Economic Transformation, Industry, Knowledge and University departments, respectively.)	Juan Bravo Baena	PP	3 September 2020	26 July 2022	
Minister of Economic Transformation, Industry, Knowledge and University	Rogelio Velasco	Independent	3 September 2020	26 July 2022	
=== Changes April 2022 ===
Portfolio	Name	Party	Took office	Left office	Ref.
Minister of Education and Sports	Juan Marín served as surrogate from 3 to 6 April 2022.				
Minister of Education and Sports	Manuel Cardenete	Cs	6 April 2022	26 July 2022	
=== Changes July 2022 ===
Portfolio	Name	Party	Took office	Left office	Ref.
Minister of Health and Families	Elías Bendodo served as surrogate from 14 to 26 July 2022.				

== Notes ==
Preceded by Díaz II	Regional Government of Andalusia; 2019–2022	Succeeded by Moreno II
