= 2008 Andalusian regional election =

Election in the Spanish region of Andalusia

- 9 March 2008

All 109 seats in the Parliament of Andalusia 55 seats needed for a majority
- Opinion polls
- Registered: 6,231,087 ▲3.0%
- Turnout: 4,528,271 (72.7%) ▼2.0 pp
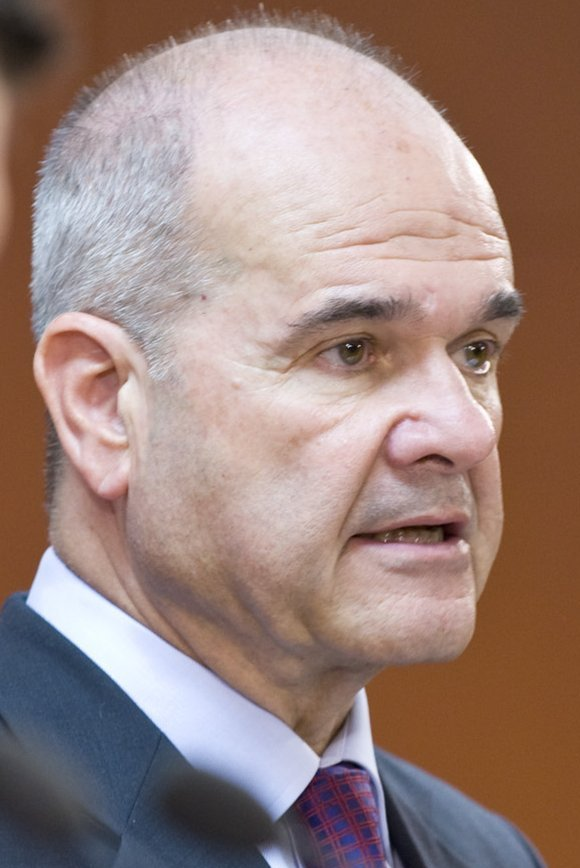

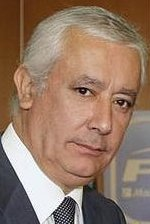

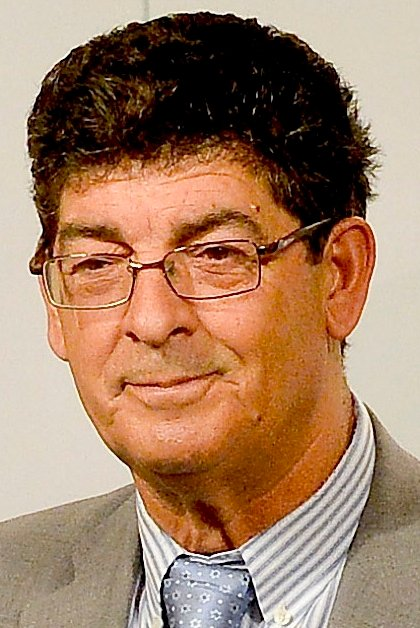
| | First party | Second party | Third party |
|---|---|---|---|
| Leader | Manuel Chaves | Javier Arenas | Diego Valderas |
| Party | PSOE–A | PP | IULV–CA |
| Leader since | 19 April 1990 | 18 April 2004 | 15 October 2000 |
| Leader's seat | Cádiz | Almería | Huelva |
| Last election | 61 seats, 50.4% | 37 seats, 31.8% | 6 seats, 7.5% |
| Seats won | 56 | 47 | 6 |
| Seat change | ▼5 | ▲10 | 0 |
| Popular vote | 2,178,296 | 1,730,154 | 317,562 |
| Percentage | 48.4% | 38.5% | 7.1% |
| Swing | ▼2.0 pp | ▲6.7 pp | ▼0.4 pp |
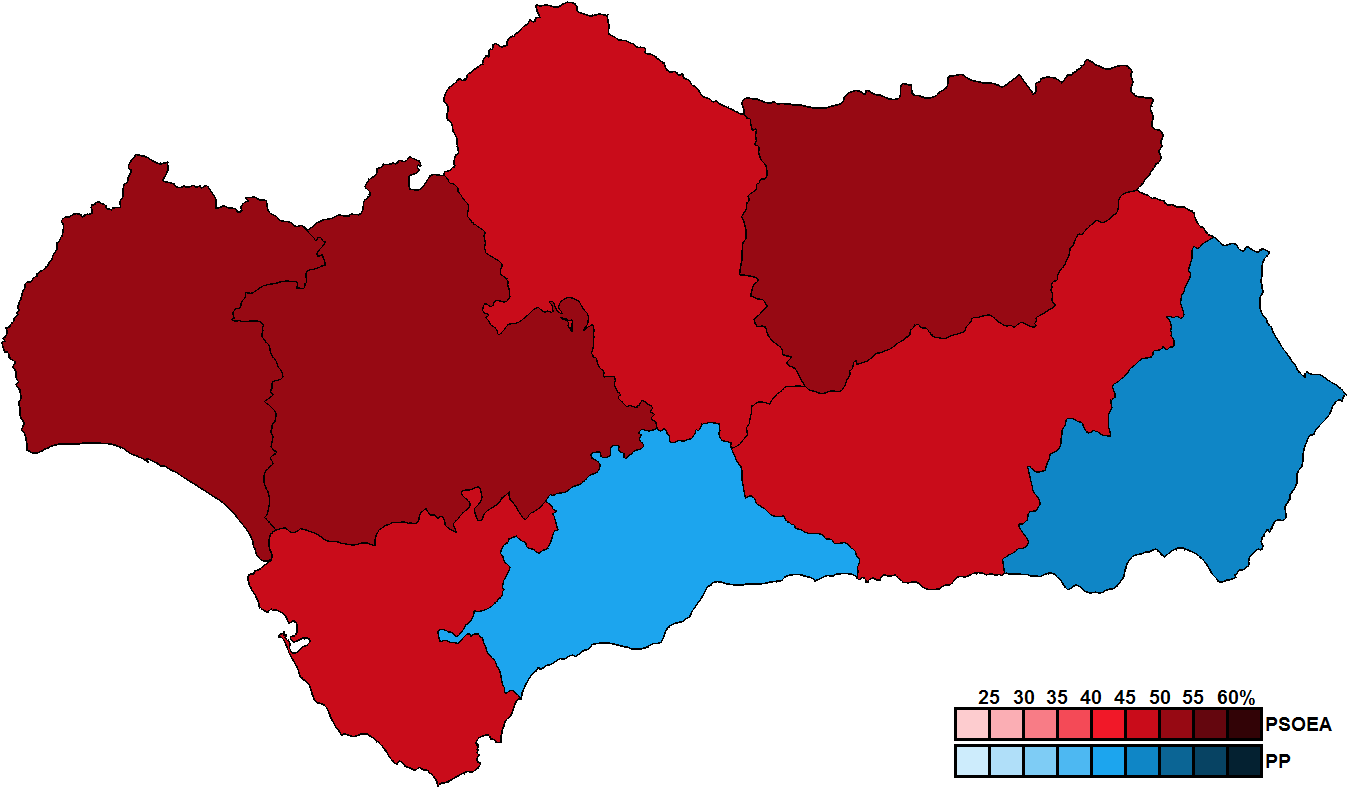
- Constituency results map for the Parliament of Andalusia
President before election
Manuel Chaves
PSOE–A
President after election
Manuel Chaves
PSOE–A

A regional election was held in Andalusia on 9 March 2008 to elect the 8th Parliament of the autonomous community. All 109 seats in the Parliament were up for election. It was held concurrently with the 2008 Spanish general election.

Incumbent President Manuel Chaves from the Spanish Socialist Workers' Party (PSOE–A) was re-elected for a sixth term in office with a slightly reduced majority. Final results showed a major breakthrough by the People's Party (PP), which gained 10 seats from 37 to 47 and scored its best result in the community at the time. United Left (IULV–CA) remained stagnant with 6 seats, whereas the Andalusian Party (PA) suffered a major drop in support and failed to enter the regional parliament for the first time.

== Background ==
With the Spanish Socialist Workers' Party (PSOE) regaining its absolute majority in Andalusia in the 2004 election, Manuel Chaves was able to govern alone again, after 10 years of minority government, having relied on the support of the Andalusian Party in the previous 8 years. Teófila Martínez, who had been PP candidate for President of the Regional Government of Andalusia in the previous two elections (1996 and 2000), was replaced by Javier Arenas as head of the Andalusian People's Party (PP). Arenas had been PP candidate in the 1994 and 1996 elections, but left the PP regional leadership in order to become Spain's Minister of Labor and Social Affairs in the Aznar cabinet and, later, Secretary-General of the People's Party.

Concurrently in 2004, José Luis Rodríguez Zapatero from PSOE was elected as Spain's new prime minister, after unexpectedly winning the 2004 general election. This meant that, for the first time since 1996, both the regional and national governments were ruled by the same party.

== Overview ==
Under the 2007 Statute of Autonomy, the Parliament of Andalusia was the unicameral legislature of the homonymous autonomous community, having legislative power in devolved matters, as well as the ability to grant or withdraw confidence from a regional president. The electoral and procedural rules were supplemented by national law provisions.

=== Date ===
The term of the Parliament of Andalusia expired four years after the date of its previous election, unless it was dissolved earlier. The election decree was required to be issued no later than 25 days before the scheduled expiration date of parliament and published on the following day in the Official Gazette of the Regional Government of Andalusia (BOJA), with election day taking place 54 days after the decree's publication (barring any date within from 1 July to 31 August). The previous election was held on 14 March 2004, which meant that the chamber's term would have expired on 14 March 2008. The election decree was required to be published in the BOJA no later than 19 February 2008, setting the latest possible date for election day on 13 April 2008.

The regional president had the prerogative to dissolve the Parliament of Andalusia at any given time and call a snap election, provided that no motion of no confidence was in process and that dissolution did not occur before one year after a previous one. In the event of an investiture process failing to elect a regional president within a two-month period from the first ballot, the Parliament was to be automatically dissolved and a fresh election called.

The Parliament of Andalusia was officially dissolved on 15 January 2008 with the publication of the corresponding decree in the BOJA, setting election day for 9 March and scheduling for the chamber to reconvene on 3 April.

=== Electoral system ===
Voting for the Parliament was based on universal suffrage, comprising all Spanish nationals over 18 years of age, registered in Andalusia and with full political rights, provided that they had not been deprived of the right to vote by a final sentence, nor were legally incapacitated.

The Parliament of Andalusia had a minimum of 109 seats, with electoral provisions fixing its size at that number. All were elected in eight multi-member constituencies—corresponding to the provinces of Almería, Cádiz, Córdoba, Granada, Huelva, Jaén, Málaga and Seville, each of which was assigned an initial minimum of eight seats and the remaining 45 distributed in proportion to population (with the number of seats in each province not exceeding two times that of any other)—using the D'Hondt method and closed-list proportional voting, with a three percent-threshold of valid votes (including blank ballots) in each constituency. The use of this electoral method resulted in a higher effective threshold depending on district magnitude and vote distribution.

As a result of the aforementioned allocation, each Parliament constituency was entitled the following seats:

| Seats | Constituencies |
|---|---|
| 18 | Seville |
| 16 | Málaga |
| 15 | Cádiz |
| 13 | Granada |
| 12 | Almería^{(+1)}, Córdoba^{(−1)}, Jaén |
| 11 | Huelva |

The law did not provide for by-elections to fill vacant seats; instead, any vacancies arising after the proclamation of candidates and during the legislative term were filled by the next candidates on the party lists or, when required, by designated substitutes.

=== Outgoing parliament ===
The table below shows the composition of the parliamentary groups in the chamber at the time of dissolution.

Parliamentary composition in January 2008
| Groups | Parties | Legislators | |
| Groups | Parties | Seats | Total |
|---|---|---|---|
| Socialist Parliamentary Group | PSOE–A | 61 | 61 |
| Andalusian People's Parliamentary Group | PP | 37 | 37 |
| United Left/The Greens Parliamentary Group | IULV–CA | 6 | 6 |
| Andalusian Parliamentary Group | PA | 5 | 5 |

== Parties and candidates ==
The electoral law allowed for parties and federations registered in the interior ministry, alliances and groupings of electors to present lists of candidates. Parties and federations intending to form an alliance were required to inform the relevant electoral commission within 10 days of the election call, whereas groupings of electors needed to secure the signature of at least one percent of the electorate in the constituencies for which they sought election, disallowing electors from signing for more than one list. Amendments in 2005 required a balanced composition of men and women in the electoral lists through the use of a zipper system.

Below is a list of the main parties and alliances which contested the election:

| Candidacy | Parties and alliances | Leading candidate | Ideology | Previous result | | Gov. | Ref. |
| Candidacy | Parties and alliances | Leading candidate | Ideology | Vote % | Seats | Gov. | Ref. |
|---|---|---|---|---|---|---|---|
| PSOE–A | List: Spanish Socialist Workers' Party of Andalusia (PSOE–A) | Manuel Chaves | Social democracy | 50.4% | 61 | Yes | |
| PP | List: People's Party (PP) | Javier Arenas | Conservatism; Christian democracy | 31.8% | 37 | No | |
| IULV–CA | List: United Left/The Greens–Assembly for Andalusia (IULV–CA) – Communist Party of Andalusia (PCA) – Collective for the Unity of Workers–Andalusian Left Bloc (CUT–BAI) – Revolutionary Workers' Party (POR) | Diego Valderas | Socialism; Communism | 7.5% | 6 | No | |
| CA | List: Andalusian Party (PA); Andalusian Forum (FA); Socialist Party of Andalusia (PSA) | Julián Álvarez | Andalusian nationalism Social democracy | 8.3% (Note: Results for PA (6.2%, 5 seats), FA (1.2%, 0 seats) and PSA (0.9%, 0 seats) in the 2004 election.) | 5 | No | |

== Campaign ==
=== Debates ===
2008 Andalusian regional election debates
| Date | Organizer(s) | Moderator(s) | P Present (Note: Denotes a main invitee attending the event.) S Surrogate (Note: Denotes a main invitee not attending the event, sending a surrogate in their place.) NI Not invited I Invited A Absent invitee | | | | | |
| Date | Organizer(s) | Moderator(s) | PSOE–A | PP | IULV–CA | CA | Audience | Ref. |
|---|---|---|---|---|---|---|---|---|
| 26 February | RTVA | Carlos María Ruiz | P Chaves | P Arenas | P Valderas | P Álvarez | 15.7% (518,000) | |
| 2 March | RTVA | Esther Martín | P Chaves | P Arenas | NI | NI | 21.5% (781,000) | |

== Opinion polls ==
The tables below list opinion polling results in reverse chronological order, showing the most recent first and using the dates when the survey fieldwork was done, as opposed to the date of publication. Where the fieldwork dates are unknown, the date of publication is given instead. The highest percentage figure in each polling survey is displayed with its background shaded in the leading party's colour. If a tie ensues, this is applied to the figures with the highest percentages. The "Lead" column on the right shows the percentage-point difference between the parties with the highest percentages in a poll.

=== Graphical summary ===
Local regression trend line of poll results from 14 March 2004 to 9 March 2008, with each line corresponding to a political party.

=== Voting intention estimates ===
The table below lists weighted voting intention estimates. Refusals are generally excluded from the party vote percentages, while question wording and the treatment of "don't know" responses and those not intending to vote may vary between polling organisations. When available, seat projections determined by the polling organisations are displayed below (or in place of) the percentages in a smaller font; 55 seats were required for an absolute majority in the Parliament of Andalusia.

Color key:

Exit poll

| Polling firm/Commissioner | Fieldwork date | Sample size | Turnout | PSOE–A | PP | IULV | PA | Lead |
|---|---|---|---|---|---|---|---|---|
| 2008 regional election | 9 Mar 2008 | —N/a | 74.7 | 48.4; 56 | 38.5; 47 | 7.1; 6 | 2.8; 0 | 9.9 |
| TNS Demoscopia/Antena 3 | 9 Mar 2008 | ? | ? | 47.0; 56/58 | 33.3; 44/46 | 8.6; 4/6 | 7.1; 2/3 | 13.7 |
| Demométrica/Tele 5 | 9 Mar 2008 | ? | ? | ? 55/58 | ? 42/44 | ? 5/6 | ? 3/5 | ? |
| Ipsos/RTVA | 9 Mar 2008 | ? | ? | 52.0; 58/62 | 37.6; 42/45 | ? 4/5 | ? 0 | 14.4 |
| Obradoiro de Socioloxía/Público | 2 Mar 2008 | ? | ? | 48.3; 57/60 | 36.0; 41/45 | ? 8 | ? 2/4 | 12.3 |
| Metroscopia/El País | 1 Mar 2008 | ? | ? | 48.6; 57/59 | 37.2; 41/42 | 8.4; 8 | ? 1/2 | 11.4 |
| IMC/ABC | 28 Jan–1 Mar 2008 | 3,000 | ? | 48.9; 54/58 | 39.0; 43/47 | 6.8; 4/6 | 4.0; 0/3 | 9.9 |
| Sigma Dos/Vocento | 21–26 Feb 2008 | 3,000 | ? | 47.6; 56/58 | 38.5; 44/47 | 7.0; 5/7 | 3.7; 1 | 9.1 |
| IMC/ABC | 28 Jan–24 Feb 2008 | 2,400 | ? | 49.6 | 38.7 | 6.7 | 3.5 | 10.9 |
| Sigma Dos/El Mundo | 18–21 Feb 2008 | 2,000 | ? | 46.8; 55/57 | 38.4; 45/47 | 6.5; 6 | 4.6; 1/2 | 8.4 |
| IMC/ABC | 28 Jan–17 Feb 2008 | 1,800 | ? | 49.4 | 38.9 | 6.5 | 3.0 | 10.5 |
| IMC/ABC | 28 Jan–10 Feb 2008 | 1,200 | ? | 49.7 | 38.6 | 6.1 | 3.2 | 11.1 |
| Nexo/CEPES–A | 31 Jan–7 Feb 2008 | 1,008 | 79 | 46.9; 54/55 | 37.3; 42/43 | 7.3; 8 | 4.5; 4 | 9.6 |
| Opina/Cadena SER | 6 Feb 2008 | 1,600 | ? | 49.0; 56/59 | 35.0; 44/46 | 7.0; 5/6 | 4.0; 1 | 14.0 |
| TNS Demoscopia/Antena 3 | 6 Feb 2008 | ? | ? | 48.5; 57/59 | 36.1; 42/44 | 5.4; 3/4 | 6.3; 5 | 12.4 |
| CIS | 21 Jan–4 Feb 2008 | 3,277 | ? | 49.2; 59 | 36.8; 43 | 6.6; 6 | 4.1; 1 | 12.4 |
| Nexo/CEPES–A | 17–24 Jan 2008 | 1,008 | 71.7 | 45.2; 53/54 | 37.3; 43/44 | 7.3; 8 | 4.2; 4 | 7.9 |
| CA | 8–18 Jan 2008 | 8,500 | 65 | 47.8; 54/56 | ? 40/42 | ? 4/5 | ? 6/8 | ? |
| Idea Asesores/PP | 15 Jan 2008 | 4,000 | ? | 45.6; 53/54 | 39.3; 47/48 | 7.2; 5/6 | 4.5; 2/3 | 6.3 |
| CADPEA/UGR | 10 Dec–12 Jan 2008 | 3,200 | 74.6 | 48.8; 57/59 | 34.2; 41/43 | 6.8; 5/7 | 4.8; 2/4 | 14.6 |
| TNS Demoscopia/Antena 3 | 8–10 Jan 2008 | 750 | ? | 46.3; 56/58 | 37.7; 46/48 | 6.0; 3 | 5.1; 2 | 8.6 |
| Obradoiro de Socioloxía/Público | 9 Jan 2008 | ? | ? | 49.1; 59 | 37.7; 45 | 5.4; 3 | ? 2 | 11.4 |
| IESA/CSIC (Note: "Barómetro de Opinión Pública de Andalucía 2007 (Diciembre, 2007)" (PDF). IESA (in Spanish). 14 December 2007. Archived from the original on 28 June 2018.) | 10 Oct–9 Nov 2007 | 3,700 | 69.8 | 49.1 | 36.7 | 7.3 | 4.9 | 12.4 |
| PA | 5–7 Sep 2007 | 1,600 | 63–65 | 48.3; 55/58 | 36.1; 40/42 | 7.6; 5/6 | 6.4; 5/6 | 12.2 |
| CADPEA/UGR | 11 Jun–9 Jul 2007 | 3,200 | 73.0 | 48.9 | 33.6 | 7.7 | 5.5 | 15.3 |
| Nexo/CEPES–A | 31 Jan–28 Feb 2007 | 1,015 | 70.8 | 45.9; 54/58 | 34.1; 36/38 | 7.2; 6/8 | 6.9; 6/8 | 11.8 |
| Opina/El País | 21–22 Feb 2007 | 1,500 | ? | 48.0; 58/61 | 33.0; 39/40 | 7.5; 6/7 | 5.5; 3/4 | 15.0 |
| Sigma Dos/Vocento | 19–22 Feb 2007 | 1,000 | ? | 47.8; 55/58 | 36.3; 43/48 | 7.2; 5/6 | 5.0; 1/2 | 11.5 |
| Idea Asesores/PP | 19–22 Feb 2007 | 850 | ? | 45.3 | 37.2 | – | – | 8.1 |
| Opina/Cadena SER | 6 Feb 2007 | ? | ? | 50.0 | 33.0 | 8.0 | 6.0 | 17.0 |
| Grupo ESTIO/El Correo | 17 Dec 2006 | ? | ? | 45.1 | 34.5 | 7.3 | 5.8 | 10.6 |
| IESA/CSIC (Note: "Barómetro de Opinión Pública de Andalucía 2006 (Enero, 2007)" (PDF). IESA (in Spanish). 12 January 2007. Archived from the original on 4 March 2016.) | 15 Dec 2006 | 3,706 | 75.3 | 50.6 | 32.8 | 7.9 | 5.3 | 17.8 |
| CADPEA/UGR | 10 Nov–12 Dec 2006 | 3,200 | 76.5 | 49.4 | 31.3 | 8.1 | 4.7 | 18.1 |
| Metroscopia/ABC | 17–19 Oct 2006 | 1,002 | 65 | 47.5 | 36.5 | 7.0 | 5.9 | 11.0 |
| CADPEA/UGR | 20 Jun–16 Jul 2006 | 3,200 | 78 | 49.5 | 34.7 | 7.8 | 4.8 | 14.8 |
| Grupo ESTIO/El Correo | 18–25 May 2006 | 1,009 | ? | 47.5 | 34.5 | 7.5 | 4.2 | 13.0 |
| Metroscopia/ABC | 8–11 May 2006 | 1,001 | 74–75 | 46.8; 56/57 | 38.6; 43/44 | 7.0; 6 | 4.1; 3 | 8.2 |
| Sigma Dos/Vocento | 28 Feb 2006 | ? | ? | 46.0; 54/59 | 39.2; 45/50 | 6.6; 4 | 4.5; 1 | 6.8 |
| Ipsos–Eco/Grupo Joly | 26 Feb 2006 | ? | ? | 48.8; 60/61 | 32.6; 38/39 | 6.8; 5/6 | 7.2; 4/5 | 16.2 |
| Grupo ESTIO/El Correo | 26 Feb 2006 | ? | ? | 48.5 | 34.6 | 6.9 | 5.9 | 13.9 |
| Opina/El País | 13–15 Feb 2006 | 1,500 | ? | 47.0; 56/57 | 33.5; 40/41 | 7.5; 6 | 6.5; 6 | 13.5 |
| Idea Asesores/PP | 23 Jan–10 Feb 2006 | 1,000 | ? | 46.0 | 38.5 | – | – | 7.5 |
| Nexo/CEPES–A | 6–8 Feb 2006 | 1,043 | ? | 45.6; 55/57 | 34.6; 40/42 | 6.5; 6 | 6.6; 6 | 11.0 |
| Metroscopia/ABC | 10–17 Jan 2006 | 802 | 72 | 52.1; 62 | 32.4; 37 | 7.2; 6 | 5.6; 4 | 19.7 |
| CADPEA/UGR | 15 Nov–4 Dec 2005 | 3,200 | 75.8 | 47.5 | 34.5 | 7.5 | 5.4 | 13.0 |
| IESA/CSIC (Note: "Barómetro de Opinión Pública de Andalucía 2005 (Enero, 2006)" (PDF). IESA (in Spanish). 19 January 2006. Archived from the original on 28 January 2015.) | 14 Nov–3 Dec 2005 | 3,710 | 71 | 47.8 | 33.3 | 7.0 | 6.4 | 14.5 |
| Grupo ESTIO/El Correo | 23–30 Nov 2005 | 1,000 | ? | 48.3 | 33.3 | 7.9 | 5.2 | 15.0 |
| Sigma Dos/PP | 14–15 Nov 2005 | 1,000 | ? | 47.8 | 37.3 | 6.3 | 5.1 | 10.5 |
| Metroscopia/ABC (Note: Undecided and/or abstentionists excluded.) | 22–29 Sep 2005 | 802 | 67.8 | 50.6 | 29.8 | 8.7 | 5.0 | 20.8 |
| CADPEA/UGR | 1–22 Jul 2005 | 1,200 | 75 | 48.1 | 35.3 | 7.8 | 5.1 | 12.8 |
| Metroscopia/ABC | 1–6 Jul 2005 | 798 | 71.9 | 49.5 | 32.8 | 5.0 | 6.8 | 16.7 |
| Metroscopia/ABC | 27 Apr–4 May 2005 | 800 | 71.4 | 52.5 | 31.2 | 7.8 | 4.9 | 21.3 |
| Ipsos–Eco/Grupo Joly | 28 Feb 2005 | ? | ? | 50.0; 61 | 29.8; 35/36 | 7.2; 6 | 7.7; 6/7 | 20.2 |
| Opina/El País | 28 Feb 2005 | 1,500 | ? | 51.0; 60 | 32.5; 38 | 7.5; 6 | 6.5; 5 | 18.5 |
| Insight/PP | 26 Feb 2005 | 1,200 | ? | 49.5 | 34.8 | 6.4 | 5.0 | 14.7 |
| Nexo/CEPES–A | 22 Feb 2005 | ? | ? | 51.6 | 30.8 | 6.9 | 5.8 | 20.8 |
| Sigma Dos/Vocento | 15–18 Feb 2005 | 1,000 | ? | 50.0 | 34.2 | 6.8 | 5.3 | 15.8 |
| IESA/CSIC | 15 Jan 2005 | 3,700 | 72 | 50.5 | 32.5 | 8.1 | 6.6 | 18.0 |
| CADPEA/UGR | 24 Nov–20 Dec 2004 | ? | ? | 50.9 | 31.4 | 7.8 | 5.5 | 19.5 |
| IESA/CSIC (Note: "Barómetro de Opinión Pública de Andalucía 2004 (Enero, 2005)" (PDF). IESA (in Spanish). 14 January 2005. Archived from the original on 28 January 2015.) | 15 Nov–3 Dec 2004 | 3,700 | 72 | 49.2 | 33.9 | 8.4 | 6.3 | 15.3 |
| Insight/PP | 20 Nov 2004 | ? | ? | 49.6 | 33.7 | 7.2 | 5.4 | 15.9 |
| Synovate/PSOE | 13–18 Oct 2004 | 1,200 | ? | 54.9 | 32.4 | 6.5 | 5.2 | 22.5 |
| 2004 EP election | 13 Jun 2004 | —N/a | 40.9 | 54.4 (65) | 36.1 (42) | 5.0 (2) | 2.6 (0) | 18.3 |
| 2004 regional election | 14 Mar 2004 | —N/a | 74.7 | 50.4; 61 | 31.8; 37 | 7.5; 6 | 6.2; 5 | 18.6 |

=== Voting preferences ===
The table below lists raw, unweighted voting preferences.

| Polling firm/Commissioner | Fieldwork date | Sample size | PSOE–A | PP | IULV | PA | Question | X mark | Lead |
|---|---|---|---|---|---|---|---|---|---|
| 2008 regional election (Note: Does not include non-resident citizens.) | 9 Mar 2008 | —N/a | 35.3 | 28.3 | 5.2 | 2.0 | —N/a | 26.4 | 7.0 |
| CIS | 21 Jan–4 Feb 2008 | 3,277 | 40.3 | 19.8 | 3.7 | 2.4 | 21.9 | 9.2 | 20.5 |
| CADPEA/UGR | 10 Dec–12 Jan 2008 | 3,200 | 32.3 | 19.3 | 4.0 | 1.6 | 26.3 | 11.7 | 13.0 |
| IESA/CSIC | 10 Oct–9 Nov 2007 | 3,700 | 33.9 | 22.7 | 5.4 | 3.4 | 27.5 | 4.4 | 11.2 |
| CADPEA/UGR | 11 Jun–9 Jul 2007 | 3,200 | 32.1 | 20.9 | 5.9 | 2.4 | 25.7 | 10.6 | 11.2 |
| IESA/CSIC | 15 Dec 2006 | 3,706 | 34.4 | 21.0 | 4.7 | 3.8 | 28.0 | 5.6 | 13.4 |
| CADPEA/UGR | 10 Nov–12 Dec 2006 | 3,200 | 28.3 | 18.3 | 5.3 | 2.8 | 27.6 | 12.5 | 10.0 |
| CADPEA/UGR | 20 Jun–16 Jul 2006 | 3,200 | 32.8 | 17.2 | 4.7 | 3.2 | 28.9 | 9.3 | 15.6 |
| IESA/CSIC | 20 Jan 2006 | ? | 35.9 | 22.2 | 4.7 | 4.0 | 24.6 | 5.1 | 13.7 |
| CADPEA/UGR | 15 Nov–4 Dec 2005 | 3,200 | 29.3 | 20.1 | 4.4 | 2.8 | 27.0 | 12.0 | 9.2 |
| IESA/CSIC | 14 Nov–3 Dec 2005 | 3,710 | 33.8 | 22.5 | 5.2 | 4.7 | – | – | 11.3 |
| CADPEA/UGR | 1–22 Jul 2005 | 1,200 | 32.3 | 20.3 | 4.5 | 2.8 | 30.9 | 5.4 | 12.0 |
| IESA/CSIC | 15 Jan 2005 | 3,700 | 37.1 | 20.5 | 5.7 | 4.8 | 24.8 | 4.9 | 16.6 |
| CADPEA/UGR | 24 Nov–20 Dec 2004 | ? | 37.2 | 22.5 | 5.0 | 4.4 | – | – | 14.7 |
| IESA/CSIC | 15 Nov–3 Dec 2004 | 3,700 | 36.6 | 22.9 | 5.4 | 4.4 | 23.2 | 5.3 | 13.7 |
| 2004 EP election | 13 Jun 2004 | —N/a | 22.4 | 15.0 | 2.1 | 1.1 | —N/a | 58.6 | 7.4 |
| 2004 regional election | 14 Mar 2004 | —N/a | 37.9 | 24.0 | 5.7 | 4.7 | —N/a | 24.2 | 13.9 |

=== Victory preferences ===
The table below lists opinion polling on the victory preferences for each party in the event of a regional election taking place.

| Polling firm/Commissioner | Fieldwork date | Sample size | PSOE–A | PP | IULV | PA | Other/ None | Question | Lead |
|---|---|---|---|---|---|---|---|---|---|
| CIS | 21 Jan–4 Feb 2008 | 3,277 | 44.4 | 22.9 | 4.2 | 2.9 | 2.5 | 23.1 | 21.5 |
| IESA/CSIC | 10 Oct–9 Nov 2007 | 3,700 | 38.8 | 25.9 | 6.5 | 4.5 | 24.3 | | 12.9 |

=== Victory likelihood ===
The table below lists opinion polling on the perceived likelihood of victory for each party in the event of a regional election taking place.

| Polling firm/Commissioner | Fieldwork date | Sample size | PSOE–A | PP | IULV | PA | Other/ None | Question | Lead |
|---|---|---|---|---|---|---|---|---|---|
| CIS | 21 Jan–4 Feb 2008 | 3,277 | 77.4 | 4.6 | – | – | 1.0 | 17.0 | 72.8 |
| IESA/CSIC | 10 Oct–9 Nov 2007 | 3,700 | 61.4 | 10.8 | 0.6 | 0.5 | 26.7 | | 50.6 |
| Grupo ESTIO/El Correo | 18–25 May 2006 | 1,009 | 69.4 | 4.0 | – | – | 26.6 | | 65.4 |

=== Preferred President ===
The table below lists opinion polling on leader preferences to become president of the Regional Government of Andalusia.

| Polling firm/Commissioner | Fieldwork date | Sample size | | | | | Other/ None/ Not care | Question | Lead |
| Polling firm/Commissioner | Fieldwork date | Sample size | Chaves PSOE–A | Arenas PP | Valderas IULV | Álvarez PA | Other/ None/ Not care | Question | Lead |
|---|---|---|---|---|---|---|---|---|---|
| CIS | 21 Jan–4 Feb 2008 | 3,277 | 45.1 | 22.2 | 3.5 | 1.8 | 6.3 | 21.2 | 22.9 |
| Synovate/PSOE | 13–18 Oct 2004 | 1,200 | 54.0 | 33.0 | – | – | 9.0 | 4.0 | 21.0 |

== Voter turnout ==
The table below shows registered voter turnout during the election. Figures for election day do not include non-resident citizens, while final figures do.

| Province | Time (Election day) | | | | | | | | | Final | | |
| Province | 14:00 | | | 18:00 | | | 20:00 | | | Final | | |
| Province | 2004 | 2008 | +/– | 2004 | 2008 | +/– | 2004 | 2008 | +/– | 2004 | 2008 | +/– |
|---|---|---|---|---|---|---|---|---|---|---|---|---|
| Almería | 40.09% | 40.32% | −0.23 | 62.09% | 60.52% | −1.57 | 74.03% | 74.66% | +0.63 | 71.83% | 72.66% | +0.83 |
| Cádiz | 38.34% | 37.19% | −1.15 | 58.93% | 55.85% | −3.08 | 70.79% | 68.12% | −2.67 | 69.82% | 67.31% | −2.51 |
| Córdoba | 43.22% | 39.91% | −3.31 | 65.57% | 60.88% | −4.69 | 79.64% | 76.62% | −3.02 | 78.42% | 75.62% | −2.80 |
| Granada | 42.03% | 39.98% | −2.05 | 64.61% | 61.01% | −3.60 | 77.54% | 75.89% | −1.65 | 75.61% | 74.16% | −1.45 |
| Huelva | 37.20% | 36.24% | −0.96 | 59.01% | 55.62% | −3.39 | 73.82% | 70.40% | −3.42 | 73.07% | 70.51% | −2.56 |
| Jaén | 40.91% | 38.97% | −1.94 | 64.97% | 61.25% | −3.72 | 81.25% | 79.26% | −1.99 | 80.31% | 78.50% | −1.81 |
| Málaga | 41.02% | 39.93% | −1.09 | 61.73% | 59.49% | −2.24 | 72.94% | 72.31% | −0.63 | 71.70% | 71.19% | −0.51 |
| Seville | 42.51% | 36.26% | −6.25 | 65.89% | 60.72% | −5.17 | 77.79% | 74.38% | −3.41 | 77.00% | 73.71% | −3.29 |
| Total | 40.99% | 39.07% | –1.92 | 63.16% | 59.51% | –3.65 | 75.85% | 73.65% | –2.20 | 74.66% | 72.67% | –1.99 |

== Results ==
=== Overall ===
← Summary of the 9 March 2008 Parliament of Andalusia election results →
| Parties and alliances | Popular vote | | | Seats | |
| Parties and alliances | Votes | % | ±pp | Total | +/− |
|---|---|---|---|---|---|
| Spanish Socialist Workers' Party of Andalusia (PSOE–A) | 2,178,296 | 48.41 | −1.95 | 56 | −5 |
| People's Party (PP) | 1,730,154 | 38.45 | +6.67 | 47 | +10 |
| United Left/The Greens–Assembly for Andalusia (IULV–CA) | 317,562 | 7.06 | −0.45 | 6 | ±0 |
| Andalusian Coalition (CA)^{1} | 124,243 | 2.76 | −5.53 | 0 | −5 |
| Union, Progress and Democracy (UPyD) | 27,712 | 0.62 | New | 0 | ±0 |
| The Greens (LV) | 25,886 | 0.58 | New | 0 | ±0 |
| Party of Almería (PdeAL) | 14,806 | 0.33 | New | 0 | ±0 |
| Andalusian Convergence (CAnda) | 7,862 | 0.17 | New | 0 | ±0 |
| Citizens–Party of the Citizenry (C's) | 6,024 | 0.13 | New | 0 | ±0 |
| Republican Left (IR) | 4,815 | 0.11 | +0.04 | 0 | ±0 |
| Humanist Party (PH) | 3,951 | 0.09 | −0.04 | 0 | ±0 |
| Communist Party of the Andalusian People (PCPA) | 2,743 | 0.06 | New | 0 | ±0 |
| Internationalist Solidarity and Self-Management (SAIn) | 2,729 | 0.06 | New | 0 | ±0 |
| Spanish Phalanx of the CNSO (FE de las JONS) | 1,763 | 0.04 | −0.06 | 0 | ±0 |
| Andalusian Social Democratic Party (PSDA) | 1,477 | 0.03 | −0.01 | 0 | ±0 |
| Family and Life Party (PFyV) | 890 | 0.02 | New | 0 | ±0 |
| Christian Positivist Party (PPCr) | 780 | 0.02 | New | 0 | ±0 |
| Blank ballots | 47,920 | 1.06 | −0.33 | | |
| Total | 4,499,613 | | | 109 | ±0 |
| Valid votes | 4,499,613 | 99.37 | +0.02 | | |
| Invalid votes | 28,658 | 0.63 | −0.02 | | |
| Votes cast / turnout | 4,528,271 | 72.67 | −1.99 | | |
| Abstentions | 1,702,816 | 27.33 | +1.99 | | |
| Registered voters | 6,231,087 | | | | |
Sources
Footnotes: ^{1} Andalusian Coalition results are compared to the combined totals of Andalusian Party, Andalusian Forum and Socialist Party of Andalusia in the 2004 election.

Popular vote
| PSOE–A | 48.41% |
| PP | 38.45% |
| IULV–CA | 7.06% |
| CA | 2.76% |
| Others | 2.25% |
| Blank ballots | 1.06% |

Seats
| PSOE–A | 51.38% |
| PP | 43.12% |
| IULV–CA | 5.50% |

=== Distribution by constituency ===
| Constituency | PSOE–A | | PP | | IULV–CA | |
| Constituency | % | S | % | S | % | S |
|---|---|---|---|---|---|---|
| Almería | 39.1 | 5 | 49.3 | 7 | 3.8 | − |
| Cádiz | 47.8 | 8 | 38.3 | 6 | 6.6 | 1 |
| Córdoba | 46.6 | 6 | 37.9 | 5 | 9.5 | 1 |
| Granada | 46.1 | 6 | 42.0 | 6 | 7.3 | 1 |
| Huelva | 52.0 | 6 | 35.2 | 4 | 7.6 | 1 |
| Jaén | 53.3 | 7 | 36.6 | 5 | 6.1 | − |
| Málaga | 43.2 | 7 | 43.6 | 8 | 7.1 | 1 |
| Seville | 54.4 | 11 | 31.7 | 6 | 7.3 | 1 |
| Total | 48.4 | 56 | 38.5 | 47 | 7.1 | 6 |

== Aftermath ==
=== Government formation ===
Investiture; Nomination of Manuel Chaves (PSOE–A)
| Ballot → | 17 April 2008 |
| Required majority → | 55 out of 109 |
| Yes: • PSOE–A (56) | 56 / 109 |
| No: • PP (46); • IULV–CA (6) | 52 / 109 |
| Abstentions | 0 / 109 |
| Absentees: • PP (1) | 1 / 109 |

=== 2009 investiture ===
On 7 April 2009, Manuel Chaves resigned as regional President in order to become Third Deputy Prime Minister in the Second Zapatero Government, being succeeded as acting officeholder by Vice President Gaspar Zarrías. On 22 April, José Antonio Griñán was elected as new President by the Parliament of Andalusia.

Investiture; Nomination of José Antonio Griñán (PSOE–A)
| Ballot → | 22 April 2009 |
| Required majority → | 55 out of 109 |
| Yes: • PSOE–A (56) | 56 / 109 |
| No: • PP (47); • IULV–CA (6) | 53 / 109 |
| Abstentions | 0 / 109 |
| Absentees | 0 / 109 |

== Bibliography ==
- Ley Orgánica 5/1985, de 19 de junio, del Régimen Electoral General (Organic Law 5/1985). Official State Gazette (in Spanish). 19 June 1985 [version as of 2 November 2007]. BOE-A-1985-11672.
- Ley 1/1986, de 2 de enero, Electoral de Andalucía (Law 1/1986). Official State Gazette (in Spanish). 2 January 1986 [version as of 18 April 2005]. BOE-A-1986-2788.
- Ley 6/2006, de 24 de octubre, del Gobierno de la Comunidad Autónoma de Andalucía (Law 6/2006). Official State Gazette (in Spanish). 24 October 2006 [version as of 7 November 2006]. BOE-A-2006-20848.
- Ley Orgánica 2/2007, de 19 de marzo, de reforma del Estatuto de Autonomía para Andalucía (Organic Law 2/2007). Official State Gazette (in Spanish). 19 March 2007 [version as of 20 March 2007]. BOE-A-2007-5825.
- Decreto del Presidente 1/2008, de 14 de enero, de disolución del Parlamento de Andalucía y de convocatoria de elecciones (PDF) (Decree 1/2008). Official Gazette of the Regional Government of Andalusia (in Spanish). 14 January 2008.
