= Diego Valderas =

Spanish politician (born 1953)

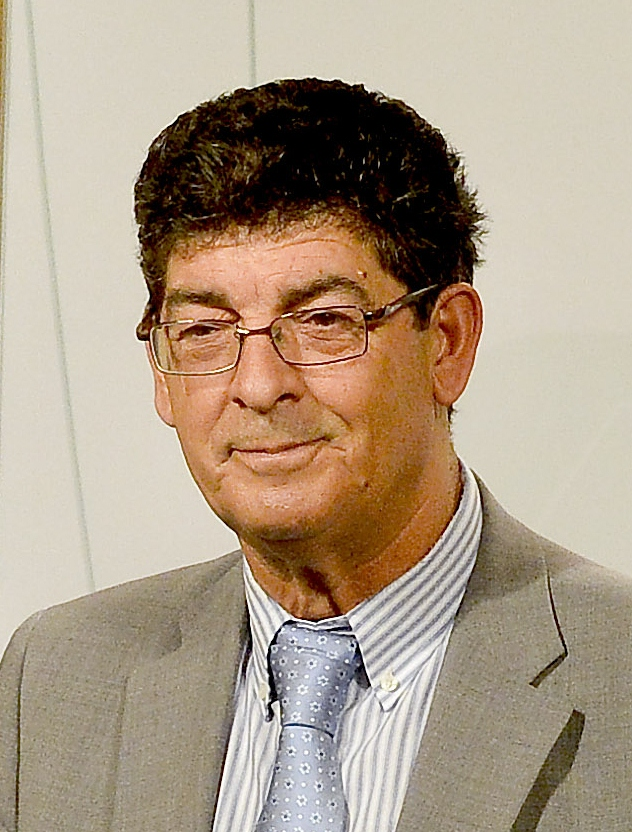

Diego Valderas Sosa (born 25 January 1953) is a Spanish politician of the United Left (IU). He was the first democratically elected mayor of his hometown of Bollullos Par del Condado in the Province of Huelva (1979–1994) and a member of the Parliament of Andalusia (1986–2000; 2008–2015). He was the general coordinator of the United Left/The Greens–Assembly for Andalusia (IULV–CA) from 2000 to 2013, the President of the Parliament of Andalusia (1994–1996) and the Vice President of the Regional Government of Andalusia (2012–2015).

== Biography ==
Born in Bollullos Par del Condado, Province of Huelva Valderas worked as a butane deliveryman in his hometown. He was the town's first democratically elected mayor in the 1979 local elections; representing the Communist Party of Spain (PCE), he served three terms with absolute majorities until 1994. He was also the party spokesman in the provincial deputation and was first elected to the Parliament of Andalusia in 1986. From 1994 to 1996, he was President of the Parliament (speaker) as his group and the People's Party (PP) aligned in the so-called Pinza to thwart the government of Spanish Socialist Workers' Party (PSOE) regional president Manuel Chaves. In 1994, he made news internationally for suspending a parliamentary session on the budget due to fits of laughter.

Partly due to its obstruction of the regional budget, the IULV-CA vote share declined in 2000, following which Valderas lost his seat but became the group's new general coordinator. He ran for regional president in 2004, but was unable to even recover his seat in the Huelva constituency. He returned to parliament after the 2008 election.

In the 2012 election, the PSOE of president José Antonio Griñán declined while the IULV-CA rose from six seats to twelve. The two parties formed a coalition government, with Griñán as president and Valderas as vice president and Minister of Local Administration and Institutional Relations. He became the first member of his party to hold the office. He retained his positions in the new government when Susana Díaz took the Socialist leadership in 2013, while Antonio Maíllo succeeded him as party leader.

In January 2015, after the PSOE and IULV-CA announced that they would no longer work together following March's elections, Valderas said that he would not stand in the election though he was not retiring. At 62, he decided to spend more time with his family and let the younger generation advance in politics.
