= Association of Andalusian Public Universities =

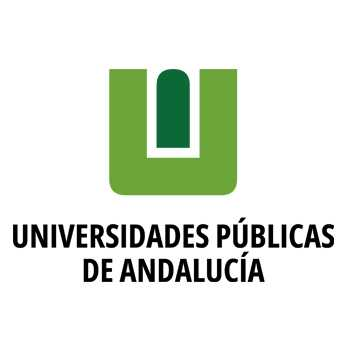
- Abbreviation: AUPA
- Formation: 2006
- Type: NGO
- Legal status: Association
- Purpose: Educational
- Headquarters: Cádiz, Spain
- Members: Spanish Universities
- Official language: Spanish

The Association of Andalusian Public Universities (AUPA) is a non-profit organization that brings together the 10 public universities of Andalusia . It was created in May 2006 as a representative of the Andalusian public university system, to defend the interests of all the universities within the association, represented by their respective rectors.

== History ==
The Association of Andalusian Public Universities (AUPA) was founded on May 9, 2006 in Cádiz. At the national level, it is part of the Conference of Rectors of Spanish Universities (CRUE).

AUPA also participates in the General Negotiation Table of the Public Universities of Andalusia, the regional forum for social dialogue that brings together public universities, trade unions and the Andalusian Government.

== Objectives ==
Among AUPA's main objectives are:

To promote and develop higher education in Andalusia by fostering cooperation with national and foreign universities, as well as with public administrations, in order to strengthen the social projection of the University and its commitment to shaping a knowledge society without borders.

== Members ==
Currently, the members of AUPA are:

- José Joaquín Céspedes, Rector of the University of Almería
- Casimiro Mantell, Rector of the University of Cádiz
- Manuel Torralbo, Rector of the University of Córdoba
- Pedro Mercado, Rector of the University of Granada
- José Rodríguez Quintero, Rector of the University of Huelva
- José Ignacio García, Rector of the International University of Andalusia
- Nicolás Ruíz, Rector of the University of Jaén
- Juan Teodomiro López, Rector of the University of Malaga
- Francisco Oliva, Rector of the Pablo de Olavide University
- Carmen Vargas , Rector of the University of Seville

== Presidents ==
The presidents of the association throughout history have been:

AUPA Presidents
Term	University	Rector
2006 - 2008	UGR	David Ruiz Aguilar
2008 - 2011	UMA	Adelaida de la Calle Martín
2011 - 2014	UCO	José Manuel Roldán Nogueras
2014 - 2018	UCA	Eduardo González Mazo
2018 - 2022	UJA	Juan Gómez Ortega
2022 - 2023	UAL	Carmelo Rodríguez Torreblanca
2023 - present	UPO	Francisco Oliva Blázquez
