= 2004 Andalusian regional election =

Election in the Spanish region of Andalusia

- 14 March 2004

All 109 seats in the Parliament of Andalusia 55 seats needed for a majority
- Opinion polls
- Registered: 6,052,012 ▲2.3%
- Turnout: 4,518,545 (74.7%) ▲6.0 pp
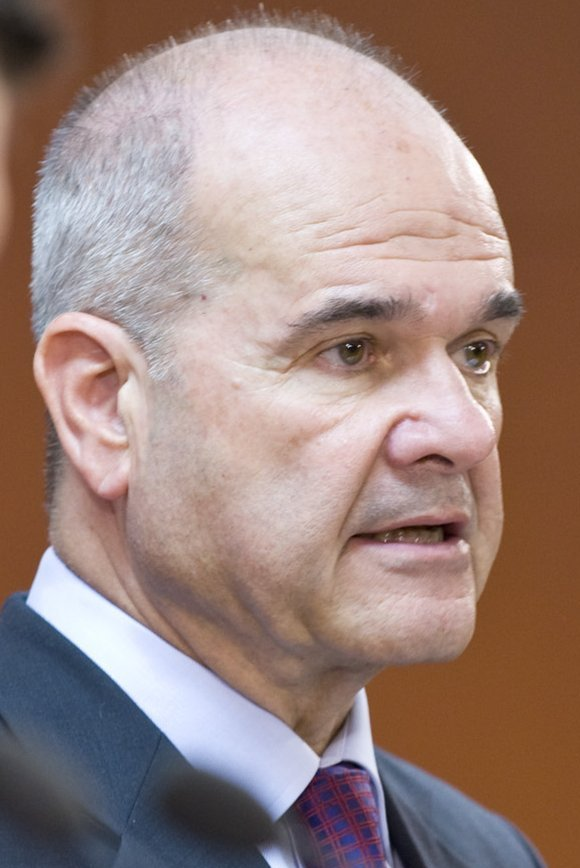

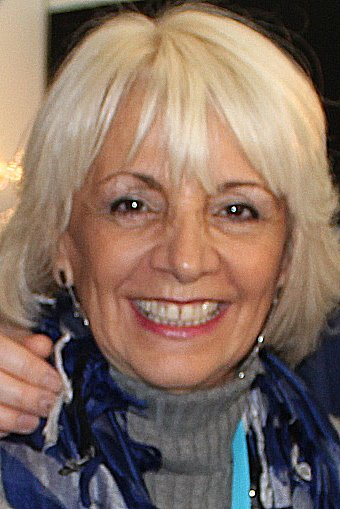

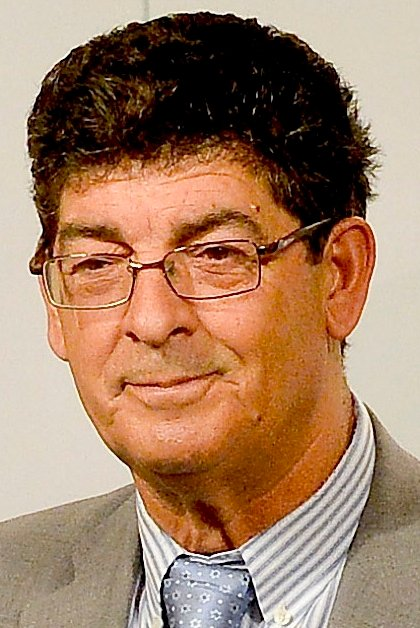

	First party	Second party	Third party
Leader	Manuel Chaves	Teófila Martínez	Diego Valderas
Party	PSOE–A	PP	IULV–CA
Leader since	19 April 1990	20 February 1999	15 October 2000
Leader's seat	Cádiz	Cádiz	Huelva
Last election	52 seats, 44.3%	46 seats, 38.0%	6 seats, 8.1%
Seats won	61	37	6
Seat change	▲9	▼9	0
Popular vote	2,260,545	1,426,774	337,030
Percentage	50.4%	31.8%	7.5%
Swing	▲6.1 pp	▼6.2 pp	▼0.6 pp
	Fourth party
Leader	Antonio Ortega
Party	PA
Leader since	24 March 2001
Leader's seat	Seville
Last election	5 seats, 7.4%
Seats won	5
Seat change	0
Popular vote	276,674
Percentage	6.2%
Swing	▼1.2 pp
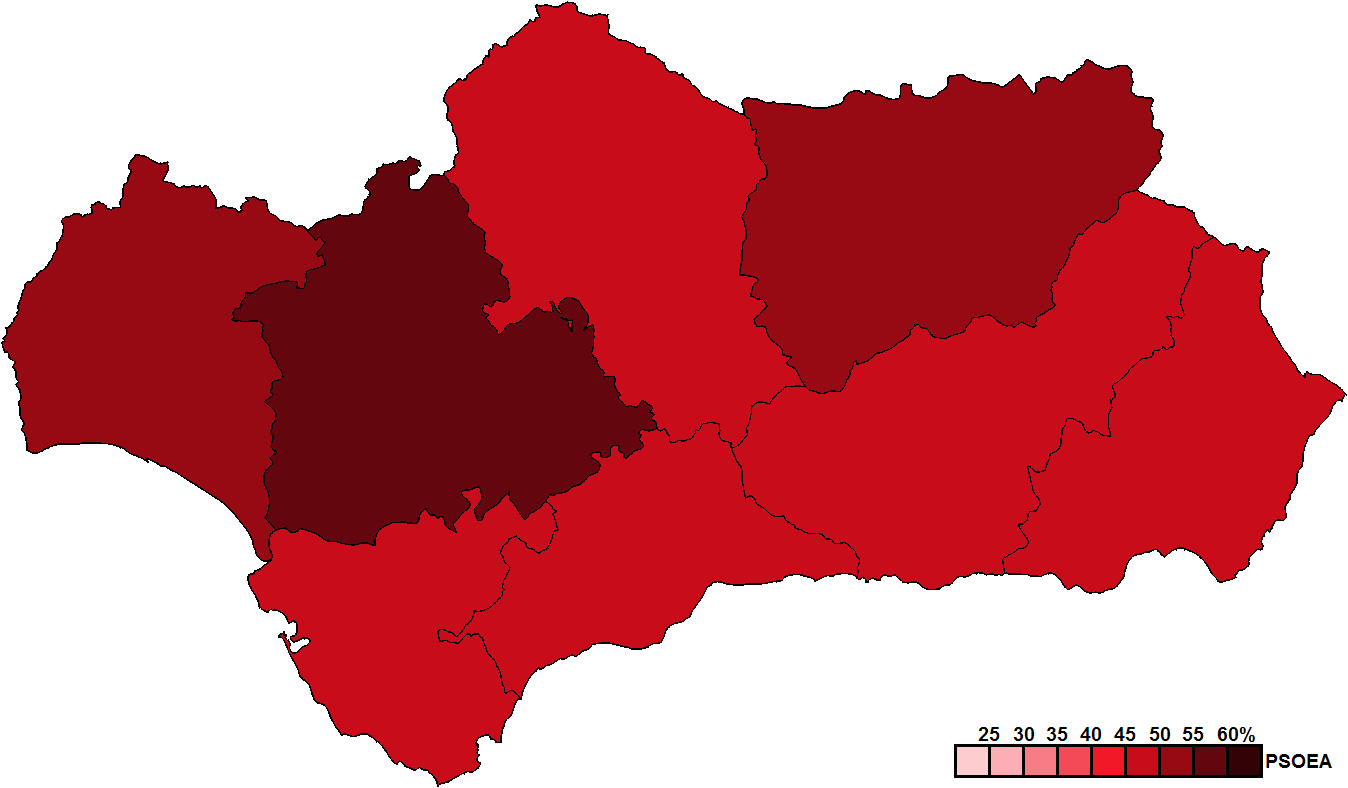
- Constituency results map for the Parliament of Andalusia
President before election
Manuel Chaves
PSOE–A
President after election
Manuel Chaves
PSOE–A

A regional election was held in Andalusia on 14 March 2004 to elect the 7th Parliament of the autonomous community. All 109 seats in the Parliament were up for election. It was held concurrently with the 2004 Spanish general election.

As happened with the concurrent nationwide election, results in Andalusia were heavily influenced by political controversy derived from the 11 March train bombings in Madrid. The ruling Spanish Socialist Workers' Party of Andalusia (PSOE–A) exceeded all opinion poll expectations by securing a comfortable majority. Incumbent Manuel Chaves was thus able to be re-elected for a fifth consecutive term as President of the Regional Government of Andalusia.

== Overview ==
Under the 1981 Statute of Autonomy, the Parliament of Andalusia was the unicameral legislature of the homonymous autonomous community, having legislative power in devolved matters, as well as the ability to grant or withdraw confidence from a regional president. The electoral and procedural rules were supplemented by national law provisions.

=== Date ===
The term of the Parliament of Andalusia expired four years after the date of its previous election, unless it was dissolved earlier. The election decree was required to be issued no later than 25 days before the scheduled expiration date of parliament and published on the following day in the Official Gazette of the Regional Government of Andalusia (BOJA), with election day taking place 54 days after the decree's publication (barring any date within from 1 July to 31 August). The previous election was held on 12 March 2000, which meant that the chamber's term would have expired on 12 March 2004. The election decree was required to be published in the BOJA no later than 17 February 2004, setting the latest possible date for election day on 11 April 2004.

The regional president had the prerogative to dissolve the Parliament of Andalusia at any given time and call a snap election, provided that no motion of no confidence was in process and that dissolution did not occur before one year after a previous one.

The Parliament of Andalusia was officially dissolved on 20 January 2004 with the publication of the corresponding decree in the BOJA, setting election day for 14 March and scheduling for the chamber to reconvene on 31 March.

=== Electoral system ===
Voting for the Parliament was based on universal suffrage, comprising all Spanish nationals over 18 years of age, registered in Andalusia and with full political rights, provided that they had not been deprived of the right to vote by a final sentence, nor were legally incapacitated.

The Parliament of Andalusia had a minimum of 90 and a maximum of 110 seats, with electoral provisions fixing its size at 109. All were elected in eight multi-member constituencies—corresponding to the provinces of Almería, Cádiz, Córdoba, Granada, Huelva, Jaén, Málaga and Seville, each of which was assigned an initial minimum of eight seats and the remaining 45 distributed in proportion to population (with the number of seats in each province not exceeding two times that of any other)—using the D'Hondt method and closed-list proportional voting, with a three percent-threshold of valid votes (including blank ballots) in each constituency. The use of this electoral method resulted in a higher effective threshold depending on district magnitude and vote distribution.

As a result of the aforementioned allocation, each Parliament constituency was entitled the following seats:

Seats	Constituencies
18	Seville
16	Málaga
15	Cádiz
13	Córdoba, Granada
12	Jaén
11	Almería, Huelva

The law did not provide for by-elections to fill vacant seats; instead, any vacancies arising after the proclamation of candidates and during the legislative term were filled by the next candidates on the party lists or, when required, by designated substitutes.

=== Outgoing parliament ===
The table below shows the composition of the parliamentary groups in the chamber at the time of dissolution.

Parliamentary composition in January 2004
Groups	Parties	Legislators	
Groups	Parties	Seats	Total
Socialist Parliamentary Group	PSOE–A	52	52
Andalusian People's Parliamentary Group	PP	46	46
United Left/The Greens Parliamentary Group	IULV–CA	6	6
Andalusian Parliamentary Group	PA	3	3
Mixed Group	PSA	2 (Note: Ricardo Chamorro and Pedro Pacheco, former PA legislators.)	2

== Parties and candidates ==
The electoral law allowed for parties and federations registered in the interior ministry, alliances and groupings of electors to present lists of candidates. Parties and federations intending to form an alliance were required to inform the relevant electoral commission within 10 days of the election call, whereas groupings of electors needed to secure the signature of at least one percent of the electorate in the constituencies for which they sought election, disallowing electors from signing for more than one list.

Below is a list of the main parties and alliances which contested the election:

Candidacy	Parties and alliances	Leading candidate	Ideology	Previous result		Gov.	Ref.
Candidacy	Parties and alliances	Leading candidate	Ideology	Vote %	Seats	Gov.	Ref.
PSOE–A	List: Spanish Socialist Workers' Party of Andalusia (PSOE–A)	Manuel Chaves	Social democracy	44.3%	52	Yes	
PP	List: People's Party (PP)	Teófila Martínez	Conservatism; Christian democracy	38.0%	46	No	
IULV–CA	List: United Left/The Greens–Assembly for Andalusia (IULV–CA) – Communist Party of Andalusia (PCA) – Collective for the Unity of Workers–Andalusian Left Bloc (CUT–BAI) – Revolutionary Workers' Party (POR) – Workers' Revolutionary Party–Revolutionary Left (PRT–IR)	Diego Valderas	Socialism; Communism	8.1%	6	No	
PA	List: Andalusian Party (PA)	Antonio Ortega	Andalusian nationalism Social democracy	7.4%	5	Yes	
PSA	List: Socialist Party of Andalusia (PSA)	Pedro Pacheco	Andalusian nationalism Social democracy	Did not contest		No	

Former Labour minister in the first government of José María Aznar, Manuel Pimentel, abandoned the People's Party (PP) in March 2003 in protest over the Irak War crisis, forming his own party (Andalusian Forum) to contest the regional election.

== Campaign ==
=== Debates ===
2004 Andalusian regional election debates
Date	Organizer(s)	Moderator(s)	P Present (Note: Denotes a main invitee attending the event.) S Surrogate (Note: Denotes a main invitee not attending the event, sending a surrogate in their place.) NI Not invited I Invited A Absent invitee					
Date	Organizer(s)	Moderator(s)	PSOE–A	PP	IULV–CA	PA	Audience	Ref.
4 March	RTVA	Manuel Campo Vidal	P Chaves	P Martínez	P Valderas	P Ortega	17.9% (552,000)	

== Opinion polls ==
The tables below list opinion polling results in reverse chronological order, showing the most recent first and using the dates when the survey fieldwork was done, as opposed to the date of publication. Where the fieldwork dates are unknown, the date of publication is given instead. The highest percentage figure in each polling survey is displayed with its background shaded in the leading party's colour. If a tie ensues, this is applied to the figures with the highest percentages. The "Lead" column on the right shows the percentage-point difference between the parties with the highest percentages in a poll.

=== Graphical summary ===
Local regression trend line of poll results from 12 March 2000 to 14 March 2004, with each line corresponding to a political party.

=== Voting intention estimates ===
The table below lists weighted voting intention estimates. Refusals are generally excluded from the party vote percentages, while question wording and the treatment of "don't know" responses and those not intending to vote may vary between polling organisations. When available, seat projections determined by the polling organisations are displayed below (or in place of) the percentages in a smaller font; 55 seats were required for an absolute majority in the Parliament of Andalusia.

Color key:

Exit poll

Polling firm/Commissioner	Fieldwork date	Sample size	Turnout	PSOE–A	PP	IULV	PA	PSA	Lead
2004 regional election	14 Mar 2004	—N/a	74.7	50.4; 61	31.8; 37	7.5; 6	6.2; 5	0.9; 0	18.6
Sigma Dos/Antena 3	14 Mar 2004	?	?	48.2; 56/59	34.4; 40/43	7.1; 4/7	6.5; 5	–	13.8
Ipsos–Eco/RTVE (Note: "Elecciones Generales y de la Comunidad Autónoma de Andalucía. Sondeo de Ipsos-EcoConsulting para RTVE - Domingo 14 de Marzo". RTVE (in Spanish). 14 March 2004. Archived from the original on 26 March 2004.)	14 Mar 2004	?	?	47.5; 57/59	32.8; 37/40	8.8; 7/8	6.6; 4/5	–	14.7
Metra Seis/PA	27 Feb–3 Mar 2004	?	?	? 53/54	? 44	? 4	? 7/8	? 0	?
Vox Pública/Diario Córdoba	29 Feb 2004	?	?	44.0; 54/55	37.5; 46/47	7.2; 4/5	5.7; 2/3	–	6.5
Opina/El País	26–27 Feb 2004	1,500	?	47.0; 56/59	36.5; 42/46	7.0; 4/6	6.0; 3	–	10.5
TNS Demoscopia/Vocento	12–20 Feb 2004	3,613	67–68	47.1; 54/56	36.7; 46/47	6.9; 4/5	7.3; 3	–	10.4
CIS	24 Jan–15 Feb 2004	4,147	75.2	47.1; 55	36.1; 42	8.1; 8	6.8; 4	0.2; 0	11.0
Idea Asesores/PP	14 Feb 2004	?	?	42.0; 50/51	39.8; 49/51	? 5/6	? 3	? 0	2.2
Opina/CEA	2–7 Feb 2004	3,200	?	45.5; 53/54	37.5; 45/46	7.5; 7	6.0; 3	0.5; 0	8.0
Sigma Dos/El Mundo	2–5 Feb 2004	2,500	?	44.9; 54/55	37.7; 47/48	7.4; 4/5	5.6; 2/3	–	7.2
CADPEA/UGR	3–23 Dec 2003	3,200	72.6	45.2	37.1	7.8	6.7	0.8	8.1
Metra Seis/PA	24 Nov 2003	?	?	? 53/54	? 44/45	? 5/6	? 4/6	? 0	?
IESA/CSIC	1–21 Nov 2003	3,700	70	46.7	37.2	8.0	7.4	0.3	9.5
Idea Asesores/PP	22 Sep–2 Oct 2003	3,000	?	42.8; 50/51	39.5; 49/50	8.5; 6	5.5; 2/3	0.6; 0	3.3
CADPEA/UGR	1–19 Jul 2003	3,200	74.2	45.1	37.3	8.2	6.6	0.8	7.8
Demoscopia/Grupo Joly	28 Feb 2003	?	?	47.9	34.7	7.7	8.2	–	13.2
Opina/El País	18–19 Feb 2003	1,200	?	50.5	30.0	9.5	7.5	–	20.5
Sigma Dos/ABC	14–17 Feb 2003	1,000	?	49.8	33.7	7.5	6.1	–	16.1
Idea Asesores/PP	3–12 Feb 2003	2,500	?	43.2; 51/52	39.8; 48/49	6.9; 5	6.6; 4	1.1; 0/1	3.4
CADPEA/UGR	31 Jan 2003	3,500	?	46.9	34.9	7.7	7.8	0.4	12.0
IESA/CSIC	15 Nov–10 Dec 2002	3,884	70	47.9	35.2	7.5	7.1	0.5	12.7
Inner/PSOE	10 Nov 2002	431	?	51.6	39.1	7.6	1.7	–	12.5
CIS	9 Sep–9 Oct 2002	982	70.9	45.0	37.2	7.1	8.2	–	7.8
Sigma Dos/Sur	28 Feb 2002	?	?	45.0	40.7	6.8	5.0	–	4.3
Idea Asesores/PP	28 Feb 2002	?	?	41.9; 50	40.6; 49/50	7.4; 4/5	5.7; 3/4	2.6; 0	1.3
Opina/El País	18–19 Feb 2002	1,200	?	47.3	35.0	7.3	7.8	0.5	12.3
PSOE	31 Jan–5 Feb 2002	1,200	?	45.7	35.5	8.6	7.9	–	10.2
IESA/CSIC	15 Nov–10 Dec 2001	3,696	?	46.8	35.8	8.9	7.1	–	11.0
Opina/CEA	15–27 Oct 2001	3,200	?	44.2; 52/53	39.5; 47/48	7.4; 5/6	6.9; 3/4	–	4.7
PSOE	7–15 Jun 2001	2,045	?	50.9	34.1	–	–	–	16.8
Sigma Dos	28 Feb 2001	?	?	43.2	40.3	7.1	7.4	–	2.9
IESA/CSIC	10 Nov–5 Dec 2000	3,645	?	46.6	35.7	9.4	7.8	–	10.9
2000 regional election	12 Mar 2000	—N/a	68.7	44.3; 52	38.0; 46	8.1; 6	7.4; 5	–	6.3

=== Voting preferences ===
The table below lists raw, unweighted voting preferences.

Polling firm/Commissioner	Fieldwork date	Sample size	PSOE–A	PP	IULV	PA	PSA	Question	X mark	Lead
2004 regional election (Note: Does not include non-resident citizens.)	14 Mar 2004	—N/a	37.9	24.0	5.7	4.7	0.7	—N/a	24.2	13.9
CIS	24 Jan–15 Feb 2004	4,147	37.8	17.6	5.1	3.2	0.1	28.6	5.9	20.2
CADPEA/UGR	3–23 Dec 2003	3,200	36.6	18.8	–	–	–	32.3	–	17.8
IESA/CSIC	1–21 Nov 2003	3,700	32.3	24.9	6.0	5.2	–	22.8	6.5	7.4
Idea Asesores/PP	3–12 Feb 2003	2,500	25.3	22.3	4.1	4.9	0.3	35.0	8.1	3.0
IESA/CSIC	15 Nov–10 Dec 2002	3,884	35.3	22.2	5.1	4.9	–	23.9	5.3	13.1
CIS	9 Sep–9 Oct 2002	982	29.3	15.4	4.5	5.0	–	34.3	9.1	13.9
IESA/CSIC	15 Nov–10 Dec 2001	3,696	32.2	23.7	6.3	4.9	–	24.9	5.1	8.5
Opina/CEA	15–27 Oct 2001	3,200	28.2	21.0	4.2	5.2	–	–	–	7.2
Demoscopia/El País	15–20 Feb 2001	1,205	23.7	22.7	3.2	6.0	–	–	–	1.0
IESA/CSIC	10 Nov–5 Dec 2000	3,645	31.8	23.4	6.3	5.2	–	26.0	5.2	8.4
2000 regional election	12 Mar 2000	—N/a	30.6	26.4	5.6	5.2	–	—N/a	30.2	4.2

=== Victory preferences ===
The table below lists opinion polling on the victory preferences for each party in the event of a regional election taking place.

Polling firm/Commissioner	Fieldwork date	Sample size	PSOE–A	PP	IULV	PA	PSA	Other/ None	Question	Lead
Opina/El País	26–27 Feb 2004	1,500	39.2	23.5	4.3	3.6	0.3	1.4	37.7	15.7
CIS	24 Jan–15 Feb 2004	4,147	44.4	20.4	5.5	3.5	0.2	1.2	24.8	24.0
Opina/El País	18–19 Feb 2003	1,200	35.8	19.0	4.2	4.8	0.2	0.8	35.2	16.8
Opina/El País	18–19 Feb 2002	1,200	34.5	21.3	4.3	3.4	0.3	0.6	35.7	13.2

=== Victory likelihood ===
The table below lists opinion polling on the perceived likelihood of victory for each party in the event of a regional election taking place.

Polling firm/Commissioner	Fieldwork date	Sample size	PSOE–A	PP	IULV	PA	PSA	Other/ None	Question	Lead
Opina/El País	26–27 Feb 2004	1,500	73.6	7.5	0.1	0.2	0.0	0.1	18.6	66.1
CIS	24 Jan–15 Feb 2004	4,147	72.9	5.4	0.3	0.3	–	0.1	21.0	67.5
Inner/PSOE	20 Oct–7 Nov 2003	1,200	65.1	14.6	–	–	–	1.8	18.5	50.5
Opina/El País	18–19 Feb 2003	1,200	63.6	5.4	0.3	0.8	0.1	0.1	29.7	58.2
Opina/El País	18–19 Feb 2002	1,200	53.5	11.8	0.4	0.6	0.4	0.0	33.2	41.7

=== Preferred President ===
The table below lists opinion polling on leader preferences to become president of the Regional Government of Andalusia.

Polling firm/Commissioner	Fieldwork date	Sample size						Other/ None/ Not care	Question	Lead
Polling firm/Commissioner	Fieldwork date	Sample size	Chaves PSOE–A	Martínez PP	Valderas IULV	Ortega PA	Pacheco PSA	Other/ None/ Not care	Question	Lead
Vox Pública/Diario Córdoba	29 Feb 2004	?	45.8	22.1	–	–	–	–	–	23.7
Opina/El País	26–27 Feb 2004	1,500	38.0	22.5	3.2	3.2	–	2.2	30.9	15.5
CIS	24 Jan–15 Feb 2004	4,147	46.7	19.1	3.3	2.0	2.2	4.1	22.7	27.6
Inner/PSOE	20 Oct–7 Nov 2003	1,200	55.9	32.7	–	–	–	7.9	3.5	23.2

== Results ==
=== Overall ===
← Summary of the 14 March 2004 Parliament of Andalusia election results →
Parties and alliances	Popular vote			Seats	
Parties and alliances	Votes	%	±pp	Total	+/−
Spanish Socialist Workers' Party of Andalusia (PSOE–A)	2,260,545	50.36	+6.04	61	+9
People's Party (PP)	1,426,774	31.78	−6.24	37	−9
United Left/The Greens–Assembly for Andalusia (IULV–CA)	337,030	7.51	−0.60	6	±0
Andalusian Party (PA)	276,674	6.16	−1.27	5	±0
Andalusian Forum (FA)	53,288	1.19	New	0	±0
Socialist Party of Andalusia (PSA)	42,219	0.94	New	0	±0
Humanist Party (PH)	5,670	0.13	+0.02	0	±0
New Andalusian Green Left (NIVA)	5,065	0.11	New	0	±0
Andalusia Assembly (A)	4,544	0.10	−0.01	0	±0
Spanish Phalanx of the CNSO (FE de las JONS)^{1}	4,437	0.10	+0.07	0	±0
Party of Precarious Workers (PTPRE)	3,321	0.07	New	0	±0
Republican Left (IR)	3,130	0.07	New	0	±0
Andalusian Social Democratic Party (PSDA)	1,642	0.04	New	0	±0
Left Assembly–Initiative for Andalusia (A–IZ)	1,334	0.03	New	0	±0
Another Democracy is Possible (ODeP)	525	0.01	New	0	±0
National Union (UN)	523	0.01	±0.00	0	±0
Blank ballots	62,451	1.39	+0.10		
Total	4,489,172			109	±0
Valid votes	4,489,172	99.35	+0.01		
Invalid votes	28,658	0.65	−0.01		
Votes cast / turnout	4,518,545	74.66	+5.95		
Abstentions	1,533,467	25.34	−5.95		
Registered voters	6,052,012				
Sources
Footnotes: ^{1} Spanish Phalanx of the CNSO results are compared to Independent Spanish Phalanx totals in the 2000 election.

Popular vote
PSOE–A	50.36%
PP	31.78%
IULV–CA	7.51%
PA	6.16%
FA	1.19%
Others	1.61%
Blank ballots	1.39%

Seats
PSOE–A	55.96%
PP	33.94%
IULV–CA	5.50%
PA	4.59%

=== Distribution by constituency ===
Constituency	PSOE–A		PP		IULV–CA		PA	
Constituency	%	S	%	S	%	S	%	S
Almería	46.1	6	42.0	5	3.8	−	4.4	−
Cádiz	47.8	8	32.0	5	6.6	1	7.3	1
Córdoba	45.9	7	30.8	4	11.2	1	6.4	1
Granada	49.0	7	35.4	5	7.1	1	4.3	−
Huelva	52.9	7	28.8	3	7.3	−	8.0	1
Jaén	53.1	7	32.4	4	6.7	1	5.7	−
Málaga	47.5	8	34.6	6	7.6	1	6.7	1
Seville	55.9	11	26.2	5	7.9	1	6.1	1
Total	50.4	61	31.8	37	7.5	6	6.2	5

== Aftermath ==
=== Government formation ===
Investiture; Nomination of Manuel Chaves (PSOE–A)
Ballot →	21 April 2004
Required majority →	55 out of 109
Yes: • PSOE–A (61)	61 / 109
No: • PP (36)	36 / 109
Abstentions: • IULV–CA (6); • PA (5)	11 / 109
Absentees: • PP (1)	1 / 109

== Bibliography ==
- Ley Orgánica 6/1981, de 30 de diciembre, de Estatuto de Autonomía para Andalucía (Organic Law 6/1981). Official State Gazette (in Spanish). 30 December 1981. BOE-A-1982-633.
- Ley 6/1983, de 21 de julio, del Gobierno y la Administración de la Comunidad Autónoma (Law 6/1983). Official State Gazette (in Spanish). 21 July 1983. BOE-A-1983-23960.
- Ley Orgánica 5/1985, de 19 de junio, del Régimen Electoral General (Organic Law 5/1985). Official State Gazette (in Spanish). 19 June 1985 [version as of 29 November 2003]. BOE-A-1985-11672.
- Ley 1/1986, de 2 de enero, Electoral de Andalucía (Law 1/1986). Official State Gazette (in Spanish). 2 January 1986 [version as of 31 December 2003]. BOE-A-1986-2788.
- Ley 6/1994, de 18 de mayo, de Modificación de la Ley 6/1983, de 21 de julio, del Gobierno y la Administración de la Comunidad Autónoma, y la Ley 1/1986, de 2 de enero, Electoral de Andalucía (Law 6/1994). Official State Gazette (in Spanish). 18 May 1994. BOE-A-1994-14602.
- Decreto del Presidente 1/2004, de 19 de enero, de disolución del Parlamento de Andalucía y de convocatoria de elecciones (PDF) (Decree 1/2004). Official Gazette of the Regional Government of Andalusia (in Spanish). 19 January 2004.
