= Spanish Socialist Workers' Party of Andalusia =

Spanish Socialist Workers' Party of Andalusia Partido Socialista Obrero Español de Andalucía
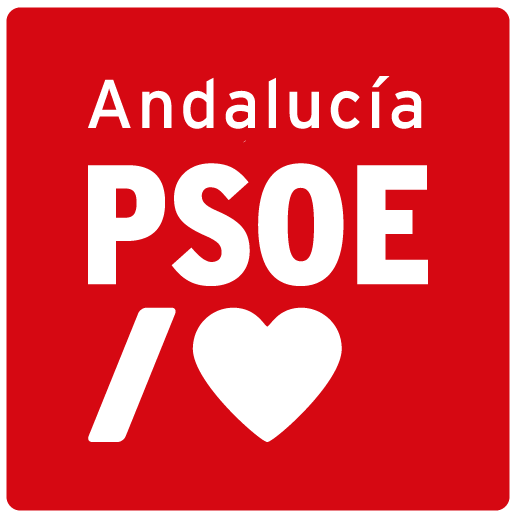
- President: Fuensanta Coves
- Secretary-General: María Jesús Montero
- Spokesperson: Ángeles Férriz
- Founded: 1977
- Headquarters: C/ San Vicente, 37; 41002 Seville, Andalusia
- Youth wing: Socialist Youth of Andalusia
- Membership: ▼45,124
- Ideology: Social democracy
- Political position: Centre-left
- National affiliation: Spanish Socialist Workers' Party
- Colors: Red; Green
- Parliament of Andalusia: 28 / 109
- Congress of Deputies: 21 / 61
- Senate: 14 / 41
- Local Government: 3,780 / 9,031
- Provincial deputations: 93 / 228

Website
- www.psoeandalucia.com

The Spanish Socialist Workers' Party of Andalusia (Spanish: Partido Socialista Obrero Español de Andalucía, PSOE–A) is the Andalusian branch of the Spanish Socialist Workers' Party, as well as the largest and one of the most important federations within the PSOE.

Formerly known as the Andalusian Socialist Federation (FSA), it was founded in 1977. The party was the ruling party of Andalusia uninterruptedly from 1978 to 2019, having won all regional elections in that time except for the 2012 election, after which it nonetheless was able to maintain the regional government through a coalition with United Left. It lost power for the first time after the 2018 election, when a PP-Cs coalition was formed. In the 2026 election, it worsened its already worst result ever.

== Leaders ==
=== Presidents of Andalusia ===
- Plácido Fernández Viagas, 1978–1979
- Rafael Escuredo, 1979–1984
- José Rodríguez de la Borbolla, 1984–1990
- Manuel Chaves, 1990–2009
- Gaspar Zarrías, 2009 (acting)
- José Antonio Griñán, 2009–2013
- Susana Díaz, 2013–2019

=== Party leaders ===
- José Rodríguez de la Borbolla, 1977–1988
- Carlos Sanjuán, 1999–1994
- Manuel Chaves, 1994–2010
- José Antonio Griñán, 2010–2013
- Susana Díaz, 2013–2021
- Juan Espadas, 2021–2025
- María Jesús Montero, 2025–present

== Electoral performance ==
=== Parliament of Andalusia ===
Parliament of Andalusia
Election	Leading candidate	Votes	%	Seats	Gov.
1982	Rafael Escuredo	1,498,619	52.6 (#1)	66 / 109	Yes
1986	José Rodríguez de la Borbolla	1,581,513	47.0 (#1)	60 / 109	Yes
1990	Manuel Chaves	1,368,576	49.6 (#1)	62 / 109	Yes
1994	Manuel Chaves	1,395,131	38.7 (#1)	45 / 109	Yes
1996	Manuel Chaves	1,903,160	44.1 (#1)	52 / 109	Yes
2000	Manuel Chaves	1,790,653	44.3 (#1)	52 / 109	Yes
2004	Manuel Chaves	2,260,545	50.4 (#1)	61 / 109	Yes
2008	Manuel Chaves	2,178,296	48.4 (#1)	56 / 109	Yes
2012	José Antonio Griñán	1,527,923	39.6 (#2)	47 / 109	Yes
2015	Susana Díaz	1,411,278	35.4 (#1)	47 / 109	Yes
2018	Susana Díaz	1,010,889	27.9 (#1)	33 / 109	No
2022	Juan Espadas	883,707	24.1 (#2)	30 / 109	No
2026	María Jesús Montero	955,584	22.8 (#2)	28 / 109	No

=== Cortes Generales ===
Cortes Generales
Election	Andalusia						
Election	Congress					Senate	
Election	Votes	%	#	Seats	+/–	Seats	+/–
1977	1,059,037	36.16%	1st	27 / 59	—	16 / 32	—
1979	986,842	33.53%	1st	23 / 59	4	19 / 32	3
1982	2,064,865	60.45%	1st	43 / 59	20	24 / 32	5
1986	1,923,891	57.07%	1st	42 / 60	1	24 / 32	0
1989	1,793,717	52.55%	1st	42 / 61	0	24 / 32	0
1993	2,063,899	51.45%	1st	37 / 61	5	24 / 32	0
1996	2,017,857	46.66%	1st	32 / 62	5	24 / 32	0
2000	1,771,968	43.86%	1st	30 / 62	2	18 / 32	6
2004	2,377,455	52.86%	1st	38 / 61	8	24 / 32	6
2008	2,342,277	51.93%	1st	36 / 61	2	22 / 32	2
2011	1,594,893	36.60%	2nd	25 / 60	11	10 / 32	12
2015	1,402,393	31.50%	1st	22 / 61	3	17 / 32	5
2016	1,326,838	31.20%	2nd	20 / 61	2	14 / 32	3
2019 (Apr)	1,568,682	34.22%	1st	24 / 61	4	24 / 32	10
2019 (Nov)	1,425,126	33.36%	1st	25 / 61	1	23 / 32	1
2023	1,467,501	33.48%	2nd	21 / 61	4	11 / 32	12

=== European Parliament ===
European Parliament
Election	Andalusia		
Election	Votes	%	#
1987	1,491,525	48.27%	1st
1989	1,288,676	50.26%	1st
1994	1,479,280	41.07%	1st
1999	1,609,861	43.29%	1st
2004	1,349,475	54.38%	1st
2009	1,265,633	48.16%	1st
2014	940,501	35.13%	1st
2019	1,547,896	40.53%	1st
