= José Antonio Griñán =

Spanish politician (born 1946)

Excelentísimo Señor Don José Antonio Griñán Martínez
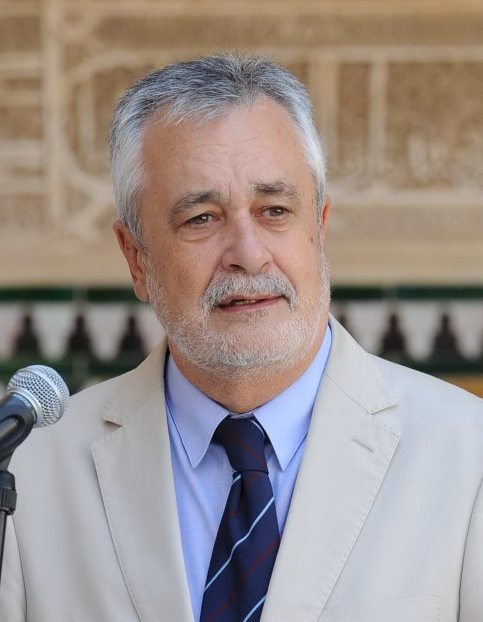

4th President of the Regional Government of Andalusia
- In office 22 April 2009 – 5 September 2013; Acting: 27 August – 5 September 2013
- Monarch: Juan Carlos I
- Preceded by: Manuel Chaves (acting, Gaspar Zarrías)
- Succeeded by: Susana Díaz

Secretary-General of the Socialist Workers' Party of Andalusia
- In office 16 March 2010 – 23 November 2013
- Preceded by: Manuel Chaves
- Succeeded by: Susana Díaz

Second Vice President of the Regional Government of Andalusia
- In office 18 April 2008 – 23 April 2009
- Preceded by: Office created
- Succeeded by: Office abolished

Councillor of Economy and Finance of Andalusia
- In office 24 April 2004 – 23 April 2009
- Preceded by: José Salgueiro
- Succeeded by: Carmen Martínez Aguayo

Minister of Labor and Social Policy
- In office 13 July 1993 – 5 May 1996
- President: Felipe González
- Preceded by: Luis Martínez Noval
- Succeeded by: Javier Arenas

Minister of Health and Consumption
- In office 14 January 1992 – 13 July 1993
- President: Felipe González
- Preceded by: Julián García Valverde
- Succeeded by: Ángeles Amador

Member of the Congress of Deputies
- In office 7 June 1993 – 14 March 2004
- Constituency: Cordoba

Member of the Senate
- In office 12 September 2013 – 15 June 2015
- Constituency: Andalusia

Member of the Parliament of Andalusia
- In office 14 March 2004 – 12 September 2013
- Constituency: Cordoba and Seville

Personal details
- Born: 7 June 1946 (age 80) Madrid, Spanish State
- Party: Spanish Socialist Workers' Party (PSOE)
- Spouse: María Teresa Caravaca de Juan
- Education: University of Seville
- Profession: Public servant

José Antonio Griñán Martínez (born 7 June 1946) is a Spanish politician. He was the chairman of the centre-left Spanish Socialist Workers' Party (PSOE), and from 23 April 2009 until 7 September 2013 he held the position of President of the Regional Government of Andalusia. He was sentenced to 6 years of prison due to prevarication and embezzlement of public funds in the granting of aid to companies in crisis for 10 years worth 680 million euros.

He replaced Manuel Chaves when Chaves was named Third Deputy Prime Minister of Spain of the Government of Spain in charge of Territorial Policy. In 2013 he announced his intention of stepping down and was subsequently replaced by the then regional Minister of the Presidency Susana Díaz.

== Biography ==
Born in Madrid in 1946, his family moved to Andalusia. He graduated in law at the University of Seville, and started a public service career, finishing with the third best result on the 1969 competitive examination for the position of junior labour inspector, his first assignment was in 1970 in Zaragoza and he finally established in 1974, in Seville.

He joined the PSOE at the beginning of the 1980s, and after the socialist victory in the Andalusian parliamentary elections of 23 May 1982 (the first such elections to be held, since the Spanish transition to democracy), served as vice minister of Labour in the Andalusian governments presided over by Rafael Escuredo and José Rodríguez de la Borbolla, until in 1986 when he was named vice minister of Health. In 1987 he was named technical secretary general of the Andalusian Labour Ministry and in 1990 was named as minister of health in the first government of Manuel Chaves. He served three terms as a deputy for Cordoba at the Congress of Deputies. First elected in the 1993 Spanish General election, he was reelected in 1996 and 2000. There, he served as twice as a minister during the Felipe González premiership: from 1992 to 1993 as minister of health and consumption and from 1993 to 1996 as ministry labour and social affairs. By March 2004 he served instead as deputy for Córdoba in the Parliament of Andalusia.

In April 2004, Manuel Chaves named him minister of economy and finance, and later, in 2008, he was given the additional role of second vice president of Andalusia . On 5 April 2009, after the naming of Chaves as their vice president of Spain, his name was announced as the most likely successor Chaves at the Presidency of Andalusia, and eight days later the Regional Committee of the PSOE-A (the Andalusian federation of PSOE) officially proclaimed his candidature.

On 19 November 2019, Griñán was convicted to six years of prison, and banned for fifteen years from holding any public office, for crimes of perverting the course of justice and embezzlement related to the ERE lawsuit.

=== Presidency ===
On 22 April 2009 Griñán was voted in as President of Andalusia by the Andalusian parliament, with 56 votes in favor (PSOE) and 53 against (PP and IU). He took office on 23 April. Three former Andalusian presidents attended the ceremony—Rafael Escuredo, José Rodríguez de la Borbolla and Manuel Chaves—together with the President of Castile-La Mancha, José María Barreda; the Secretary of State for Immigration, Consuelo Rumí; and the President of the High Court of Andalusia, Augusto Méndez de Lugo.

In the 2012 regional election his party, PSOE, lost the absolute majority in the Parliament getting only 47 seats out of 109. Griñán had to make an agreement with United Left to secure a majority coalition government and keep his position as the President of Andalusia. In the terms of this agreement, the leader of United Left, Diego Valderas, became the vice-president of Andalusia. On 26 June 2013 he announced he would not seek reelection. His party entered in a substitute election process won by Susana Díaz. On 27 August Griñán announced he was stepping down. On 7 September Díaz took the chair.

Then he entered the Senate as senator autonomy elected by the Parliament of Andalusia. On 15 June 2015 he left his seat as senator autonomy after being charged in the corruption scandal case named ERE.

=== Honors ===
Griñán is a recipient of the Grand Cross of the Order of Charles III, which gives him the honorific of Excelentísimo Señor.

== Notes ==
Political offices
Preceded by Eduardo Rejón	Councillor of Health of Andalusia; 1990–1992	Succeeded by José Luis García de Arboleya
Preceded by Julián García Valverde	Minister of Health and Consumption; 1992–1993	Succeeded by Ángeles Amador
Preceded by Luis Martínez Noval	Minister of Labor and Social Policy; 1993–1996	Succeeded by Javier Arenas
Preceded by José Salgueiro	Councillor of Economy and Finance of Andalusia; 2004–2009	Succeeded by Carmen Martínez Aguayo
Preceded by Office created	Second Vice President of the Regional Government of Andalusia; 2008–2009	Succeeded by Office abolished
Preceded by Manuel Chaves	President of the Regional Government of Andalusia; 2009–2013	Succeeded by Susana Díaz
Party political offices
Preceded by Manuel Chaves	Secretary-General of the Socialist Workers' Party of Andalusia; 2010–2013	Succeeded by Susana Díaz
Preceded by Manuel Chaves	President of the Spanish Socialist Workers' Party; 2012–2014	Succeeded by Micaela Navarro
