= María Jesús Serrano =

Spanish politician (born 1970)

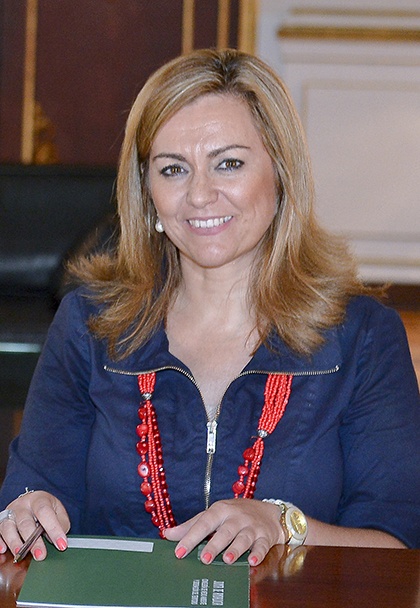
- Serrano in 2014

Member of the Senate
- In office 28 April 2019 – 29 May 2023
- Constituency: Córdoba

Member of the Congress of Deputies
- In office 13 January 2016 – 5 March 2019
- Constituency: Córdoba

Personal details
- Born: 24 November 1970 (age 55)
- Party: Spanish Socialist Workers' Party

María Jesús Serrano Jiménez (born 24 November 1970) is a Spanish politician. She has served as mayor of Baena since 2023, having previously served from 2011 to 2013. From 2019 to 2023, she was a member of the Senate. From 2016 to 2019, she was a member of the Congress of Deputies.
