= Susana Díaz =

Spanish politician (born 1974)

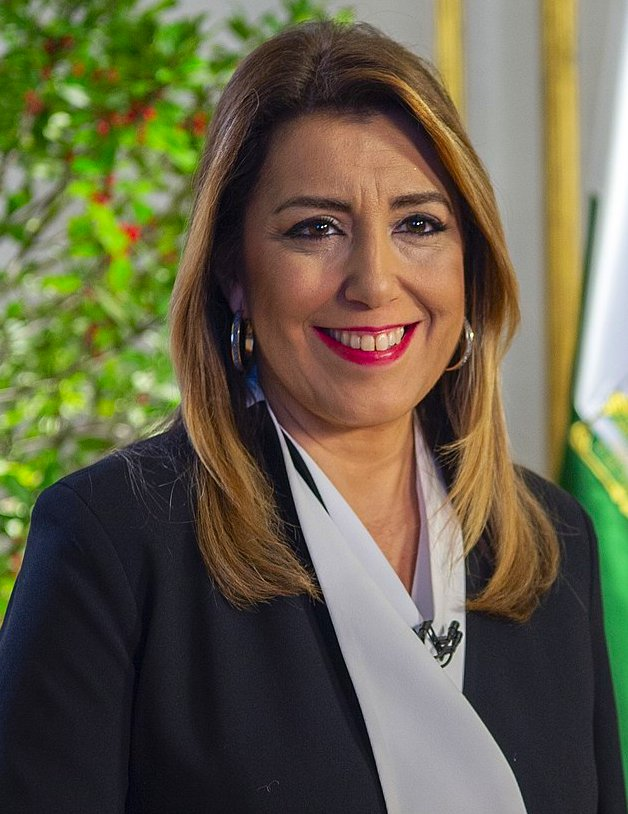
- Díaz in 2018

5th President of the Autonomous Government of Andalusia
- In office 5 September 2013 – 18 January 2019
- Monarchs: Juan Carlos I; Felipe VI
- Deputy: Diego Valderas (2012–2015); Manuel Jiménez (2015–2019)
- Preceded by: José Antonio Griñán
- Succeeded by: Juanma Moreno

Secretary-General of the Socialist Workers' Party of Andalusia
- In office 23 November 2013 – 23 July 2021
- President: Micaela Navarro
- Preceded by: José Antonio Griñán
- Succeeded by: Juan Espadas

Member of the Congress of Deputies
- In office 1 April 2004 – 2 April 2008
- Constituency: Seville

Member of the Senate
- Incumbent
- Assumed office 22 July 2021
- Appointed by: Parliament of Andalusia
- In office 21 December 2011 – 6 May 2012
- Appointed by: Parliament of Andalusia

Member of the Parliament of Andalusia
- In office 3 April 2008 – 25 September 2021
- Constituency: Seville

Member of the Seville City Council
- In office 4 July 1999 – 2 April 2004

Personal details
- Born: Susana Díaz Pacheco; 18 October 1974 (age 52) Seville, Andalusia, Spanish State
- Citizenship: Spanish
- Party: Spanish Socialist Workers' Party
- Spouse: José María Moriche Ibáñez
- Children: José María
- Parent(s): José Díaz; Rosa Pacheco
- Education: University of Seville

Susana Díaz Pacheco (Spanish pronunciation: [suˈsana ˈði.aθ]; born 18 October 1974) is a Spanish politician from Andalusia and the former leader of the Spanish Socialist Workers' Party of Andalusia (PSOE–A).

She served as the president of Andalusia following José Antonio Griñán's resignation in 2013. She was subsequently re-elected in Andalusia's 2015 regional election. In the 2018 snap election her party lost close to a third of seats and, despite remaining the most voted party, she was ousted in 2019 by Juanma Moreno, leader of the People's Party of Andalusia, who received support from the center-right party Ciudadanos and the far-right party Vox.

In 2017, during her tenure as president of Andalusia, she was a candidate in the PSOE federal party congress for the party's national leadership but was by defeated by Pedro Sánchez.

== Early life ==
Díaz is the eldest child of José Díaz, a plumber, and Rosa Pacheco, a housewife. She has three sisters. In 2015, she gave birth to a son. Díaz studied law at the University of Seville.

== Career ==
=== Congresswoman and senator (2004–2012) ===
Díaz held various political positions within the Spanish Socialist Workers' Party (PSOE) and was a senator for Andalusia from 2011 to 2012.

=== Minister in the Government of Andalusia (2012–2013) ===
On 6 May 2012, José Antonio Griñán placed her at the head of the Ministry of Presidency and Equality in the Junta de Andalucía. She was Secretary General of the PSOE in Seville between 14 July 2012 and 30 November 2013.

=== President of Andalusia (2013–2019) ===
==== First term (2013–2015) ====
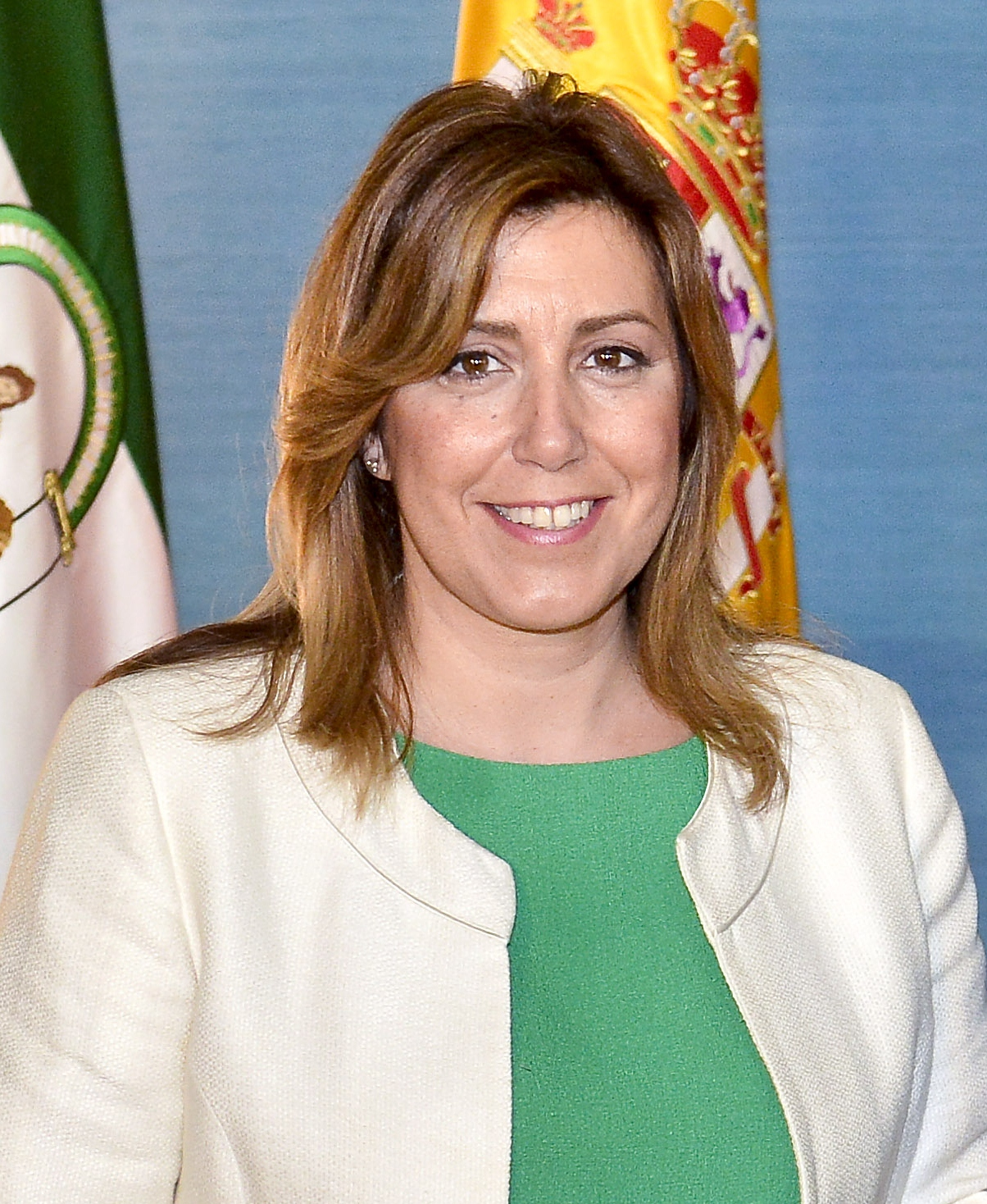
Díaz in 2014

Díaz was elected as President of Andalusia in 2013, ruling in coalition with the left-wing United Left party.

===== Role in Pedro Sánchez's 2014 leadership election =====
In the aftermath of 2014 European Parliament election in Spain, PSOE's national leader Alfredo Pérez Rubalcaba resigned and a leadership contest was held. Díaz did not run, but a coalition of regional leaders including herself opposed the candidacy of early front-runner Eduardo Madina, who was seen as Rubalcaba's heir, and supported a change in the party's policies. These regional leaders backed economist Pedro Sánchez to become the party's new leader. Sánchez won a majority of the party members' vote. To offset this, critical regional leaders entered PSOE's executive committee.

==== Second term (2015–2019) ====
Following a disagreement with the United Left, Díaz called for early elections, which were held in 2015. During the 2015 Andalusian parliamentary election, Díaz led a forceful campaign against Prime Minister Mariano Rajoy, opposing the austerity policies enacted by his central government. Díaz also insisted that the Socialists would not form an alliance with the PP or Podemos if the vote failed to produce an outright winner.

In the election, Díaz's party retained the same number of seats as before the election, 47. The election was considered a victory for the PSOE, as it regained its status as the largest party in the Andalusian Parliament. This was because the main opposition, PP, lost 17 seats and Díaz's former coalition partner, United Left, lost 7 seats. Two new parties, the left-wing Podemos and the centre-right Citizens, won 15 and 9 seats respectively. After a long period of three-way negotiations with the two new parties, Díaz agreed with Citizens, and in early May 2015, she was subsequently re-elected as regional President.

===== 2016 PSOE crisis =====
General elections were held in Spain in December 2015. Prime Minister Mariano Rajoy's PP won the most seats, but refused to form a government as a majority of the Congress of Deputies were hostile to him. King Felipe VI then invited the runner-up PSOE leader Pedro Sánchez to form a government; however, Díaz and her coalition of regional leaders barred Sánchez from forming a government with the third-place left-wing populist, anti-austerity Podemos thus forcing him to make a deal with the fourth-place, liberal-conservative Citizens. However, this arrangement would not achieve parliamentary majority, and repeat general elections were held six months later in 2016 while Rajoy remained prime minister in a caretaker capacity. Díaz warned Sánchez that the party would not tolerate another electoral loss.

In the 2016 election, the PSOE maintained second place and lost five seats, while Rajoy's PP came first and gained 14 seats; King Felipe VI invited Rajoy to form a government, however, a majority of Congress was still hostile to him. Despite another second-place showing as PSOE leader, Sánchez was confident he could form a government with the 180 (out of 350) deputies who opposed Rajoy and the PP, including Podemos as well as Catalan and Basque regionalist and separatist parties. Díaz, meanwhile, advocated that the PSOE should remain in opposition and allow Rajoy to form a government. This, added to more defeats of PSOE in Galicia and Basque Country regional elections, being overtaken by Podemos-led alliances and achieving record low results, prompted dissenters—led by Susana Díaz—to call for Sánchez's immediate resignation as PSOE leader and led to a party crisis. Sánchez challenged his critics to defeat him in a primary election, however, by 1 October he had lost control of both the Executive and Federal Party Committees, resigning as party leader and as an MP. A caretaker committee led by Asturian president Javier Fernández ordered all PSOE MPs to abstain in order to allow Rajoy to remain in office, considering the alternative was a third election which was feared by the caretaker committee as opinion polls were predicting a PP landslide and that the PSOE would be overtaken by Podemos. Ultimately, fifteen PSOE MPs broke party discipline and voted against Rajoy.

===== 2017 run for PSOE leader =====
Díaz submitted her bid for the 2017 PSOE leadership election, along with Pedro Sánchez and Patxi López. She was supported by three former party leaders—Felipe González, José Luis Rodríguez Zapatero and Alfredo Pérez Rubalcaba—as well as several former PSOE ministers and regional leaders. Sánchez used Díaz's support from party leaders to portray her as the establishment's candidate. Díaz lost the election, with a 10-point deficit to Sánchez in the membership vote.

===== 2018 snap election and loss of regional power =====
In May 2018, national PSOE leader Pedro Sánchez filed a vote of no confidence in the government of Mariano Rajoy, that placed himself as Prime Minister of Spain with the support of Podemos, and Catalan and Basque nationalist parties. Citizens, Díaz's partner in Andalusia, was strongly opposed to these parties and withdrew its support from PSOE and Díaz, triggering a snap election. In the 2018 Andalusian regional election, support for Díaz's PSOE dropped to 33 seats, losing 14 from the previous election. While it was still the most-voted party in Andalusia Díaz lost the presidency of Andalusia to the PP and Citizens, who joined forces with Vox, a new political party that won 12 seats and was labelled by Diaz as "far-right".

Political offices
Preceded by Mar Moreno; Presidency; Micaela Navarro; Equality and Social Welfare	Councillor of the Presidency and Equality of Andalusia; 2012–2013	Succeeded by Manuel Jiménez Barrios; Presidency; María José Sánchez Rubio; Equality, Health and Social Welfare
Preceded by José Antonio Griñán	President of the Regional Government of Andalusia; 2013–2019	Succeeded by Juanma Moreno
Party political offices
Preceded by José Antonio Griñán	Secretary-General of the Socialist Workers' Party of Andalusia; 2013–2021	Succeeded by Juan Espadas
