= Luis Martínez Noval =

Spanish politician & economist (1948–2013)

Luis Martínez Noval

Luis Martínez Noval (3 July 1948 – 30 March 2013) was a Spanish economist and politician who was a member of the Spanish Socialist Workers' Party and served from 1990 to 1993 as Spain's Minister of Labor.

== Early life and career ==
Noval was born in Infiesto, capital of the Asturian council of Piloña. After graduating from Colegio de la Inmaculada of Gijón in 1965, he studied economics at the University of Oviedo from which he graduated with a degree in Economic Sciences. He then served as a non-tenured professor of Economic Theory at his alma mater before deciding to devote himself exclusively to his work as a professional politician in the region. In 1981, he was elected as the Deputy Secretary-General of the Spanish Socialist Workers' Party (PSOE) of Asturias of which he was a member since 1978. From 1988 to 2000 Noval was a general secretary of the same party and then became a member of its Federal Executive Commission. From October 1982 to November 2001 he served as the party's Deputy to the Cortes of Asturias. On 2 May 1990, Noval was appointed as Minister of Labor and Social Security of the Government of Spain by Felipe González and served on this position until 14 July 1993. Following the expiration of his term, he became a Chairman of the Committee on Social Policy and Employment of the Congress of Deputies and from 1996 to 1999 was spokesman for the party. In 2001, the PSOE appointed him a member of the Court of Auditors.

== Death ==
On 29 March 2013, Noval fell on the street in Oviedo during which he sustained a severe head wound. He was rushed to the Hospital Universitario Central de Asturias where, following an unsuccessful operation, at the age of 64, he was pronounced dead the next morning.
