= Manuel Chaves (politician) =

Spanish politician (born 1945)

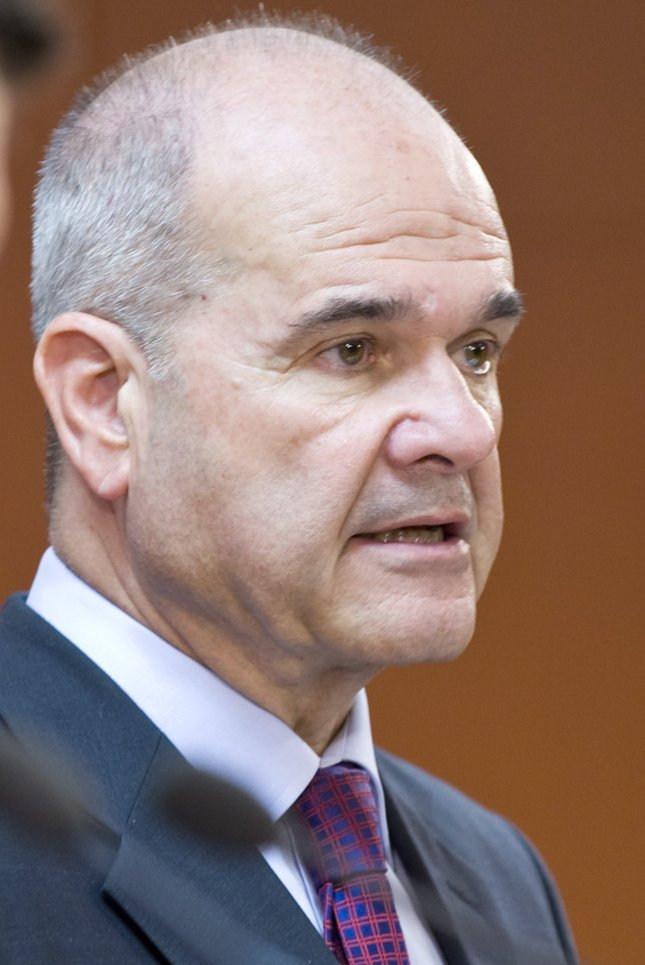

Second Deputy Prime Minister of Spain
- In office 11 July 2011 – 21 December 2011
- Prime Minister: José Luis Rodríguez Zapatero
- Preceded by: Elena Salgado
- Succeeded by: Pablo Iglesias Turrión (2020)

Third Deputy Prime Minister of Spain
- In office 7 April 2009 – 11 July 2011
- Prime Minister: José Luis Rodríguez Zapatero
- Preceded by: Fernando Abril Martorell (1978)
- Succeeded by: Nadia Calviño (2020)

Minister of Territorial Policy of Spain (Note: Minister of Territorial Policy from 2009 to 2010 and Minister of Territorial Policy and Public Administration from 2010 to 2011.)
- In office 7 April 2009 – 22 December 2011
- Prime Minister: José Luis Rodríguez Zapatero
- Preceded by: Elena Salgado
- Succeeded by: Cristóbal Montoro

President of the Regional Government of Andalusia
- In office 25 July 1990 – 7 April 2009
- Monarch: Juan Carlos I
- Preceded by: José Rodríguez de la Borbolla
- Succeeded by: Gaspar Zarrías (acting)

Minister of Labour and Social Security of Spain
- In office 26 July 1986 – 2 May 1990
- Prime Minister: Felipe González
- Preceded by: Joaquín Almunia
- Succeeded by: Luis Martínez Noval

Member of the Congress of Deputies
- In office 13 December 2011 – 25 June 2015
- Constituency: Cádiz
- In office 15 June 1977 – 12 June 1990
- Constituency: Cádiz

Member of the Parliament of Andalusia
- In office 23 June 1990 – 7 April 2009
- Constituency: Cádiz

Personal details
- Born: 7 July 1945 (age 80) Ceuta, Spain
- Party: PSOE

Manuel Chaves González (born 7 July 1945) is a Spanish politician who served as Third Deputy Prime Minister of Spain from 2009 to 2011 and Second Deputy Prime Minister of Spain in 2011. He is a member of the Spanish Socialist Workers' Party (PSOE) and was the Chairman of PSOE from 2000 to 2012. From 1990 to 2009 he was the President of the Regional Government of Andalusia. He is a trustee of the Fundacion IDEAS, a socialist think tank. On 17 February 2015, together with former President of Andalusia, José Antonio Griñán, was implicated in the ERE case, a huge corruption scandal in the region.

== National MP ==
Chaves entered national politics in 1977 when he was elected to the Spanish Congress of Deputies, representing Cádiz serving in Congress until 1990.

== Minister of the Spanish Government (1986-1990) ==
Manuel served as the Minister of Work and National Health Service (Seguridad Social) of Spain between 1986 and 1990, under Prime Minister Felipe Gonzalez.

In 1988, he suffered a general strike (first in the current Spanish democracy) call by, among others, the UGT and CCOO due to a proposed law change.

== President of the Autonomous Community of Andalusia (1990-2009) ==
In 1990, he became president of the Regional Government of Andalusia. At the time he was considered to be one of three barons of the PSOE, together with Juan Carlos Rodríguez Ibarra and José Bono, who were also autonomous presidents.

After the defeat of his party in the general election of 12 March 2000, after which Joaquín Almunia resigned as General Secretary of the party, Manuel took charge of the Political Commission. He organized the 35th Congress of the PSOE, which elected José Luis Rodríguez Zapatero as General Secretary.

== Deputy Prime Minister of Spain (2009-2011) ==
In April 2009, Prime Minister Zapatero designated Chaves as Third Vice President of the Government and Minister of Territorial Policy (the former Ministry of Public Administrations). Chaves was promoted to Second Deputy Prime Minister of Spain in July 2011 after Elena Salgado became First Deputy Prime Minister. He left office in December 2011.

== Notes ==
Political offices
Preceded by Joaquín Almunia	Minister of Labor and National Health Service; 1986-1990	Succeeded by Luís Martínez Noval
Preceded by José Rodríguez de la Borbolla	President of the Regional Government of Andalusia; 1990-2009	Succeeded by José Antonio Griñán
Preceded by Position created	Third Deputy Prime Minister of Spain; 2009-2011	Succeeded by Position abolished
Preceded by Elena Salgado	Minister of Territorial Policy; 2009-2010	Succeeded by Himself (As Minister of Territorial Policy and Public Administration)
Preceded by Himself (As Minister of Territorial Policy)	Minister of Territorial Policy and Public Administration; 2010-2011	Succeeded by Cristóbal Montoro (As Minister of Finance and Public Administration)
Preceded by Elena Salgado	Second Deputy Prime Minister of Spain; 2011	Succeeded by Office abolished
Party political offices
Preceded by Carlos Sanjuán	Secretary-General of the Socialist Workers Party of Andalusia; 1994-2010	Succeeded by José Antonio Griñán
Preceded by Interim Political Committee	President of the Spanish Socialist Workers Party; 2000-2012	Succeeded by José Antonio Griñán
