= People's Party of Andalusia =

People's Party of Andalusia Partido Popular de Andalucía
- President: Juan Manuel Moreno Bonilla
- Secretary-General: Loles López Gabarro
- Spokesperson: Carmen Crespo
- Founded: 1989
- Headquarters: C/ San Fernando, 39; 41004 Seville, Andalusia
- Youth wing: New Generations of Andalusia
- Ideology: Conservatism; Liberal conservatism Christian democracy Economic liberalism
- Political position: Centre-right to right-wing
- National affiliation: People's Party
- Colors: Sky blue
- Parliament of Andalusia: 53 / 109
- Congress of Deputies (Andalusian Seats): 25 / 61
- Senate (Andalusian Seats): 14 / 41
- Local government in Andalusia: 2,681 / 9,031

Website
- www.ppandaluz.es

The People's Party of Andalusia (Spanish: Partido Popular de Andalucía, PP), informally also known as the Andalusian People's Party (Spanish: Partido Popular Andaluz, PPA), is the regional wing of the Spanish People's Party operating in Andalusia. It is the largest political party in the Parliament of Andalusia, and has an outright majority following the elections in 2022.

== Party leaders ==
- Gabino Puche, 1989–1993
- Javier Arenas, 1993–1999
- Teófila Martínez, 1999–2004
- Javier Arenas, 2004–2012
- Juan Ignacio Zoido, 2012–2014
- Juan Manuel Moreno Bonilla, 2014–present

== Electoral performance ==
=== Parliament of Andalusia ===
Parliament of Andalusia
Election	Leading candidate	Votes	%	Seats	Gov.
1990	Gabino Puche	611,734	22.2 (#2)	26 / 109	No
1994	Javier Arenas	1,238,252	34.4 (#2)	41 / 109	No
1996	Javier Arenas	1,466,980	34.0 (#2)	40 / 109	No
2000	Teófila Martínez	1,535,987	38.0 (#2)	46 / 109	No
2004	Teófila Martínez	1,426,774	31.8 (#2)	37 / 109	No
2008	Javier Arenas	1,730,154	38.5 (#2)	47 / 109	No
2012	Javier Arenas	1,570,833	40.7 (#1)	50 / 109	No
2015	Juanma Moreno	1,065,685	26.7 (#2)	33 / 109	No
2018	Juanma Moreno	750,778	20.7 (#2)	26 / 109	Yes
2022	Juanma Moreno	1,582,412	43.1 (#1)	58 / 109	Yes
2026	Juanma Moreno	1,744,728	41.6 (#1)	53 / 109	Yes

=== Cortes Generales ===
Cortes Generales
Election	Andalusia						
Election	Congress					Senate	
Election	#	%	Score	Seats	+/–	Seats	+/–
1989	688,625	20.~2	2nd	12 / 61	3 (Note: Compared to People's Coalition totals in the 1986 general election.)	7 / 32	1
1993	1,195,476	29.8	2nd	20 / 61	8	8 / 32	1
1996	1,530,057	35.4	2nd	24 / 62	4	8 / 32	0
2000	1,639,034	40.6	2nd	28 / 62	4	14 / 32	6
2004	1,514,987	33.7	2nd	23 / 61	5	8 / 32	6
2008	1,721,824	38.2	2nd	25 / 61	2	10 / 32	2
2011	1,985,612	45.6	1st	33 / 60	8	22 / 32	12
2015	1,294,293	29.1	2nd	21 / 61	12	15 / 32	7
2016	1,426,258	33.5	1st	23 / 61	2	18 / 32	3
Apr-2019	787,384	17.2	3rd	11 / 61	12	6 / 32	12
Nov-2019	877,202	20.5	2nd	15 / 61	4	9 / 32	3

=== European Parliament ===
European Parliament
Election	Andalusia		
Election	#	%	Score
1989	412,621	16.1	2nd
1994	1,254,932	34.8	2nd
1999	1,338,683	36.0	2nd
2004	896,401	36.1	2nd
2009	1,042,114	39.7	2nd
2014	693,322	25.9	2nd
2019	849,771	22.3	2nd
2024	1,104,516	37.9	1st
