= Juanma Moreno =

Spanish politician (born 1970)

The Most Excellent Juanma Moreno MP OIC
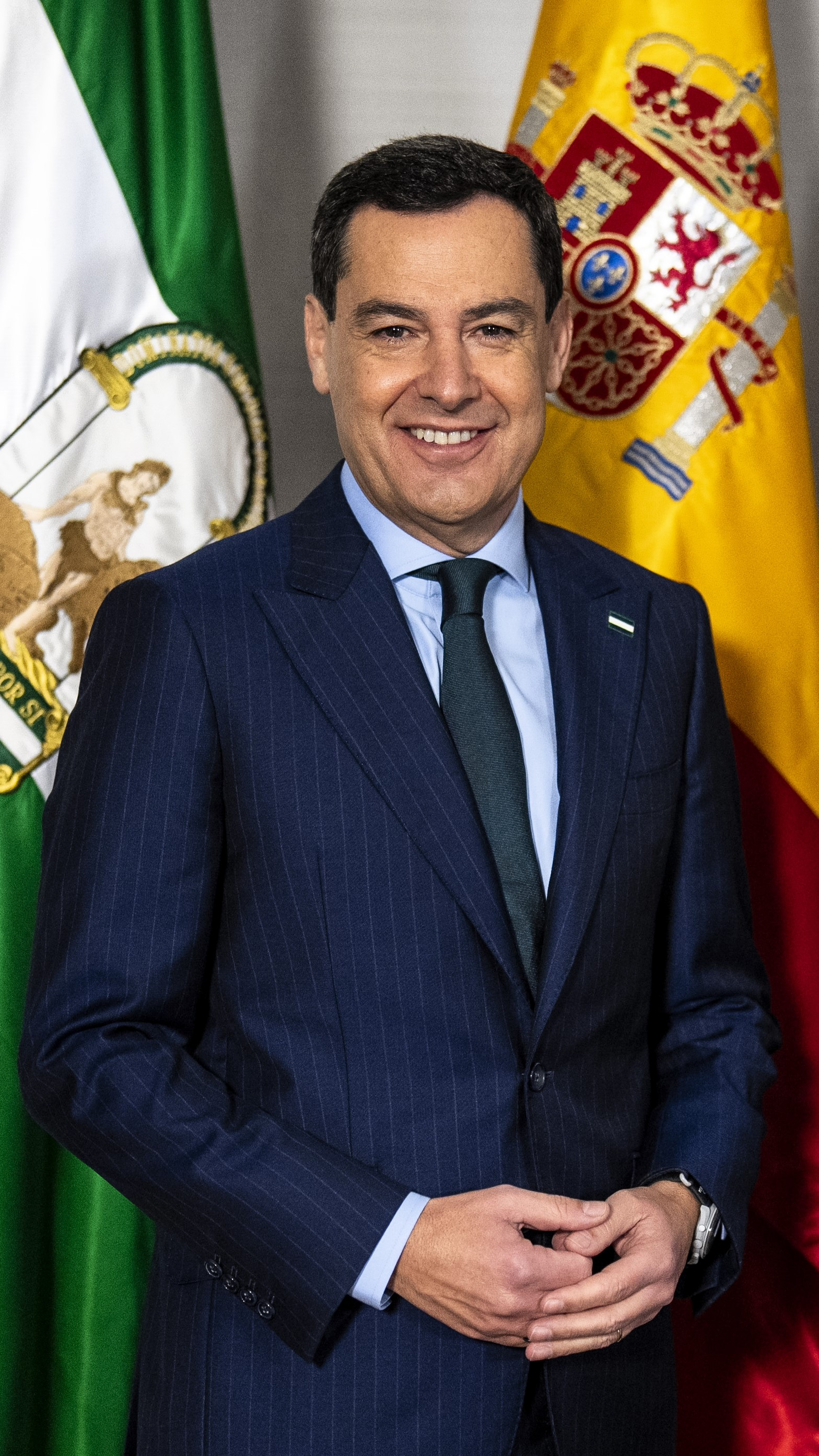
- Moreno in 2025

6th President of the Autonomous Government of Andalusia
- Incumbent
- Assumed office 18 January 2019
- Monarch: Felipe VI
- Deputy: Juan Marín (2019–2022)
- Preceded by: Susana Díaz

First Vice President of the European Committee of the Regions
- Incumbent
- Assumed office 19 February 2025
- President: Kata Tüttő
- Preceded by: Apostolos Tzitzikostas

President of the People's Party of Andalusia
- Incumbent
- Assumed office 1 March 2014
- Preceded by: Juan Ignacio Zoido

Member of the Congress of Deputies
- In office 12 March 2000 – 2 April 2004
- Constituency: Cantabria
- In office 1 March 2007 – 13 December 2011
- Constituency: Málaga

Member of the Senate
- In office 3 June 2014 – 27 September 2017
- Appointed by: Parliament of Andalusia

Member of the Parliament of Andalusia
- Incumbent
- Assumed office 16 April 2015
- Constituency: Málaga
- In office 3 March 1996 – 12 March 2000
- Constituency: Málaga

Personal details
- Born: Juan Manuel Moreno Bonilla; 1 May 1970 (age 56) Barcelona, Catalonia, Spain
- Party: People's Party
- Children: 3
- Education: Camilo José Cela University
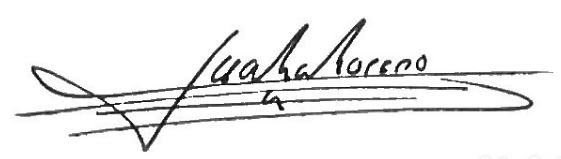
- Signature

Juan Manuel "Juanma" Moreno Bonilla (born 1 May 1970) is a Spanish politician and president of the Andalusian branch of the People's Party. Since 18 January 2019, he has been the President of the Government of Andalusia. He represented the Cantabria constituency in the Spanish Congress of Deputies from 2000 to 2004 and the Málaga constituency from 2007 to 2011. He has also been a member of the Senate of Spain and Parliament of Andalusia. Under his leadership, the regional branch of the People's Party has obtained both its worst result (in 2018) and its best result ever (in 2022) in percentage points. Since 19 February 2025, he has been the First Vice President of the European Committee of the Regions.

== Early life and education ==
Born in Barcelona (Catalonia) in 1970 as the second child of two Andalusian migrants (Juan Moreno & María Bonilla) originating from the town of Alhaurín el Grande in the Province of Málaga, Juan Manuel Moreno was only three months old when his family returned to their homeland, where he spent his childhood. Moreno acquired his bachelor's degree in Protocol and Institutional Relations at Camilo José Cela University (UCJC).

== Political career ==
Moreno started his career in the realm of politics when he ran, as a 24-year-old, in the Malaga municipal elections in the list of the Partido Popular (People's Party), the main conservative party in Spain, being elected city councillor. He also held the position of President of the New Generations of the party and coordinated the party's regional politics alongside Javier Arenas, who, as Moreno would from 2014 onwards, held the presidency of the party's Andalusian branch between 1993 and 1999.

=== Councillor, Málaga City Council (1995–1997) ===
In 1995, at the age of 25, he was elected Councillor for Youth and Sport of the Málaga city government, with Celia Villalobos as Mayor, as well as President of the Municipal Board of the district of Campanillas and Puerto de la Torre. A year later, he was already President of Nuevas Generaciones de Andalucía.

=== Regional deputy in the Parliament of Andalusia (1997–2000) ===
In 1997, at the age of 27, he was elected Member of Parliament for Malaga and spokesman for the Popular Parliamentary Group's Youth during the V Legislature of the Parliament of Andalusia. He was also elected president of New Generations at the national level and responsible for the party's Autonomous and Local Policy.

=== National Representative in Congress (2000–2011) ===
He was a national deputy in the Congress during the VII (for Cantabria), VIII, IX and X legislatures, acting as deputy spokesman of the Popular Group in the Science and Technology Commission and as secretary in the Social Affairs Commission.

He obtained a degree in Protocol and Organization of Events from the Camilo José Cela University, as well as several of his own degrees (Higher University Degree in Protocol and Institutional Relations from the Camilo José Cela University, Master's Degree in Business Management and Administration from the Escuela Autónoma de Dirección de Empresas and the Leadership Program for Public Management from IESE Business School) and a prize (Golden master's degree from the Royal Forum for Senior Management).

In September 2006, he married Granada-based political scientist Manuela Villena.

In the 2018 Andalusian elections, the People's Party list led by Moreno obtained a representation of 26 seats in the parliament, finishing second behind the Spanish Socialist Party (PSOE), which had been the only party in the government of Andalusia since Spain became a democracy, obtaining 33 seats. Despite the PP scoring one of its worst historical results in this autonomy, it was able to reach a government agreement with the liberal Ciudadanos (Cs), which had obtained 21 seats, and secured the support of Vox, the young far-right party that obtained 12 seats. This way, Moreno was elected president with the support of 59 of the 109 members in the Parliament of Andalusia. He thus became the first conservative president of Andalusia in Spain's four-decade-long democracy.

Due to the rejection by Vox of the 2022 budget, Moreno called for snap elections. In the 2022 autonomous elections, PP got an absolute majority with 58 seats, stopping Vox and defeating PSOE in its former stronghold.

Political offices
| Preceded by Laura Seara | Secretary of State for Social Services and Equality; 2011–2014 | Succeeded by Susana Camarero |
| Preceded by Susana Díaz | President of the Regional Government of Andalusia; 2019–present | Succeeded by Incumbent |
Party political offices
| Preceded by Pedro Calvo Poch | President of the New Generations of the People's Party; 1997–2001 | Succeeded by Carmen Fúnez de Gregorio |
| Preceded by Juan Ignacio Zoido | President of the People's Party of Andalusia; 2014–present | Succeeded by Incumbent |
