= Regional Government of Andalusia =

Government of the autonomous community of Andalusia, Spain

Regional Government of Andalusia Junta de Andalucía
- Seal of the Junta de Andalucía

Conjoined institutions overview
- Formed: 28 April 1978
- Jurisdiction: Andalusia
- Headquarters: Palace of San Telmo, Seville
- Minister responsible: Juan Manuel Moreno, President of the Regional Government of Andalusia
- Website: www.juntadeandalucia.es

The Regional Government of Andalusia (Spanish: Junta de Andalucía) is the government of the Autonomous Community of Andalusia. It consists of the Parliament, the President of the Regional Government and the Government Council. The 2026 budget was 51.6 billion euros. It employs about 500,000 workers.

== Institutions ==
=== Legislature ===
The Parliament of Andalusia is the House of Assembly for the region. Its main functions are to enact, amend or repeal laws and to appoint/remove the Governor. It is composed of deputies chosen by direct, universal suffrage, to represent the Andalusian people. The Parliament was constituted in 1982, after the approval of the Statute of Autonomy in 1981. Its current headquarters is in the former Hospital de las Cinco Llagas, Seville.

=== President ===
The President of the Regional Government of Andalusia is the executive chief of the Autonomous Community and the representative of the State in daily affairs; the President is appointed by an absolute majority of voting members in the Parliament and their election receives royal assent from the Monarch.

=== Government Council of Andalusia ===
The Government Council of Andalusia is the Cabinet of the Community. It regulates legal the authority and the performance of the executive and administrative situations of the Government. It is composed of the regional President and their various regional ministers who are in charge of the various Offices (Spanish: Consejerías) of the Andalusian Government. The Council convenes every Tuesday.
