= Francisco Serrano (Spanish politician) =

Spanish judge and politician (born 1965)

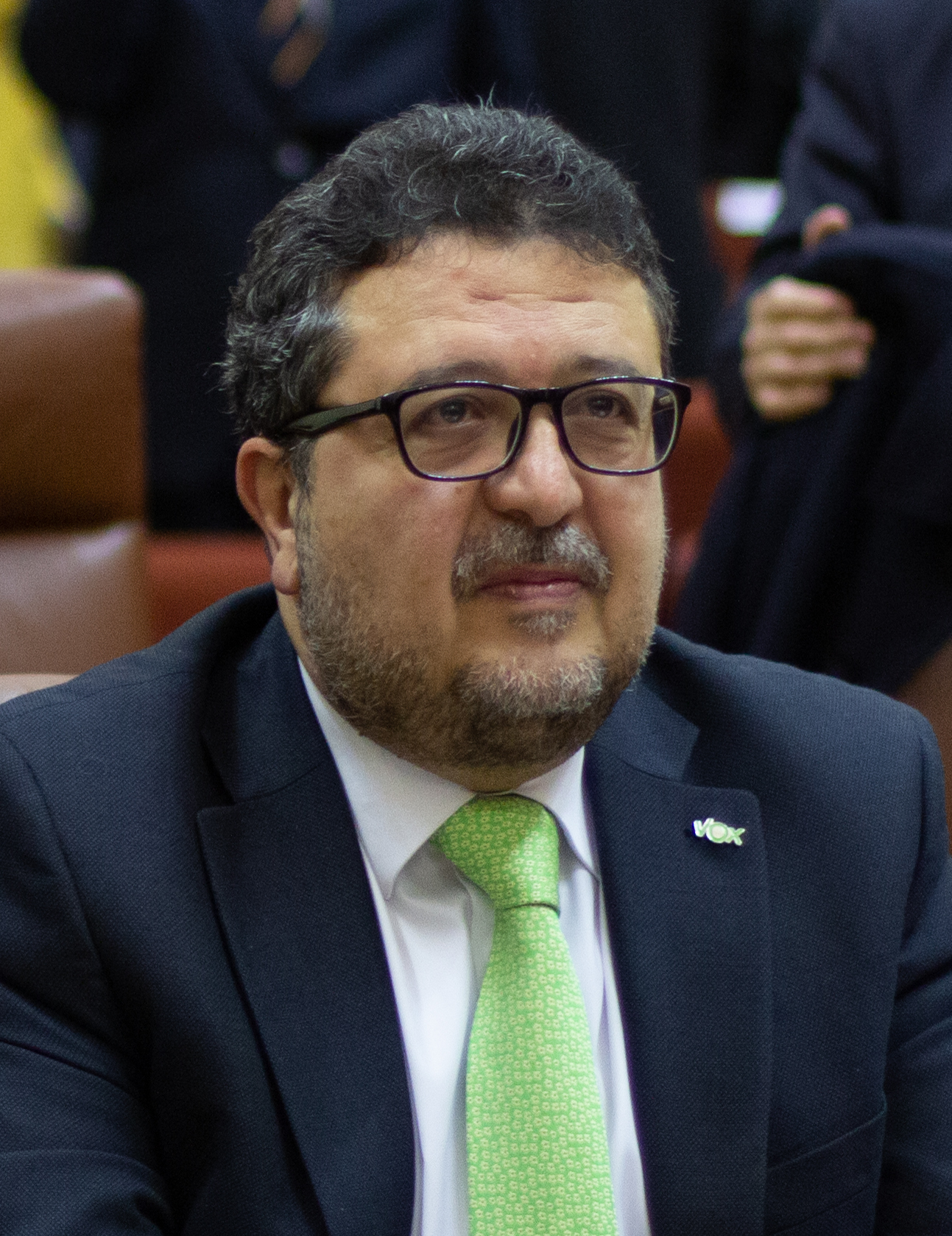

Francisco de Asís Serrano Castro (born 21 March 1965) is a Spanish former judge and politician of the Vox party.

He began work as a judge aged 25, and received national attention for his anti-feminist views, as well as for a child custody case in 2010. This case saw him disqualified for two years, then ten, and then fully absolved. A member of Vox from 2014, he was their candidate for President of the Regional Government of Andalusia in 2015 and 2018. In the latter election, the party entered the Parliament of Andalusia with 12 seats. He left Vox and his parliamentary seat in 2020 after being implicated in an alleged fraud.

== Early life and legal career ==
Serrano was born in Madrid and raised in Seville, where he graduated in law from the University of Seville. He began work as a judge in Valverde del Camino, Province of Huelva, in 1990.

In December 2009, Serrano publicly criticised Spain's law on gender violence, believing that it was being used for false allegations against men, and that it was unconstitutional to give perpetrators harsher sentences solely for being male. A group of separated and divorced men dressed as Santa Claus rallied in his support in front of his court.

In October 2011, Serrano was disqualified as a judge for two years by the High Court of Justice of Andalusia for perversion of justice by breaking the child custody arrangements set by another judge. The previous year, he had allowed a father to have one more day with his son, so that the boy could take part in a Semana Santa procession. The court ordered Serrano to pay €4,000 to the boy's mother, but found that Serrano did not act with intention. The following July, the Supreme Court of Spain found that he had acted with intention and increased his disqualification to 10 years, fining him €2,160. In October 2016, the Constitutional Court of Spain annulled the previous rulings; Serrano maintained that he had been a political victim for his views on gender.

== Political career ==
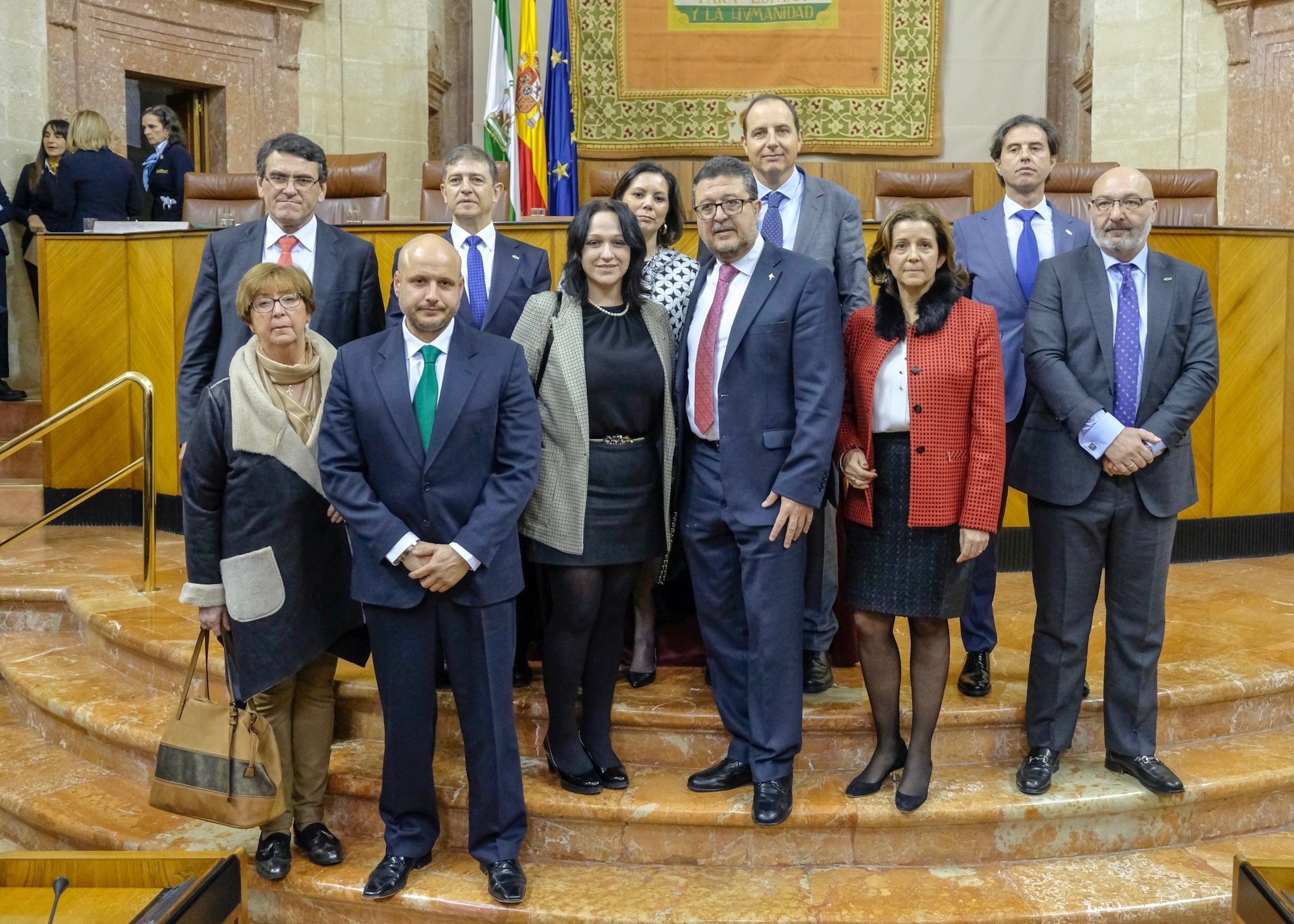
Serrano with other Vox deputies elected to the Parliament of Andalusia in 2018

Serrano joined the recently created political party Vox in October 2014. He was selected as their lead candidate for the 2015 Andalusian regional election. Vox came ninth, with 0.45% of the vote. He was also chosen as lead candidate for the 2018 election with 84% of the primary votes. Vox took 12 seats in the Parliament of Andalusia, a result which was referred to as the first electoral success by a far-right party since the Spanish transition to democracy.

Serrano wrote that "feminist supremacy" was a reason why the sentences for the La Manada rape case were increased by the Supreme Court to 15 years in June 2019. Vox disavowed him for this position.

In September 2020, Serrano quit Vox and his seat in parliament after being implicated in an alleged €2.6 million fraud. His seat and role as party leader in parliament went to Macario Valpuesta. He returned to work as a lawyer.

== Personal life ==
Serrano married fellow Seville legal graduate María José Maestre in May 1991. The couple have two daughters.
