= Juan Marín (Spanish politician) =

Spanish politician and businessman (born 1962)

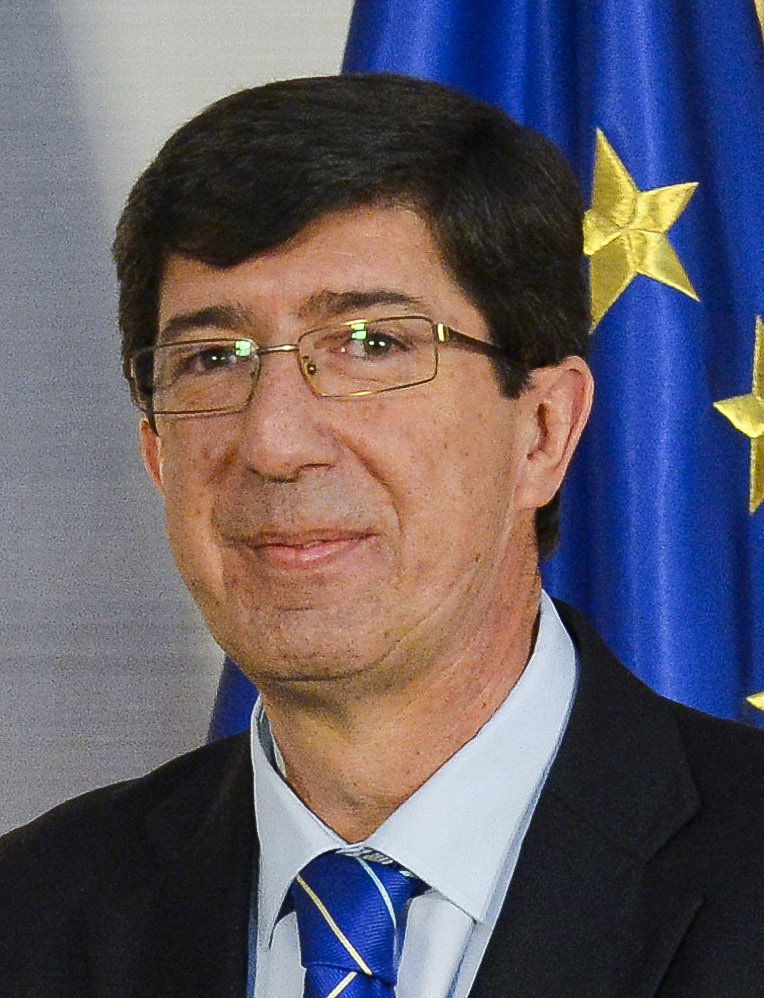
- Marín in 2015

Vice President of the Autonomous Government of Andalusia
- In office 22 January 2019 – 26 July 2022
- Monarch: Felipe VI
- President: Juanma Moreno
- Preceded by: Manuel Jiménez

Regional Minister of Tourism, Regeneration, Justice and Local Administration of Andalusia
- In office 22 January 2019 – 26 July 2022
- President: Juanma Moreno
- Preceded by: Rosa Aguilar; Justice and Autonomic Security; Javier Fernández; Tourism and Sports

Member of the Parliament of Andalusia
- In office 16 April 2015 – 14 July 2022
- Constituency: Seville

Personal details
- Born: Juan Antonio Marín Lozano; 31 December 1962 (age 62) Sanlúcar de Barrameda, Andalusia, Spain
- Political party: Cs

Juan Antonio Marín Lozano (born 31 December 1962) is a Spanish businessman and politician. He first took office in the 2007 local elections in which his local independent group was elected to the city council in his hometown of Sanlúcar de Barrameda in the Province of Cádiz. He served as deputy mayor until 2015, in government with the Spanish Socialist Workers' Party (PSOE).

Marín's group became integrated into the nationwide party Citizens (Cs). He was the party's candidate for President of the Regional Government of Andalusia in 2015, in which they entered the Parliament of Andalusia and provided support for PSOE incumbent Susana Díaz. In 2018, their support grew to 21 seats, and he served as Vice President in the first government of Juanma Moreno, a coalition between the People's Party (PP) and Cs. His party lost all their seats in the 2022 Andalusian regional election.

== Biography ==
=== Early life ===
Born in Sanlúcar de Barrameda, Province of Cádiz, Marín began a degree in Labour Relations but terminated it in 1981 to work in his family's jewellery company. He also led his hometown's Business Association.

=== Local politics ===
A town councillor from 2007 to 2015, Marín represented several parties before Citizens: the People's Alliance (AP), Andalusian Party (PA), and the Independent Citizens of Sanlúcar (CIS), a local grouping aligned with the Spanish Socialist Workers' Party (PSOE). His first nomination was on the AP's list for the 1983 elections, and he said that Sanlúcar's best mayor was the Communist José Luis Medina Lapieza (1979–1987) for doing "a lot when there weren't many resources".

In 2006, Marín reacted to a refuse collection strike by founding CIS, which took three council seats in 2007 and formed government with the PSOE, breaking the PP majority. He became deputy mayor, and the coalition repeated its success in 2011; in the same year, he allied CIS to Albert Rivera's nationwide party Citizens.

=== Regional politics ===
Marín was chosen as Citizens' lead candidate for the 2015 Andalusian regional election as the only of the three prospective candidates to meet the limit of endorsements. Running in Seville, he led the party to fourth place with nine seats on their entrance to the Parliament of Andalusia. He initially opposed the investiture of PSOE leader Susana Díaz as regional president or joining a coalition, before reaching an agreement to support her in the fourth vote in June.

In the 2018 Andalusian regional election, Citizens rose to 21 seats and third place, forming government with the PP and supported by Vox. PP leader Juanma Moreno became president and Marín the vice president in his government. Marín was also Minister for Tourism, Regeneration, Justice and Local Administration.

Marín led his party again in the 2022 Andalusian regional election, in which their parliamentary presence was wiped out and Moreno's PP won a majority. He broke down in tears on Onda Cero after the result, saying that his children could now get their father back.

== Personal life ==
Marín has long been involved in volleyball, as a coach, a member of the referees' association and a member of the sport's governing body in Andalusia.
