= Elías Bendodo =

Spanish politician (born 1974)

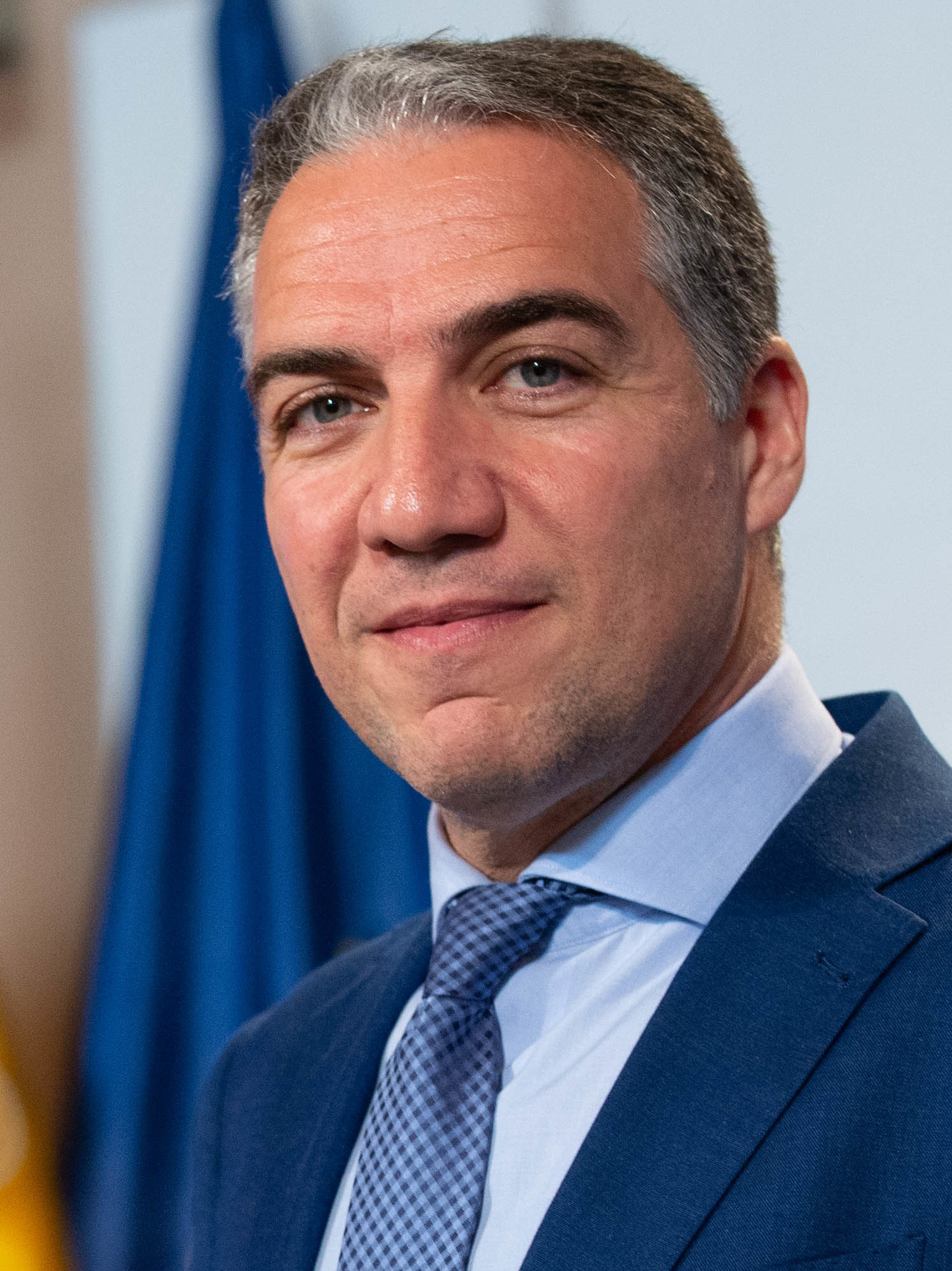
- Bendodo in 2019

Member of the Congress of Deputies
- Incumbent
- Assumed office 17 August 2023
- Constituency: Málaga

Member of the Senate
- In office 28 July 2022 – 26 July 2023
- Appointed by: Parliament of Andalusia

Personal details
- Born: 18 August 1974 (age 51)
- Party: People's Party

Elías Bendodo Benasayag (born 18 August 1974) is a Spanish politician serving as a member of the Congress of Deputies since 2023. From 2022 to 2023, he was a member of the Senate. From 2011 to 2019, he served as president of the Provincial Deputation of Málaga.
