= 2018 Andalusian regional election =

Election in the Spanish region of Andalusia

- 2 December 2018

All 109 seats in the Parliament of Andalusia 55 seats needed for a majority
- Opinion polls
- Registered: 6,542,076 ▲1.2%
- Turnout: 3,699,979 (56.6%) ▼5.7 pp
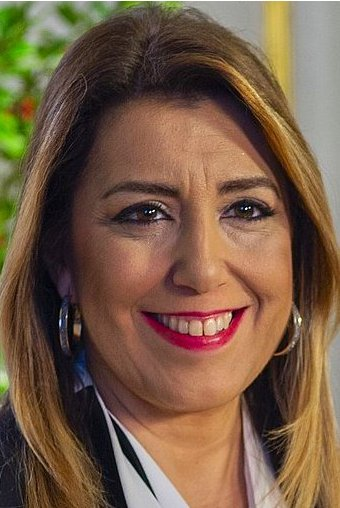

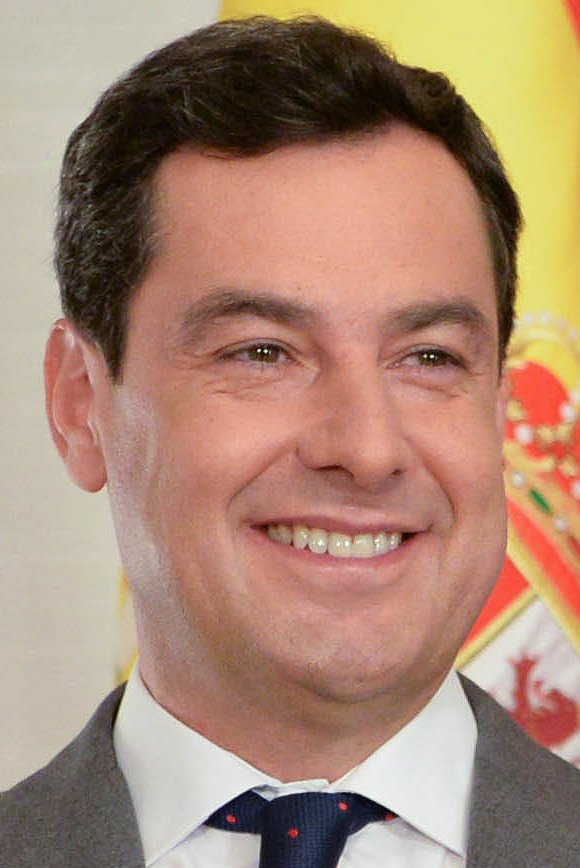

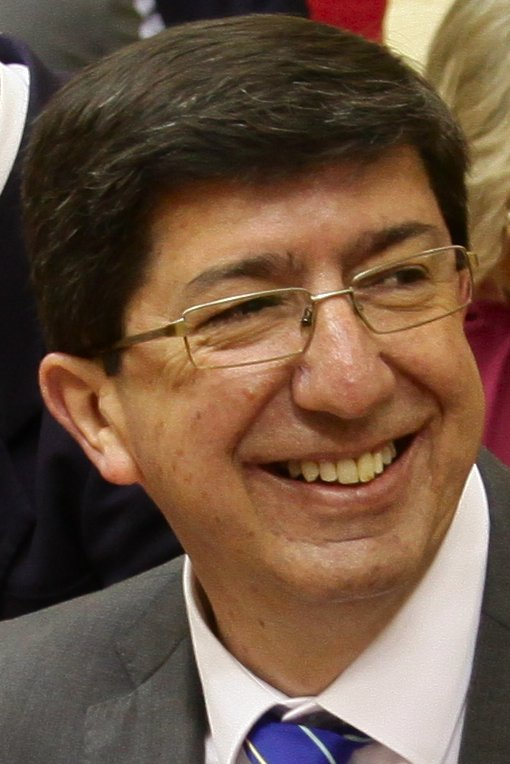

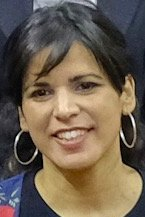

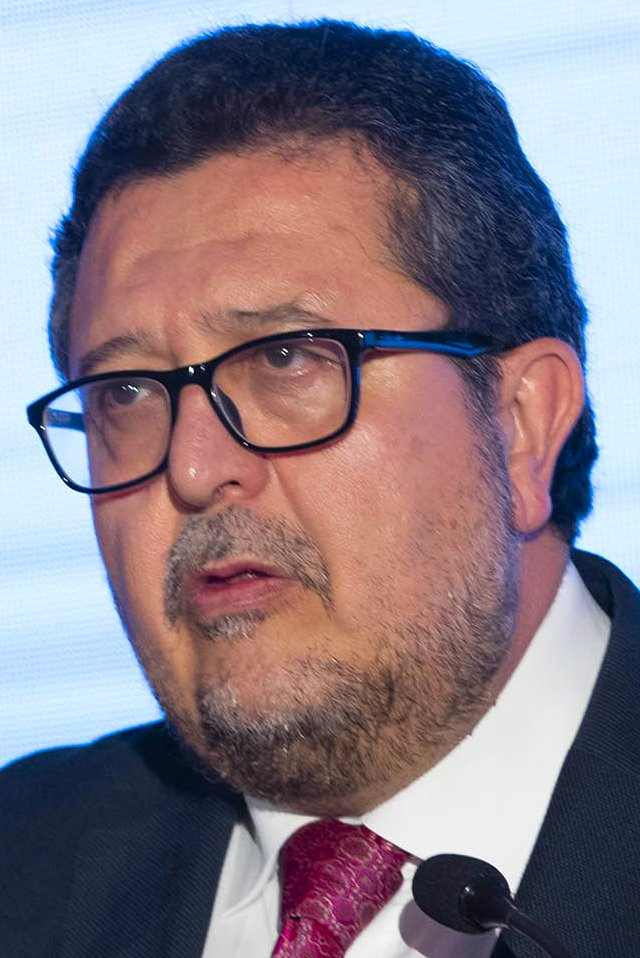
| | First party | Second party | Third party |
|---|---|---|---|
| Leader | Susana Díaz | Juanma Moreno | Juan Marín |
| Party | PSOE–A | PP | Cs |
| Leader since | 7 September 2013 | 1 March 2014 | 6 February 2015 |
| Leader's seat | Seville | Málaga | Seville |
| Last election | 47 seats, 35.4% | 33 seats, 26.7% | 9 seats, 9.3% |
| Seats won | 33 | 26 | 21 |
| Seat change | ▼14 | ▼7 | ▲12 |
| Popular vote | 1,010,889 | 750,778 | 661,371 |
| Percentage | 27.9% | 20.7% | 18.3% |
| Swing | ▼7.5 pp | ▼6.0 pp | ▲9.0 pp |
| | Fourth party | Fifth party |
| Leader | Teresa Rodríguez | Francisco Serrano |
| Party | Adelante Andalucía | Vox |
| Leader since | 9 February 2015 | 6 February 2015 |
| Leader's seat | Málaga | Seville |
| Last election | 20 seats, 21.7% (Note: Results for Podemos (14.9%, 15 seats) and IULV–CA (6.9%, 5 seats) in the 2015 election.) | 0 seats, 0.5% |
| Seats won | 17 | 12 |
| Seat change | ▼3 | ▲12 |
| Popular vote | 585,949 | 396,607 |
| Percentage | 16.2% | 11.0% |
| Swing | ▼5.5 pp | ▲10.5 pp |
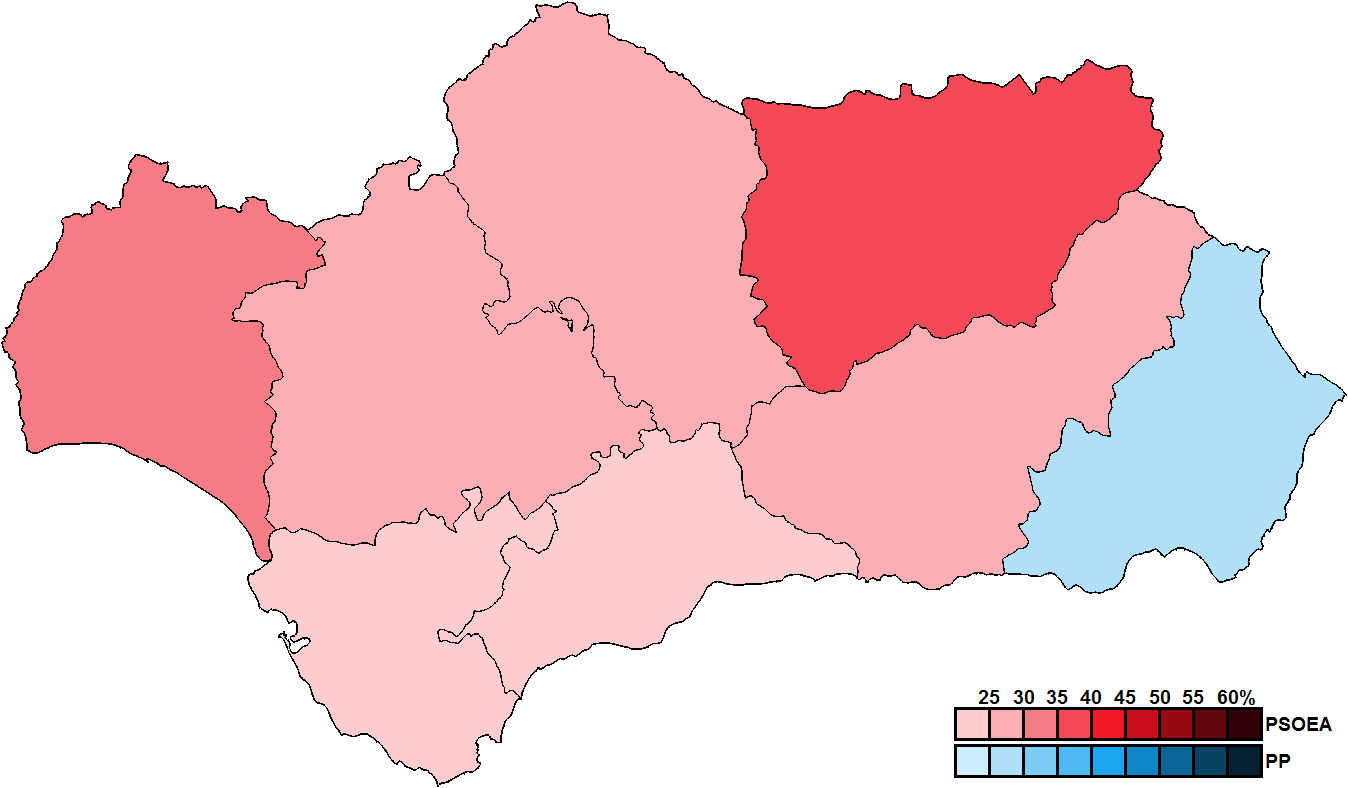
- Constituency results map for the Parliament of Andalusia
President before election
Susana Díaz
PSOE–A
President after election
Juanma Moreno
PP

A regional election was held in Andalusia on 2 December 2018 to elect the 11th Parliament of the autonomous community. All 109 seats in the Parliament were up for election.

As a result of the previous election, the Spanish Socialist Workers' Party of Andalusia (PSOE–A) was able to retain power after obtaining confidence and supply support from Citizens (Cs), with such alliance enduring President Susana Díaz's defeat in the 2017 PSOE leadership election. The PSOE–Cs agreement broke up in September 2018 after Cs withdrew their support from Díaz's government, prompting Díaz to announce the Parliament's dissolution on 8 October and call a snap election for 2 December 2018.

Registered turnout was the second lowest in any Andalusian regional election, only behind that of 1990. The PSOE–A remained the most voted party but suffered an unforeseen setback, dropping from 47 to 33 seats. A far-right party, Vox, gained parliamentary representation in a regional parliament in Spain for the first time since the country's transition to democracy, benefiting from a collapse in the People's Party (PP) vote which saw it nearly tied in votes with Cs. For the first time in the electoral history of Andalusia, right-of-centre parties commanded an absolute majority of seats in the Parliament of Andalusia, allowing a non-Socialist government to take power in the region after 36 years of uninterrupted PSOE rule.

Subsequently, PP and Cs formed a coalition government with Vox support, electing Juanma Moreno as its president. This cooperation between the centre-right and the far-right (including a centrist conservative-liberal party which had supported a center-left government in the prior Andalusian parliament) was widely seen as breaking the cordon sanitaire that most mainstream parties in other European countries had maintained up until that time against parties like the Front National (France), AfD (Germany) or the Sweden Democrats, while paving the way for similar agreements between all three PP, Cs and Vox being reached in other autonomous communities and municipalities following the 2019 local and regional elections.

== Overview ==
Under the 2007 Statute of Autonomy, the Parliament of Andalusia was the unicameral legislature of the homonymous autonomous community, having legislative power in devolved matters, as well as the ability to grant or withdraw confidence from a regional president. The electoral and procedural rules were supplemented by national law provisions.

=== Date ===
The term of the Parliament of Andalusia expired four years after the date of its previous election, unless it was dissolved earlier. The election decree was required to be issued no later than 25 days before the scheduled expiration date of parliament and published on the following day in the Official Gazette of the Regional Government of Andalusia (BOJA), with election day taking place 54 days after the decree's publication (barring any date within from 1 July to 31 August). The previous election was held on 22 March 2015, which meant that the chamber's term would have expired on 22 March 2019. The election decree was required to be published in the BOJA no later than 26 February 2019, setting the latest possible date for election day on 21 April 2019.

The regional president had the prerogative to dissolve the Parliament of Andalusia at any given time and call a snap election, provided that no motion of no confidence was in process and that dissolution did not occur before one year after a previous one. In the event of an investiture process failing to elect a regional president within a two-month period from the first ballot, the Parliament was to be automatically dissolved and a fresh election called.

Throughout the first half of 2018, opinion settled among opposition parties that Díaz would call a snap election by October–November 2018, several months ahead of schedule. On 3 July, the ABC newspaper hypothesized on the actual chances of an early election taking place, dubbing it as a real possibility after considering that Díaz would seek to capitalize on the Spanish Socialist Workers' Party (PSOE)'s growing popularity in opinion polls, hoping to benefit from the disarray within the People's Party (PP) ranks—resulting from its national leadership contest—and Citizens (Cs)'s inability to react after the motion of no confidence which ousted Mariano Rajoy's government from power. During the summer of 2018, it transpired that Susana Díaz was considering to call an autumn election for 28 October. In early September it was commented that the date would be delayed until either 18 or 25 November, After Cs officially withdrew its confidence and supply support from the government on 7 September, leaving the PSOE in minority, 2 or 16 December became the more likely dates for the election to be held. On 8 October, Susana Díaz announced the Parliament's dissolution and confirmed 2 December as the regional election date.

The Parliament of Andalusia was officially dissolved on 9 October 2018 with the publication of the corresponding decree in the BOJA, setting election day for 2 December and scheduling for the chamber to reconvene on 27 December.

=== Electoral system ===
Voting for the Parliament was based on universal suffrage, comprising all Spanish nationals over 18 years of age, registered in Andalusia and with full political rights, provided that they had not been deprived of the right to vote by a final sentence, nor were legally incapacitated. Additionally, non-resident citizens were required to apply for voting, a system known as "begged" voting (Spanish: Voto rogado).

The Parliament of Andalusia had a minimum of 109 seats, with electoral provisions fixing its size at that number. All were elected in eight multi-member constituencies—corresponding to the provinces of Almería, Cádiz, Córdoba, Granada, Huelva, Jaén, Málaga and Seville, each of which was assigned an initial minimum of eight seats and the remaining 45 distributed in proportion to population (with the number of seats in each province not exceeding two times that of any other)—using the D'Hondt method and closed-list proportional voting, with a three percent-threshold of valid votes (including blank ballots) in each constituency. The use of this electoral method resulted in a higher effective threshold depending on district magnitude and vote distribution.

As a result of the aforementioned allocation, each Parliament constituency was entitled the following seats:

| Seats | Constituencies |
|---|---|
| 18 | Seville |
| 17 | Málaga |
| 15 | Cádiz |
| 13 | Granada |
| 12 | Almería, Córdoba |
| 11 | Huelva, Jaén |

The law did not provide for by-elections to fill vacant seats; instead, any vacancies arising after the proclamation of candidates and during the legislative term were filled by the next candidates on the party lists or, when required, by designated substitutes.

=== Outgoing parliament ===
The table below shows the composition of the parliamentary groups in the chamber at the time of dissolution.

Parliamentary composition in October 2018
| Groups | Parties | Legislators | |
| Groups | Parties | Seats | Total |
|---|---|---|---|
| Socialist Parliamentary Group | PSOE–A | 47 | 47 |
| Andalusian People's Parliamentary Group | PP | 33 | 33 |
| We Can Andalusia Parliamentary Group | Podemos | 14 | 15 |
| We Can Andalusia Parliamentary Group | Equo | 1 | 15 |
| Citizens Parliamentary Group | Cs | 8 | 8 |
| United Left/The Greens Parliamentary Group | IULV–CA | 5 | 5 |
| Non-Inscrits | INDEP | 1 (Note: Carmen Prieto, former Cs legislator.) | 1 |

== Parties and candidates ==
The electoral law allowed for parties and federations registered in the interior ministry, alliances and groupings of electors to present lists of candidates. Parties and federations intending to form an alliance were required to inform the relevant electoral commission within 10 days of the election call, whereas groupings of electors needed to secure the signature of at least one percent of the electorate in the constituencies for which they sought election, disallowing electors from signing for more than one list. Additionally, a balanced composition of men and women was required in the electoral lists through the use of a zipper system.

Below is a list of the main parties and alliances which contested the election:

| Candidacy | Parties and alliances | Leading candidate | Ideology | Previous result | | Gov. | Ref. |
| Candidacy | Parties and alliances | Leading candidate | Ideology | Vote % | Seats | Gov. | Ref. |
|---|---|---|---|---|---|---|---|
| PSOE–A | List: Spanish Socialist Workers' Party of Andalusia (PSOE–A) | Susana Díaz | Social democracy | 35.4% | 47 | Yes | |
| PP | List: People's Party (PP) | Juanma Moreno | Conservatism; Christian democracy | 26.7% | 33 | No | |
| Adelante; Andalucía | List: We Can (Podemos); United Left/The Greens–Assembly for Andalusia (IULV–CA) – Communist Party of Andalusia (PCA) – The Dawn Marxist Organization (La Aurora (OM)) – Republican Left (IR) – Open Left (IzAb) – Feminist Party of Spain (PFE); Andalusian Left (IzA); Andalusian Spring (Primavera Andaluza) | Teresa Rodríguez | Andalusian nationalism Left-wing populism Direct democracy | 21.7% | 20 | No | |
| Cs | List: Citizens–Party of the Citizenry (Cs) | Juan Marín | Liberalism | 9.3% | 9 | No | |
| Vox | List: Vox (Vox) | Francisco Serrano | Right-wing populism Ultranationalism; National conservatism | 0.5% | 0 | No | |
| Equo– Iniciativa | List: Equo (Equo); Andalusian People's Initiative (IdPA) | Carmen Molina | Green politics | Contested in alliance (Note: Equo (0 seats) contested the 2015 election in alliance with Podemos.) | | No | |

== Campaign ==
=== Timetable ===
The key dates are listed below (all times are CET) instead):

- 8 October: The election decree is issued with the countersign of the president, after deliberation in the Council of Government.
- 9 October: Formal dissolution of parliament and start of prohibition period on the inauguration of public works, services or projects.
- 12 October: Initial constitution of provincial and zone electoral commissions with judicial members.
- 15 October: Division of constituencies into polling sections and stations.
- 19 October: Deadline for parties and federations to report on their electoral alliances.
- 22 October: Deadline for electoral register consultation for the purpose of possible corrections.
- 29 October: Deadline for parties, federations, alliances, and groupings of electors to present electoral lists.
- 31 October: Publication of submitted electoral lists in the Official Gazette of the Regional Government of Andalusia (BOJA).
- 3 November: Deadline for non-resident citizens (electors residing abroad (CERA) and citizens temporarily absent from Spain) to apply for voting.
- 5 November: Official proclamation of validly submitted electoral lists.
- 6 November: Publication of proclaimed electoral lists in the BOJA.
- 7 November: Deadline for the selection of polling station members by sortition.
- 15 November: Deadline for the appointment of non-judicial members to provincial and zone electoral commissions.
- 16 November: Official start of electoral campaigning.
- 22 November: Deadline to apply for postal voting.
- 27 November: Start of legal ban on electoral opinion polling publication; deadline for CERA citizens to vote by mail.
- 28 November: Deadline for postal and temporarily absent voting.
- 30 November: Last day of electoral campaigning; deadline for CERA voting.
- 1 December: Official election silence ("reflection day").
- 2 December: Election day (polling stations open at 9 am and close at 8 pm or once voters present in a queue at/outside the polling station at 8 pm have cast their vote); provisional vote counting.
- 5 December: Start of general vote counting, including CERA votes.
- 8 December: Deadline for the general vote counting.
- 17 December: Deadline for the proclamation of elected members.
- 27 December: Deadline for the reconvening of parliament (date determined by the election decree, which for the 2018 election was set for 27 December).
- 26 January: Deadline for the publication of definitive election results in the BOJA.

=== Party slogans ===
| Party or alliance | Original slogan | English translation | Ref. |
|---|---|---|---|
| PSOE–A | « Con Susana » « Más Andalucía » | "With Susana" "More Andalusia" | |
| PP | « Juanma Moreno, Garantía de Cambio » | "Juanma Moreno, Guarantee of Change" | |
| Adelante | « ¡Adelante!, Salimos a Ganar Andalucía » | "Forward! We come out to Win Andalusia" | |
| Cs | « Ahora Sí, Ciudadanos » | "Now Yes, Citizens" | |
| Equo–Iniciativa | « Andalucía más que verde » | "Green-enough Andalusia" | |
| Vox | « Andalucía por España » | "Andalusia for Spain" | |

=== Debates ===
2018 Andalusian regional election debates
| Date | Organizer(s) | Moderator(s) | P Present (Note: Denotes a main invitee attending the event.) S Surrogate (Note: Denotes a main invitee not attending the event, sending a surrogate in their place.) NI Not invited I Invited A Absent invitee | | | | | |
| Date | Organizer(s) | Moderator(s) | PSOE–A | PP | Adelante | Cs | Audience | Ref. |
|---|---|---|---|---|---|---|---|---|
| 19 November | RTVA | Mabel Mata | P Díaz | P Moreno | P Rodríguez | P Marín | 13.0% (431,000) | |
| 26 November | RTVE | Pilar García Muñiz | P Díaz | P Moreno | P Rodríguez | P Marín | 12.3% (395,000) | |

== Opinion polls ==
The tables below list opinion polling results in reverse chronological order, showing the most recent first and using the dates when the survey fieldwork was done, as opposed to the date of publication. Where the fieldwork dates are unknown, the date of publication is given instead. The highest percentage figure in each polling survey is displayed with its background shaded in the leading party's colour. If a tie ensues, this is applied to the figures with the highest percentages. The "Lead" column on the right shows the percentage-point difference between the parties with the highest percentages in a poll.

=== Graphical summary ===
Local regression trend line of poll results from 22 March 2015 to 2 December 2018, with each line corresponding to a political party.

=== Voting intention estimates ===
The table below lists weighted voting intention estimates. Refusals are generally excluded from the party vote percentages, while question wording and the treatment of "don't know" responses and those not intending to vote may vary between polling organisations. When available, seat projections determined by the polling organisations are displayed below (or in place of) the percentages in a smaller font; 55 seats were required for an absolute majority in the Parliament of Andalusia.

Color key:

Poll conducted after legal ban on opinion polls

| Polling firm/Commissioner | Fieldwork date | Sample size | Turnout | PSOE–A | PP | Podemos | Cs | IULV | PA | PACMA | Vox | Adelante Andalucía | AxSí | Lead |
|---|---|---|---|---|---|---|---|---|---|---|---|---|---|---|
| 2018 regional election | 2 Dec 2018 | —N/a | 56.6 | 27.9; 33 | 20.7; 26 | (Note: Within Adelante Andalucía.) | 18.3; 21 | | – | 1.9; 0 | 11.0; 12 | 16.2; 17 | 0.6; 0 | 7.2 |
| SocioMétrica/El Español | 1 Dec 2018 | ? | ? | ? 37/40 | ? 24/26 | | ? 19/22 | | – | – | ? 5/7 | ? 21/23 | – | ? |
| ElectoPanel/Electomanía | 29–30 Nov 2018 | ? | ? | 32.0; 39 | 19.6; 24 | | 18.4; 19 | | – | 0.6; 0 | 6.3; 6 | 19.6; 21 | 0.6; 0 | 12.4 |
| GAD3/ABC | 19–30 Nov 2018 | 4,800 | ? | 30.6; 36/38 | 19.7; 22/26 | | 17.6; 19/21 | | – | – | 10.2; 8/10 | 18.4; 18/20 | – | 10.9 |
| ElectoPanel/Electomanía | 28–29 Nov 2018 | ? | ? | 32.0; 39 | 19.4; 23 | | 18.7; 19 | | – | 0.6; 0 | 6.0; 5 | 19.8; 23 | 0.7; 0 | 12.2 |
| ElectoPanel/Electomanía | 27–28 Nov 2018 | ? | ? | 32.1; 40 | 19.2; 22 | | 18.8; 20 | | – | 0.5; 0 | 5.8; 4 | 20.0; 23 | 0.7; 0 | 12.1 |
| PSOE | 27 Nov 2018 | ? | ? | 33.0; 41/43 | 22.0; 25 | | 15.0; 17/18 | | – | – | 5.0; 3 | 20.0; 21/22 | – | 11.0 |
| ElectoPanel/Electomanía | 26–27 Nov 2018 | ? | ? | 32.2; 40 | 19.6; 23 | | 18.2; 19 | | – | 0.5; 0 | 5.8; 4 | 20.1; 23 | 0.8; 0 | 12.1 |
| GAD3/ABC | 19–26 Nov 2018 | 2,900 | ? | 32.6; 41/43 | 20.7; 24/25 | | 19.3; 20/22 | | – | – | 6.8; 3/4 | 17.6; 17/19 | – | 11.9 |
| ElectoPanel/Electomanía | 20–25 Nov 2018 | 1,100 | ? | 32.4; 38/43 | 19.8; 20/25 | | 18.6; 17/23 | | – | 0.5; 0 | 5.4; 1/3 | 19.7; 18/23 | 0.8; 0 | 12.6 |
| PP | 24 Nov 2018 | ? | ? | ? 40/41 | ? 25 | | ? 20/21 | | – | – | ? 4 | ? 20/22 | – | ? |
| SyM Consulting | 21–23 Nov 2018 | 5,300 | 63.5 | 31.9; 36/39 | 23.6; 25/31 | | 13.9; 13/15 | | – | – | 4.1; 1/2 | 21.9; 26/29 | – | 8.3 |
| Deimos Estadística | 20–23 Nov 2018 | 1,200 | ? | 36.0; 44/48 | 24.9; 30/33 | | 13.2; 13/16 | | – | 1.7; 0/2 | 2.8; 0/3 | 18.2; 19/22 | 0.6; 0 | 11.1 |
| NC Report/La Razón | 19–23 Nov 2018 | 1,000 | 61.1 | 34.5; 41/43 | 22.3; 26/29 | | 14.8; 15/17 | | – | – | 3.8; 0/2 | 21.4; 23/25 | – | 12.2 |
| Celeste-Tel/eldiario.es | 19–23 Nov 2018 | 1,000 | ? | 35.8; 43/45 | 21.6; 25/27 | | 15.0; 16/17 | | – | – | 3.2; 0/1 | 21.2; 23/24 | – | 14.2 |
| SocioMétrica/El Español | 16–23 Nov 2018 | 1,200 | ? | 32.8; 37/40 | 22.7; 26/29 | | 16.2; 17/20 | | – | 1.4; 0 | 6.5; 3/5 | 18.6; 20/22 | – | 10.1 |
| Top Position | 19–21 Nov 2018 | 1,200 | ? | 32.3; 35/45 | 20.5; 20/26 | | 17.8; 15/23 | | – | – | 6.1; 1/3 | 21.3; 21/29 | – | 11.0 |
| InvyMark/laSexta | 17–21 Nov 2018 | ? | ? | 33.0; 41 | 22.2; 26 | | 19.7; 20 | | – | – | 3.2; 1 | 19.5; 21 | – | 10.8 |
| Sigma Dos/El Mundo | 16–20 Nov 2018 | 2,500 | ? | 30.3; 36/40 | 20.8; 24/27 | | 20.2; 21/24 | | – | – | 5.9; 3/4 | 19.0; 19/20 | – | 9.5 |
| 40dB/El País | 12–19 Nov 2018 | 1,204 | ? | 32.1; 39/42 | 20.0; 22/26 | | 18.0; 19/22 | | – | 3.1; 0 | 4.3; 0/4 | 19.0; 22/24 | – | 12.1 |
| Celeste-Tel | 6–19 Nov 2018 | 2,400 | 62.0 | 35.9; 43/45 | 21.8; 26/27 | | 14.6; 15/17 | | – | – | 3.1; 0/1 | 21.1; 23/24 | – | 14.1 |
| KeyData/Público | 18 Nov 2018 | ? | 64.6 | 33.4; 41 | 21.6; 25 | | 20.6; 23 | | – | – | – | 18.3; 20 | – | 11.8 |
| ElectoPanel/Electomanía | 13–18 Nov 2018 | 1,100 | ? | 33.3; 40/44 | 18.0; 19/23 | | 20.2; 20/25 | | – | 0.6; 0 | 4.4; 0/1 | 19.6; 19/24 | 0.8; 0 | 13.1 |
| NC Report/La Razón | 12–16 Nov 2018 | 1,000 | 60.2 | 34.6; 40/43 | 22.8; 26/28 | | 15.5; 16/18 | | – | – | 2.0; 0 | 21.1; 23/24 | – | 11.8 |
| SocioMétrica/El Español | 9–16 Nov 2018 | 1,200 | ? | 30.6; 36/38 | 21.2; 24/26 | | 19.0; 21/23 | | – | 1.3; 0 | 5.6; 1/3 | 20.4; 22/24 | – | 9.4 |
| Sigma Dos/Antena 3 | 12–15 Nov 2018 | ? | ? | 32.0; 38/41 | 22.2; 26/29 | | 19.2; 22/23 | | – | – | 3.6; 0 | 18.6; 19/20 | – | 9.8 |
| SocioMétrica/El Español | 8–15 Nov 2018 | 1,200 | ? | 29.3 | 21.8 | | 19.2 | | – | – | – | 20.1 | – | 7.5 |
| Metroscopia/Grupo Joly | 4–15 Nov 2018 | 4,000 | 64 | 30.9; 37/40 | 20.1; 24 | | 21.2; 22/24 | | – | – | 3.1; 0 | 20.9; 23/24 | – | 9.7 |
| GAD3/ABC | 8–14 Nov 2018 | 1,803 | ? | 33.5; 41/42 | 22.3; 25/27 | | 19.5; 22/25 | | – | 1.7; 0 | 3.6; 0/1 | 17.4; 17/19 | – | 11.2 |
| SocioMétrica/El Español | 7–14 Nov 2018 | 1,200 | ? | 29.0 | 20.8 | | 20.0 | | – | – | – | 20.3 | – | 8.2 |
| SocioMétrica/El Español | 6–13 Nov 2018 | 1,200 | ? | 29.6 | 20.6 | | 21.3 | | – | – | – | 19.0 | – | 8.3 |
| SocioMétrica/El Español | 5–12 Nov 2018 | 1,200 | ? | 30.0 | 20.5 | | 22.0 | | – | – | – | 18.8 | – | 8.0 |
| ElectoPanel/Electomanía | 6–11 Nov 2018 | 1,100 | ? | 32.6; 39/41 | 19.6; 21/25 | | 20.2; 19/25 | | – | 0.5; 0 | 3.4; 0/1 | 20.2; 20/24 | 0.9; 0 | 12.4 |
| SocioMétrica/El Español | 30 Oct–6 Nov 2018 | 1,100 | ? | 30.2; 36/38 | 20.4; 24/26 | | 22.4; 24/26 | | – | 1.2; 0 | 4.2; 0/2 | 18.6; 20/22 | – | 7.8 |
| SW Demoscopia/Grupo Viva | 18 Oct–6 Nov 2018 | 3,400 | ? | 30.4; 39/41 | 19.8; 24/26 | | 20.6; 25/27 | | – | – | 4.2; 0/2 | 17.5; 19/21 | 2.5; 0/1 | 9.8 |
| PSOE | 4 Nov 2018 | ? | ? | ? 45 | ? 23 | | ? 24 | | – | – | – | ? 17 | – | ? |
| ElectoPanel/Electomanía | 30 Oct–4 Nov 2018 | 1,100 | ? | 32.4; 38/41 | 19.3; 20/24 | | 20.9; 22/25 | | – | 0.5; 0 | 3.3; 0/1 | 19.9; 20/24 | 1.0; 0 | 11.5 |
| CIS (Kiko Llaneras) (Note: Alternative projection based on CIS raw data.) | 15–31 Oct 2018 | 4,895 | ? | 33.1 | 23.7 | | 18.0 | | – | – | 2.5 | 20.5 | – | 9.4 |
| CIS | 15–31 Oct 2018 | 4,895 | ? | 37.4; 45/47 | 18.7; 20/22 | | 18.6; 20/22 | | – | 2.2; 0 | 3.2; 1 | 19.3; 20 | – | 18.1 |
| Celeste-Tel/eldiario.es | 24–30 Oct 2018 | 1,000 | ? | 36.7; 44/46 | 23.8; 28/30 | | 13.6; 12/13 | | – | – | – | 19.3; 22/23 | – | 12.9 |
| ElectoPanel/Electomanía | 23–28 Oct 2018 | 1,100 | ? | 32.7; 41 | 20.9; 25 | | 19.9; 21 | | – | 0.5; 0 | 2.7; 0 | 19.1; 22 | 1.1; 0 | 11.8 |
| NC Report/La Razón | 15–18 Oct 2018 | 1,000 | 59.0 | 36.6; 45 | 23.4; 28 | | 14.0; 14 | | – | – | – | 18.6; 22 | – | 13.2 |
| IMOP/El Confidencial | 15–17 Oct 2018 | 1,019 | ? | 29.8; 35 | 20.5; 25 | | 22.3; 24 | | – | – | – | 21.7; 25 | – | 7.5 |
| JM&A/Público | 14 Oct 2018 | ? | ? | 37.7; 46 | 20.7; 25 | | 18.3; 20 | | – | – | – | 17.1; 18 | – | 17.0 |
| Aurea Project/ESdiario | 18 Sep–8 Oct 2018 | 3,200 | ? | 32.8; 37/40 | 23.6; 29/32 | | 18.5; 20/22 | | – | 2.3; 0 | 1.0; 0 | 19.0; 19/22 | – | 9.2 |
| ElectoPanel/Electomanía | 16–18 Sep 2018 | ? | ? | 32.0; 39 | 20.6; 24 | | 20.9; 22 | | – | 0.8; 0 | 1.4; 0 | 21.0; 24 | 0.9; 0 | 11.0 |
| SocioMétrica/El Español | 17 Sep 2018 | 1,100 | ? | 27.1; 32/34 | 21.6; 25/27 | | 22.9; 25/27 | | – | 1.1; 0 | 1.4; 0 | 21.0; 23/25 | 1.9; 0 | 4.2 |
| SW Demoscopia/Grupo Viva | 6–20 Jun 2018 | 3,519 | ? | 38.1; 45/48 | 19.8; 21/24 | (Note: Within Unidos Podemos.) | 21.5; 22/25 | | – | – | – | 14.8; 14/17 | – | 16.6 |
| ElectoPanel/Electomanía | 3–7 Jun 2018 | ? | ? | 34.4; 42 | 21.6; 27 | | 17.6; 16 | | – | – | – | 19.9; 24 | – | 12.8 |
| SyM Consulting | 25–27 May 2018 | 4,650 | 64.9 | 31.5; 36/41 | 24.2; 28/33 | 18.1; 18/21 | 13.1; 14/16 | 7.5; 5/6 | – | – | – | – | – | 7.3 |
| IDR.UGR/Podemos | 25 Jan–7 Mar 2018 | 3,200 | ? | 32.3; 39 | 20.8; 28 | 13.8; 17 | 17.5; 19 | 6.9; 6 | – | – | – | – | – | 11.5 |
| NC Report | 25 Feb 2018 | 2,500 | ? | 33.3; 42/43 | 25.6; 33/34 | 14.6; 14 | 13.9; 14 | 8.0; 5 | – | – | – | – | – | 7.7 |
| Deimos Estadística | 19–23 Feb 2018 | 1,287 | ? | 34.6; 44 | 25.4; 30 | 14.4; 12 | 19.7; 21 | 3.9; 2 | – | 1.7; 0 | – | – | – | 9.2 |
| SW Demoscopia/Grupo Viva | 1–19 Feb 2018 | 6,000 | ? | 36.8; 43/46 | 22.5; 24/27 | | 19.3; 22/24 | | – | – | – | 16.5; 15/18 | – | 14.3 |
| OCG | 15 Jan–18 Feb 2018 | 1,400 | ? | 32.1; 40 | 27.4; 35 | | 13.3; 16 | | – | – | – | 14.9; 18 | – | 4.7 |
| CADPEA/UGR | 11 Jan–1 Feb 2018 | 1,200 | 60.1 | 34.1 | 18.3 | 10.5 | 19.8 | 8.3 | – | – | – | – | – | 14.3 |
| GAD3/ABC | 19–23 Jan 2018 | 800 | 63 | 31.5; 41 | 23.0; 28 | 10.0; 10 | 23.0; 26 | 6.5; 4 | – | – | – | – | – | 8.5 |
| Celeste-Tel | 4–18 Dec 2017 | 2,450 | 60.1 | 35.9; 48 | 24.8; 31 | 13.6; 13 | 11.8; 13 | 6.4; 4 | – | – | – | – | – | 11.1 |
| Celeste-Tel | 3–17 Jul 2017 | 2,450 | 59.8 | 35.8; 47 | 25.5; 31 | 15.2; 16 | 9.9; 11 | 6.6; 4 | – | – | – | – | – | 10.3 |
| NC Report/La Razón | 6–11 Mar 2017 | 1,200 | 57.7 | 34.9; 45/46 | 28.1; 34/35 | 14.5; 14/15 | 9.7; 9/10 | 5.1; 3/4 | – | – | – | – | – | 6.8 |
| Celeste-Tel | 15–24 Feb 2017 | 2,400 | ? | 36.6; 47 | 26.5; 35 | 14.2; 14 | 9.8; 10 | 5.2; 3 | – | – | – | – | – | 10.1 |
| Deimos Estadística | 11–19 Feb 2017 | 1,233 | ? | 39.1; 49/53 | 27.3; 31/33 | 14.8; 14/15 | 8.2; 5/7 | 6.3; 2/4 | – | – | – | – | – | 11.8 |
| Bevents/PP | 6–16 Feb 2017 | 1,200 | ? | 30.9; 38/39 | 31.7; 39/40 | 14.7; 14 | 13.1; 13 | 6.6; 4 | – | – | – | – | – | 0.8 |
| Celeste-Tel | 12–23 Dec 2016 | 3,600 | 57.4 | 34.4; 43/45 | 27.6; 34/35 | 15.8; 17 | 9.4; 10 | 5.5; 3/4 | – | – | – | – | – | 6.8 |
| CADPEA/UGR | 3 Nov–12 Dec 2016 | 3,200 | 62.8 | 28.6 | 26.2 | 17.0 | 12.1 | 5.7 | – | – | – | – | – | 2.4 |
| 2016 general election | 26 Jun 2016 | —N/a | 66.1 | 31.2 (37) | 33.5 (41) | | 13.6 (13) | | – | 1.2 (0) | 0.2 (0) | 18.6 (18) | – | 2.3 |
| Deimos Estadística | 22–25 Feb 2016 | 80,567 | ? | 33.7; 41 | 25.7; 30 | 18.1; 19 | 15.8; 17 | 4.3; 2 | – | – | – | – | – | 8.0 |
| CADPEA/UGR | 18 Jan–9 Feb 2016 | 1,200 | 72.3 | 32.1 | 25.3 | 17.2 | 13.0 | 8.0 | – | – | – | – | – | 6.8 |
| 2015 general election | 20 Dec 2015 | —N/a | 69.1 | 31.5 (39) | 29.1 (35) | 16.9 (17) | 13.8 (14) | 5.8 (4) | – | 0.9 (0) | 0.2 (0) | – | – | 2.4 |
| Celeste-Tel | 7–28 Sep 2015 | 1,200 | ? | 37.7; 48 | 25.8; 31 | 14.1; 14 | 12.0; 13 | 5.3; 3 | – | – | – | – | – | 11.9 |
| CADPEA/UGR | 29 Jun–18 Jul 2015 | 1,200 | 70.5 | 32.5 | 21.9 | 19.2 | 14.1 | 6.0 | – | – | – | – | – | 10.6 |
| Metroscopia/El País | 11–12 May 2015 | 1,000 | ? | 37.1 | 20.0 | 15.1 | 15.5 | 6.7 | – | – | – | – | – | 17.1 |
| 2015 regional election | 22 Mar 2015 | —N/a | 62.3 | 35.4; 47 | 26.7; 33 | 14.9; 15 | 9.3; 9 | 6.9; 5 | 1.5; 0 | 0.8; 0 | 0.5; 0 | – | – | 8.7 |

=== Voting preferences ===
The table below lists raw, unweighted voting preferences.

| Polling firm/Commissioner | Fieldwork date | Sample size | PSOE–A | PP | Podemos | Cs | IULV | PA | PACMA | Vox | Adelante Andalucía | AxSí | Question | X mark | Lead |
|---|---|---|---|---|---|---|---|---|---|---|---|---|---|---|---|
| 2018 regional election (Note: Does not include non-resident citizens.) | 2 Dec 2018 | —N/a | 16.0 | 11.9 | | 10.5 | | – | 1.1 | 6.3 | 9.3 | 0.3 | —N/a | 41.3 | 4.1 |
| SocioMétrica/El Español | 16–23 Nov 2018 | 1,200 | 18.1 | 11.9 | | 9.8 | | – | – | 3.8 | 6.5 | – | 33.2 | 13.1 | 6.2 |
| 40dB/El País | 12–19 Nov 2018 | 1,204 | 16.6 | 10.9 | | 10.9 | | – | 3.1 | 5.1 | 10.2 | – | 26.4 | 6.5 | 5.7 |
| Metroscopia/Grupo Joly | 4–15 Nov 2018 | 4,000 | 21.1 | 13.2 | | 16.4 | | – | – | 2.2 | 11.2 | – | – | – | 4.7 |
| SW Demoscopia/Grupo Viva | 18 Oct–6 Nov 2018 | 3,400 | 23.9 | 14.1 | | 15.0 | | – | – | 1.7 | 10.7 | 0.9 | – | – | 8.9 |
| CIS | 15–31 Oct 2018 | 4,895 | 22.2 | 9.8 | | 9.8 | | – | 1.0 | 1.6 | 9.2 | – | 29.6 | 11.4 | 12.4 |
| SocioMétrica/El Español | 17 Sep 2018 | 1,100 | 17.1 | 15.2 | | 15.2 | | – | 1.7 | 1.5 | 15.3 | 2.3 | 16.0 | 13.3 | 1.8 |
| IDR.UGR/Podemos | 25 Jan–7 Mar 2018 | 3,200 | 18.9 | 12.9 | 9.0 | 23.1 | 3.7 | – | – | – | – | – | – | – | 4.2 |
| SW Demoscopia/Grupo Viva | 1–19 Feb 2018 | 6,000 | 28.8 | 16.0 | | 16.3 | | – | – | – | 10.4 | 0.9 | – | – | 12.5 |
| GAD3/ABC | 19–23 Jan 2018 | 800 | 21.9 | 15.3 | 6.0 | 21.1 | 4.2 | – | – | – | – | – | – | – | 0.8 |
| CADPEA/UGR | 11 Jan–1 Feb 2018 | 1,200 | 16.6 | 10.3 | 4.0 | 21.5 | 4.8 | – | – | – | – | – | 23.9 | 9.4 | 4.9 |
| CADPEA/UGR | 3 Nov–12 Dec 2016 | 3,200 | 19.7 | 19.2 | 10.6 | 9.7 | 4.0 | – | – | – | – | – | 21.6 | 7.9 | 0.5 |
| 2016 general election | 26 Jun 2016 | —N/a | 21.1 | 22.6 | | 9.2 | | – | 0.8 | 0.1 | 12.5 | – | —N/a | 31.8 | 1.5 |
| CADPEA/UGR | 18 Jan–9 Feb 2016 | 1,200 | 21.8 | 20.0 | 9.7 | 12.3 | 6.6 | – | – | – | – | – | 17.1 | 6.8 | 1.8 |
| 2015 general election | 20 Dec 2015 | —N/a | 22.3 | 20.6 | 11.9 | 9.7 | 4.1 | – | 0.6 | 0.1 | – | – | —N/a | 28.7 | 1.7 |
| CADPEA/UGR | 29 Jun–18 Jul 2015 | 1,200 | 21.7 | 17.0 | 11.1 | 11.8 | 5.5 | 0.8 | – | – | – | – | 18.2 | 6.7 | 4.7 |
| 2015 regional election | 22 Mar 2015 | —N/a | 22.4 | 16.9 | 9.4 | 5.9 | 4.4 | 1.0 | 0.5 | 0.3 | – | – | —N/a | 36.1 | 5.5 |

=== Victory preferences ===
The table below lists opinion polling on the victory preferences for each party in the event of a regional election taking place.

| Polling firm/Commissioner | Fieldwork date | Sample size | PSOE–A | PP | Podemos | Cs | IULV | Vox | Adelante Andalucía | Other/ None | Question | Lead |
|---|---|---|---|---|---|---|---|---|---|---|---|---|
| CIS | 15–31 Oct 2018 | 4,895 | 27.3 | 12.3 | | 13.2 | | 1.6 | 11.9 | 4.9 | 28.7 | 14.1 |
| CADPEA/UGR | 11 Jan–1 Feb 2018 | 1,200 | 21.7 | 14.5 | 5.2 | 26.8 | 7.5 | – | – | 1.0 | 23.4 | 5.1 |
| Celeste-Tel | 4–18 Dec 2017 | 2,450 | 36.2 | 19.8 | 10.1 | 11.1 | 5.5 | – | – | – | – | 16.4 |
| Celeste-Tel | 3–17 Jul 2017 | 2,450 | 40.5 | 20.7 | 10.0 | 6.4 | 5.4 | – | – | – | – | 19.8 |
| Celeste-Tel | 15–24 Feb 2017 | 2,400 | 27.0 | 22.2 | 10.7 | 7.3 | – | – | – | – | – | 4.8 |
| CADPEA/UGR | 3 Nov–12 Dec 2016 | 3,200 | 25.2 | 21.8 | 10.5 | 11.6 | 6.0 | – | – | 6.8 | 18.1 | 3.4 |
| CADPEA/UGR | 18 Jan–9 Feb 2016 | 1,200 | 24.8 | 21.9 | 10.9 | 15.0 | 7.3 | – | – | 2.5 | 17.8 | 2.9 |

=== Victory likelihood ===
The table below lists opinion polling on the perceived likelihood of victory for each party in the event of a regional election taking place.

| Polling firm/Commissioner | Fieldwork date | Sample size | PSOE–A | PP | Podemos | Cs | IULV | Vox | Adelante Andalucía | Other/ None | Question | Lead |
|---|---|---|---|---|---|---|---|---|---|---|---|---|
| CIS | 15–31 Oct 2018 | 4,895 | 65.1 | 8.5 | | 1.9 | | 0.1 | 1.4 | 0.1 | 22.8 | 56.6 |
| CADPEA/UGR | 11 Jan–1 Feb 2018 | 1,200 | 76.3 | 8.4 | 0.3 | 4.7 | 0.2 | – | – | 0.1 | 10.1 | 67.9 |
| Celeste-Tel | 15–24 Feb 2017 | 2,400 | 32.2 | 23.9 | 5.0 | 3.1 | – | – | – | – | – | 8.3 |
| CADPEA/UGR | 3 Nov–12 Dec 2016 | 3,200 | 68.1 | 17.8 | 1.3 | 0.9 | 0.2 | – | – | 1.2 | 10.5 | 50.3 |
| CADPEA/UGR | 18 Jan–9 Feb 2016 | 1,200 | 83.4 | 5.4 | 2.2 | 0.5 | 0.4 | – | – | 0.2 | 7.9 | 78.0 |

=== Preferred President ===
The table below lists opinion polling on leader preferences to become president of the Regional Government of Andalusia.

| Polling firm/Commissioner | Fieldwork date | Sample size | | | | | | Other/ None/ Not care | Question | Lead |
| Polling firm/Commissioner | Fieldwork date | Sample size | Díaz PSOE–A | Moreno PP | Marín Cs | Serrano Vox | Rodríguez AA | Other/ None/ Not care | Question | Lead |
|---|---|---|---|---|---|---|---|---|---|---|
| SocioMétrica/El Español | 16–23 Nov 2018 | 1,200 | 30.7 | 22.4 | 19.4 | 3.1 | 24.4 | – | – | 6.3 |
| SocioMétrica/El Español | 15–22 Nov 2018 | 1,200 | 30.5 | 22.9 | 19.7 | 2.9 | 24.0 | – | – | 6.5 |
| InvyMark/laSexta | 17–21 Nov 2018 | ? | 33.3 | 17.5 | 20.3 | – | 19.0 | – | – | 13.0 |
| SocioMétrica/El Español | 14–21 Nov 2018 | 1,200 | 30.6 | 22.5 | 19.9 | 2.9 | 24.1 | – | – | 6.5 |
| SocioMétrica/El Español | 13–20 Nov 2018 | 1,200 | 29.4 | 23.6 | 20.5 | 2.6 | 23.9 | – | – | 5.5 |
| SocioMétrica/El Español | 12–19 Nov 2018 | 1,200 | 29.1 | 23.5 | 20.2 | 2.7 | 24.5 | – | – | 4.6 |
| SocioMétrica/El Español | 9–16 Nov 2018 | 1,200 | 28.7 | 24.0 | 20.0 | 2.7 | 24.6 | – | – | 4.1 |
| SocioMétrica/El Español | 8–15 Nov 2018 | 1,200 | 29.6 | 24.7 | 19.6 | 1.9 | 24.2 | – | – | 4.9 |
| SocioMétrica/El Español | 7–14 Nov 2018 | 1,200 | 29.4 | 25.6 | 19.3 | 1.0 | 24.7 | – | – | 3.8 |
| SocioMétrica/El Español | 6–13 Nov 2018 | 1,200 | 29.2 | 25.4 | 19.2 | 1.1 | 25.1 | – | – | 3.8 |
| SocioMétrica/El Español | 5–12 Nov 2018 | 1,200 | 28.7 | 25.6 | 19.7 | 0.5 | 25.5 | – | – | 3.1 |
| SocioMétrica/El Español | 2–9 Nov 2018 | 1,200 | 28.6 | 26.8 | 19.6 | – | 25.0 | – | – | 1.8 |
| CIS | 15–31 Oct 2018 | 4,895 | 25.8 | 9.0 | 7.8 | – | 9.8 | 12.9 | 34.6 | 16.0 |
| Aurea Project/ESdiario | 18 Sep–8 Oct 2018 | 3,200 | 26.0 | 27.6 | – | – | – | 25.4 | 21.0 | 1.6 |
| Aurea Project/ESdiario | 18 Sep–8 Oct 2018 | 3,200 | 21.3 | 19.3 | 11.7 | – | 6.0 | 8.3 | 33.3 | 2.0 |
| GAD3/ABC | 19–23 Jan 2018 | 800 | 21.4 | – | 12.4 | – | – | – | – | 9.0 |
| Celeste-Tel | 15–24 Feb 2017 | 2,400 | 41.9 | 24.7 | – | – | – | 29.9 | – | 17.2 |

== Voter turnout ==
The table below shows registered voter turnout during the election. Figures for election day do not include non-resident citizens, while final figures do.

| Province | Time (Election day) | | | | | | | | | Final | | |
| Province | 14:00 | | | 18:00 | | | 20:00 | | | Final | | |
| Province | 2015 | 2018 | +/– | 2015 | 2018 | +/– | 2015 | 2018 | +/– | 2015 | 2018 | +/– |
|---|---|---|---|---|---|---|---|---|---|---|---|---|
| Almería | 32.87% | 30.41% | −2.46 | 48.35% | 45.95% | −2.40 | 60.50% | 57.39% | −3.11 | 60.52% | 52.81% | −7.71 |
| Cádiz | 31.15% | 28.19% | −2.96 | 48.19% | 42.92% | −5.27 | 59.10% | 54.54% | −4.56 | 57.70% | 52.11% | −5.59 |
| Córdoba | 35.96% | 31.67% | −4.29 | 53.57% | 48.89% | −4.68 | 67.15% | 62.16% | −4.99 | 65.61% | 60.53% | −5.08 |
| Granada | 34.80% | 31.80% | −3.00 | 51.86% | 48.52% | −3.34 | 64.97% | 60.83% | −4.14 | 61.39% | 57.02% | −4.37 |
| Huelva | 30.80% | 26.89% | −3.91 | 46.88% | 42.62% | −4.26 | 61.06% | 55.54% | −5.52 | 60.11% | 54.58% | −5.53 |
| Jaén | 36.76% | 30.94% | −5.82 | 54.20% | 47.93% | −6.27 | 69.30% | 63.30% | −6.00 | 67.95% | 61.87% | −6.08 |
| Málaga | 32.22% | 29.84% | −2.38 | 49.61% | 45.64% | −3.97 | 61.08% | 56.63% | −4.45 | 58.92% | 54.22% | −4.70 |
| Seville | 35.91% | 29.88% | −6.03 | 54.83% | 48.05% | −6.78 | 67.22% | 60.59% | −6.63 | 65.99% | 59.24% | −6.75 |
| Total | 33.94% | 29.92% | –4.02 | 51.41% | 46.47% | –4.94 | 63.94% | 58.65% | –5.29 | 62.30% | 56.56% | –5.74 |

== Results ==
=== Overall ===
← Summary of the 2 December 2018 Parliament of Andalusia election results →
| Parties and alliances | Popular vote | | | Seats | |
| Parties and alliances | Votes | % | ±pp | Total | +/− |
|---|---|---|---|---|---|
| Spanish Socialist Workers' Party of Andalusia (PSOE–A) | 1,010,889 | 27.94 | −7.47 | 33 | −14 |
| People's Party (PP) | 750,778 | 20.75 | −5.99 | 26 | −7 |
| Citizens–Party of the Citizenry (Cs) | 661,371 | 18.28 | +9.00 | 21 | +12 |
| Forward–We Can–United Left–Spring–Andalusian Left (Adelante Andalucía)^{1} | 585,949 | 16.19 | −5.56 | 17 | −3 |
| Vox (Vox) | 396,607 | 10.96 | +10.50 | 12 | +12 |
| Animalist Party Against Mistreatment of Animals (PACMA) | 69,905 | 1.93 | +1.13 | 0 | ±0 |
| Andalusia by Herself (AxSí)^{2} | 22,032 | 0.61 | −0.91 | 0 | ±0 |
| Equo Greens–Andalusia Initiative (Equo–Iniciativa) | 15,172 | 0.42 | New | 0 | ±0 |
| Zero Cuts–For a Fairer World–Green Group (Recortes Cero–M+J–GV)^{3} | 7,207 | 0.20 | +0.06 | 0 | ±0 |
| Communist Party of the Andalusian People (PCPA) | 6,435 | 0.18 | +0.09 | 0 | ±0 |
| Union, Progress and Democracy (UPyD) | 6,384 | 0.18 | −1.75 | 0 | ±0 |
| Andalusian Nation (NA) | 5,015 | 0.14 | New | 0 | ±0 |
| United Free Citizens (CILUS) | 3,995 | 0.11 | −0.17 | 0 | ±0 |
| Independents for Huelva (IxH) | 3,995 | 0.11 | New | 0 | ±0 |
| Spanish Communist Workers' Party (PCOE) | 3,111 | 0.09 | New | 0 | ±0 |
| Blank Seats (EB) | 3,008 | 0.08 | +0.05 | 0 | ±0 |
| Spanish Phalanx of the CNSO (FE de las JONS) | 2,460 | 0.07 | −0.05 | 0 | ±0 |
| Republican Alternative (ALTER) | 1,987 | 0.05 | New | 0 | ±0 |
| Andalusian Convergence (CAnda) | 1,189 | 0.03 | New | 0 | ±0ˈ |
| Respect (Respeto) | 1,034 | 0.03 | New | 0 | ±0 |
| United Linares Independent Citizens (CILU–Linares) | 965 | 0.03 | New | 0 | ±0 |
| Revolutionary Anticapitalist Left (IZAR) | 654 | 0.02 | New | 0 | ±0 |
| To Solution (Soluciona) | 500 | 0.01 | New | 0 | ±0 |
| Connect Andalusia (ConecAnd) | 456 | 0.01 | New | 0 | ±0 |
| United and Socialists+ for Democracy (Unidos SI–DEF) | 326 | 0.01 | New | 0 | ±0 |
| Andalusian Solidary Independent Republican Party (RISA) | 228 | 0.01 | +0.01 | 0 | ±0 |
| Blank ballots | 56,939 | 1.57 | +0.20 | | |
| Total | 3,618,591 | | | 109 | ±0 |
| Valid votes | 3,618,591 | 97.80 | −1.18 | | |
| Invalid votes | 81,388 | 2.20 | +1.18 | | |
| Votes cast / turnout | 3,699,979 | 56.56 | −5.74 | | |
| Abstentions | 2,842,097 | 43.44 | +5.74 | | |
| Registered voters | 6,542,076 | | | | |
Sources
Footnotes: ^{1} Forward–We Can–United Left–Spring–Andalusian Left results are compared to the combined totals of We Can and United Left/The Greens–Assembly for Andalusia in the 2015 election.; ^{2} Andalusia by Herself results are compared to Andalusian Party totals in the 2015 election.; ^{3} Zero Cuts–For a Fairer World–Green Group results are compared to the combined totals of Zero Cuts and For a Fairer World in the 2015 election.

Popular vote
| PSOE–A | 27.94% |
| PP | 20.75% |
| Cs | 18.28% |
| Adelante | 16.19% |
| Vox | 10.96% |
| PACMA | 1.93% |
| Others | 2.38% |
| Blank ballots | 1.57% |

Seats
| PSOE–A | 30.28% |
| PP | 23.85% |
| Cs | 19.27% |
| Adelante | 15.60% |
| Vox | 11.01% |

=== Distribution by constituency ===
| Constituency | PSOE–A | | PP | | Cs | | Adelante | | Vox | |
| Constituency | % | S | % | S | % | S | % | S | % | S |
|---|---|---|---|---|---|---|---|---|---|---|
| Almería | 25.9 | 3 | 27.2 | 4 | 16.3 | 2 | 9.7 | 1 | 16.8 | 2 |
| Cádiz | 23.8 | 4 | 17.6 | 3 | 20.9 | 3 | 19.2 | 3 | 11.2 | 2 |
| Córdoba | 29.2 | 4 | 21.9 | 3 | 17.6 | 2 | 16.8 | 2 | 9.2 | 1 |
| Granada | 26.9 | 4 | 23.1 | 3 | 18.4 | 3 | 15.1 | 2 | 11.4 | 1 |
| Huelva | 31.6 | 4 | 22.7 | 3 | 16.3 | 2 | 14.3 | 1 | 8.3 | 1 |
| Jaén | 35.4 | 4 | 23.2 | 3 | 15.9 | 2 | 12.2 | 1 | 8.7 | 1 |
| Málaga | 24.2 | 4 | 22.6 | 4 | 19.8 | 4 | 15.7 | 3 | 11.5 | 2 |
| Seville | 30.0 | 6 | 16.5 | 3 | 17.8 | 3 | 18.9 | 4 | 10.7 | 2 |
| Total | 27.9 | 33 | 20.7 | 26 | 18.3 | 21 | 16.2 | 17 | 11.0 | 12 |

=== Analysis ===
As a result of the election, the ruling Spanish Socialist Workers' Party of Andalusia (PSOE–A) suffered a severe setback, plummeting in traditional strongholds where abstention rates skyrocketed and underperforming all opinion polls published throughout the campaign. Together with the left-wing Forward Andalusia (AA) alliance, which failed to garner the combined support of Podemos and United Left (IULV–CA) at the 2015 election, the combined left-from-centre bloc fell five seats short of a majority, putting the PSOE–A at risk of losing the regional government after 36 years of uninterrupted rule. On the other hand, liberal Citizens (Cs) and far-right Vox capitalized on the People's Party (PP)'s decline, with Vox winning an outstanding—and unexpected—12 seats, making it the fifth largest party in the region (the third in the constituency of Almería). Together, right-of-centre parties commanded 59 out of the 109 seats in parliament. Concurrently, Vox's result signalled the first time a far-right party had won seats in a regional parliament in Spain since the country's return to democracy, following the death of longtime dictator Francisco Franco in 1975.

The election was also notable for the negative electoral performances of PSOE and PP, the worst for both of them in the Spanish democratic period: the PSOE–A lost 400,000 votes, 7.4 points of the share and 14 seats, whereas the PP lost a further 300,000 votes, 6 percentage points and 7 seats over their already dwindling 2015 results. Since 2008, each party had lost around one million votes, 20 points and over 20 seats, with PSOE and PP at barely half of the share they had commanded in the 2004 and 2012 elections, respectively. Together, the two previously dominant parties in Andalusia garnered around 49% of the share and 54% of seats.

Analysts and journalists were divided on the causes behind the PSOE's downfall. Some attributed it to discontent with the Sánchez government and his policy of seeking the support of pro-Catalan independence parties in the Congress of Deputies after the vote of no confidence which ousted Mariano Rajoy as prime minister, which would have prompted a high turnout from right-wing voters. Others attributed it mostly to Susana Díaz's ruling style in Andalusia—amid high unemployment and rampant corruption scandals—discontent with her government's management of the education and health services in the region, her role in the ousting of Pedro Sánchez in 2016 and the subsequent PSOE's abstention to allow for Rajoy's investiture, and her failed attempt to become PSOE leader in 2017, together with a deep disenchantment and fatigue with the PSOE's 36-year spell in the regional government. Concurrently, the fragmentation within the centre-right to right-wing electorate was also noted as a remarkable event, as the PP's decades-long, unquestioned dominance over such spectrum came to an end.

== Aftermath ==
=== Reactions ===
After results were known, regional and national PP leaders Juanma Moreno and Pablo Casado hinted to an alliance of right-wing forces—including Vox—in order to expel the PSOE from the regional government. Concurrently, Cs leaders showed reluctance in allying themselves with Vox, claiming their right to attempt to form a government of their own with PP and PSOE support "without ruling out any other options". The still incumbent Susana Díaz urged for an "alliance of democratic forces" to form around her party in order to "build a firewall against the extreme right", but her chances of retaining power were regarded as slim. The PSOE leadership under Pedro Sánchez—Díaz's long-time party rival—was not expected to support her continuity at the helm of the regional party if she was not able to retain power, while concurrently ruling out giving support to any hypothetical Cs-led cabinet. Díaz ruled out a resignation as she "had won [the election]", reasserting her will to continue leading the PSOE and attempt forming a government with the support of any of the other parties but Vox.

Sánchez's first public reaction to the results was to assert that his government "will continue to promote a regenerative and pro-EU project for Spain. The results in Andalusia reinforce our commitment to defend the Constitution and democracy against fear". On 3 December, the day after the election, thousands gathered throughout the streets of several Andalusian capitals to protest "against fascist policies", after Vox's entry into parliament and its prospective influence in a new Andalusian government.

Within a few days from the election, both PP and Cs candidates, Juanma Moreno and Juan Marín clashed on the issue of who should lead the new government. The PP warned Marín that failing to support Moreno would mean a new regional election, anticipating that it could lead to a massive mobilization of PSOE voters who had abstained. The Cs leadership showed a willingness to enter negotiations with the PP if it was to elect Marín as president, but the party was weary of having to rely on the support of far-right Vox and instead kept their offer for an—unlikely—support or abstention from the PSOE. The possibility that Vox could have an influence in any future government divided Podemos: the national leadership did not rule out easening a Cs government with PSOE support, whereas regional leader Teresa Rodríguez voiced her explicit opposition to such scenario.

=== Government formation ===
Throughout December 2018, PP and Cs started negotiations for a prospective centre-right coalition government between the two parties, which would depend on Vox's external support. Cs ultimately agreed to support Moreno as regional president in exchange for 50% of the regional ministries and the leadership of the Parliament of Andalusia, which on 27 December resulted in Cs's Marta Bosquet becoming the second non-PSOE president of the Parliament of Andalusia. While Vox supported Bosquet, the party announced such a support did not imply they would automatically support a PP–Cs government without them being called into a formal negotiation with the two parties, which Cs refused to concede. The PSOE supported AA's candidate Inmaculada Nieto out of "plurality and generosity".

Election of the President of the Parliament of Andalusia
| Ballot → | 27 December 2018 | |
| Required majority → | 55 out of 109 | |
| Marta Bosquet (Cs) | 59 / 109 | check |
| Inmaculada Nieto (IULV–CA) | 50 / 109 | X mark |
| Blank ballots | 0 / 109 | |
| Invalid ballots | 0 / 109 | |
| Absentees | 0 / 109 | |

Both PP and Cs had been negotiating a formal agreement made of 90 core proposals, some of which—such as their promise to fully apply gender equality laws or the approval of various measures aimed at violence against women-prevention—went against Vox's own electoral manifesto. Cs warned that such a document was not negotiable and that it would constitute the basis for any prospective agreement with Vox, whereas PP leader Pablo Casado showed willingness to make some concessions to Vox in exchange for support and agreed to bring the far-right party into the negotiations.

On 8 January 2019, Vox published a list of 19 demands in exchange for supporting a centre-right government, including cuts in the regional self-government, a repeal of regional legislation affording special protection to women and LGTBI groups, and the creation of new laws to protect bullfighting, hunting and "popular culture and traditions", as well as the deportation of 52,000 undocumented migrants and the elimination of public subsidies for "supremacist feminism" and for "Islamic associations". Both Cs and leading PP figures were reportedly shocked by Vox's demands, which they saw as "unnaceptable" and "unnegotiable". Such demands, but also Casado's attempts to sympathize with Vox's stances, caused outcry within the PP's most moderate ranks—which regarded these positions as outrageous—but the PP leadership sought to keep on the negotiation with Vox nonetheless and called for the critics to not intervene. This advice went unheeded as an increasing number of PP regional leaders joined in their open criticism of Vox's demands.

The French government under Emmanuel Macron, European ally of Cs leader Albert Rivera, was reported to be closely following the government formation process in Andalusia and warned, ahead of the 2019 European Parliament election, that allying with far-right parties could not be a choice. Amid mounting criticism, it was reported throughout the afternoon of 9 January that PP and Cs, on the one hand, and PP and Vox, on the other, had reached separate agreements to elect Juanma Moreno as new regional president. Vox was reported to have renounced their most controversial demands, specially those on gender equality, in order to reach an agreement. The PSOE initially announced that it would field Susana Díaz for investiture and called for Cs to join "a democratic bloc" against the far-right, whereas AA showed a willingness to support any alternative candidate to prevent a Vox-influenced government. However, after the PP–Cs and PP–Vox agreements were formally confirmed, Díaz declined to attempt investiture and announced that she would lead the opposition. As a result, the date for Moreno's investiture was set for 15 and 16 January.

Investiture; Nomination of Juanma Moreno (PP)
| Ballot → | 16 January 2019 |
| Required majority → | 55 out of 109 |
| Yes: • PP (26); • Cs (21); • Vox (12) | 59 / 109 |
| No: • PSOE–A (33); • AA (17) | 50 / 109 |
| Abstentions | 0 / 109 |
| Absentees | 0 / 109 |

As a result of the investiture vote, Moreno was elected as new president of Andalusia, being sworn in on 18 January 2019. On 21 January, Moreno unveiled the composition of his new government, formed by 6 PP regional ministers—aside from himself—and 5 Cs members, with Cs leader Juan Marín being appointed as vice president.

== Bibliography ==
Legislation

- Ley Orgánica 5/1985, de 19 de junio, del Régimen Electoral General (Organic Law 5/1985). Official State Gazette (in Spanish). 19 June 1985 [version as of 17 January 2018]. BOE-A-1985-11672.
- Ley 1/1986, de 2 de enero, Electoral de Andalucía (Law 1/1986). Official State Gazette (in Spanish). 2 January 1986 [version as of 28 October 2014]. BOE-A-1986-2788.
- Ley 6/2006, de 24 de octubre, del Gobierno de la Comunidad Autónoma de Andalucía (Law 6/2006). Official State Gazette (in Spanish). 24 October 2006 [version as of 30 June 2014]. BOE-A-2006-20848.
- Ley Orgánica 2/2007, de 19 de marzo, de reforma del Estatuto de Autonomía para Andalucía (Organic Law 2/2007). Official State Gazette (in Spanish). 19 March 2007 [version as of 11 April 2011]. BOE-A-2007-5825.
- Decreto de la Presidenta 8/2018, de 8 de octubre, de disolución del Parlamento de Andalucía y de convocatoria de elecciones (PDF) (Decree 8/2018). Official Gazette of the Regional Government of Andalusia (in Spanish). 8 October 2018.

Other

- Rama, José; Zanotti, Lisa; Turnbull-Dugarte, Stuart J.; Santana, Andrés (2021). VOX: The Rise of the Spanish Populist Radical Right. Routledge. ISBN 9781000394481. Archived from the original on 26 April 2022.
