= Provincial Deputation of Málaga =

- Diputación Provincial de Málaga
- Coat of arms

- Logo

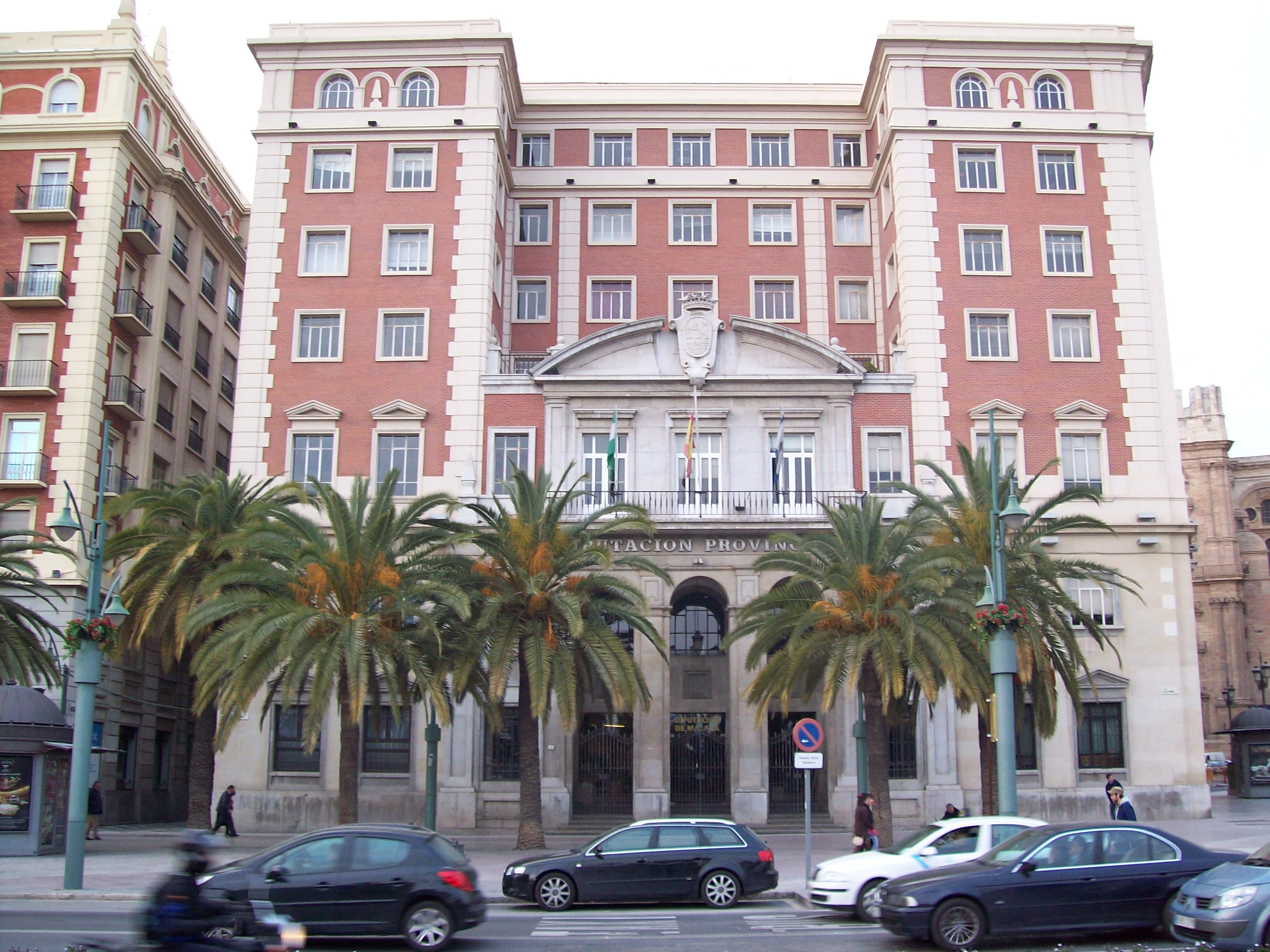
- Building of the Provincial Deputation in the Plaza de la Marina, Málaga.

Provincial Deputation overview
- Jurisdiction: Province of Málaga
- Headquarters: Edificio de la Diputación de Málaga. Málaga, Spain

The Provincial Deputation of Málaga (Spanish: Diputación Provincial de Málaga or more formally La Excelentísima Diputación Provincial de Málaga) is the provincial government of the province of Málaga, in the autonomous community of Andalusia, Spain. As a public institution, it provides direct services to citizens and provides technical, economic, and technological support to the governments and administrations (ayuntamientos) of the 101 municipalities of the Province of Málaga. It also coordinates some municipal services and organizes services of a supramunicipal character. It is headquartered in the city of Málaga.

The Provincial Deputation was established in 1836, as a result of the 1833 division of Spain into provinces. In that era, it had responsibility for public works, education, and care of the poor; prior to the creation of the autonomous communities, provinces were the only organ intermediate between municipalities and the central government of Spain.

On April 26, 1979, during the Spanish transition to democracy, the Deputation was reconstituted as a democratic entity.

As of 2025, the president of the Deputation is Francisco Salado of the People's Party (PP).

== Elected presidents of the Deputation ==
- 1979-1982: Enrique Linde Cirujano (PSOE)
- 1982-1987: Luis Pagán Saura (PSOE)
- 1987-1991: Antonio Maldonado Pérez (PSOE)
- 1991-1995: José María Ruiz Povedano (PSOE)
- 1995-1999: Luis Alberto Vázquez Alfarache (PP)
- 1999-2003: Juan Fraile Cantón (PSOE)
- 2003-2011: Salvador Pendón Muñoz (PSOE)
- 2011-2019: Elías Bendodo Benasayag (PP)
- Since 2019: Francisco Salado Escaño (PP)
