= 2015 Andalusian regional election =

Election in the Spanish region of Andalusia

- 22 March 2015

All 109 seats in the Parliament of Andalusia 55 seats needed for a majority
- Opinion polls
- Registered: 6,462,627 ▲1.1%
- Turnout: 4,026,282 (62.3%) ▲1.5 pp
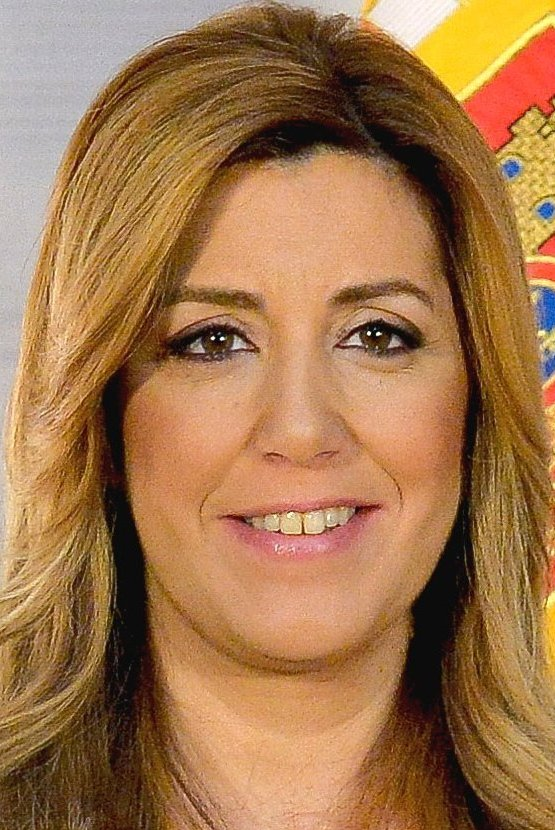

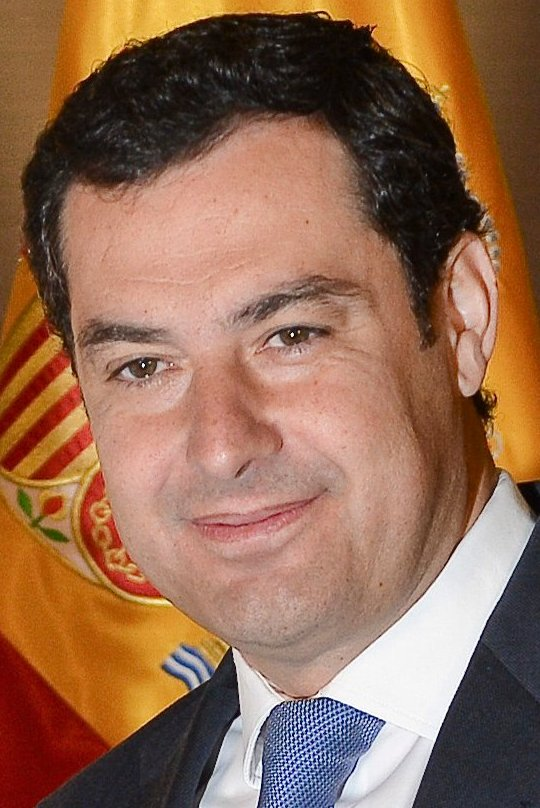

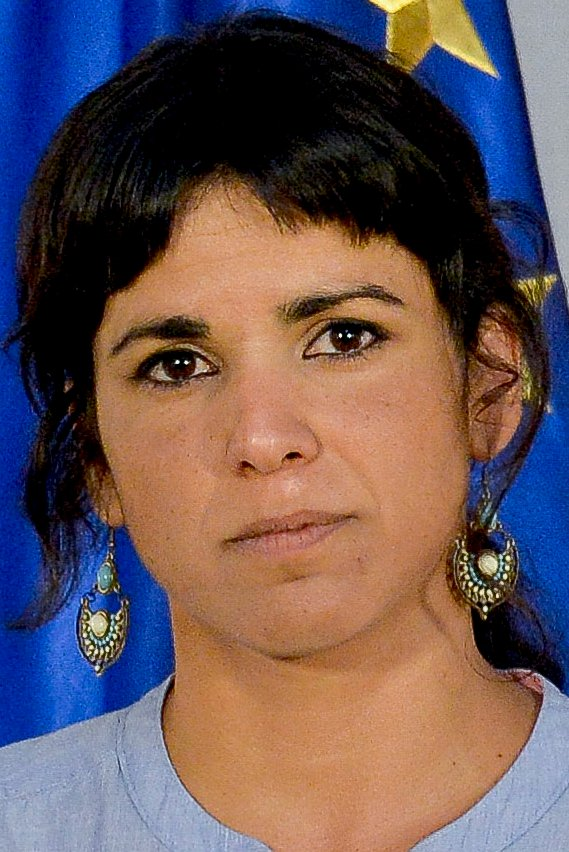

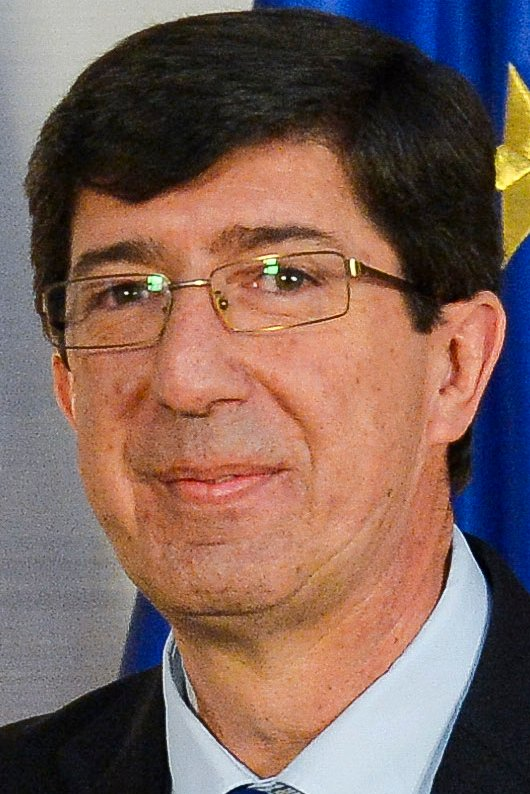

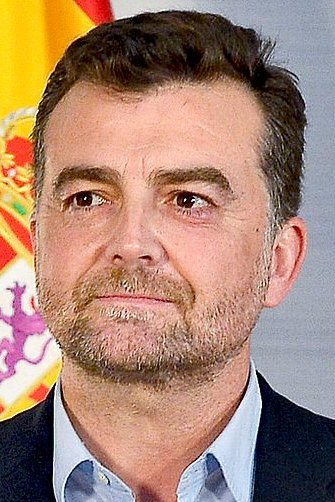
	First party	Second party	Third party
Leader	Susana Díaz	Juanma Moreno	Teresa Rodríguez
Party	PSOE–A	PP	Podemos
Leader since	7 September 2013	1 March 2014	9 February 2015
Leader's seat	Seville	Málaga	Cádiz
Last election	47 seats, 39.6%	50 seats, 40.7%	Did not contest
Seats won	47	33	15
Seat change	0	▼17	▲15
Popular vote	1,411,278	1,065,685	592,133
Percentage	35.4%	26.7%	14.9%
Swing	▼4.2 pp	▼14.0 pp	New party
	Fourth party	Fifth party
Leader	Juan Marín	Antonio Maíllo
Party	C's	IULV–CA
Leader since	6 February 2015	16 June 2013
Leader's seat	Seville	Seville
Last election	Did not contest	12 seats, 11.3%
Seats won	9	5
Seat change	▲9	▼7
Popular vote	369,896	274,426
Percentage	9.3%	6.9%
Swing	New party	▼4.4 pp
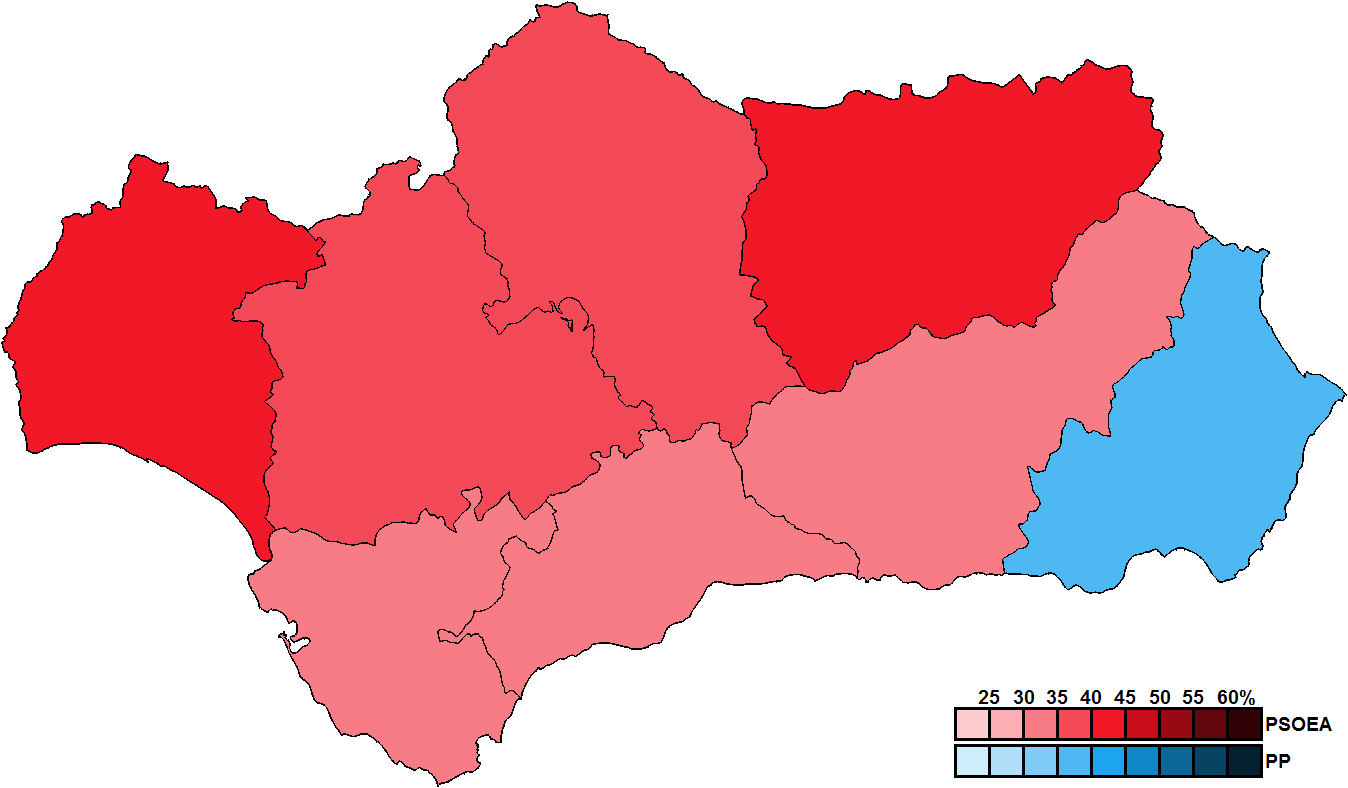
- Constituency results map for the Parliament of Andalusia
President before election
Susana Díaz
PSOE–A
President after election
Susana Díaz
PSOE–A

A regional election was held in Andalusia on 22 March 2015 to elect the 10th Parliament of the autonomous community. All 109 seats in the Parliament were up for election.

President Susana Díaz chose to terminate the coalition government between her Spanish Socialist Workers' Party (PSOE–A) and United Left (IULV–CA), dissolving the Parliament and calling a snap election for 22 March 2015. Andalusia had been traditionally considered a PSOE stronghold, being the only region in Spain in which no other party had led the regional government since the Spanish transition to democracy.

The PSOE–A regained first place from a declining People's Party (PP). Suffering from voters' anger at Mariano Rajoy's national government management of the economic crisis and the corruption scandals affecting the party nationwide, the PP scored its worst result since 1990. The election also saw a strong performance by newcomers Podemos (Spanish for "We can") and Citizens (C's), which faced their first electoral test since the 2014 European Parliament election. IULV–CA was decimated by Podemos's surge and obtained its worst historical showing.

After the election, the PP announced it would block any PSOE attempt to form a government, a shock to many after the party had assured during the electoral campaign that it would allow the most-voted party to access government. Podemos and C's remained reluctant to lend support to Susana Díaz's investiture, whereas IU was not willing to align with the Socialists again after their previous alliance broke up. In the end, however, after the 2015 Spanish regional and municipal elections were held, C's agreed to support Díaz investiture on less harsher conditions than initially required, in order to end the parliamentary deadlock and prevent a new election.

== Background ==
Despite losing the 2012 regional election to the People's Party (PP), which won a regional election in Andalusia for the first time since the establishment of the autonomous community, the Spanish Socialist Workers' Party (PSOE) under José Antonio Griñán was able to remain in office for a ninth consecutive term after forming a coalition government with United Left/The Greens–Assembly for Andalusia (IULV–CA).

In July 2013, José Antonio Griñán announced his intention to resign from office in order to "preserve the Regional Government from the erosion of the ERE scandal", a large slush fund corruption scheme involving former leading figures of the regional PSOE's branch, including former development minister Magdalena Álvarez, with former Andalusian president Manuel Chaves and himself being accused of knowing and concealing such a plot. Griñán was succeeded by Susana Díaz at the helm of the regional government.

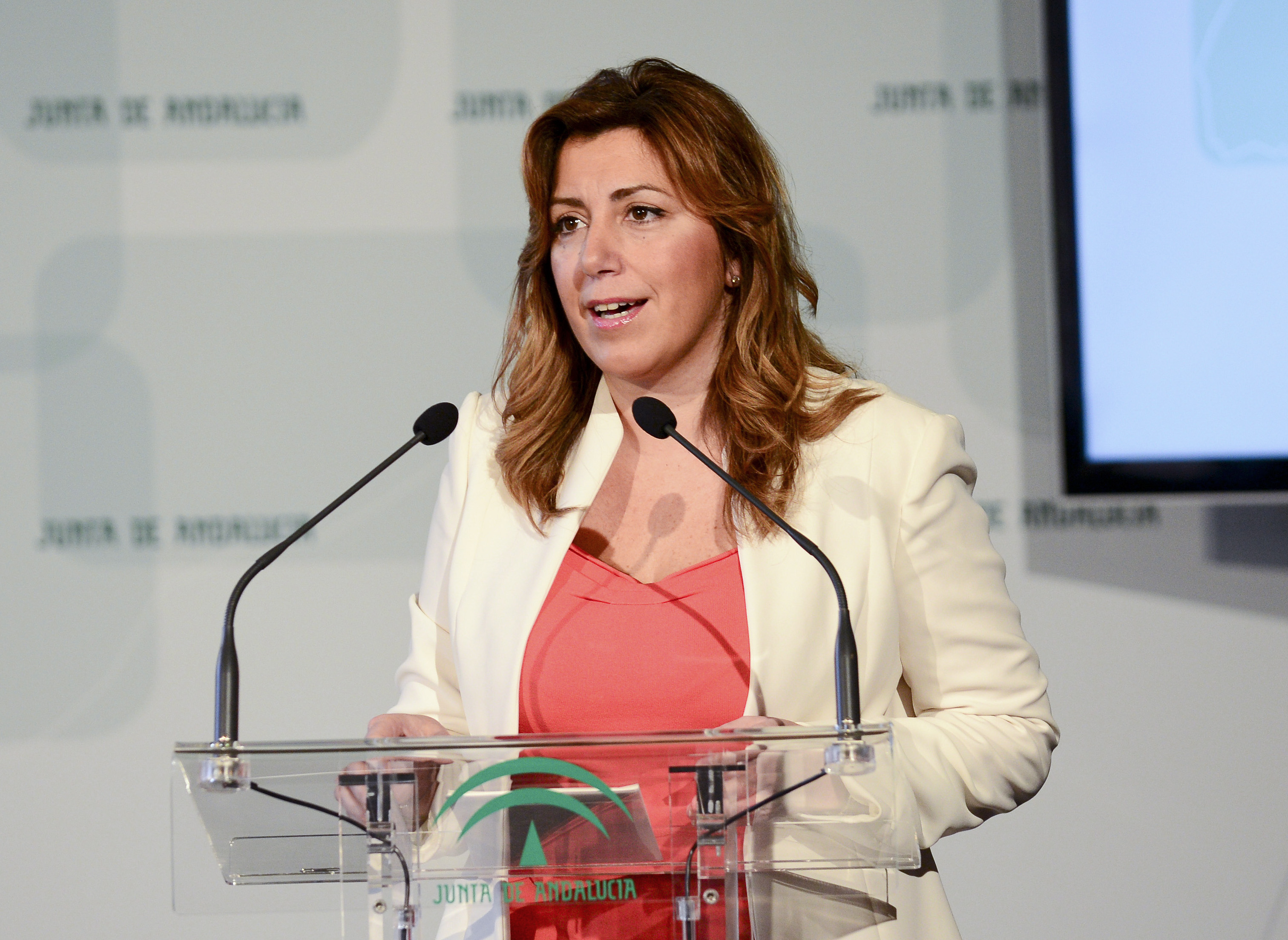
Susana Díaz took over from José Antonio Griñán as new president of Andalusia on 7 September 2013.

Despite the apparent parliamentary comfort of the ruling coalition, friction between both PSOE and IU remained an issue throughout the entire legislature, especially after Susana Díaz took over the government in September 2013. In April 2014, an episode of IU's housing counsellor awarding several government houses to homeless families without the president's consent resulted in the counsellor seeing her competences removed and in the coalition pact nearly breaking up. In January 2015, tension between both coalition partners reached its peak after IU proposed holding a referendum among its members in June 2015 on whether to remain or withdraw from the government. In response, Susana Díaz declared that "we need a government which enjoys a stability that currently does not exist", opening the door for a snap election to be held within a short time. On 20 January Díaz met all eight PSOE provincial leaders in order to seek support within the party for a snap election in March 2015, which she received; subsequently, mutual attacks between both PSOE and IU, accusing each other of breaching the coalition agreement, made it clear that the only solution to the ongoing governmental crisis would come by the calling of a snap election.

On 17 February 2015, one month short of the election, the Spanish Supreme Court charged former Andalusian presidents Manuel Chaves and José Antonio Griñán in the ERE scandal for their possible responsibility in the misuse of the misappropriated public funds. The PSOE insisted on the same day that it would not require Chaves and Griñán to give up their seats in the Congress of Deputies and Senate, despite both incumbent president Susana Díaz and PSOE leader Pedro Sánchez having assured in the past that they would do so in the event of both of them being charged.

== Overview ==
Under the 2007 Statute of Autonomy, the Parliament of Andalusia was the unicameral legislature of the homonymous autonomous community, having legislative power in devolved matters, as well as the ability to grant or withdraw confidence from a regional president. The electoral and procedural rules were supplemented by national law provisions.

=== Date ===
The term of the Parliament of Andalusia expired four years after the date of its previous election, unless it was dissolved earlier. The election decree was required to be issued no later than 25 days before the scheduled expiration date of parliament and published on the following day in the Official Gazette of the Regional Government of Andalusia (BOJA), with election day taking place 54 days after the decree's publication (barring any date within from 1 July to 31 August). The previous election was held on 25 March 2012, which meant that the chamber's term would have expired on 25 March 2016. The election decree was required to be published in the BOJA no later than 1 March 2016, setting the latest possible date for election day on 24 April 2016.

The regional president had the prerogative to dissolve the Parliament of Andalusia at any given time and call a snap election, provided that no motion of no confidence was in process and that dissolution did not occur before one year after a previous one. In the event of an investiture process failing to elect a regional president within a two-month period from the first ballot, the Parliament was to be automatically dissolved and a fresh election called.

An extraordinary parliamentary plenary session was held on 26 January, where Díaz announced the dissolution of parliament and the subsequent calling of a snap election for 22 March. Díaz herself had previously declared, during a PSOE rally in Seville, that "It is time for the Andalusian people to speak" and "We shall obtain the [people's] confidence in the ballots". Spanish media speculated that the snap election came as a result of different factors; namely, Susana Díaz's private aspirations to the Spanish Socialist Workers' Party's leadership—despite her publicly refusing it—, as well as both Podemos's surge in opinion polls and to prevent the party's exhaustion after all 2015 electoral calls—local and regional in May, Catalan in September and general in autumn—, in a time when opinion polls were still favorable to the PSOE in Andalusia.

The Parliament of Andalusia was officially dissolved on 27 January 2015 with the publication of the corresponding decree in the BOJA, setting election day for 22 March and scheduling for the chamber to reconvene on 16 April.

=== Electoral system ===
Voting for the Parliament was based on universal suffrage, comprising all Spanish nationals over 18 years of age, registered in Andalusia and with full political rights, provided that they had not been deprived of the right to vote by a final sentence, nor were legally incapacitated. Additionally, non-resident citizens were required to apply for voting, a system known as "begged" voting (Spanish: Voto rogado).

The Parliament of Andalusia had a minimum of 109 seats, with electoral provisions fixing its size at that number. All were elected in eight multi-member constituencies—corresponding to the provinces of Almería, Cádiz, Córdoba, Granada, Huelva, Jaén, Málaga and Seville, each of which was assigned an initial minimum of eight seats and the remaining 45 distributed in proportion to population (with the number of seats in each province not exceeding two times that of any other)—using the D'Hondt method and closed-list proportional voting, with a three percent-threshold of valid votes (including blank ballots) in each constituency. The use of this electoral method resulted in a higher effective threshold depending on district magnitude and vote distribution.

As a result of the aforementioned allocation, each Parliament constituency was entitled the following seats:

Seats	Constituencies
18	Seville
17	Málaga
15	Cádiz
13	Granada
12	Almería, Córdoba
11	Huelva, Jaén

The law did not provide for by-elections to fill vacant seats; instead, any vacancies arising after the proclamation of candidates and during the legislative term were filled by the next candidates on the party lists or, when required, by designated substitutes.

=== Outgoing parliament ===
The table below shows the composition of the parliamentary groups in the chamber at the time of dissolution.

Parliamentary composition in January 2015
Groups	Parties	Legislators	
Groups	Parties	Seats	Total
Andalusian People's Parliamentary Group	PP	50	50
Socialist Parliamentary Group	PSOE–A	47	47
United Left/The Greens Parliamentary Group	IULV–CA	12	12

== Parties and candidates ==
The electoral law allowed for parties and federations registered in the interior ministry, alliances and groupings of electors to present lists of candidates. Parties and federations intending to form an alliance were required to inform the relevant electoral commission within 10 days of the election call, whereas groupings of electors needed to secure the signature of at least one percent of the electorate in the constituencies for which they sought election, disallowing electors from signing for more than one list. Additionally, a balanced composition of men and women was required in the electoral lists through the use of a zipper system.

Below is a list of the main parties and alliances which contested the election:

Candidacy	Parties and alliances	Leading candidate	Ideology	Previous result		Gov.	Ref.
Candidacy	Parties and alliances	Leading candidate	Ideology	Vote %	Seats	Gov.	Ref.
PP	List: People's Party (PP)	Juanma Moreno	Conservatism; Christian democracy	40.7%	50	No	
PSOE–A	List: Spanish Socialist Workers' Party of Andalusia (PSOE–A)	Susana Díaz	Social democracy	39.6%	47	Yes	
IULV–CA	List: United Left/The Greens–Assembly for Andalusia (IULV–CA) – Communist Party of Andalusia (PCA) – The Dawn Marxist Organization (La Aurora (OM)) – Republican Left (IR) – Open Left (IzAb); Building the Left–Socialist Alternative (CLI–AS)	Antonio Maíllo	Socialism; Communism	11.3%	12	No	
UPyD	List: Union, Progress and Democracy (UPyD)	Martín de la Herrán	Social liberalism Radical centrism	3.4%	0	No	
PA	List: Andalusian Party (PA)	Antonio Jesús Ruiz	Andalusian nationalism Social democracy	2.5%	0	No	
Podemos	List: We Can (Podemos)	Teresa Rodríguez	Left-wing populism Direct democracy Democratic socialism	Did not contest		No	
Cs	List: Citizens–Party of the Citizenry (Cs)	Juan Marín	Liberalism	Did not contest		No	

== Campaign ==
=== Debates ===
2015 Andalusian regional election debates
Date	Organizer(s)	Moderator(s)	P Present (Note: Denotes a main invitee attending the event.) S Surrogate (Note: Denotes a main invitee not attending the event, sending a surrogate in their place.) NI Not invited I Invited A Absent invitee								
Date	Organizer(s)	Moderator(s)	PP	PSOE–A	IULV–CA	UPyD	PA	Podemos	Cs	Audience	Ref.
9 March	RTVA	Mabel Mata	P Moreno	P Díaz	P Maíllo	NI	NI	NI	NI	10.7% (400,000)	
10 March	RTVA	Rafael Fernández	S Rojas	S Jiménez	P Maíllo	P De la Herrán	P Ruiz	S Rodríguez	P Marín	4.0% (150,000)	
16 March	RTVE	María Casado	P Moreno	P Díaz	P Maíllo	NI	NI	NI	NI	14.0% (540,000) (Note: The debate was broadcast nationwide on 24 Horas, obtaining an audience of 0.5% (112,000).)	

Opinion polls

Candidate viewed as "performing best" or "most convincing" in each debate
Debate	Polling firm/Commissioner	PP	PSOE–A	IULV–CA	None
9 March	Celeste-Tel/PSOE	22.8	43.6	10.1	14.9

== Opinion polls ==
The tables below list opinion polling results in reverse chronological order, showing the most recent first and using the dates when the survey fieldwork was done, as opposed to the date of publication. Where the fieldwork dates are unknown, the date of publication is given instead. The highest percentage figure in each polling survey is displayed with its background shaded in the leading party's colour. If a tie ensues, this is applied to the figures with the highest percentages. The "Lead" column on the right shows the percentage-point difference between the parties with the highest percentages in a poll.

=== Graphical summary ===
Local regression trend line of poll results from 25 March 2012 to 22 March 2015, with each line corresponding to a political party.

=== Voting intention estimates ===
The table below lists weighted voting intention estimates. Refusals are generally excluded from the party vote percentages, while question wording and the treatment of "don't know" responses and those not intending to vote may vary between polling organisations. When available, seat projections determined by the polling organisations are displayed below (or in place of) the percentages in a smaller font; 55 seats were required for an absolute majority in the Parliament of Andalusia.

Color key:

Poll conducted after legal ban on opinion polls Exit poll

Polling firm/Commissioner	Fieldwork date	Sample size	Turnout	PP	PSOE–A	IULV	UPyD	PA	Podemos	C's	Lead
2015 regional election	22 Mar 2015	—N/a	62.3	26.7; 33	35.4; 47	6.9; 5	1.9; 0	1.5; 0	14.9; 15	9.3; 9	8.7
TNS Demoscopia/RTVA	22 Mar 2015	33,600	?	26.9; 32/35	33.1; 41/44	7.3; 6/7	2.2; 0	1.7; 0	17.5; 19/22	8.0; 6/7	6.2
GAD3/ABC	5–20 Mar 2015	2,400	65.0	27.3; 33/38	33.7; 39/44	7.5; 5/6	1.7; 0	1.3; 0	15.9; 16/20	9.4; 7/10	6.4
JM&A/El Español	16 Mar 2015	?	68.7	24.6; 31	33.4; 41	6.4; 4	1.8; 0	2.0; 0	18.3; 21	10.4; 12	8.8
Encuestamos	16 Mar 2015	?	?	21.3; 27/30	32.7; 42/44	8.1; 7/8	3.6; 0	–	14.8; 13/15	15.4; 15/17	11.4
GAD3/ABC	16 Mar 2015	?	?	? 33/38	? 40/43	? 6/8	–	–	? 12/15	? 10/13	?
NC Report/La Razón	2–14 Mar 2015	1,300	69.9	26.8; 32/33	33.1; 43/45	6.5; 4/5	2.7; 0	2.5; 0	15.2; 15/16	11.8; 10/12	6.3
Deimos Estadística	10–13 Mar 2015	1,056	?	24.0; 27	36.3; 45	7.9; 7	2.1; 0	1.6; 0	16.4; 20	10.3; 10	12.3
Celeste-Tel/Prensa Ibérica	9–13 Mar 2015	2,400	70.6	23.7; 29/30	37.5; 50	6.2; 4/5	2.4; 0	2.3; 0	14.7; 16	11.4; 9	13.8
GAD3/ABC	5–13 Mar 2015	1,300	?	28.4; 34/38	32.4; 40/44	7.1; 5/7	1.3; 0	1.6; 0	15.5; 15/18	10.9; 8/9	4.0
Sigma Dos/El Mundo	9–12 Mar 2015	1,800	?	26.8; 32/36	33.1; 41/44	6.8; 4	2.0; 0	–	15.2; 16/18	11.4; 11/12	6.3
Metroscopia/El País	5–11 Mar 2015	3,200	69	25.1; 29	36.7; 45	8.5; 8	1.3; 0	–	14.7; 15	11.0; 12	11.6
MyWord/Cadena SER	3–11 Mar 2015	1,215	?	22.3; 26/27	33.6; 42	6.2; 6/7	2.0; 0	1.4; 0	19.9; 24/25	10.7; 9/10	11.3
JM&A/El Español	6 Mar 2015	?	65.0	27.3; 36	33.3; 42	5.5; 4	2.6; 0	1.0; 0	19.4; 22	6.6; 5	6.0
Celeste-Tel/Prensa Ibérica	2–6 Mar 2015	2,400	?	26.6; 34	36.9; 49	6.8; 5	2.5; 0	2.9; 0	14.0; 16	8.4; 5	10.3
Invymark/laSexta	2–5 Mar 2015	?	?	29.9	36.7	6.0	2.1	2.0	14.5	7.1	6.8
NC Report/La Razón	17 Feb–4 Mar 2015	1,300	62.2	28.2; 34	33.1; 44/46	7.2; 6	2.5; 0	2.8; 0	14.3; 14/16	10.1; 8/10	4.9
JM&A	2 Mar 2015	?	?	28.7; 37	35.7; 43	7.1; 7	2.8; 0	1.8; 0	14.9; 17	6.1; 5	7.0
Commentia/Grupo Joly	20 Feb–2 Mar 2015	1,800	?	30.7; 36/39	35.9; 41/46	4.1; 3	1.2; 0	–	19.4; 18/21	5.6; 5/6	5.2
Liceo Andaluz de Economía	2–27 Feb 2015	1,500	?	22.2; 29	28.7; 38	11.2; 8	1.3; 0	6.1; 3	16.1; 23	12.1; 8	6.5
Deimos Estadística	18–25 Feb 2015	1,539	?	25.7; 33	33.4; 40	6.1; 4	1.5; 0	1.5; 0	22.3; 25	7.8; 7	7.7
Metroscopia/El País	23–24 Feb 2015	1,000	70	22.7; 27/31	34.6; 40/44	6.8; 5/9	2.8; 0	–	16.7; 18/22	11.0; 8/12	11.9
IMC/ABC	16–21 Feb 2015	1,100	?	30.7; 39/42	37.8; 44/48	4.7; 3/5	2.4; 0	1.1; 0	12.0; 12/14	5.0; 3/5	7.1
Celeste-Tel/Prensa Ibérica	12–20 Feb 2015	2,400	69.6	27.4; 35	36.7; 48	7.4; 6	2.6; 0	3.1; 0	14.7; 17	6.1; 3	9.3
CIS	30 Jan–17 Feb 2015	3,130	?	25.7; 34	34.7; 44	6.6; 4/5	2.3; 0	1.2; 0	19.2; 21/22	6.4; 5	9.0
AIED	2–10 Feb 2015	500	?	22.2; 26/28	30.8; 39/43	8.4; 9/11	6.1; 2/5	3.2; 0/1	19.0; 19/23	3.0; 0	8.6
JM&A	8 Feb 2015	?	?	29.0; 38	34.2; 43	8.2; 7	3.4; 0	2.3; 0	16.5; 20	3.5; 1	5.2
JM&A/El Español	31 Jan 2015	?	60.1	27.8; 36/37	30.6; 40	9.7; 10	4.0; 0/1	2.5; 0	18.9; 22	2.6; 0	2.8
CADPEA/UGR	8–31 Jan 2015	1,200	62.9	29.1	35.2	8.4	3.1	2.4	14.9	4.6	6.1
GAD3/ABC	27–30 Jan 2015	800	?	32.7; 39/42	36.4; 43/46	7.1; 7/9	–	–	13.5; 15/17	4.4; 0	3.7
Sigma Dos/El Mundo	26–29 Jan 2015	1,800	?	30.2; 39/42	34.7; 43/45	8.2; 5/7	3.5; 0/1	–	15.6; 17/19	3.4; 0	4.5
Invymark/laSexta	19–23 Jan 2015	?	?	29.4	39.6	8.7	3.0	–	15.2	–	10.2
Celeste-Tel/Prensa Ibérica	17–22 Jan 2015	3,300	?	27.8; 36	36.0; 47	7.3; 7	2.8; 0	3.2; 0	16.1; 17	4.6; 2	8.2
Liceo Andaluz de Economía	17 Nov–12 Dec 2014	1,500	?	23.8	29.9	12.5	4.5	7.4	15.2	–	6.1
Commentia/Grupo Joly	20 Nov–3 Dec 2014	800	?	24.9	30.9	12.8	4.8	–	17.4	2.0	6.0
MyWord/Cadena SER	1–27 Aug 2014	798	?	28.3	31.2	8.8	5.4	0.8	18.1	–	2.9
Invymark/laSexta	21–25 Jul 2014	1,100	?	29.7	38.4	12.4	4.5	2.3	9.5	–	8.7
CADPEA/UGR	23 Jun–8 Jul 2014	1,200	60.1	36.2	36.9	10.0	5.0	2.3	6.6	–	0.7
2014 EP election	25 May 2014	—N/a	41.9	25.9 (35)	35.1 (51)	11.6 (12)	7.1 (6)	1.7 (0)	7.1 (5)	1.7 (0)	9.2
Commentia/Grupo Joly	5–18 Feb 2014	802	?	30.8	35.6	15.0	6.3	2.7	–	–	4.8
NC Report/La Razón	11–15 Feb 2014	808	52.9	33.2; 43/45	35.3; 45/46	15.9; 17/18	6.0; 0/2	3.9; 0/1	–	–	2.1
CADPEA/UGR	8 Jan–7 Feb 2014	3,200	55.7	31.1	36.7	15.5	7.4	3.0	–	–	5.6
Sigma Dos/ABC	20 Jun–27 Sep 2013	6,400	?	36.2; 46	36.9; 45	14.1; 14	5.8; 4	–	–	–	0.7
CUATREM/andalucesdiario.es	9–13 Sep 2013	625	54.2	30.5	37.1	14.1	8.4	3.9	–	–	6.6
NC Report/La Razón	8 Sep 2013	200	52.8	32.9; 43/45	35.8; 45/47	16.2; 18/19	5.6; 0/1	4.0; 0	–	–	2.9
CADPEA/UGR	8–23 Jul 2013	1,200	50.7	29.0	36.1	18.7	6.8	2.9	–	–	7.1
CUATREM/andalucesdiario.es	1–5 Jul 2013	625	52.5	32.2	36.9	15.1	6.1	3.4	–	–	4.7
CUATREM/andalucesdiario.es	8–13 May 2013	625	49.8	29.8	40.4	16.8	5.5	1.7	–	–	10.6
Commentia/Grupo Joly	7–19 Feb 2013	800	?	34.4	37.9	15.1	5.1	2.7	–	–	3.5
Nexo/CEPES–A	24 Jan–14 Feb 2013	1,200	62	34.2; 42/44	41.0; 49/51	13.7; 12/14	5.5; 2/3	2.4; 0/1	–	–	6.8
UJA/Diario Córdoba	21 Jan–8 Feb 2013	2,000	?	29.5	39.1	16.4	6.7	2.3	–	–	9.6
CADPEA/UGR	8–24 Jan 2013	1,200	53.1	34.4	38.0	14.2	6.4	2.6	–	–	3.6
IESA/CSIC	10 Oct–7 Nov 2012	3,675	67.4	30.7; 40/41	39.2; 49/51	16.1; 15/16	5.8; 3/4	3.3; 0	–	–	8.5
CADPEA/UGR	11–29 Jun 2012	1,200	62.5	37.6	39.8	12.7	4.1	2.3	–	–	2.2
2012 regional election	25 Mar 2012	—N/a	60.8	40.7; 50	39.6; 47	11.3; 12	3.4; 0	2.5; 0	–	–	1.1

=== Voting preferences ===
The table below lists raw, unweighted voting preferences.

Polling firm/Commissioner	Fieldwork date	Sample size	PP	PSOE–A	IULV	UPyD	PA	Podemos	C's	Question	X mark	Lead
2015 regional election (Note: Does not include non-resident citizens.)	22 Mar 2015	—N/a	16.9	22.4	4.4	1.2	1.0	9.4	5.9	—N/a	36.1	5.5
Metroscopia/El País	5–11 Mar 2015	3,200	14.5	23.9	5.9	0.9	–	10.1	7.6	26.5	4.5	9.4
MyWord/Cadena SER	3–11 Mar 2015	1,215	14.5	19.7	5.1	1.8	1.1	16.1	8.4	22.1	5.7	3.6
Commentia/Grupo Joly	20 Feb–2 Mar 2015	1,800	18.9	19.9	1.8	0.7	–	12.2	3.1	37.8	3.2	1.0
Metroscopia/El País	23–24 Feb 2015	1,000	14.6	21.1	3.7	1.6	–	10.8	6.4	29.9	5.9	6.5
CIS	30 Jan–17 Feb 2015	3,130	12.8	25.5	3.8	1.7	0.8	13.7	3.5	21.3	11.0	11.8
CADPEA/UGR	8–31 Jan 2015	1,200	13.0	20.5	6.6	2.0	1.4	12.1	3.4	21.0	11.3	7.5
MyWord/Cadena SER	1–27 Aug 2014	798	12.7	11.0	3.0	6.6	1.4	25.4	–	19.2	7.3	12.7
CADPEA/UGR	23 Jun–8 Jul 2014	1,200	12.9	19.3	7.5	3.7	1.4	10.3	0.7	20.7	14.9	6.4
2014 EP election	25 May 2014	—N/a	11.0	14.9	4.9	3.0	0.7	3.0	0.7	—N/a	56.9	3.9
Commentia/Grupo Joly	5–18 Feb 2014	802	9.3	14.4	6.1	2.8	–	–	–	31.9	14.8	5.1
CADPEA/UGR	8 Jan–7 Feb 2014	3,200	12.7	17.2	9.8	4.7	1.7	–	–	20.6	17.5	4.5
CUATREM/andalucesdiario.es	9–13 Sep 2013	625	11.6	20.9	10.6	4.8	2.1	–	–	27.2	17.7	9.3
CADPEA/UGR	8–23 Jul 2013	1,200	10.2	18.7	9.5	5.0	1.1	–	–	21.8	18.2	8.5
CUATREM/andalucesdiario.es	1–5 Jul 2013	625	15.7	21.4	11.0	4.9	1.6	–	–	27.3	14.9	5.7
CUATREM/andalucesdiario.es	8–13 May 2013	625	15.2	19.3	12.8	3.2	1.4	–	–	28.2	16.2	4.1
CADPEA/UGR	8–24 Jan 2013	1,200	14.8	18.1	8.3	3.3	1.7	–	–	22.3	19.5	3.3
IESA/CSIC	10 Oct–7 Nov 2012	3,675	18.2	24.1	9.1	3.1	1.8	–	–	26.1	12.6	5.9
CADPEA/UGR	11–29 Jun 2012	1,200	27.9	22.8	8.8	3.5	1.5	–	–	15.3	13.9	5.1
2012 regional election	25 Mar 2012	—N/a	25.2	24.5	7.0	2.1	1.6	–	–	—N/a	37.8	0.7

=== Victory preferences ===
The table below lists opinion polling on the victory preferences for each party in the event of a regional election taking place.

Polling firm/Commissioner	Fieldwork date	Sample size	PP	PSOE–A	IULV	UPyD	PA	Podemos	C's	Other/ None	Question	Lead
CIS	30 Jan–17 Feb 2015	3,130	14.5	28.3	4.6	1.6	0.9	15.8	3.9	1.8	28.7	12.5
IESA/CSIC	10 Oct–7 Nov 2012	3,675	20.6	28.7	11.0	3.7	2.4	–	–	5.5	28.1	8.1

=== Victory likelihood ===
The table below lists opinion polling on the perceived likelihood of victory for each party in the event of a regional election taking place.

Polling firm/Commissioner	Fieldwork date	Sample size	PP	PSOE–A	IULV	UPyD	Podemos	C's	Other/ None	Question	Lead
CIS	30 Jan–17 Feb 2015	3,130	12.7	51.9	0.3	0.1	10.2	0.1	0.3	24.5	39.2
Commentia/Grupo Joly	20 Nov–3 Dec 2014	800	8.2	58.1	–	–	–	–	33.7		49.9
Commentia/Grupo Joly	5–18 Feb 2014	802	10.7	59.7	–	–	–	–	29.6		49.0

=== Preferred President ===
The table below lists opinion polling on leader preferences to become president of the Regional Government of Andalusia.

Polling firm/Commissioner	Fieldwork date	Sample size						Other/ None/ Not care	Question	Lead
Polling firm/Commissioner	Fieldwork date	Sample size	Moreno PP	Díaz PSOE–A	Maíllo IULV	Rodríguez Podemos	Marín Cs	Other/ None/ Not care	Question	Lead
Invymark/laSexta	2–5 Mar 2015	?	–	37.6	–	–	–	–	–	?
Metroscopia/El País	23–24 Feb 2015	1,000	16.0	36.0	4.0	10.0	3.0	10.0	21.0	20.0
CIS	30 Jan–17 Feb 2015	3,130	9.9	32.9	2.8	–	–	23.7	30.7	23.0

== Voter turnout ==
The table below shows registered voter turnout during the election. Figures for election day do not include non-resident citizens, while final figures do.

Province	Time (Election day)									Final		
Province	14:00			18:00			20:00			Final		
Province	2012	2015	+/–	2012	2015	+/–	2012	2015	+/–	2012	2015	+/–
Almería	29.23%	32.87%	+3.64	45.97%	48.35%	+2.38	60.51%	60.50%	−0.01	56.97%	60.52%	+3.55
Cádiz	25.76%	31.15%	+5.39	41.86%	48.19%	+6.33	54.29%	59.10%	+4.81	53.22%	57.70%	+4.48
Córdoba	31.85%	35.96%	+4.11	50.23%	53.57%	+3.34	66.50%	67.15%	+0.65	66.50%	65.61%	−0.89
Granada	30.86%	34.80%	+3.94	49.43%	51.86%	+2.43	65.43%	64.97%	−0.46	62.44%	61.39%	+1.05
Huelva	27.02%	30.80%	+3.78	44.13%	46.88%	+2.75	60.84%	61.06%	+0.22	60.05%	60.11%	+0.06
Jaén	32.90%	36.76%	+3.86	52.36%	54.20%	+1.84	70.74%	69.30%	−1.44	69.56%	67.95%	−1.61
Málaga	28.09%	32.22%	+4.13	44.67%	49.61%	+4.94	58.05%	61.08%	+3.03	56.33%	58.92%	+2.59
Seville	29.97%	35.91%	+5.94	49.54%	54.83%	+5.29	64.93%	67.22%	+2.29	64.00%	65.99%	+1.99
Total	29.30%	33.94%	+4.64	47.21%	51.41%	+4.20	62.23%	63.94%	+1.71	60.78%	62.30%	+1.52

== Results ==
=== Overall ===
← Summary of the 22 March 2015 Parliament of Andalusia election results →
Parties and alliances	Popular vote			Seats	
Parties and alliances	Votes	%	±pp	Total	+/−
Spanish Socialist Workers' Party of Andalusia (PSOE–A)	1,411,278	35.41	−4.15	47	±0
People's Party (PP)	1,065,685	26.74	−13.93	33	−17
We Can (Podemos)	592,133	14.86	New	15	+15
Citizens–Party of the Citizenry (C's)	369,896	9.28	New	9	+9
United Left/The Greens–Assembly for Andalusia (IULV–CA)	274,426	6.89	−4.46	5	−7
Union, Progress and Democracy (UPyD)	76,839	1.93	−1.42	0	±0
Andalusian Party (PA)	60,645	1.52	−0.99	0	±0
Animalist Party Against Mistreatment of Animals (PACMA)	31,958	0.80	+0.57	0	±0
Vox (Vox)	18,422	0.46	New	0	±0
United Free Citizens (CILUS)	11,277	0.28	New	0	±0
Spanish Phalanx of the CNSO (FE de las JONS)	4,759	0.12	+0.06	0	±0
Zero Cuts (Recortes Cero)	3,566	0.09	New	0	±0
Communist Party of the Peoples of Spain (PCPE)	3,528	0.09	−0.02	0	±0
For a Fairer World (PUM+J)	1,984	0.05	+0.01	0	±0
Blank Seats (EB)	1,155	0.03	−0.12	0	±0
People's Welfare Party (PBG)	498	0.01	New	0	±0
Socialists and Republicans (SyR)	480	0.01	−0.01	0	±0
Labour and Justice Party (PTJ)	389	0.01	New	0	±0
Local and Global (LyG)	317	0.01	New	0	±0
Andalusian Nationalist People (PNdeA)	302	0.01	+0.01	0	±0
Neo-Democrats (Neodemócratas)	278	0.01	New	0	±0
Regionalist Party for Eastern Andalusia (PRAO)	254	0.01	−0.02	0	±0
Andalusian Solidary Independent Republican Party (RISA)	182	0.00	±0.00	0	±0
Change It (Cámbialo)	165	0.00	New	0	±0
Blank ballots	54,717	1.37	+0.46		
Total	3,985,133			109	±0
Valid votes	3,985,133	98.98	−0.44		
Invalid votes	41,149	1.02	+0.44		
Votes cast / turnout	4,026,282	62.30	+1.52		
Abstentions	2,436,345	37.70	−1.52		
Registered voters	6,462,627				

Popular vote
PSOE–A	35.41%
PP	26.74%
Podemos	14.86%
C's	9.28%
IULV–CA	6.89%
UPyD	1.93%
PA	1.52%
Others	2.00%
Blank ballots	1.37%

Seats
PSOE–A	43.12%
PP	30.28%
Podemos	13.76%
C's	8.27%
IULV–CA	4.59%

=== Distribution by constituency ===
Constituency	PSOE–A		PP		Podemos		C's		IULV–CA	
Constituency	%	S	%	S	%	S	%	S	%	S
Almería	32.9	5	36.9	5	11.0	1	9.4	1	4.2	−
Cádiz	31.6	6	24.0	4	18.9	3	10.4	1	6.7	1
Córdoba	35.9	5	27.3	4	12.6	1	7.7	1	10.0	1
Granada	34.6	5	30.0	4	13.9	2	9.6	1	6.1	1
Huelva	41.0	6	26.4	3	13.2	1	7.2	1	6.2	−
Jaén	42.7	6	29.1	4	11.1	1	6.0	–	5.7	−
Málaga	30.1	6	28.3	5	15.1	3	11.8	2	7.4	1
Seville	38.1	8	21.9	4	16.6	3	9.2	2	7.0	1
Total	35.4	47	26.7	33	14.9	15	9.3	9	6.9	5

=== Analysis ===
The result of the election was a hung parliament, with the PSOE winning the same number of seats it had previously—47. Still, it performed slightly better than what most polls had predicted, despite falling eight seats short of the absolute majority they had set as an objective. The PP plummeted to just 33 seats after scoring its best ever result in the 2012 election, suffering the burden of PM Mariano Rajoy's governance in the Spanish Government. This represented the party's worst result at a regional election in Andalusia since the 1990 election, falling below 30% of the vote. The main beneficiaries of the election were parties alternative to the considered "traditional" ones — Podemos and Citizens, both of them, despite polling slightly lower than what early polls predicted, winning seats for the first time in the Parliament of Andalusia.

== Aftermath ==
=== Reactions ===
The post-election scenario, however, turned more difficult than what was originally expected. IU collapse from 12 to 5 seats turned it into a minority force in the new parliament, preventing the PSOE from attempting a renewal of the 2012–2015 coalition—a scenario which IU itself refused, due to the abrupt dissolution of the previous agreement. The PP, initially widely expected to abstain in Susana Díaz's investiture voting in order to allow "a government of the most-voted party", announced instead that it would vote against Díaz's investiture.

=== Government formation ===
Newcomers Podemos and Citizens became decisive in the election of any future cabinet, yet remained reluctant to support a new PSOE government. The parties presented a series of harsh pre-agreement conditions, regarding political corruption and other issues, for the PSOE to comply with in order to allow for agreement talks:

- Podemos offered to support Díaz's investiture only if she forced the resignation of former presidents Manuel Chaves and José Antonio Griñán (which at the time were MPs in the Congress of Deputies and Senate, respectively) because of their responsibility in the ERE scandal; that political parties were turned into subsidiary responsible for ensuring that misused public money was returned; that the Andalusian government cancelled all agreements or accounts with financial institutions running housing evictions, as well as prompting legislation to prevent any future eviction; and finally, the readmission of personnel in education, health, equality and social welfare sectors fired as a result of the spending cuts, with a decrease in the number of party officials and advisers. In the event those conditions were not accepted, Podemos would vote against Díaz.
- Citizens (C's) demanded the immediate resignation of Chaves and Griñán before entering any talks with Susana Díaz's party. Party leader Albert Rivera, however, opened the door to allowing Díaz's investiture if that condition was met, but ruled out any possible entry into a future Díaz's government.
- The People's Party (PP) offered to easen Susana Díaz's investiture only if the PSOE allowed "the most-voted party" to rule in the local councils after the May local elections, as an attempt to prevent left-wing coalitions from withholding the PP from forming the government of the region's provincial capitals.

Susana Díaz immediately ruled out the PP conditions, requesting party regional leader Juanma Moreno to "act with responsibility, without pretending weird exchanges that the people would not understand". Moreno, in response, accused Díaz of "arrogancy" and told her that "with 47 seats one can't pretend to negotiate as if one had 55 [an absolute majority of seats]".

Susana Díaz's investiture for a second term as president of Andalusia remained unclear for one month. She explicitly expressed her intention to form a minority cabinet, ruling out a coalition with any other party; however, until June 2015 she was not able to prevent all other parties from blocking her election. Andalusian law established that if no candidate was elected president in the two months following the first investiture ballot, then parliament was to be automatically dissolved and a new election would be held no later than September 2015.

Investiture; Nomination of Susana Díaz (PSOE–A)
Ballot →	5 May 2015	8 May 2015	14 May 2015
Required majority →	55 out of 109	Simple	Simple
Yes: • PSOE–A (47)	47 / 109	47 / 109	47 / 109
No: • PP (33); • Podemos (15); • C's (9); • IULV–CA (5)	62 / 109	62 / 109	62 / 109
Abstentions	0 / 109	0 / 109	0 / 109
Absentees	0 / 109	0 / 109	0 / 109

Susana Díaz was unable to get a favorable vote in either of the three votings that took place in 5, 8 and 14 May, as all four PP, Podemos, C's and IU voted against her election. Further, negotiations between Díaz's PSOE and the opposition parties broke off when, on 13 May—the eve of the third investiture vote—it was unveiled that the Andalusian government had awarded the exploitation of the Aznalcóllar mine to a governmental-favored firm through illegal means and "without observing the slightest rigor" in February–March 2015, previously and during the regional election campaign. With Díaz's government refusing to give explanations over the scandal, all four parties reassured their negative to allow for Díaz's investiture in the 14 May vote, with then-acting president Susana Díaz blaming all four opposition parties of imposing a "political blockade" over Andalusia and threatening them with a new election in the event of her failing to get elected.

PP regional leader Juanma Moreno accused Díaz of "arrogance" and of "asking them to allow her investiture without yielding to their conditions", also asking himself why Díaz kept holding investiture votings if no inter-party agreement had been reached. Teresa Rodríguez from Podemos also criticised Díaz for not accepting her party's conditions, blaming the PSOE for the political instability in the region and stating that a new election would mean the PSOE's failure in forming a government through dialogue. All opposition parties also reiterated their position that they did not trust Díaz to fulfill any compromise once she did get elected.

New investiture votes were initially postponed until after the 24 May Spanish regional and local elections as a result of the electoral campaign centering the political focus. However, on 5 June, on the impossibility to have Díaz formally invested, the PSOE threatened the opposition parties with letting the legal time limit for the automatic dissolution of the parliament to expire should an agreement not be reached with anyone before Tuesday, 9 June. In the end, the PSOE and C's reached an agreement, with the latter accepting to support Díaz to end the parliamentary deadlock and prevent a new election, lifting off their requirement for Chaves and Griñan's resignations before considering to enter negotiations with the PSOE.

Investiture; Nomination of Susana Díaz (PSOE–A)
Ballot →	11 June 2015
Required majority →	Simple
Yes: • PSOE–A (47); • C's (9)	56 / 109
No: • PP (31); • Podemos (15); • IULV–CA (5)	51 / 109
Abstentions	0 / 109
Absentees: • PP (2)	2 / 109

== Bibliography ==
- Ley Orgánica 5/1985, de 19 de junio, del Régimen Electoral General (Organic Law 5/1985). Official State Gazette (in Spanish). 19 June 1985 [version as of 22 September 2012]. BOE-A-1985-11672.
- Ley 1/1986, de 2 de enero, Electoral de Andalucía (Law 1/1986). Official State Gazette (in Spanish). 2 January 1986 [version as of 28 October 2014]. BOE-A-1986-2788.
- Ley 6/2006, de 24 de octubre, del Gobierno de la Comunidad Autónoma de Andalucía (Law 6/2006). Official State Gazette (in Spanish). 24 October 2006 [version as of 30 June 2014]. BOE-A-2006-20848.
- Ley Orgánica 2/2007, de 19 de marzo, de reforma del Estatuto de Autonomía para Andalucía (Organic Law 2/2007). Official State Gazette (in Spanish). 19 March 2007 [version as of 11 April 2011]. BOE-A-2007-5825.
- Decreto de la Presidenta 1/2015, de 26 de enero, de disolución del Parlamento de Andalucía y de convocatoria de elecciones (PDF) (Decree 1/2015). Official Gazette of the Regional Government of Andalusia (in Spanish). 26 January 2015. 00062638.
