= 1980 Andalusian autonomy initiative referendum =

Referendum in the Spanish region of Andalusia

- 28 February 1980
- "Do you agree to the ratification of the initiative, provided for in Article 151 of the Constitution, for the purpose of transacting it by the procedure provided in that article?"

Results
| Choice | Votes | % |
|---|---|---|
| Yes | 2,472,287 | 94.19% |
| No | 152,438 | 5.81% |
| Valid votes | 2,624,725 | 92.29% |
| Invalid or blank votes | 219,237 | 7.71% |
| Total votes | 2,843,962 | 100.00% |
| Registered voters/turnout | 4,430,356 | 64.19% |

A referendum on the initiative of the Andalusian autonomy process was held in Andalusia on Thursday, 28 February 1980. Voters were asked whether they ratified a proposed initiative for the provinces of Almería, Cádiz, Córdoba, Granada, Huelva, Jaén, Málaga and Seville to organize themselves into an autonomous community of Spain throughout the legal procedure outlined in Article 151 of the Spanish Constitution of 1978.

The referendum resulted in 94.2% of valid votes in support of the bill on a turnout of 64.2%. However, the "Yes" vote failed to reach the required 50% majority in the province of Almería—garnering 42.3% of the electorate under a turnout of 51.1%—resulting in a deadlock of several months until an inter-party agreement resulted in legal amendments allowing the autonomy process to continue as envisaged under Article 151.

== Legal framework ==
Articles 143 and 151 of the Spanish Constitution of 1978 provided for two ordinary procedures for regions to access autonomy status:

- The "slow-track" route of Article 143, whose initiative required the approval of the corresponding Provincial or Island Councils as well as two-thirds of all municipalities which comprised, at least, a majority of the population in each province or island. Devolution for autonomous communities constituted through this procedure was limited for a period of at least five years from the adoption of the Statute of Autonomy.
- The "fast-track" route of Article 151, whose initiative required the approval of the corresponding Provincial or Island Councils; three-fourths of all municipalities which comprised, at least, a majority of the population in each province or island; as well as its subsequent ratification through referendum requiring the affirmative vote of at least the absolute majority of all those eligible to vote. This procedure was also provided under Article 8 of the Organic Law 2/1980, of 18 January, on the regulation of the different forms of referendums. Transitory Provision Second of the Constitution waived these requirements for the "historical regions" which had statutes of autonomy approved by voters during the Second Spanish Republic, namely: Catalonia (1931), the Basque Country (1933) and Galicia (1936).

Once initiated, failure in securing the requirements laid out in each of these procedures determined a five-year period during which the corresponding provinces or islands would not be able to apply for autonomy under the same Article. Additionally, Article 144 provided for an exceptional procedure under which the Cortes Generales could, because of "national interest reasons": a) Authorize the constitution of an autonomous community when its territorial scope did not exceed that of a province and did not meet the requirements of Article 143; b) Authorize the approval of statutes of autonomy for territories not integrated into the provincial organization; and c) Replace the local councils' initiative referred to in Article 143.

The electoral procedures of the referendum came regulated under Royal Decree-Law 20/1977, of 18 March, and its related legal provisions. Voting was on the basis of universal suffrage, which comprised all nationals over eighteen, registered in the provinces of Almería, Cádiz, Córdoba, Granada, Huelva, Jaén, Málaga and Seville and in full enjoyment of their civil and political rights. The question asked was "Do you agree to the ratification of the initiative, provided for in Article 151 of the Constitution, for the purpose of transacting it by the procedure provided in that article?" (Spanish: ¿Da usted su acuerdo a la ratificación de la iniciativa, prevista en el articulo 151 de la Constitución, a efectos de su tramitación por el procedimiento previsto en dicho articulo?).

== Background ==
The Andalusian autonomic process had its roots in a number of events throughout the late 19th and early 20th centuries that fueled Andalusian nationalism: the 1868 Glorious Revolution, the 1873 Cantonal Revolution, the 1883 Federal Constitution for Andalusia (nicknamed as the "Constitution of Antequera") and the Blas Infante-led autonomist movement between 1910 and 1936, with the 1918 Assembly of Ronda adopting a regional flag and emblem, the 1919 Assembly of Córdoba or the Centros Andaluces (English: "Andalusian Centers"). The proclamation of the Second Spanish Republic led to the 1932 meetings of the Provincial Council of Seville, when a draft statute of autonomy was written to comply with the regulations provided under the Spanish Constitution of 1931; however, this initial process of autonomy died down with the outbreak of the Spanish Civil War and the execution of Infante by Francoist forces.

Prospects for attaining autonomy returned after Francisco Franco's death in 1975 and the start of the Spanish transition to democracy. On 12 October 1977, an Assembly of Parliamentarians was constituted based on that year's general election results in the region—7 seats for the Spanish Socialist Workers' Party (PSOE), 7 for the Union of the Democratic Centre (UCD), 2 for the Communist Party of Spain (PCE) and 2 for independent progressive groups—with the intent of establishing a pre-autonomic regime for Andalusia. Massive pro-autonomy demonstrations on 4 December 1977—1.4 million attended throughout the eight Andalusian provinces—set a turning point in the autonomic aspirations of the Andalusian people. After some initial delay, a pre-autonomic Regional Government of Andalusia (Spanish: Junta de Andalucía) was adopted in April 1978, with Socialist Plácido Fernández Viagas being elected as the first president of Andalusia. On 4 December 1978, all political parties committed to achieving the greatest possible level of devolution for Andalusia in the shortest possible timeframe within the scope of the newly approved Spanish Constitution of 1978, in what was to be known as the "Pact of Antequera" (Spanish: Pacto de Antequera).

Poor progress on the issue of the Andalusian autonomy resulted in significant gains for the nationalist Socialist Party of Andalusia (PSA) in the 1979 general and local elections, as well as in a change of leadership in the pre-autonomic government, as Fernández Viagas was replaced by PSOE's Rafael Escuredo on 2 June 1979. Under Escuredo, the region initiated the procedures for applying to autonomy through the "fast-track route" set down in Article 151 of the Constitution, including the drafting of a new statute of autonomy, as well as the approval of the autonomy initiative by the municipalities of all eight Andalusian provinces. By December 1979, 100% of the municipalities of the provinces of Seville, Cádiz, Córdoba and Jaén, 96.03% of Almería's, 94% of Huelva's, 93.37% of Granada's and 92.9% of Malaga's had approved the initiative for applying through the procedure of Article 151.

As the governing UCD's stance started to swing against a general application of Article 151, the PSOE-led regional government launched a campaign in support of Andalusian autonomy and self-government. The obstacles put forward by Prime Minister Adolfo Suárez's party and government to Andalucia accessing autonomy through the route of Article 151 were denounced, such as delaying the date for holding the mandatory referendum on the autonomy initiative, or the questioning of the draft Statute which had been negotiated by the parties. Finally in January 1980, seeking to "rationalize" the autonomic process of all future autonomous regions over concerns that all would attempt to achieve maximum devolution within a short timeframe, the UCD officially made public its stance not to support the route of Article 151 for regions other than the Basque Country, Catalonia and Galicia, instead suggesting the application of the "slow-track" route of Article 143; a decision which included Andalusia.

== Date ==
The date for the referendum on the autonomy initiative to be held was negotiated by the various parties with representation in the pre-autonomic Andalusian institutions, PSOE, UCD, PCE and PSA. Originally scheduled for some point in late 1979, such as 25 October (concurrently with the Basque and Catalan Statute of Autonomy referendums) or 4 December (the second anniversary of the 1977 demonstrations), the date was moved into early 1980, either on 28 February or 1 March.

The UCD government had announced that the date was still dependent on the final approval by the Cortes Generales of the Referendum Law—providing the legal framework for referendums on autonomy initiatives as the one scheduled for Andalusia—with the implication that the referendum could be delayed beyond 28 February, leading Andalusian president Rafael Escuredo to threaten with his resignation, conditional on the referendum not being held as scheduled. Mounting pressure on the national government led to the approval of the Referendum Law in time for the Andalusian vote to be held as scheduled, with plans maintained after UCD's rejection to support the autonomy initiative increasing the hardships for it to be successful.

The referendum was formally called upon the publication of the specific decree in the Official State Gazette on 28 January 1980, with the date being confirmed for Thursday, 28 February.

== Campaign ==
After the UCD's u-turn on the autonomy process in January 1980, when it advocated for voters to either abstain or cast blank ballots in the autonomy initiative referendums held under the provisions of Article 151 of the Constitution, internal differences emerged within the regional party as some members—including former minister of Culture and regional party president Manuel Clavero—came out in support of Article 151 by announcing a "Yes" vote, while others adhered to the national party's stance.

The PSOE government of Andalusia came to criticize the UCD over alleged obstacles in the referendum campaign, including the short duration of the propaganda campaign—15 days—the ambiguity of the question (abstent of words such as "autonomy" or "Andalusia", in what would be later described as an attempt to promote confusion and abstention), a shortage in public funding for the institutional campaign and limitations in the allocation and broadcasting of media spaces in the public RTVE corporation, which was seen as discriminatory compared to the campaigns for the Basque and Catalan referendums. The Spanish government defended its position on the referendum question and campaign's duration out of "technical and legal rigor" reasons while justifying the limitations to the use of RTVE broadcasting media over an alleged lack of institutional neutrality of the Regional Government's campaign, oriented in favor of the "Yes" vote. This stance would lead to a three-day hunger strike from President Rafael Escuredo, terminated as a result of a stark worsening in Escuredo's health. Accusations on the UCD national government's attempts to undermine the referendum's logistics would keep going over further limitations in public funding for institutional advertising to 125 million Pta, a delay in the regulation of postal voting and the introduction of a different model of ballot to those used in the Basque and Catalan votes.

Party policies
| Position | Parties | Ref. |
|---|---|---|
| Yes | Spanish Socialist Workers' Party (PSOE) | |
| Yes | Communist Party of Spain (PCE) | |
| Yes | Socialist Party of Andalusia–Andalusian Party (PSA–PA) | |
| Yes | Party of Labour of Spain (PTE) | |
| Yes | Communist Movement (MC) | |
| Yes | Andalusian Christian Democracy (DCA) | |
| Yes | Communist Organization of Spain (Red Flag) (OCE–BR) | |
| Yes | Liberation Front of Andalusia (FLA) | |
| No | New Force (FN) | |
| No | Spanish Phalanx of the CNSO (FE–JONS) | |
| No | Spanish Democratic Right (DDE) | |
| Abstention | Union of the Democratic Centre (UCD) | |
| Abstention | People's Alliance (AP) | |

The Spanish government's decree on complementary regulations for the referendum, approved on 8 February, showed differences with those provided for the Basque and Catalan referendums, such as a limitation of the free spaces awarded to political parties in nationwide media or a restriction in the regional president of Andalusia's possibilities of making use of RTVE media—mainly Televisión Española and Radio Nacional de España—for campaigning in favour of the "Yes" vote. Despite these shortcomings, the Andalusian government organized an institutional campaign under the Vota Andalucía nuestra slogan (English: "Vote, our Andalusia") to encourage turnout in the referendum, including the placement of advertisements and billboards throughout the entire region, informative car caravans in the rural areas and the personal involvement in the campaign of Escuredo himself. Delays in the payment of the promised campaign public funding from the national Treasury were compensated through loans or economic help offered by other institutions.

The parties supporting the "Yes" campaign (mainly the PSOE, PCE and PSA) launched a massive effort with more than 1,000 announced rallies, billboards in the eight Andalusian provincial capitals, radio spots, press announcements, posters and distribution of millions of stickers and leaflets, with a particular focus in the easternmost province of Almería, where the success of the "Yes" campaign was more dubious over fears of not meeting the legal electorate requirements for ratification. The Assembly of Parliamentarians had convened on 9 February with the attendance of PSOE, PCE and PSA members and the absence of UCD, ahead of the start of official campaigning, to approve a joint resolution denouncing the national government's policy of boycott to the "Yes" campaign and urging voters to throw their support behind it. UCD and AP, defenders of abstention in the referendum, initially limited their campaigns to the use of their legal rights in the media—mainly their corresponding press, radio and television free spaces—to present their arguments contrary to Article 151. The only party campaigning for the "No" vote was the far-right New Force (FN), which claimed that the proposed autonomy was "marxist and separatist", instead advocating for an "agile and efficient administrative decentralization".

Party slogans
| Parties | Original slogan | English translation | Ref. |
|---|---|---|---|
| PSOE | « Por derecho » | "By right" | |
| UCD | « Andaluz, éste no es tu referéndum » | "Andalusian, this is not your referendum" | |
| PCE | « Que no le falte tu voto » | "So that your vote is not missed" | |
| PSA–PA | « Votar sí es votar por tu tierra » | "Voting Yes means voting for your land" | |
| FN | « La unidad engrandece, el separatismo destruye » | "Unity magnifies, separatism destroys" | |

Several UCD members and local groupings unheeded their party's official stance and campaigned for either the "Yes" vote or for encouraging turnout, while others abandoned the party outright—including former UCD regional leader Manuel Clavero—as criticism of the Spanish government's administrative obstacles kept increasing throughout the campaign. Public perception of a "Yes" success increased as the campaign progressed, with the UCD changing its strategy by doubling its advertising against Article 151 and sending about half of its ministers to Andalusia to campaign in favour of abstention, while engaging in a more organized propaganda campaign, increasingly aware that the referendum had turned into an electoral test on the Suárez government as many Andalusian voters, previously indifferent or neutral on the issue of autonomy, were being driven to protest against the tactics of the ruling party against the "Yes" campaign.

== Results ==
=== Overall ===
Question

Do you agree to the ratification of the initiative, provided for in Article 151 of the Constitution, for the purpose of transacting it by the procedure provided in that article?

| Choice | Votes | % |
|---|---|---|
| For | 2,472,287 | 94.19 |
| Against | 152,438 | 5.81 |
| Total | 2,624,725 | 100.00 |
| Valid votes | 2,624,725 | 92.29 |
| Invalid/blank votes | 219,237 | 7.71 |
| Total votes | 2,843,962 | 100.00 |
| Registered voters/turnout | 4,430,356 | 64.19 |
Source: Regional Government of Andalusia

=== Results by province ===
| Province | Electorate | Turnout | Yes | | No | | Majority requirement |
| Province | Electorate | Turnout | Votes | % | Votes | % | Majority requirement |
|---|---|---|---|---|---|---|---|
| Almería | 279,300 | 51.12 | 118,186 | 91.42 | 11,092 | 8.58 | 42.32 |
| Cádiz | 664,109 | 61.36 | 367,065 | 96.47 | 13,412 | 3.53 | 55.27 |
| Córdoba | 521,027 | 69.60 | 312,419 | 93.89 | 20,339 | 6.11 | 59.96 |
| Granada | 535,926 | 62.52 | 283,777 | 93.27 | 20,491 | 6.73 | 52.95 |
| Huelva | 307,943 | 60.64 | 165,976 | 96.06 | 6,808 | 3.94 | 53.90 |
| Jaén | 468,804 | 63.25 | 234,746 | 88.80 | 29,610 | 11.20 | 50.07 |
| Málaga | 661,825 | 59.29 | 346,819 | 94.34 | 20,822 | 5.66 | 52.40 |
| Seville | 991,422 | 72.66 | 643,299 | 95.56 | 29,864 | 4.44 | 64.89 |
| Total | 4,430,356 | 64.19 | 2,472,287 | 94.19 | 152,438 | 5.81 | 55.80 |

== Aftermath ==
Despite early predictions of a defeat of the "Yes" campaign in up to four provinces, the higher-than-expected turnout and the early counts confirmed an outright victory for the "Yes" vote in six out of the eight provinces, with doubts over the definitive results in Almería and Jaén. Initial tallies showing a defeat of the initiative in these two provinces were met with satisfaction within the UCD as an endorsement to their Article 143 policy, whereas the Regional Government of Andalusia regarded the outcome as "a political and moral victory" and the PSOE considered the results as the manifestation of a unanimous desire for broad self-government. However, later analyses on the high turnout revealed that many UCD voters had not adhered to their party's call for abstention, with results being interpreted as a massive blow to the governing party in Spain, leading to a plummeting of the party's public image in the region. Days after the referendum, the UCD executive committee acknowledged "errors" in the management of its campaign.

The results in Almería and Jaén were contested by the "Yes" supporters: in the former, it was claimed that a large number of deceased people was shown as registered, inflating the census data and thus preventing the success of the initiative; whereas in the later, the closeness of results—with the "Yes" vote at 49.3% of the electorate—led to claims over counted ballots in several wards. As the UCD sought to initiate procedures for the application of Article 143, "Yes" supporters rejected these plans and advocated for results to be declared void in Almería and for a new vote to be held in the province, with renewed calls after an official recount resulted in the "Yes" vote surpassing the 50% threshold in the province of Jaén.

The deadlock, which threatened to bog down the entire autonomic process, was resolved in October 1980 through two legal amendments under the cover of Article 144 of the Constitution: the first, a modification of the Referendum Law allowing for the approval of the Article 151 autonomy initiative in the provinces having met the 50%-over-electorate threshold, and the possibility to make the initiative extendable to those provinces within the same region not meeting this requirement—such as the case of Almería—as long as it was requested by a majority of the elected members of that province within the Cortes Generales; the second, an organic law approving this mechanism for the province of Almería by applying it retroactively to the 28 February referendum result. Both amendments would be definitely approved by the Cortes Generales on 11 November 1980, leading to the final phase of negotiations over the draft Statute and its subsequent ratification in the 1981 referendum. Attempts to avoid similar political clashes in the future over the devolution issue led to the so-called "rationalization" of the autonomic process, through the signing of the first autonomic pacts between UCD and PSOE on 31 July 1981, agreeing for a joint calendar of devolution for the remaining regions. This would be embodied through the approval, in 1982, of the Organic Law of Harmonization of the Autonomic Process (LOAPA).

The outcome of the 1980 referendum would have a long-lasting impact in Andalusia. Despite the UCD later acknowledging its "Andalusian mistake" of rejecting the route of Article 151 for the Andalusian autonomy, the Spanish government's tactics throughout the referendum campaign and the outcome of the vote would see the party's popularity in the region destroyed, never to recover. In the Spanish Senate by-elections held on 27 November 1980 in the provinces of Almería and Seville, the UCD vote collapsed as the PSOE emerged as the largest party in both elections, whereas the first Andalusian regional election in May 1982 would see the establishment of a PSOE regional hegemony that would last for decades to come and the obliberation of UCD as a valid government alternative. 28 February would be institutionalized as the new Andalusia Day from 1982 onwards, in remembrance of the referendum outcome and the success of the autonomy process.

== See also ==
- 1979 Basque Statute of Autonomy referendum
- 1979 Catalan Statute of Autonomy referendum
- 1980 Galician Statute of Autonomy referendum
- 1981 Andalusian Statute of Autonomy referendum
