= 1979 Catalan Statute of Autonomy referendum =

Referendum in the Spanish region of Catalonia

- 25 October 1979
- "Do you approve of the Statute of Autonomy of Catalonia Bill?"

Results
Choice	Votes	%
Yes	2,327,038	91.91%
No	204,957	8.09%
Valid votes	2,531,995	95.91%
Invalid or blank votes	107,956	4.09%
Total votes	2,639,951	100.00%
Registered voters/turnout	4,451,796	59.3%

A referendum on the approval of the Catalan Statute of Autonomy was held in Catalonia on Thursday, 25 October 1979. Voters were asked whether they ratified a proposed Statute of Autonomy of Catalonia bill organizing the provinces of Barcelona, Gerona, Lérida and Tarragona into an autonomous community of Spain. The final draft of the bill had been approved by the Catalan Assembly of Parliamentarians on 29 December 1978, and by the Congress of Deputies on 13 August 1979, but it required ratification through a binding referendum and its subsequent approval by the Spanish Cortes Generales, as established by Article 151 of the Spanish Constitution of 1978. The referendum was held simultaneously with a similar vote in the Basque Country.

The referendum resulted in 91.9% of valid votes in support of the bill on a turnout of 59.3%. Once approved, the bill was submitted to the consideration of the Cortes Generales, which accepted it on 29 November (in the Congress of Deputies) and 12 December (in the Spanish Senate), receiving royal assent on 18 December and published in the Official State Gazette on 22 December 1979.

== Legal framework ==
Articles 143 and 151 of the Spanish Constitution of 1978 provided for two ordinary procedures for regions to access autonomy status:

- The "slow-track" route of Article 143, whose initiative required the approval of the corresponding Provincial or Island Councils as well as two-thirds of all municipalities which comprised, at least, a majority of the population in each province or island. Devolution for autonomous communities constituted through this procedure was limited for a period of at least five years from the adoption of the Statute of Autonomy.
- The "fast-track" route of Article 151, whose initiative required the approval of the corresponding Provincial or Island Councils; three-fourths of all municipalities which comprised, at least, a majority of the population in each province or island; as well as its subsequent ratification through referendum requiring the affirmative vote of at least the absolute majority of all those eligible to vote. Transitory Provision Second of the Constitution waived these requirements for the "historical regions" which had statutes of autonomy approved by voters during the Second Spanish Republic, namely: Catalonia (1931), the Basque Country (1933) and Galicia (1936).

Once initiated, failure in securing the requirements laid out in each of these procedures determined a five-year period during which the corresponding provinces or islands would not be able to apply for autonomy under the same Article. Additionally, Article 144 provided for an exceptional procedure under which the Cortes Generales could, because of "national interest reasons": a) Authorize the constitution of an autonomous community when its territorial scope did not exceed that of a province and did not meet the requirements of Article 143; b) Authorize the approval of statutes of autonomy for territories not integrated into the provincial organization; and c) Replace the local councils' initiative referred to in Article 143.

Draft statutes of autonomy approved under the procedure outlined in Article 151 of the Constitution required for its subsequent ratification in referendum, once ruled favourably by the Constitutional Commission of the Congress of Deputies. Under such Article, the ratification required the affirmative vote of at least a majority of those validly issued.

The electoral procedures of the referendum came regulated under Royal Decree-Law 20/1977, of 18 March, and its related legal provisions. Voting was on the basis of universal suffrage, which comprised all nationals over eighteen, registered in the provinces of Barcelona, Gerona, Lérida and Tarragona and in full enjoyment of their civil and political rights. The question asked was "Do you approve of the Statute of Autonomy of Catalonia Bill?" (Spanish: ¿Aprueba el proyecto de Estatuto de autonomía de Cataluña?).

== Background ==
Historical precedents for Catalan autonomy after the Nueva Planta decrees of 1714 dated back to the Spanish Draft Constitution of 1873, with Catalonia as one out of the seventeen projected states within the Spanish federal state; the Commonwealth of Catalonia established in 1914 as the only such provincial association that came to exist; and finally as an autonomous region during the Second Spanish Republic. In 1931, the Government of Catalonia (Catalan: Generalitat de Catalunya) was restored, followed by the approval of a Statute of Autonomy in 1932 which was of application until the outbreak of the Spanish Civil War and the disestablishment of the Second Republic, when Catalan autonomy was suppressed by the Francoist regime.

The death of dictator Francisco Franco in 1975 and the start of the Spanish transition to democracy led to negotiations between the Spanish government under then Prime Minister Adolfo Suárez and Catalan president-in-exile Josep Tarradellas over the issue of Catalan autonomy. Political conflict arose between the Catalan opposition, which aimed at re-establishing the 1932 Statute, and Josep Tarradellas, who still considered himself the valid representative of the Government of Catalonia and aimed for its restoration with himself at its helm. After the 1977 Spanish general election an agreement was reached between the Spanish government, Tarradellas and the newly constituted Assembly of Parliamentarians, resulted in the second restoration of the regional Catalan government on 5 October 1977 and in Tarradella's return to Catalonia on 23 October. The new Catalan statute of autonomy would be drafted throughout 1978, and on 29 December the so-called "Statute of Sau" (Catalan: Estatut de Sau) was submitted to the Constitutional Commission of the Congress of Deputies for its review as outlined under Article 151. The period was dominated by numerous disagreements within the Government of Catalonia—where an all-party cabinet had been formed—between President Tarradellas and the parties commanding a majority in the Assembly of Parliamentarians, the Socialists' Party of Catalonia (PSC) and the Unified Socialist Party of Catalonia (PSUC), which had seen attempts from Tarradellas to delay the Statute's submittal to the Cortes until after the first ordinary Spanish general election in 1979.

The parliamentary transaction of the proposed Statute bogged down for some months as a result of the dissolution of the Cortes Generales to hold the 1979 general election on 1 March and electoral campaigning for the subsequent local elections on 3 April, and again after the governing Union of the Democratic Centre (UCD) sought to amend the proposed text in June 1979 to limit the extent of devolution on a number of issues, such as language, justice, education, economy, electoral system and public order. The final draft would be passed by the Constitutional Commission on 13 August 1979 after lengthy negotiations between the Catalan parties and Adolfo Suárez's government; the resulting text would be described by most Catalan politicians as improving on the level of devolution of that of 1932, though Tarradellas would express his disagreement over it.

== Date ==
The date for the referendum of ratification of the Statute was set immediately after its approval in the Cortes Generales, being approved by decree by the Council of Ministers on 14 September 1979 and published in the Official State Gazette on 24 September. The referendum date was scheduled for Thursday, 25 October 1979, to be held concurrently with the referendum on the Basque Statute of Autonomy.

== Campaign ==
Party policies
Position	Parties	Ref.
Yes	Socialists' Party of Catalonia (PSC–PSOE)	
Yes	Union of the Democratic Centre (UCD)	
Yes	Union of the Centre of Catalonia (UCC)	
Yes	Unified Socialist Party of Catalonia (PSUC)	
Yes	Democratic Convergence of Catalonia (CDC)	
Yes	Democratic Union of Catalonia (UDC)	
Yes	Republican Left of Catalonia (ERC)	
Yes	Party of Labour of Catalonia (PTC–PTE)	
Yes	Catalan State (EC)	
No	Left Bloc for National Liberation (BEAN)	
No	New Force (FN)	
No	Communist Movement of Catalonia (MCC)	
Abstention	Revolutionary Communist League (LCR)	

President Josep Tarradellas was initially opposed to supporting the Statute, affirming that it had been drafted "by some gentlement from the [political] parties and by Prime Minister Suárez" and that it was "not an agreement, but a diktat"; however, pressure from several regional ministers led to Tarradellas reluctantly accepting that the Executive Council recommended a "Yes" vote for the text ahead of the referendum. The regional Government launched an institutional campaign for the referendum under the "Vote the Statute" slogan (Spanish: Vote el Estatuto). The People's Alliance (AP) did not recommend any explicit choice for the Statute and gave freedom of vote to its supporters. The Socialist Party of Andalusia–Andalusian Party (PSA–PA) issued a manifesto during the campaign where it aimed for the Andalusian community in Catalonia to "have their rights guaranteed as a community with their own personality".

== Opinion polls ==
The table below lists voting intention estimates in reverse chronological order, showing the most recent first and using the dates when the survey fieldwork was done, as opposed to the date of publication. Where the fieldwork dates are unknown, the date of publication is given instead. The highest percentage figure in each polling survey is displayed with its background shaded in the leading choice's colour. The "Lead" columns on the right show the percentage-point difference between the "Yes" and "No" choices in a given poll.

Polling firm/Commissioner	Fieldwork date	Sample size	Total						Considering only Yes/No totals		
Polling firm/Commissioner	Fieldwork date	Sample size	Yes	No	Invalid/ Blank	☒	Question	Lead	Yes	No	Lead
1979 referendum	25 Oct 1979	—N/a	52.3	4.6	2.4	40.7	–	47.7	91.9	8.1	83.8
Regional Government	18 Oct 1979	?	67.1	9.0	–	–	23.9	58.1	88.2	11.8	76.4
Emopública/CIS	15–18 Oct 1979	1,200	53.0	1.0	1.0	10.0	35.0	52.0	98.1	1.9	96.2
Emopública/CIS	10–14 Oct 1979	1,200	50.3	1.6	1.5	9.8	36.8	48.7	96.9	3.1	93.8

== Results ==
=== Overall ===
Question

Do you approve of the Statute of Autonomy of Catalonia Bill?

Choice	Votes	%
For	2,327,038	91.91
Against	204,957	8.09
Total	2,531,995	100.00
Valid votes	2,531,995	95.91
Invalid/blank votes	107,956	4.09
Total votes	2,639,951	100.00
Registered voters/turnout	4,451,796	59.30
Source: Government of Catalonia

=== Results by province ===
Province	Electorate	Turnout	Yes		No	
Province	Electorate	Turnout	Votes	%	Votes	%
Barcelona	3,463,135	59.51	1,813,657	91.67	164,864	8.33
Gerona	337,629	63.36	191,223	93.49	13,322	6.51
Lérida	265,083	58.23	139,308	94.15	8,658	5.85
Tarragona	385,949	54.58	182,850	90.99	18,113	9.01
Total	4,451,796	59.30	2,327,038	91.91	204,957	8.09

== Aftermath ==
The referendum resulted in the Statute being ratified by a wide margin, but the low turnout of 59.3%—partly attributed to bad weather during voting day—and the perceived poor preparations on the referendum logistics from the Government of Catalonia were met with disappointment within the Catalan political class. The Statute was brought to the Cortes Generales for its final ratification: the Congress would pass it on 29 November, the Senate would do likewise on 12 December, and the text would receive royal assent on 18 December to be published in the Official State Gazette on the 22nd. After speculation on whether President Tarradellas would choose to trigger a government crisis that could delay the first regional election indefinitely, negotiations with the central government resulted in it being scheduled for 20 March 1980.

The Statute of Sau would allow Catalonia to acquire one of the highest levels of autonomy in Comparative Law, but it would also eventually lead to political conflict as other regions would attempt to achieve the same level of autonomy as that of the "historical regions". In January 1980, seeking to "rationalize" the autonomic process of all future autonomous regions over concerns that all would attempt to achieve maximum devolution within a short timeframe, the governing UCD officially would make public that it would not support the route of Article 151 for regions other than Catalonia, the Basque Country and Galicia, instead suggesting the application of the "slow-track" route of Article 143, which would eventually to the party's defeat in the Andalusian autonomy initiative referendum, as well as to the signing of the first autonomic pacts between UCD and PSOE on 31 July 1981, would see the agreement for a joint calendar of devolution for the remaining regions. This would be embodied through the approval, in 1982, of the Organic Law of Harmonization of the Autonomic Process (LOAPA).

== See also ==
- 1980 Andalusian autonomy initiative referendum
- 1980 Galician Statute of Autonomy referendum
- 1981 Andalusian Statute of Autonomy referendum
