= 1980 Galician Statute of Autonomy referendum =

Referendum in the Spanish region of Galicia

- 21 December 1980
- "Do you approve of the Statute of Autonomy of Galicia Bill?"

Results
Choice	Votes	%
Yes	450,556	78.77%
No	121,448	21.23%
Valid votes	572,004	93.13%
Invalid or blank votes	42,214	6.87%
Total votes	614,218	100.00%
Registered voters/turnout	2,172,898	28.27%

A referendum on the approval of the Galician Statute of Autonomy was held in Galicia on Sunday, 21 December 1980. Voters were asked whether they ratified a proposed Statute of Autonomy for Galicia bill organizing the provinces of La Coruña, Lugo, Orense and Pontevedra into an autonomous community of Spain. The final draft of the bill had been approved following an inter-party agreement on 26 September 1980, but it required ratification through a binding referendum and its subsequent approval by the Spanish Cortes Generales, as established under Article 151 of the Spanish Constitution of 1978.

The referendum resulted in 78.8% of valid votes in support of the bill on a turnout of just 28.3%. Once approved, the bill was submitted to the consideration of the Cortes Generales, which accepted it on 17 February 1981 (in the Congress of Deputies) and 17 March (in the Spanish Senate), receiving royal assent on 6 April and published in the Official State Gazette on 28 April 1981.

== Legal framework ==
Articles 143 and 151 of the Spanish Constitution of 1978 provided for two ordinary procedures for regions to access autonomy status:

- The "slow-track" route of Article 143, whose initiative required the approval of the corresponding Provincial or Island Councils as well as two-thirds of all municipalities which comprised, at least, a majority of the population in each province or island. Devolution for autonomous communities constituted through this procedure was limited for a period of at least five years from the adoption of the Statute of Autonomy.
- The "fast-track" route of Article 151, whose initiative required the approval of the corresponding Provincial or Island Councils; three-fourths of all municipalities which comprised, at least, a majority of the population in each province or island; as well as its subsequent ratification through referendum requiring the affirmative vote of at least the absolute majority of all those eligible to vote. Transitory Provision Second of the Constitution waived these requirements for the "historical regions" which had statutes of autonomy approved by voters during the Second Spanish Republic, namely: Catalonia (1931), the Basque Country (1933) and Galicia (1936).

Once initiated, failure in securing the requirements laid out in each of these procedures determined a five-year period during which the corresponding provinces or islands would not be able to apply for autonomy under the same Article. Additionally, Article 144 provided for an exceptional procedure under which the Cortes Generales could, because of "national interest reasons": a) Authorize the constitution of an autonomous community when its territorial scope did not exceed that of a province and did not meet the requirements of Article 143; b) Authorize the approval of statutes of autonomy for territories not integrated into the provincial organization; and c) Replace the local councils' initiative referred to in Article 143.

Draft statutes of autonomy approved under the procedure outlined in Article 151 of the Constitution required for its subsequent ratification in referendum, once ruled favourably by the Constitutional Commission of the Congress of Deputies. Under Article 9 of the Organic Law 2/1980, of 18 January, on the regulation of the different forms of referendums, the ratification required the affirmative vote of at least a majority of those validly issued. In the absence of such a majority in one or several provinces, those voting favourably could constitute themselves into an autonomous community of their own, provided that:

1. The provinces were bordering.
2. That it was decided to continue the statutory process by virtue of an agreement adopted by the absolute majority of the Assembly of Parliamentarians corresponding to the provinces that had voted affirmatively on the draft. In this case, the draft Statute was to be transacted as an Organic Law by the Cortes Generales for the sole purpose of its adaptation to the new territorial scope.
3. If the referendum result had been negative in most or all of the provinces, no new Statute would be drafted for a time lapse of five years, notwithstanding those provinces that, having voted affirmatively, chose to constitute themselves into an autonomous community of their own.

The electoral procedures of the referendum came regulated under Royal Decree-Law 20/1977, of 18 March, and its related legal provisions. Voting was on the basis of universal suffrage, which comprised all nationals over eighteen, registered in the provinces of La Coruña, Lugo, Orense and Pontevedra and in full enjoyment of their civil and political rights. The question asked was "Do you approve of the Statute of Autonomy of Galicia Bill?" (Spanish: ¿Aprueba el proyecto de Estatuto de Autonomía para Galicia?).

== Background ==
Negotiations for a new statute of autonomy for Galicia had its roots in the 1936 Statute, voted in referendum and submitted to the Spanish parliament for ratification, but never implemented due to the outbreak of the Spanish Civil War. Galicia was granted a pre-autonomic regime after Francisco Franco's death in 1975 and during the Spanish transition to democracy, together with the Valencian Country, Aragon and the Canary Islands based on the examples of Catalonia and the Basque Country. The re-establishment of the Regional Government of Galicia (Galician: Xunta de Galicia) was formalized with its official approval on 18 March 1978 and the appointment of the first regional government in June that year. The subsequent Spanish Constitution of 1978 and the celebration in Spain of the first ordinary general election paved the way for the re-establishment of the "historical communities" of the Basque Country, Catalonia and Galicia under the "fast-track" procedure of Article 151 of the Constitution, setting the first steps for the institutionalization of the so-called "State of the Autonomies".

For Galicia, an Assembly of Parliamentarians was constituted by 16 political representatives—8 from the Union of the Democratic Centre (UCD), 2 each from the Spanish Socialist Workers' Party (PSOE) and People's Alliance (AP) and 1 each from the Communist Party of Spain (PCE), the Galician Workers Party (POG), the Galicianist Party (PG) and the Party of Labour of Spain (PTE)—in order to elaborate a draft statute of autonomy, but the process was delayed by the UCD's opposition to granting the Galician autonomy the level of devolution achieved by the Basque Country and Catalonia. In July 1979, there was a change in the leadership of the pre-autonomic Regional Government as Galician president Antonio Rosón was replaced by José Quiroga Suárez over discrepancies within UCD to Rosón's determined pro-autonomy stance. The resulting text was considered by left-wing and nationalist parties as unambitious when compared to the Basque and Catalan projects concurrently underway, and it was met with growing dissatisfaction from the various political groups over the limited extent of devolution as it was submitted to the Cortes Generales for its ratification, with subsequent negotiations over the proposed text not reaching fruition. Attempts from the UCD to unilaterally impose the draft Statute were met with public outcry from opposition parties, and caused an internal crisis within the Galician UCD over disagreements with the proposed text, despite both the UCD-controlled regional government and Prime Minister Adolfo Suárez coming out in support of the draft.

Massive political demonstrations held throughout the main Galician cities on 4 December 1979 in protest against the proposed draft, dubbed as the "Statute of UCD" or the "outrage Statute" (Galician: Estatuto da aldraxe), and threats from opposition parties of campaigning for the 'No' vote in the eventual referendum required under Article 151 of the Constitution to ratify the Statute, namely the PSOE, the PCE, the POG, and the PG, among others, led the UCD to accept negotiations over a more relaxed interpretation of the Statute in order to prevent a political deadlock over the issue. After the UCD accepted to reform the draft Statute to allow for devolution in equal terms to the Basque Country and Catalonia, negotiations ensued with the PSOE, AP, PCE and PG, leading to an agreement over the Statute's reform ahead of the scheduled referendum, the "Hostel Pact" (Spanish: Pacto del Hostal) of 26 September 1980.

== Date ==
The date of the referendum had been initially scheduled for the end of May or the beginning of June 1980, but the strong opposition to the draft Statute from left-wing and nationalist parties, who had announced a campaign for a 'No' vote in the referendum, resulted in several delays in the date while negotiations were ongoing, firstly to the end of June, then to September or October, or beyond. After an inter-party agreement was reached and ratified on 1 October 1980 over the draft Statute's reform, and the approval of the reformed Statute on 29 October, the referendum for its ratification was scheduled for Sunday, 21 December, with its decree being published in the Official State Gazette on 8 November.

== Campaign ==
Party policies
Position	Parties	Ref.
Yes	Union of the Democratic Centre (UCD)	
Yes	Spanish Socialist Workers' Party (PSOE)	
Yes	People's Alliance (AP)	
Yes	Communist Party of Spain (PCE)	
Yes	Galicianist Party (PG)	
Yes	Galician Socialist Unity–PSOE (USG–PSOE)	
Yes	Carlist Party (PC)	
Yes	Unified Communist Party of Spain (PCEU)	
No	Galician National-Popular Bloc (BNPG)	
No	Galician Socialist Party (PSG)	
No	Communist Movement of Galicia (MCG)	
No	Revolutionary Communist League (LCR)	
No	Workers' Socialist Party (PST)	
No	New Force (FN)	
Abstention	Spanish Phalanx of the CNSO (FE–JONS)	
Abstention	Galician Workers' Party (POG)	
Abstention	Liberated Galiza (GC)	

The Regional Government of Galicia invested 100 million Pta in an institutional campaign to encourage turnout in the referendum, over fears from political parties that high abstention rates, coming as a consequence from disaffection with the chaotic Statute negotiations, could en up blurring the final result. The parties in favour of the 'Yes' vote to the Statute did not reach an agreement for running a joint campaign, instead organizing separate party campaigns to highlight their particular views on the Galician autonomy. Concurrently, the UCD had shown reluctance to coordinating itself with other parties over specific plans on the devolution timetable, the organization of the referendum, the date of the first Galician regional election or the application of a specific economic plan for Galicia.

== Opinion polls ==
The table below lists voting intention estimates in reverse chronological order, showing the most recent first and using the dates when the survey fieldwork was done, as opposed to the date of publication. Where the fieldwork dates are unknown, the date of publication is given instead. The highest percentage figure in each polling survey is displayed with its background shaded in the leading choice's colour. The "Lead" columns on the right show the percentage-point difference between the "Yes" and "No" choices in a given poll.

Polling firm/Commissioner	Fieldwork date	Sample size	Total						Considering only Yes/No totals		
Polling firm/Commissioner	Fieldwork date	Sample size	Yes	No	Invalid/ Blank	X mark	Question	Lead	Yes	No	Lead
1980 referendum	21 Dec 1980	—N/a	20.7	5.6	1.9	71.7	–	15.1	78.8	21.2	57.6
UCD	13 Dec 1980	?	19.0	6.0	–	75.0	–	13.0	75.0	25.0	50.0
DATA/CIS	23 Sep–1 Oct 1980	1,686	31.6	14.5	–	19.5	34.4	17.1	68.6	31.4	37.2
ICSA–Gallup	1–15 Sep 1980	1,000	24.0	15.0	–	61.0	–	9.0	62.0	38.0	24.0
UCD	9 Jan 1980	?	15.0	40.0	–	45.0	–	25.0	27.0	73.0	46.0

== Results ==
=== Overall ===
Question

Do you approve of the Statute of Autonomy of Galicia Bill?

Choice	Votes	%
For	450,556	78.77
Against	121,448	21.23
Total	572,004	100.00
Valid votes	572,004	93.13
Invalid/blank votes	42,214	6.87
Total votes	614,218	100.00
Registered voters/turnout	2,172,898	28.27
Source: Congress of Deputies

=== Results by province ===
Province	Electorate	Turnout	Yes		No	
Province	Electorate	Turnout	Votes	%	Votes	%
La Coruña	844.268	32.08	196,736	77.81	56,102	22.19
Lugo	334,412	19.65	46,981	77.57	13,588	22.43
Orense	355,397	21.17	58,265	82.86	12,056	17.14
Pontevedra	638,821	31.69	148,574	78.91	39,702	21.09
Total	2,172,898	28.27	450,556	78.77	121,448	21.23

== Aftermath ==
The most commented feat of the referendum result were the extremely high abstention rates in all four Galician provinces. The city of La Coruña recorded one of the highest turnouts, barely above 40%, but also the highest proportion of negative votes with more than 34%. In the province of Pontevedra, turnout was lower in those local councils under UCD control. It was reported that in several election wards in the city of Orense neither the full members nor the substitutes had shown up, with the provincial electoral commission commenting on the unusual nature of this circumstance. The province of Lugo registered the lowest turnout, with more than 80% of registered voters abstaining. While some political leaders attributed the high abstention rates to an inflation in census data of up to 20 or 30%, a result of double records and outdated register figures in a very rural and backward region such as was Galicia at the time, the National Statistics Institute replied that these mismatches would amount to no more than 10% of the census. The final results of the vote were published in the Official State Gazette on 10 January 1981.

The high abstention prompted the only AP member in the Regional Government to resign. The regional PSOE rejected UCD's pleas for re-joining the government—which it had left in November 1979 over disagreements on the Statute issue—and instead requested for the regional government's renovation, amid calls that UCD had proven unable to generate the required confidence in the Galician people with the autonomy process, a move which UCD rejected likewise. After several delays, the Statute was taken to the Cortes Generales for its final ratification, being approved by the Congress on 17 February 1981, and by the Senate on 17 March. The Statute was promulgated on 6 April 1981 and published in the Official State Gazette on 28 April, coming into force on 18 May. The first regional election would, under the Statute's provisions, be scheduled for 20 October 1981.

== See also ==
- 1979 Basque Statute of Autonomy referendum
- 1979 Catalan Statute of Autonomy referendum
- 1980 Andalusian autonomy initiative referendum
- 1981 Andalusian Statute of Autonomy referendum
