= 1982 Andalusian regional election =

Election in the Spanish region of Andalusia

- 23 May 1982

All 109 seats in the Parliament of Andalusia 55 seats needed for a majority
- Opinion polls
- Registered: 4,342,408
- Turnout: 2,874,121 (66.2%)
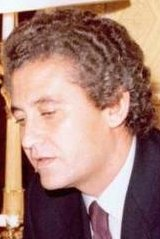

	First party	Second party	Third party
Leader	Rafael Escuredo	Antonio Hernández Mancha (Note: AP did not field a single candidate for the post of regional president. Antonio Hernández Mancha was the party's regional chair and its most visible leader at the time of the election.)	Luis Merino
Party	PSOE–A	AP	UCD
Leader since	2 June 1979	10 February 1980	30 January 1982
Leader's seat	Seville	Córdoba	Málaga
Seats won	66	17	15
Popular vote	1,498,619	484,474	371,154
Percentage	52.6%	17.0%	13.0%
	Fourth party	Fifth party
Leader	Felipe Alcaraz	Luis Uruñuela
Party	PCA–PCE	PSA–PA
Leader since	18 January 1981	October 1981
Leader's seat	Seville	Seville
Seats won	8	3
Popular vote	243,344	153,709
Percentage	8.5%	5.4%
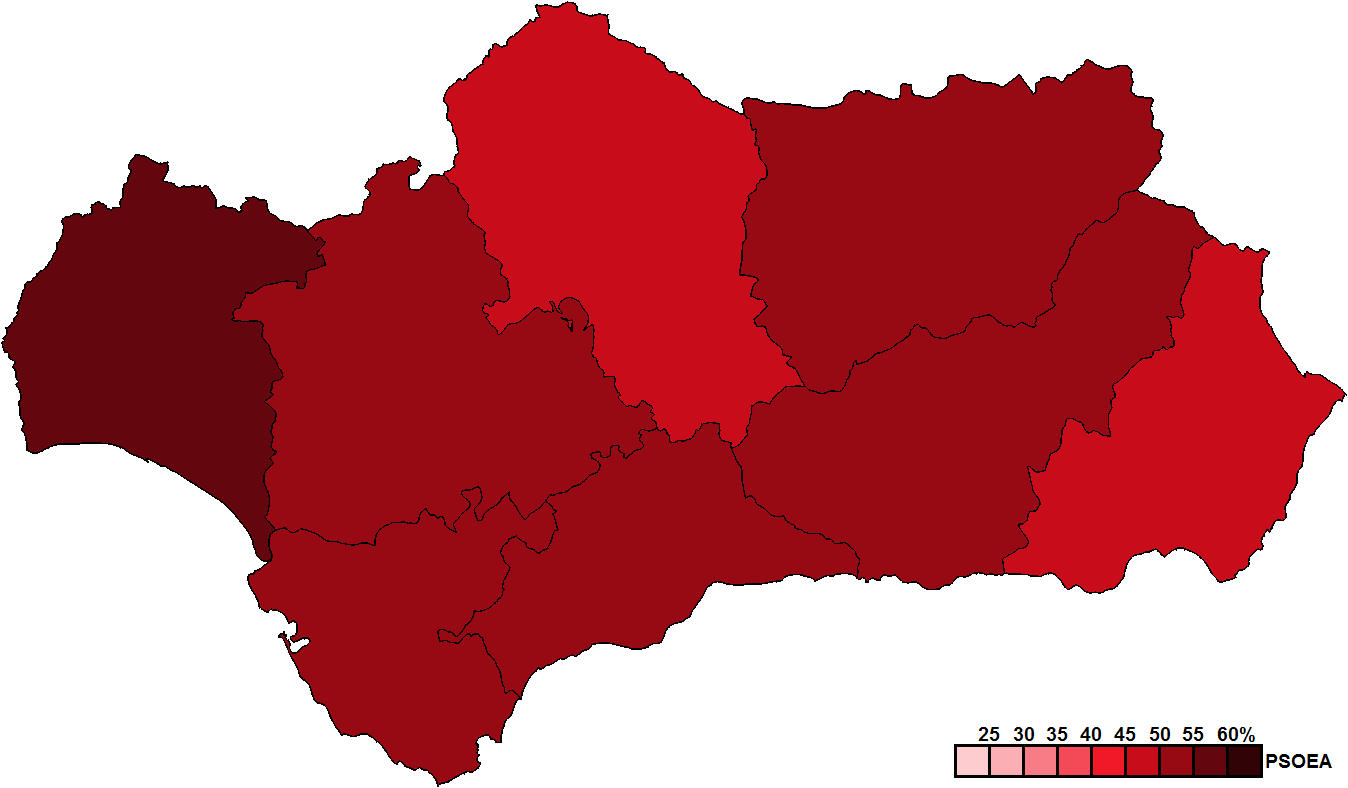
- Constituency results map for the Parliament of Andalusia
President before election
Rafael Escuredo
PSOE–A
President after election
Rafael Escuredo
PSOE–A

A regional election was held in Andalusia on 23 May 1982 to elect the 1st Parliament of the autonomous community. All 109 seats in the Parliament were up for election.

The Spanish Socialist Workers' Party of Andalusia (PSOE–A) under incumbent regional president Rafael Escuredo won a landslide victory with 66 seats and 52.6% of the share, the best result obtained by any party in an Andalusian regional election to date. The Union of the Democratic Centre (UCD), then in the Government of Spain, suffered from the effects of an ongoing economic crisis, internal party infighting and a massive unpopularity in the region over the party's handling of the 1980 autonomy initiative referendum and obtained just 15 seats and 13.0% of the vote, performing third behind the People's Alliance (AP) with 17.0% of the share and 17 seats. Both the Communist Party of Andalusia (PCA–PCE) and the Socialist Party of Andalusia–Andalusian Party (PSA–PA) performed poorly with 8 (8.5% of the vote) and 3 seats (5.4%), respectively.

After the election, Escuredo was re-elected as Andalusian president. This would be the last regional election to be contested by the UCD before its electoral meltdown in the 1982 Spanish general election and its subsequent dissolution in February 1983, as well as the only time—together with 2004—that a party would secure an absolute majority of the vote. The PSOE would go on to form the regional government uninterruptedly until 2018.

== Background ==
The Andalusian autonomic process started in 1977 with the constitution of an Assembly of Parliamentarians and the establishment of a pre-autonomic regional government in April 1978. On 4 December 1978, all political parties signed the "Pact of Antequera" (Spanish: Pacto de Antequera), a commitment to achieving the greatest possible level of devolution for Andalusia in the shortest possible timeframe within the scope of the newly-approved Spanish Constitution, and shortly thereafter, Rafael Escuredo from the Spanish Socialist Workers' Party (PSOE) was elected as the new pre-autonomic regional president, initiating procedures for the region to apply to autonomy through the "fast-track route" set down in Article 151.

Opposition from the governing Union of the Democratic Centre (UCD) to the application of Article 151 for Andalusia led to an intensely fought campaign in the 1980 autonomy initiative referendum, which ultimately resulted in a major setback for the UCD. An inter-party agreement in October 1980 resulted in legal amendments allowing Andalusia to access autonomy through the "fast-track route", and in the drafting of a statute of autonomy which was ratified in a referendum on 20 October 1981, then by the Cortes Generales in December. Attempts to avoid similar political clashes in the future over the devolution issue had led to the so-called "rationalization" of the autonomic process, through the signing of the first autonomic pacts between UCD and PSOE on 31 July 1981, agreeing for a joint calendar of devolution for the remaining regions. This would be embodied through the approval, in 1982, of the Organic Law of Harmonization of the Autonomic Process (LOAPA).

Concurrently with the 1981 referendum, a regional election was held in Galicia which saw the success of the People's Alliance (AP) and the political thesis of its leader, Manuel Fraga, on the right's "natural majority": the prospects of an UCD–AP alliance which would eventually see the right-of-centre electorate converging around a single political pole. Ever since the resignation of Prime Minister Adolfo Suárez and his replacement by Leopoldo Calvo-Sotelo, UCD had been slowly drifting rightwards amid an intensification of the political tensions between the various political families within the party—social-democrats, christian-democrats, moderates, liberals and conservatives—bringing the UCD ever close to the brink of internal rupture and leaving the political centre up for grabs by the PSOE. Shortly after the UCD's defeat in the Galician election, Calvo-Sotelo forced Agustín Rodríguez Sahagún's resignation as UCD leader to take himself the reins of the party, just as the UCD parliamentary groups in the Cortes Generales started to split up as a result of a number of defections.

The election was held on the backdrop of the 23-F trial, the attempted military coup d'etat staged on 23 February 1981 by a group of Civil Guard officers led by Antonio Tejero during Leopoldo Calvo-Sotelo's investiture as Prime Minister after Suárez's resignation and whose failure incidentally led to the decisive consolidation of democratic rule in Spain. The four main political parties in Spain—UCD, PSOE, PCE and AP—had agreed for a joint strategy on the issue so as to avoid any interference both in the trial's procedure and from its effects on Spanish political life.

== Overview ==
Under the 1981 Statute of Autonomy, the Parliament of Andalusia was the unicameral legislature of the homonymous autonomous community, having legislative power in devolved matters, as well as the ability to grant or withdraw confidence from a regional president. The electoral and procedural rules were supplemented by national law provisions (which were those used in the 1977 general election).

=== Date ===
The Provisional Regional Government of Andalusia, in agreement with the Government of Spain, was required to call an election to the Parliament of Andalusia within three months from the enactment of the Statute, with election day taking place within 60 days from the call. The Statute was published in the Official State Gazette on 11 January 1982, setting the latest possible date for election day on 10 June 1982.

The Parliament of Andalusia could not be dissolved before the expiration date of parliament.

After the Statute's approval, negotiations ensued between the central and regional governments to determine the date of the election, resulting in the election being scheduled for late May 1982, with either 23 or 30 May as the most likely dates over a wish from political parties to prevent a high abstention rate. The vote was finally determined for 23 May. The election to the Parliament of Andalusia was officially called on 26 March 1982 with the publication of the corresponding decree in the Official Gazette of the Regional Government of Andalusia, setting election day for 23 May.

=== Electoral system ===
Voting for the Parliament was based on universal suffrage, comprising all Spanish nationals over 18 years of age, registered in Andalusia and with full political rights.

The Parliament of Andalusia had 109 seats in its first election. All were elected in eight multi-member constituencies—corresponding to the provinces of Almería, Cádiz, Córdoba, Granada, Huelva, Jaén, Málaga and Seville, each of which was assigned a fixed number of seats—using the D'Hondt method and closed-list proportional voting, with a three percent-threshold of valid votes (including blank ballots) in each constituency. The use of this electoral method resulted in a higher effective threshold depending on district magnitude and vote distribution.

As a result of the aforementioned allocation, each Parliament constituency was entitled the following seats:

Seats	Constituencies
18	Seville
15	Cádiz, Málaga
13	Córdoba, Granada, Jaén
11	Almería, Huelva

The law did not provide for by-elections to fill vacant seats; instead, any vacancies arising after the proclamation of candidates and during the legislative term were filled by the next candidates on the party lists or, when required, by designated substitutes.

== Parties and candidates ==
The electoral law allowed for parties and federations registered in the interior ministry, alliances and groupings of electors to present lists of candidates. Parties and federations intending to form an alliance were required to inform the relevant electoral commission within 15 days of the election call, whereas groupings of electors needed to secure the signature of at least one permille—and, in any case, 500 signatures—of the electorate in the constituencies for which they sought election, disallowing electors from signing for more than one list.

Below is a list of the main parties and alliances which contested the election:

Candidacy	Parties and alliances	Leading candidate	Ideology	Gov.	Ref.
PSOE–A	List: Spanish Socialist Workers' Party of Andalusia (PSOE–A)	Rafael Escuredo	Social democracy	Yes	
UCD	List: Union of the Democratic Centre (UCD)	Luis Merino	Centrism	Yes	
PCA–PCE	List: Communist Party of Andalusia (PCA–PCE)	Felipe Alcaraz	Eurocommunism	Yes	
PSA–PA	List: Socialist Party of Andalusia–Andalusian Party (PSA–PA)	Luis Uruñuela	Andalusian nationalism Socialism; Marxism	Yes	
AP	List: People's Alliance (AP)	Antonio Hernández Mancha	Conservatism; National conservatism	No	

The PSOE kept incumbent president Rafael Escuredo as its leading candidate, after an agreement with PSOE–A secretary general and Escuredo's long-time rival José Rodríguez de la Borbolla. The UCD sought to present a renovated image after its fiasco in the 1980 referendum, its defeat in the Galician election and the party crisis in November 1981. Soledad Becerril, newly appointed culture minister in the Spanish government, was elected as the regional UCD's new leader, whereas former mayor of Málaga Luis Merino was chosen to lead the party into the election. The conservative AP, reinvigorated after its recent victory in the 1981 Galician election, did not field a candidate for the regional presidency as the regional party leader, Antonio Hernández Mancha, was a still relatively unknown political figure in Andalusia.

The Socialist Party of Andalusia–Andalusian Party (PSA–PA) had appointed incumbent mayor of Seville Luis Uruñuela as its leading candidate during the 1981 referendum campaign, with the party having joined forces with the Unified Andalusian Party–Party of Labour of Andalusia (PAU–PTA), aiming at securing the popular support from Andalusian nationalism and dispute President Escuredo's appeal within this electoral segment. Simultaneously, two UCD's splinter groups were the subject of speculation on whether they would contest the election and challenge their former party:

- Andalusian Unity (UA), the party of former UCD regional leader and several-times minister Manuel Clavero formed in the wake of the 1980 referendum, had turned down offers from AP to form an electoral alliance, but finally chose to withdraw from the electoral race over a lack of funding for the campaign.
- The Democratic Action Party (PAD), founded in November 1981 by former justice minister Francisco Fernández Ordóñez, had chosen not to field candidates for the regional election after having initially considered it. However, in early May, the PAD would announce an alliance with the PSOE for the next general election.

A total of 1,188 candidates from 17 political parties stood for election, with six candidacies running in all eight provinces: the main parties PSOE, UCD, PCE, PSA–PA and AP, as well as New Force (FN). No electoral alliances were formed ahead of the election.

== Campaign ==
=== Positions ===
Opinion polls heading into the campaign predicted a wide lead from the Spanish Socialist Workers' Party of Andalusia (PSOE–A) over all other parties, with UCD, PCE, PSA and AP fighting for securing second place regionally. The election was perceived as a major electoral test on Prime Minister Leopoldo Calvo-Sotelo's party and government ahead of the next general election. Among the main issues affecting Andalusia at the time of the election were the traditionally high unemployment in the region and the agrarian issue, with most farmlands being the property of a small number of landowners.

Party slogans
Candidacies	Original slogan	English translation	Ref.
PSOE–A	« A la hora de la verdad »	"Towards the moment of truth"	
UCD	« Anda Andalucía, anda » « El partido más ancho »	"Go Andalusia, go" "The broadest party"	
PCA–PCE	« Juntos podemos »	"Together we can"	
PSA–PA	« El partido andaluz al Parlamento andaluz »	"The Andalusian party to the Andalusian parliament"	
AP	« El trabajo es lo que cuenta »	"Work is what counts"	

The PSOE–A aimed at obtaining an absolute majority in the Parliament of Andalusia in order for avoiding post-election alliances that could prove troublesome for the party: an alliance with the PCE was seen as potentially damaging for the PSOE's new strategy of moderation, while allying with UCD seen as problematic due to its increasing unpopularity; alliances with AP and PSA were discarded outright out of ideological reasons. Controversy arose after a PSOE–PCE coalition was formed in Asturias in April 1982, being received both with dissatisfaction from the regional PSOE and criticism from other parties that such an arrangement would be mirrored by the Socialists in the Andalusian regional government. PSOE leader Felipe González argued against any such alliance in Andalusia on the grounds that "the creation of antagonistic [ideological] blocs is not good", and the party's official stance throughout the campaign was that it would govern alone, either if it secured a majority in parliament or if it became the largest minority.

The UCD faced a difficult task, seeking both to recover its former popularity in the region as well as to confront the growing challenge posed by the conservative AP within its traditional electorate. While the party did not expect to win the election, it hoped to secure at least 20% of the votes. To further this, the UCD-led Spanish government had launched an unprecedented package of economic and investment plans in the region, as well as sending government ministers to host public events and infrastructure openings. Party leaders had sought to invite former prime minister Adolfo Suárez to campaign rallies, but these approachments were rejected amid the increasing political distance between Suárez and the UCD leadership. The UCD campaign was the most expensive—worth Pta 600 million—and included the establishment of a large image cabinet made of journalists, image technicians and consultants, as well as the use of three programmed robots to help spread the party's campaign manifesto.

AP posed a significant threat to the UCD after its success in the Galician election as it concurrently secured financial support from the Spanish Confederation of Business Organizations (CEOE), but was hampered by a lack of territorial implantation in Andalusia and a historically negative perception of right-of-centre parties in the region. The party campaigned for AP being the tactical vote among centre-right voters, affirming to constitute "the only possible brake on a Socialist triumph in Spain", amid concerns that the UCD–AP competition could end up benefitting the PSOE as the largest party. As in Galicia, the party's campaign was dominated by the presence of party national leader Manuel Fraga, who kept warning of a possible post-election PSOE–UCD agreement as a reason for voters to choose AP over the UCD and foster his hypothesized "natural majority".

Of the smaller parties, the Communist Party of Spain (PCE)'s organization in Andalusia was seen as amongst the most solid throughout Spain, but the party had been beset by internal struggles, expulsions and personal attacks among party members during the previous years, as well as strong electoral competition from both PSOE and the Socialist Party of Andalusia (PSA). The PCE hoped to maintain results from previous elections and secure a "kingmaker" position that forced the PSOE into the negotiating table, so as to allow the formation of a left-wing government in which the PCE's support came to prove essential, while asserting that the PSOE leadership's stance on not seeking an alliance with the PCE constituted evidence of the Socialists' moving to the right. Concurrently, PSA leaders adopted a stark Andalusian nationalist discourse and discarded joining any government not led by themselves, arguing that "under no circumstances shall [the PSA] participate in a coalition government with a centralist party" in reference to both UCD and PSOE, which became the focus of their main row of attacks.

=== Events ===
The pre-campaign and campaign periods would unveil an intense political activity. In March, the PSOE-led regional government launched a campaign of support to King Juan Carlos I in response to the 23-F trial, which was received with criticism from pro-business associations over alleged "electoralism". In late April, the PSA had unsuccessfully attempted to challenge the PSOE's candidacies in all eight provinces over their use of the "Spanish Socialist Workers' Party of Andalusia" label, arguing that such a name was not registered in the interior ministry. The Spanish government was concurrently criticized over the perceived partisan use of the RTVE media, which was seen as leaning heavily in favour of the UCD. Electoral debates were proposed but none was held: on the one hand, a debate between President Escuredo and UCD candidate Luis Merino was rejected by the PSOE; on the other hand, a political debate over Andalusia between Calvo-Sotelo and Felipe González was ruled out by UCD. Bitter struggling and verbal aggressiveness between the two parties throughout the campaign—including accusations of aspersion-casting or of fostering physical attacks on the other—would remain frequent.

The main political confrontation would come over the alleged legitimacy of pro-business associations—especially from the CEOE—of actively supporting UCD and AP's campaigns while concurrently attacking any prospects of a PSOE-led government, under the umbrella of an institutional campaign to prompt voter turnout. This move would see much criticism from several organizations—including both PSOE and PCE—over the alleged lack of neutrality of such campaign. Amid growing crossed accusations, on 13 May both the Central Electoral Commission (JEC) and the Provincial Electoral Commission of Seville forbid the CEOE from participating in the electoral campaign, on the grounds that such a partisan campaigning was constitutionally limited to organizations contesting the election. The ruling would be dubbed by both AP and the CEOE as "undemocratic" by transgressing their "freedom of speech", and several days later the Territorial Court of Seville ruled to suspend the effectiveness of the Provincial Commission's ruling—but not the JEC's one—leading the CEOE to announce the continuation of its campaign. A second, similarly-themed campaign was launched on the issue of education by the Spanish Confederation of Education and Training Centres, which accused left-wing parties' proposals of favouring public education of seeking to "eradicate the Christian religion from Andalusian schools".

The campaign ended with speculation on prime minister Calvo-Sotelo's future, amid expectations that an UCD electoral collapse in the regional election could lead to his resignation as either prime minister, party national president, or both, though this was ruled out by UCD members throughout the last days of campaigning.

== Opinion polls ==
The tables below lists opinion polling results in reverse chronological order, showing the most recent first and using the dates when the survey fieldwork was done, as opposed to the date of publication. Where the fieldwork dates are unknown, the date of publication is given instead. The highest percentage figure in each polling survey is displayed with its background shaded in the leading party's colour. If a tie ensues, this is applied to the figures with the highest percentages. The "Lead" column on the right shows the percentage-point difference between the parties with the highest percentages in a poll.

=== Voting intention estimates ===
The table below lists weighted voting intention estimates. Refusals are generally excluded from the party vote percentages, while question wording and the treatment of "don't know" responses and those not intending to vote may vary between polling organisations. When available, seat projections determined by the polling organisations are displayed below (or in place of) the percentages in a smaller font; 55 seats were required for an absolute majority in the Parliament of Andalusia.

Polling firm/Commissioner	Fieldwork date	Sample size	Turnout	PSOE	UCD	PCA–PCE	PSA–PA	AP	UA	Lead
1982 regional election	23 May 1982	—N/a	66.2	52.6; 66	13.0; 15	8.5; 8	5.4; 3	17.0; 17	–	35.6
UCD	17 May 1982	?	?	55.0; 65	15.0; 18	7.0; 5	10.0; 10/11	10.0; 10/11	–	40.0
Emopública/CIS	14 May 1982	4,000	?	56.4	15.9	6.0	10.0	10.4	–	40.5
Mediterráneo	12 May 1982	?	?	46.0; 51/56	20.1; 21/25	7.0 ?	15.0 ?	10.0 ?	–	25.9
ICSA–Gallup (Note: "Mensaje para andaluces". ABC (in Spanish). 19 May 1982.)	7–12 May 1982	2,000	62	44.8; 53	19.3; 26	9.9; 8	12.1; 12	10.3; 10	–	25.5
Sofemasa/El País	8–11 May 1982	3,500	70.9	49.1	17.2	6.1	11.5	12.0	–	31.9
Emopública/CIS	6–8 May 1982	4,000	?	55.1	15.5	6.8	12.0	10.3	–	39.6
UCD	26 Apr 1982	?	?	57.0	18.0	3.0	14.0	8.0	–	39.0
ECO/CIS	20–24 Apr 1982	4,012	?	52.3	15.2	6.0	14.8	10.2	–	37.1
CPEA/AP	23 Apr 1982	?	?	? 36	? 18	? 4	? 7	? 44	–	?
CIS	1 Mar 1982	3,947	?	53.7	18.0	7.3	9.7	8.3	0.4	35.7
CEOE	13 Feb 1982	?	?	51.0	10.6	–	12.0	10.3	–	39.0
CIS	1 Feb 1982	2,000	?	54.0	16.3	6.6	10.3	9.6	0.7	37.7
UCD	27 Jan 1982	?	?	51.0	7.8	6.0	10.0	7.7	–	41.0
CIS	1 Jan 1982	2,000	?	57.0	13.0	6.9	10.0	9.6	0.8	44.0
Metra Seis/CIS	23 Nov–9 Dec 1981	2,000	?	59.9	8.8	5.2	14.1	9.3	1.7	45.8
1979 general election	1 Mar 1979	—N/a	68.7	33.5 (43)	31.8 (39)	13.3 (15)	11.1 (11)	4.3 (Note: Results for CD in the 1979 election.) (1)	–	1.7

=== Voting preferences ===
The table below lists raw, unweighted voting preferences.

Polling firm/Commissioner	Fieldwork date	Sample size	PSOE	UCD	PCA–PCE	PSA–PA	AP	UA	Question	X mark	Lead
1982 regional election	23 May 1982	—N/a	34.5	8.6	5.6	3.5	11.2	–	—N/a	33.7	23.3
Emopública/CIS	14 May 1982	4,000	30.9	8.7	3.3	5.5	5.7	–	37.3	7.9	22.2
Sofemasa/El País	8–11 May 1982	3,500	31.9	7.5	4.5	6.4	8.3	–	39.2		23.6
Emopública/CIS	6–8 May 1982	4,000	32.0	9.0	4.0	7.0	6.0	–	33.0	9.0	23.0
ECO/CIS	20–24 Apr 1982	4,012	31.9	9.3	3.7	9.0	6.0	–	32.2	6.8	22.6
AP	12 Mar 1982	?	30.6	12.1	10.1	8.9	18.8	2.2	–	–	11.8
CIS	1 Mar 1982	3,947	27.9	9.3	3.8	5.0	4.3	0.2	39.6	8.5	18.6
CIS	1 Feb 1982	2,000	25.5	7.7	3.1	4.9	4.6	0.3	45.9	6.9	17.8
AP	22 Jan 1982	?	37.0	11.0	6.0	–	24.0	–	–	–	13.0
CIS	1 Jan 1982	2,000	26.2	6.0	3.2	4.6	4.4	0.3	47.2	6.9	20.2
Metra Seis/CIS	23 Nov–9 Dec 1981	2,000	39.0	5.7	3.4	9.1	6.0	1.1	29.2	6.0	29.9
ECO/CIS	9–12 Oct 1981	6,462	29.6	6.9	4.4	5.5	1.3	0.9	47.3	2.6	22.7
1979 general election	1 Mar 1979	—N/a	22.8	21.6	9.0	7.5	2.9	–	—N/a	31.3	1.2

=== Victory likelihood ===
The table below lists opinion polling on the perceived likelihood of victory for each party in the event of a regional election taking place.

Polling firm/Commissioner	Fieldwork date	Sample size	PSOE	UCD	PCA–PCE	PSA–PA	AP	Other/ None	Question	Lead
Emopública/CIS	6–8 May 1982	4,000	44.8	9.5	0.5	3.8	1.8	0.3	39.3	35.3
ECO/CIS	20–24 Apr 1982	4,012	39.5	9.3	0.8	4.6	2.6	0.3	42.8	30.2

== Results ==
=== Overall ===
Summary of the 23 May 1982 Parliament of Andalusia election results →
Parties and alliances	Popular vote			Seats	
Parties and alliances	Votes	%	±pp	Total	+/−
Spanish Socialist Workers' Party of Andalusia (PSOE–A)	1,498,619	52.60	n/a	66	n/a
People's Alliance (AP)	484,474	17.00	n/a	17	n/a
Union of the Democratic Centre (UCD)	371,154	13.03	n/a	15	n/a
Communist Party of Andalusia (PCA–PCE)	243,344	8.54	n/a	8	n/a
Socialist Party of Andalusia–Andalusian Party (PSA–PA)	153,709	5.39	n/a	3	n/a
New Force (FN)	34,948	1.23	n/a	0	n/a
Workers' Socialist Party (PST)	14,600	0.51	n/a	0	n/a
Communist Unification of Spain (UCE)	8,121	0.29	n/a	0	n/a
Spanish Communist Workers' Party (PCOE)	7,891	0.28	n/a	0	n/a
Communist Movement of Andalusia (MCA)	6,681	0.23	n/a	0	n/a
Communist Party of Spain (Marxist–Leninist) (PCE (m–l))	6,015	0.21	n/a	0	n/a
Communist Party of Spain (Marxist–Leninist) (PCE (m–l))	3,587	0.13	n/a	0	n/a
Granadan Candidacy of Workers (CGT)	2,428	0.09	n/a	0	n/a
Spanish Phalanx of the CNSO (FE–JONS)	3,589	0.13	n/a	0	n/a
Falangist Movement of Spain (MFE)	3,163	0.11	n/a	0	n/a
Independent Syndicalists (SI)	1,275	0.04	n/a	0	n/a
Socialist Party (PS)	949	0.03	n/a	0	n/a
Revolutionary Communist League (LCR)	895	0.03	n/a	0	n/a
Andalusian People's Solidarity (SPA)	490	0.02	n/a	0	n/a
Communist Organization of Spain (Red Flag) (OCE–BR)	10	0.00	n/a	0	n/a
Blank ballots	9,327	0.33	n/a		
Total	2,849,254			109	n/a
Valid votes	2,849,254	99.13	n/a		
Invalid votes	24,867	0.87	n/a		
Votes cast / turnout	2,874,121	66.19	n/a		
Abstentions	1,468,287	33.81	n/a		
Registered voters	4,342,408				

Popular vote
PSOE–A	52.60%
AP	17.00%
UCD	13.03%
PCA–PCE	8.54%
PSA–PA	5.39%
FN	1.23%
Others	1.88%
Blank ballots	0.33%

Seats
PSOE–A	60.55%
AP	15.60%
UCD	13.76%
PCA–PCE	7.34%
PSA–PA	2.75%

=== Distribution by constituency ===
Constituency	PSOE–A		AP		UCD		PCA–PCE		PSA–PA	
Constituency	%	S	%	S	%	S	%	S	%	S
Almería	48.8	6	17.3	2	22.0	3	4.1	−	3.8	−
Cádiz	54.5	9	15.2	2	11.4	2	6.0	1	9.2	1
Córdoba	49.0	7	17.3	2	13.0	2	12.4	2	4.9	−
Granada	52.4	8	17.1	2	14.8	2	8.9	1	2.8	−
Huelva	55.7	8	12.6	1	18.7	2	5.3	−	4.2	−
Jaén	52.0	8	16.4	2	16.2	2	9.0	1	3.5	−
Málaga	53.8	9	18.0	3	10.7	1	7.3	1	6.9	1
Seville	53.3	11	18.6	3	9.3	1	10.1	2	5.6	1
Total	52.6	66	17.0	17	13.0	15	8.5	8	5.4	3

== Aftermath ==
=== Analysis ===
The election resulted in a landslide majority for the PSOE, which at the time was at the helm of the Regional Government of Andalusia, securing 52.6% of the vote, 66 seats and outright majorities in all provinces but Almería and Córdoba. The PSOE became the first party obtaining an absolute majority in an election of any kind in Spain since the start of the country's transition to democracy. The UCD vote plummeted in the region compared to the 1979 general election, going from 31.8% to 13.0% of the share and 15 seats while being surpassed by AP, which became the second political party in Andalusia by securing 17.0% (up from 4.3%) and 17 seats. Results for the PCE and PSA were disappointing, as the former went from 13.3% to 8.5% in a region which had been seen as amongst the most favourable to them, whereas the PSA, which had obtained a spectacular result in the 1979 election with 11.1%, plummeted to score 5.4% of the vote and 3 seats; party secretary general Alejandro Rojas-Marcos—who was running as number two in party's list for the Seville constituency—not being able to get elected.

While some analyses attributed the election results to the outcome of the 1980 autonomy initiative referendum—which had inflicted a severe political blow to the UCD's government in Spain—these only provided a partial justification of the major vote realignments that had taken place in Andalusia since 1979. The PSOE capitalized on tactical voting from a number of sources: on the one hand, the PCE was mauled as a result of internal infighting, splits and growing dissatisfaction with Santiago Carrillo's leadership style, hastening vote transfers to the Socialists amid a growing polarization of the vote; on the other hand, scaremongering tactics from the CEOE's aggressive campaign, supported by both UCD and AP, were said to have had the opposite effect of bringing a large number of former UCD voters into the PSOE's fold, as the latter was on its way to occupy the ideological's middle ground of Spanish politics after the UCD's growing attempts to lurch away from the centre to appeal to its conservative base.

Commenting on the results, the prime minister and UCD leader Leopoldo Calvo-Sotelo claimed that these did not correspond to the "great effort" made by his party in the region, nor with "the political importance that the centre option continues to have in Spain". Party members acknowledged that results were "very negative" and that they had lost a great deal of their votes to the ascending AP, whose result was also attributed by government ministers to the CEOE's campaign in favour of Fraga's party. The election outcome would leave the UCD's leadership bewildered, prompting calls for Calvo-Sotelo to resign as party leader and for a snap general election to be called, whereas some party members acknowledged that Fraga's "natural majority" thesis was disfiguring UCD's position by pulling the party into the right.

The PSA's negative results were attributed to the party having lost the narrative on the autonomy issue to the PSOE, which was seen as having staunchly defended the application of Article 151 and as having succeeded in its pledge to bring full devolution to the region, coupled with a strong disapproval of PSA leader Alejandro Rojas-Marcos's policy of rapprochement to the UCD in September 1980, when he had attempted to marginalize the Andalusian government by unilaterally agreeing on a solution to the autonomy issue with the Spanish government. Rojas-Marcos would subsequently resign as party leader.

=== Government formation ===
On 15 July 1982, the Parliament of Andalusia elected Rafael Escuredo as regional president on the first ballot with an absolute majority of votes, with his government being sworn in on 21 July.

Investiture; Nomination of Rafael Escuredo (PSOE–A)
Ballot →	15 July 1982
Required majority →	55 out of 109
Yes: • PSOE–A (66)	66 / 109
No (Note: Parliamentary records do not specify the party membership of the 4 opposition MPs that were absent from the voting.): • AP (17); • UCD (15); • PCA (8); • PSA (3)	39 / 109
Abstentions	0 / 109
Absentees: • AP, UCD, PCA, PSA (4)	4 / 109

== Bibliography ==
- Real Decreto-ley 20/1977, de 18 de marzo, sobre Normas Electorales (Royal Decree-Law 20/1977). Official State Gazette (in Spanish). 18 March 1977. BOE-A-1977-7445.
- Ley Orgánica 6/1981, de 30 de diciembre, de Estatuto de Autonomía para Andalucía (Organic Law 6/1981). Official State Gazette (in Spanish). 30 December 1981. BOE-A-1982-633.
- Decreto 18/1982, de ocho de Marzo, por el que se convocan Elecciones al Parlamento de Andalucía (PDF) (Decree 18/1982). Official Gazette of the Regional Government of Andalusia (in Spanish). 8 March 1982.
