= 1981 Andalusian Statute of Autonomy referendum =

Referendum in the Spanish region of Andalusia

- 20 October 1981
- "Do you approve of the Statute of Autonomy of Andalusia Bill?"

Results
| Choice | Votes | % |
|---|---|---|
| Yes | 2,172,577 | 92.74% |
| No | 170,190 | 7.26% |
| Valid votes | 2,342,767 | 96.39% |
| Invalid or blank votes | 87,836 | 3.61% |
| Total votes | 2,430,603 | 100.00% |
| Registered voters/turnout | 4,543,836 | 53.49% |

A referendum on the approval of the Andalusian Statute of Autonomy was held in Andalusia on Tuesday, 20 October 1981. Voters were asked whether they ratified a proposed Statute of Autonomy of Andalusia bill organizing the provinces of Almería, Cádiz, Córdoba, Granada, Huelva, Jaén, Málaga and Seville into an autonomous community of Spain. The final draft of the bill had been approved by the Andalusian Assembly of Parliamentarians on 1 March 1981, but it required ratification through a binding referendum and its subsequent approval by the Spanish Cortes Generales, as established under Article 151 of the Spanish Constitution of 1978. The referendum was held simultaneously with a regional election in Galicia.

The referendum resulted in 92.7% of valid votes in support of the bill on a turnout of 53.5%. Once approved, the bill was submitted to the consideration of the Cortes Generales, which accepted it on 17 December 1981 (in the Congress of Deputies) and 23 December (in the Spanish Senate), receiving royal assent on 30 December and published in the Official State Gazette on 11 January 1982.

== Legal framework ==
Draft statutes of autonomy approved under the procedure outlined in Article 151 of the Spanish Constitution of 1978 required for its subsequent ratification in referendum, once ruled favourably by the Constitutional Commission of the Congress of Deputies. Under Article 9 of the Organic Law 2/1980, of 18 January, on the regulation of the different forms of referendums, the ratification required the affirmative vote of at least a majority of those validly issued. In the absence of such a majority in one or several provinces, those voting favourably could constitute themselves into an autonomous community of their own, provided that:

1. The provinces were bordering.
2. That it was decided to continue the statutory process by virtue of an agreement adopted by the absolute majority of the Assembly of Parliamentarians corresponding to the provinces that had voted affirmatively on the draft. In this case, the draft Statute was to be transacted as an Organic Law by the Cortes Generales for the sole purpose of its adaptation to the new territorial scope.
3. If the referendum result had been negative in most or all of the provinces, no new Statute would be drafted for a time lapse of five years, notwithstanding those provinces that, having voted affirmatively, chose to constitute themselves into an autonomous community of their own.

The electoral procedure came regulated under Royal Decree-Law 20/1977, of 18 March, and its related legal provisions. Voting in the referendum was on the basis of universal suffrage, which comprised all nationals over eighteen, registered in the provinces of Almería, Cádiz, Córdoba, Granada, Huelva, Jaén, Málaga and Seville and in full enjoyment of their civil and political rights. The question asked was "Do you approve of the Statute of Autonomy of Andalusia Bill?" (Spanish: ¿Aprueba el proyecto de Estatuto de Autonomía para Andalucía?).

== Background and date ==
The 1980 referendum had resulted in a victory for the autonomy initiative in seven out of eight provinces but Almería where, at 42.3% of the electorate under a turnout of 51.1%, the "Yes" vote did not reach the required majority of 50% of all those eligible to vote. Negotiations ensured to resolve the deadlock, which threatened to bog down the entire autonomic process, was resolved in October 1980 through two legal amendments: the first, a modification of the Referendum Law allowing for the approval of the Article 151 autonomy initiative in the provinces having met the 50%-over-electorate threshold, and the possibility to make the initiative extendable to those provinces within the same region not meeting this requirement—such as the case of Almería—as long as it was requested by a majority of the elected members of that province within the Cortes Generales; the second, an organic law approving this mechanism for the province of Almería by applying it retroactively to the 28 February referendum result. Both amendments would be definitely approved by the Cortes Generales on 11 November 1980.

The final phase of negotiations over the draft Statute started immediately thereafter, and on 1 March 1981 the text was approved by a 70–6 vote in the regional Assembly of Parliamentarians, with a consensus between and the Spanish Socialist Workers' Party (PSOE), the Union of the Democratic Centre (UCD) and the Communist Party of Spain (PCE) and the only opposition of the Socialist Party of Andalusia (PSA). The next step in the process was the favourable dictum of the Constitutional Commission of the Congress of Deputies, which was obtained on 30 June, and the subsequent ratification of the Statute in referendum.

The referendum for the ratification of the draft Statute had been initially scheduled for June or September 1981, but delays in the parliamentary transaction of the text until July pushed the referendum date to October, with the vote scheduled be held concurrently with the 1981 Galician regional election. The referendum was called by a royal decree published in the Official State Gazette on 26 August 1981, which set the date for Tuesday, 20 October 1981.

== Campaign ==
Party policies
| Position | Parties | Ref. |
|---|---|---|
| Yes | Spanish Socialist Workers' Party (PSOE) | |
| Yes | Union of the Democratic Centre (UCD) | |
| Yes | Communist Party of Spain (PCE) | |
| Yes | Socialist Party of Andalusia–Andalusian Party (PSA–PA) | |
| Yes | Andalusian Unity (UA) | |
| No | Party of Labour of Spain (PTE) | |

Campaigning was less intense than in the 1980 referendum, with all the main political parties now supporting the approval of the Statute. President Rafael Escuredo criticized the "cold tone" of the campaign, and called on all parties to make a special insistence on requesting the affirmative vote in the referendum. Noteworthy of the general apathy of the campaign was that parties had a limited activity in towns and cities, while the number of organized events was far from the usual in an election campaign. Only during the final days of campaigning did some national leaders attend, including Prime Minister Leopoldo Calvo-Sotelo, former prime minister Adolfo Suárez and the main opposition leader Felipe González, but the general impression was that turnout would be visibly lower than in the 1980 referendum.

Party slogans
| Parties | Original slogan | English translation | Ref. |
|---|---|---|---|
| PSOE | « El Estatuto, vale » | "The Statute [is] enough" | |
| UCD | « Nuestro futuro es nuestro » | "Our future is ours" | |
| PCE | « Paro al paro, nuestra tierra, sí » | "Stop unemployment; our land, yes" | |
| PSA–PA | « Sí en el referéndum, para superar este Estatuto en el Parlamento andaluz » | "Yes in the referendum, to overcome this Statute in the Andalusian Parliament" | |

== Opinion polls ==
The table below lists voting intention estimates in reverse chronological order, showing the most recent first and using the dates when the survey fieldwork was done, as opposed to the date of publication. Where the fieldwork dates are unknown, the date of publication is given instead. The highest percentage figure in each polling survey is displayed with its background shaded in the leading choice's colour. The "Lead" columns on the right show the percentage-point difference between the "Yes" and "No" choices in a given poll.

| Polling firm/Commissioner | Fieldwork date | Sample size | Total | | | | | | Considering only Yes/No totals | | |
| Polling firm/Commissioner | Fieldwork date | Sample size | Yes | No | Invalid/ Blank | X mark | Question | Lead | Yes | No | Lead |
|---|---|---|---|---|---|---|---|---|---|---|---|
| 1981 referendum | 20 Oct 1981 | —N/a | 47.8 | 3.7 | 1.9 | 46.5 | – | 44.1 | 92.7 | 7.3 | 85.4 |
| ECO/CIS | 9–12 Oct 1981 | 6,462 | 60.6 | 1.5 | 1.4 | 4.3 | 32.2 | 59.1 | 97.5 | 2.5 | 95.0 |
| Regional Government | 9 Oct 1981 | 2,400 | 43.0 | 4.0 | – | 18.0 | 35.0 | 39.0 | 91.0 | 9.0 | 82.0 |
| Regional Government | 9 Jun 1981 | 4,000 | 49.0 | 4.0 | – | 12.0 | 35.0 | 45.0 | 92.0 | 8.0 | 84.0 |

== Results ==
=== Overall ===
Question

Do you approve of the Statute of Autonomy of Andalusia Bill?

| Choice | Votes | % |
|---|---|---|
| For | 2,172,577 | 92.74 |
| Against | 170,190 | 7.26 |
| Total | 2,342,767 | 100.00 |
| Valid votes | 2,342,767 | 96.39 |
| Invalid/blank votes | 87,836 | 3.61 |
| Total votes | 2,430,603 | 100.00 |
| Registered voters/turnout | 4,543,836 | 53.49 |
Source: Regional Government of Andalusia

=== Results by province ===
| Province | Electorate | Turnout | Yes | | No | |
| Province | Electorate | Turnout | Votes | % | Votes | % |
|---|---|---|---|---|---|---|
| Almería | 285,699 | 44.37 | 109,426 | 89.95 | 12,228 | 10.05 |
| Cádiz | 689,367 | 49.98 | 314,679 | 94.92 | 16,842 | 5.08 |
| Córdoba | 531,456 | 61.92 | 294,850 | 92.73 | 23,101 | 7.27 |
| Granada | 547,285 | 51.20 | 243,890 | 90.43 | 25,809 | 9.57 |
| Huelva | 299,136 | 52.14 | 142,072 | 94.74 | 7,891 | 5.26 |
| Jaén | 481,521 | 57.59 | 239,077 | 89.26 | 28,760 | 10.74 |
| Málaga | 684,292 | 51.79 | 316,210 | 92.63 | 25,160 | 7.37 |
| Seville | 1,025,080 | 54.86 | 512,373 | 94.40 | 30,399 | 5.60 |
| Total | 4,543,836 | 53.49 | 2,172,577 | 92.74 | 170,190 | 7.26 |

== Aftermath ==
The referendum resulted in a massive support for the draft Statute, albeit on a turnout of 53.5%, compared to 64.2% in the 1980 referendum. This was met with satisfaction from all political parties, which had feared abstention rates could be reach or surpass the 50% threshold. Among the reasons for the lower turnout were said to contribute: the low-profile campaigns of political parties; the coincidence with the Galician regional election, which drew the attention of the parties' leaderships and of the media; that the referendum received a lower coverage from state media than the one received by the Basque and Catalan referendums in October 1979; as well as because approval was taken for granted due to the lack of a minimum of affirmative ballots over the electorate as well as there being no appreciable threat from the "No" camp.

With the Statute ratified in referendum, it would be sent to the Cortes Generales for its final consideration and ratification, with this process slowing down over an appeal from far-right New Force (FN) party on the results. The Congress of Deputies subsequently ratified the Statute on 17 December, with the Senate doing likewise on 23 December. The text received royal assent on the 30th and was published in the Official State Gazette on 11 January 1982, with the date for the first regional election being set for 23 May 1982 after negotiations between the central and regional governments.

== See also ==
- 1980 Andalusian autonomy initiative referendum
- 1980 Galician Statute of Autonomy referendum
- 1982 Andalusian regional election
- 2007 Andalusian Statute of Autonomy referendum
