= 1979 Basque Statute of Autonomy referendum =

Referendum in the Spanish region of the Basque Country

- 25 October 1979
- "Do you approve of the Statute of Autonomy of the Basque Country Bill?"
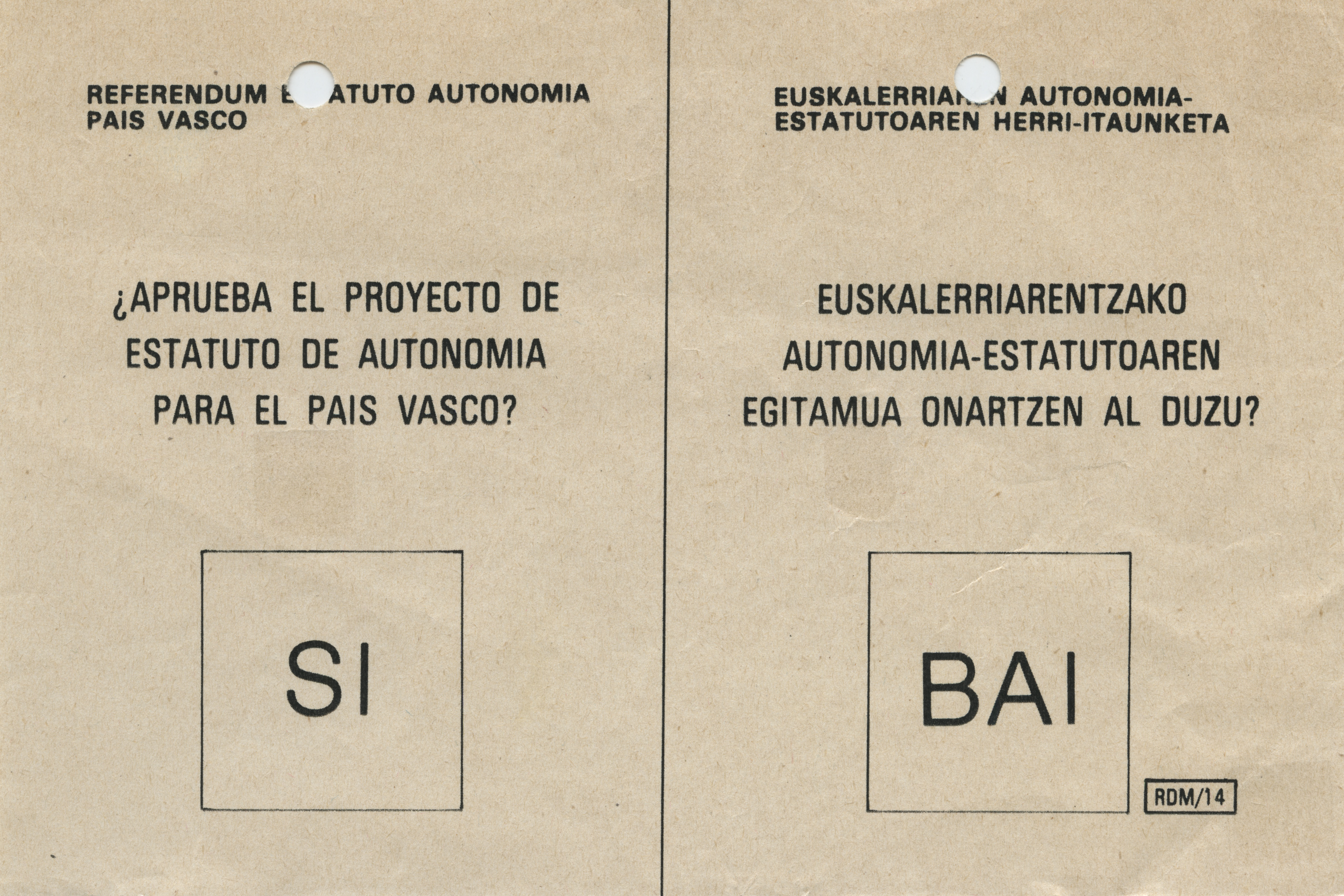
- "Yes" ballot for the referendum in Spanish (left) and in Basque (right).

Results
Choice	Votes	%
Yes	831,839	94.60%
No	47,529	5.40%
Valid votes	879,368	95.43%
Invalid or blank votes	42,068	4.57%
Total votes	921,436	100.00%
Registered voters/turnout	1,565,541	58.86%

A referendum on the approval of the Basque Statute of Autonomy was held in the Basque Country on Thursday, 25 October 1979. Voters were asked whether they ratified a proposed Statute of Autonomy of the Basque Country bill organizing the historical territories of Álava, Biscay and Gipuzkoa into an autonomous community of Spain. The final draft of the bill had been approved by the Basque parliamentary assembly on 29 December 1978, but it required ratification through a binding referendum and its subsequent approval by the Spanish Cortes Generales, as established by Article 151 of the Spanish Constitution of 1978.

The question asked was "Do you approve of the Statute of Autonomy of the Basque Country Bill?" (Spanish: ¿Aprueba el proyecto de Estatuto de Autonomía para el País Vasco?). The referendum resulted in 94.6% of valid votes in support of the bill on a turnout of 58.9%. Once approved, the bill was submitted to the consideration of the Cortes Generales, which accepted it on 29 November (in the Congress of Deputies) and 12 December (in the Spanish Senate), receiving royal assent on 18 December and published in the Official State Gazette on 22 December 1979.

== Results ==
=== Overall ===
Question

Do you approve of the Statute of Autonomy of the Basque Country Bill?

Choice	Votes	%
For	831,839	94.60
Against	47,529	5.40
Total	879,368	100.00
Valid votes	879,368	95.43
Invalid/blank votes	42,068	4.57
Total votes	921,436	100.00
Registered voters/turnout	1,565,541	58.86
Source: Basque Government

=== Results by province ===
Province	Electorate	Turnout	Yes		No	
Province	Electorate	Turnout	Votes	%	Votes	%
Álava	174,930	63.23	92,535	90.23	10,023	9.77
Biscay	883,609	57.49	460,905	94.81	25,216	5.19
Gipuzkoa	507,002	59.73	278,399	95.77	12,290	4.23
Total	1,565,541	58.86	831,839	94.60	47,529	5.40

== See also ==
- 1979 Catalan Statute of Autonomy referendum
- 1980 Andalusian autonomy initiative referendum
- 1980 Galician Statute of Autonomy referendum
- 1981 Andalusian Statute of Autonomy referendum
