= Women's suffrage in the Spanish Second Republic period =

Women's suffrage in the Spanish Second Republic period was the result of efforts dating back to the mid-1800s. Women and men working towards universal suffrage had to combat earlier feminist goals that prioritized social goals, including access to education, political rights such as a woman's right to vote and equal wages. As a middle class developed and women gained more access to education, they began to focus more on the issue of suffrage but this was often around specific ideological philosophies; it was not tied into a broader working class movement calling for women's emancipation.

Between 1877 and 1930, several attempts were made to give women the right to vote. The Dictatorship of Primo de Rivera would see a two-year period where women held the right to vote, from 1924 to 1926. Because of a move from an elected congress to an appointed government, no elections were held in this period and women never went to the polls. Unsuccessful attempts to give women suffrage also took place in 1877, 1907, 1908 and 1918. Despite this, Primo de Rivera's royal decree and the arguments put forward in that period would prove influential during the debate in the period to come.

The Second Republic would see women granted full emancipation, including the right to vote, on 1 October 1931 with women going to the polls only twice: on 2 November 1933 and again in 1936. The right to vote came after the passing of a constitution after elections in June 1931. Both sides of the suffrage movement had women representing their causes in one of the greatest duels between Spanish parliamentarians. Clara Campoamor Rodríguez represented those seeking full emancipation for women, while the left-leaning Victoria Kent Siano represented conservative and Republican views seeking to prevent women's right to vote. Campoamor claimed that women's access to the ballot box was an ethical obligation for the Congress and that Spanish women had won it having battled on behalf of the Republic for a long time. Kent argued women were not yet ready to vote as they were not sufficiently educated to make an informed decision, submitting to the wishes of their husbands and the Church, a position supported by the conservatives although they had different reasons for resisting women's suffrage.

Following Francisco Franco's victory in the Spanish Civil War, neither women nor men would be able to vote in national elections until 1977, two years after his death.

== Prelude to the Second Republic (1800 - 1922) ==
Spanish women did not hold the same status as citizens as men from 1800 to 1931. Single Spanish women enjoyed a few more legal rights than their married peers once they reached the age of 23. At that point, unmarried women could sign contracts and run businesses on their own behalf. Married women needed the approval or involvement of their husbands to undertake such matters as changing their address, accepting an inheritance, or owning property or a business. All women in this period were denied the right to vote or run for political office. Catholicism played a huge role in Spanish political thinking in the nineteenth and early twentieth century. Religion required strict gender roles, which led to the repression of Spanish women and fostered ingrained sexism across the whole of Spanish society. Society, through the Catholic Church, dictated that the role of women was to marry and bear children. They were to be invisible in society outside the domestic sphere. Violations of these norms was often met with violence.

Near universal male suffrage in Spain dated only to 1890. The first vote related to women's suffrage came in May 1877, when seven deputies in the conservative congress, suggested giving women the right to vote if they were of legal age, heads of households exercising parental authority. This initiative failed and would not be revisited for another 30 years.

Suffrage as an in issue appeared in women's publications in places like Valencia, the Balearic Islands and Barcelona from the late 1900s to the early 1930s, but were often part of a demand for female emancipation through education and broader changes in laws to protect social changes as women increasingly entered the workforce. Benita Asas Manterola, Pilar Fernández Selfa, Carmen González Bravo and Joaquín Latorre were among the more important voices in newspapers in this regard. Overall, feminists movements were much more concerned with providing women with an education that was equitable to that of men instead of securing the right to vote. Women like Belén Sárraga and Ana Carvia created the Asociación General Femenina in 1897, and other women created La Unión Femenina in 1895 in Huelva, La Federación Provincial in 1898 in Málaga and Hijas de la Regeneración that same year in Cádiz. Their efforts would lead to women having the right to attend university recognized by Ministerio Público in 1910.

During this period, the Partido Socialista Obrero Español (PSOE) did not generally want to address women's rights as they saw the movement as bourgeois. They wanted to focus on union organization. This contrasted little from the international socialist movement, which always had problems with feminism and women's rights. The International Socialist Congress, Stuttgart 1907 issued a statement in favor of women's suffrage, but said the movement needed to come from the proletariat. The conditional support was because men believed that women's rights should only come after universal male suffrage. Including women's suffrage more openly would hinder their efforts. The limited inclusion came about as a result First International Conference of Socialist Women which was being held concurrently in the same building.

For a brief time between July 1907, Congressional President Antonio Maura had discussed the possibility of giving women the right to vote under limited conditions, including they were widowed heads of households and they paid their taxes. Despite being aided by the left and by Republicans, Maura's efforts proved ineffectual even with conditions requiring heads of household status and no possibility of women running for office; there was no perceived pressing social need by the conservative majority to give women to vote, and more important domestic problems like a war with Morocco were on the horizons, along with an economic recession.

A year later, Count of Casa-Valencia, this time in the Senate, with support from Francisco Pi y Arsuaga in the Congress, would press the issue again. The 1908 attempt lacked restrictions that Maura had been willing to make to see its passage. It would have allowed all women aged 23 and older to vote. Unlike the 1907 efforts, the 1908 votes came within a few votes of passing. According to Concha Fagoaga, for the first time, those that argued against women's suffrage argued that it would lead to disastrous political results, and women would be overly influenced by Church officials. This was the first time a woman had argued along these lines, and it would soon be taken up by others. Carmen de Burgos wrote in a newspaper that year of the parliamentary debate in 1908, "while the English fight in a devilish way for their civic ideals, while the French claim to affirm in laws the guarantee of their selfishness, while the Russians know how to die protesting from tyranny, we, the Spanish, remain indifferent to everything." Margarita Nelken wrote in El Fígaro at the time that "putting a vote in the hands of women is today, in Spain, performing one of the greater yearnings of the reactionary element so that Spanish women, really lovers of freedom, must be the first to postpone their own interest for the progress of Spain." Nelken did not believe Spanish women were ready to vote as they were not educated enough to do so, a position she continued to hold for more than 25 years. The suffrage topic was brought up again in 1919, with Manuel de Burgos y Mazo, a conservative lawmaker, raising it in Congress, with the goal of tabling legislation to have a vote on women's right to vote. With no support, his initiative did not even come up for a vote though it would inspire feminists over the next two years. A petition then was put before the Cámara in 1919 that Parliament should address the issue of women's suffrage again. This was followed up in February 1920 with Valencia's Progreso de la Mujer also creating a petition for the matter to be considered. Cruzada de Mujeres Españolas, led by Carmen de Burgos, would again try to get parliament to address the issue, by giving equality in the vote and in terms of broader civil and political rights.

National Association of Spanish Women (ANME) was founded in 1918. Headed by María Espinosa, it lobbied for women's right to vote. The Female Republican Union was created by Clara Campoamor to advocate for women's suffrage in Spain. Campoamor, María Lejárraga and Regina García established the Foundation for Women to advocate for women's legal equality in Spain during the Second Republic. Their argument for women having the right to vote was largely based upon ideological grounds.

Starting in the 1920s, the efforts of women to get the right to vote intensified as part of a broader western movement that saw women demanding equal rights. These efforts post-dated efforts in other Western countries like the United States, France and Great Britain because feminism in Spain did not emerge as a powerful movement until much later as a result of a delay in the emergence of a Spanish middle class. Suffrage as a topic among this feminist group would largely disappear from 1918 until 1931, as women focused more on social changes than on political goals.

The socialist Lidia Falcón argued that the Socialist men's position would deter women from adhering to the party, or would result in only including women who believed in subservience to men. Falcón further argued this position would make feminists enemies of the party, a development that was born out by 1921, when Socialist men decided that to stop any attempt to promote the rights of women as they did not believe it was the time to push for electoral reforms.

== Dictatorship of Primo de Rivera (1923-1930) ==
When political activity occurred by women in the pre-Republican period, it was often spontaneous. Although they were also often ignored by left-wing male political leaders, their riots and protests represented increasing political awareness of the need for women to be more active in social and political spheres to enact change in order to improve their lives.

The 8 March 1924 Royal Decree's Municipal Statue Article 51 for the first time included an appendix which would allow electoral authorities on a municipal level to list women over the age of 23 who were not controlled by male guardians or the state to be counted. Article 84.3 said unmarried women could vote in municipal elections assuming they were the head of household, over the age of 23, not prostitutes and their status did not change. Changes were made the following month that allowed women who met these qualifications to run for political office. Consequently, some women took advantage of this political opening, ran for office and won some seats as councilors and mayors in municipal governments where elections were held. This was a surprise move by Primo de Rivera in giving women the right to vote, and was largely viewed as a way of shoring up his electoral base ahead of scheduled elections the following year. This brief period saw many political parties try to capture the women's vote before the elections were eventually cancelled. Manuel Cordero of El Socialista wrote in June 1924 of a right wing view stating that "the feminine vote supposes a revolutionary act and it seems strange that it is a reactionary who has projected this reform in Spain." Socialist representative María Cambrils was pleased with women being given the right to vote, but balked at the restrictions placed upon female voters. PSOE's leader Andrés Saborit also supported this claiming that socialism needed to expand on how it saw women as transformational agents in society, and not allow the Catholic Church to monopolize on how women were defined in Spanish culture. Some Catholics tried to capitalize on this for their own political interests, achieving success when local elections in some places saw 40% of their total votes come from women. By the time of the next national elections, the constitution giving women the right to vote was no longer in force as a new constitution was being drafted. The arguments made around the 1924 Royal Decree would later play a critical role in the debates around women's suffrage in the Second Republic.

Women gained access to national representation during the 1927–1929 legislative period as a result of the Decree of 12 September 1927. Its Article 15 stated: "to it may belong, without distinction, men and women, single, widowed or married, these duly authorized by their husbands and as long as they do not belong to the Assembly [...]. Its designation will be made nominally and by order of the Presidency, agreed in the Council of Ministers before October 6 next."

The 1927–1929 session also began the process of drafting a new Spanish constitution that would have fully franchised women voters in Article 55. The article was not approved. Despite this, women were eligible to serve in the national assembly in the Congreso de los Diputados, and 15 women were appointed to seats on 10 October 1927. Thirteen were members of the National Life Activities Representatives (Spanish: Representantes de Actividades de la Vida Nacional). Another two were State Representatives (Spanish: Representantes del Estado). These women included María de Maeztu, Micaela Díaz Rabaneda and Concepción Loring Heredia. During the Congreso de los Diputados's inaugural session in 1927, the President of the Assembly specifically welcomed the new women, claiming their exclusion had been unjust.

The abdication of king of Spain in 1930 would spell the end of the dictatorship of Miguel Primo de Rivera, and usher in the era of the Second Republic.

== Second Spanish Republic (1931–1937) ==
One of the most important aspects of the Second Republic for women is that they were formally allowed to enter the public sphere en masse. The period also saw a number of rights available to women for the first time, including suffrage, divorce and access to higher education. These resulted from feminist activities that pre-dated the Second Republic and continued throughout its durationg.

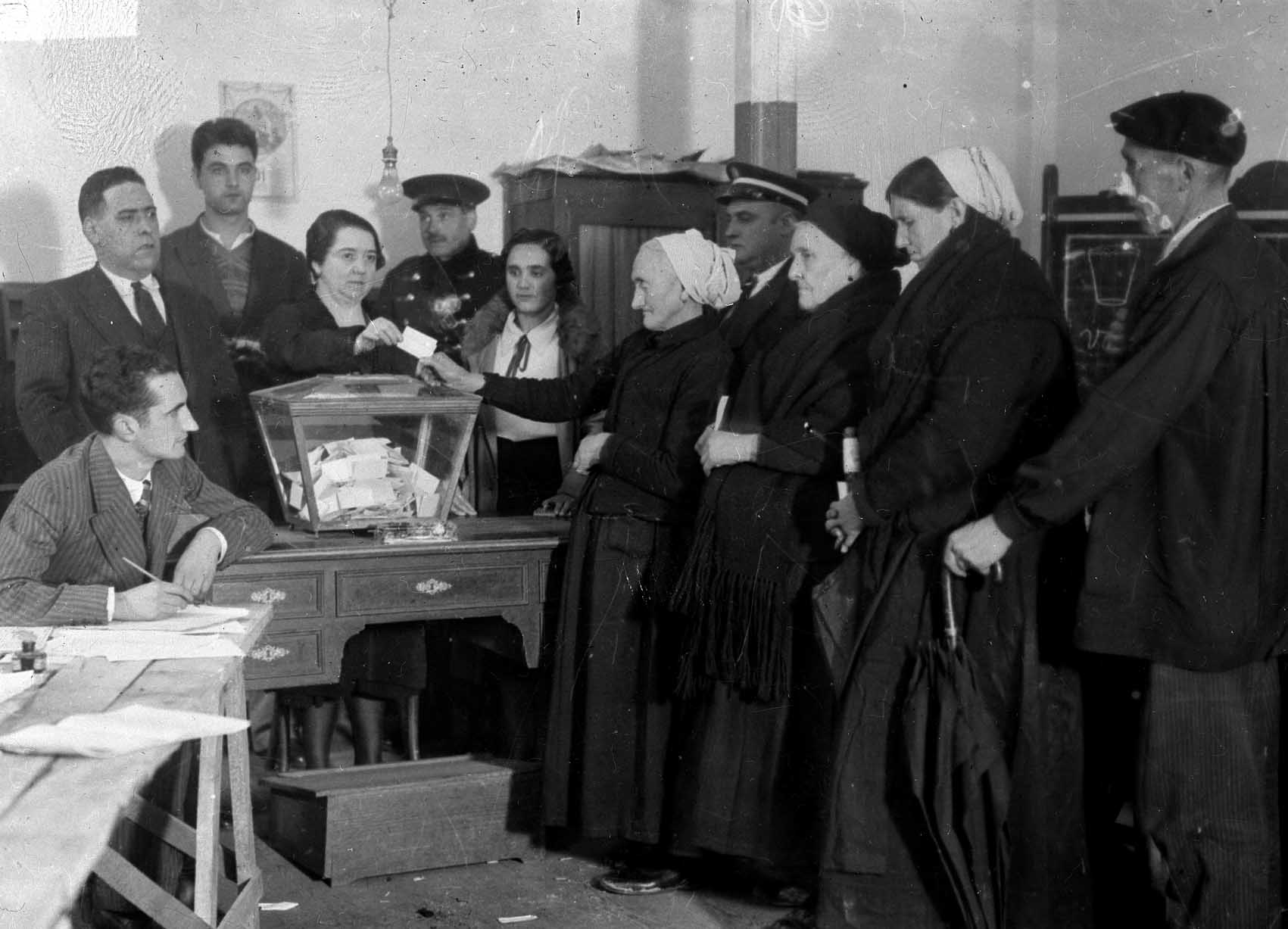
Women exercising the right to vote during the Second Spanish Republic, 5th of November 1933.

One of the first laws implemented in the Second Republic following the approval of a new constitution allowed women to vote and to run for political office. This was covered under Article 36 of Chapter III of the Constitution of the Second Republic, and came into force on 1 October 1931. The first women to win seats in the Cortes were Clara Campoamor Rodríguez, Victoria Kent Siano and Margarita Nelken y Mansbergen. They won these seats in June 1931, several months before women were given the right to vote. They were joined in February 1936 by Matilde de la Torre, Dolores Ibárruri and Federica Montseny. Nelken and Kent had both opposed giving women's suffrage, arguing most women would vote for conservatives because of the influence of their husbands and the clergy, thus undermining the Spanish Republic. Campoamor, in contrast, was a strong advocate of women's suffrage. The duel between Campoamor and Kent over women's suffrage was the most significant of its kind in Spain's parliamentary history. The measure in the constitution passed on 1 October 1931 as Article 36, stating, "Citizens of either sex, over twenty-three years of age, shall have the same electoral rights as determined by the laws." Despite Nelken's opposition to women's suffrage, PSOE members overwhelmingly supported the issue when it came to the vote with 161 in favor and 131 against. 83 of Nelken's fellow 115 PSOE deputies supported the motion. With its passage, Spain became the first Latin country to offer universal suffrage. The inclusion was supported by Article II of the new constitution, which provided equality under the law for both sexes.

Montseny became Spain's first female minister, serving as the Minister of Health and Public Assistance from September 1936 to May 1937.

=== Elections in the Second Republic ===
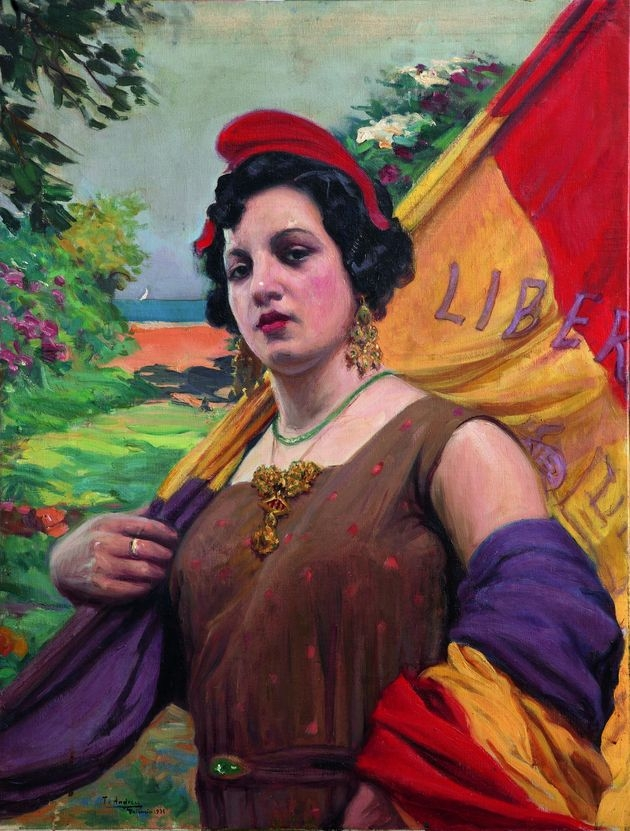
"República Española" (1931) by painter Teodoro Andreu.

The Spanish monarchy ended in 1931. Following this and the end of the Dictatorship of Primo de Rivera, the Second Republic was formed, with three elections before it was replaced by the Franco dictatorship. These elections were held in 1931, 1933 and 1936.

==== June 1931 Elections ====
Following the failure of the Primo de Rivera dictatorship, Spain set about writing a constitution. The initial draft did not give women the right to vote, though it did give them the right to run for office on 8 May 1931 for the June elections. Women would be unable to vote until the following election cycle. Three women won seats in Spain's national congress, the Cortes, in the 1931 elections: Clara Campoamor Rodríguez, Victoria Kent Siano and Margarita Nelken y Mansbergen.

Campoamor, in arguing for women's suffrage before the Cortes on 1 October 1931, that women were not being given the right to vote as a prize, but as a reward for fighting for the Republic. Women protested the war in Morocco, those in Zaragoza protested the war in Cuba, while even larger numbers protested the closure of Ateneo de Madrid by the government of Primo de Rivera. Campoamor also argued that women's inclusion was fundamental to saving the Republic by having a politically engaged populace, so that the errors of the French Republic would not be repeated. Her speech in the Cortes, called the 1 - 0 speech, said, "Women! How can you say that when women show signs of life by the Republic shall be granted as a reward for the right to vote? Have they not fought women for the Republic? Is that in speaking with praise Women workers and university women are not singing their capacity? [...] How can it be said that women have not fought and need a period, long years of the Republic, to demonstrate their capacity? The men?"

Kent, in contrast, received much more support from Spain's right, including Catholics and traditionalists, during this period of constitutional debate as she, alongside Nelken, opposed women's suffrage. Kent and Campoamor became involved in a grand debate over the issue, receiving large amounts of press related to their arguments around women's suffrage. They, like many others on the conservative side, believed that women were not educated enough to vote, and that their votes would be little more than proxy votes for men and the Catholic Church. Kent stated: "It is not a matter of capacity, it is a matter of opportunity for the Republic. [...] To become attached to an ideal, time is needed to experience it. [...] And were women liberated in their conscience, I would rise today in front of all the Cortes to ask for the feminine vote." The day of the vote, Kent said, "It is necessary, honorable deputies, to postpone the feminine vote because I would need to see the mothers in the street as a criterion for supporting it, asking for schools for their children." Nelken compared the need for women's suffrage to that of Prussian peasant women in 1807. They would not know what to do with emancipation, and would tremble with fear at the thought of not having someone tell them what to do.

==== 1933 Elections ====
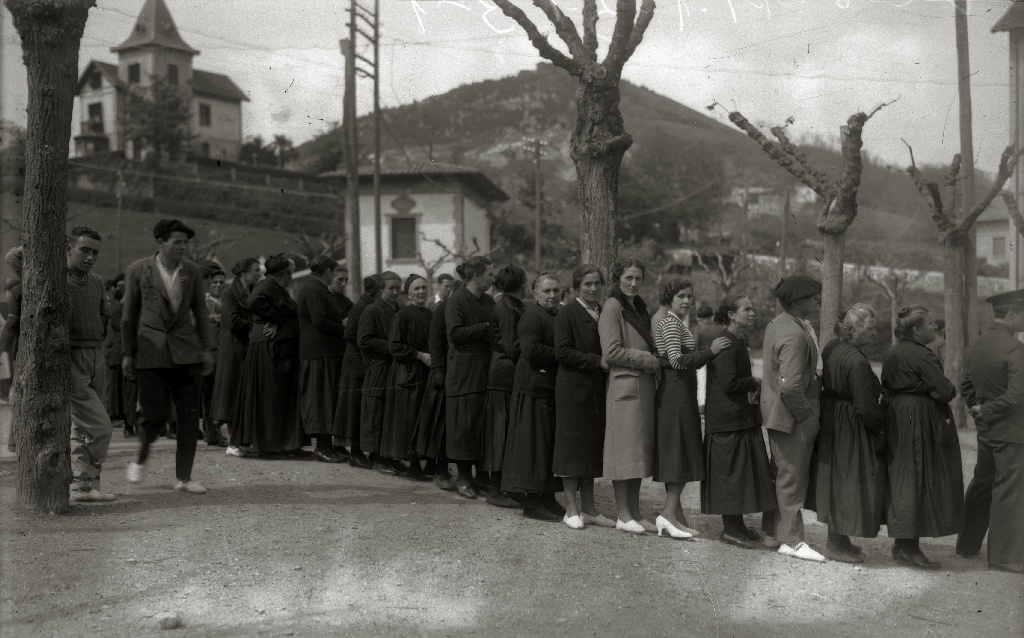
Men and women wait at Escuela Biteri in Hernani to vote in the 1933 elections.

For the first time, for the 19 November 1933 elections, women were permitted to vote in the national elections. They had earned the constitutional right to vote after the measure was adopted on 1 October 1931. In many places, the number of women exceeded the number of men at the polls, with over seven million women casting a ballot. The victory of conservative factions in the 1933 elections was blamed on women, and their voting practices in that election. They were viewed as being controlled by the Church. Basque women were able to go to the polls in a regional autonomy referendum 15 days before the national elections on 5 November 1933. La Voz de Guipúzcoa newspaper in Donostia said of the day, "It was Sunday when, for the first time in our city, the women went to the ballotbox, consulted for the issue of their vote in favor of the Statute. And the woman answered, coming in greater numbers than the male at first hour, as soon as the tables were set up at eight o'clock in the morning."

Campoamor, along with Kent, lost her seat in the Cortes following the 1933 elections. The most active of the three women elected in 1931, she had been heckled in the congress during her two-year term for supporting divorce. She continued to serve in government with an appointment as head of Public Welfare later that year. However, she left her post in 1934 protesting the government response to the 1934 Revolution of Asturias.

Nelken faced similar problems in the Cortes. Her mother was French and her father was a German Jew. As a consequence, before she was allowed to sit in 1931, Nelken had to go through special bureaucratic procedures to insure she was a naturalized Spanish citizen. Her political interests were looked down upon by her male peers, including Prime Minister Manuel Azaña. Her feminist beliefs worried and threatened her male colleagues in the Cortes. Despite this, she was re-elected in 1933, facing attacks in the media. She proved a constant irritant to male party members who sometimes resorted to racist attacks in the Cortes to quieten her down. Still, she persevered, winning at the elections in 1931, 1933 and 1936. Disillusionment with the party led her to change membership to the Communist Party in 1937.

=== Women's political organizations ===
==== Female Republican Union ====
Clara Campoamor created the Female Republican Union (Unión Republicana de Mujeres) during the early part of the Second Republic. The Female Republican Union was interested only in advocating for women's suffrage, maintaining that women having the right to vote was the only ethical option available to the government. It was often polemicist in its opposition to Kent's group Foundation for Women, and its opposition to women's suffrage.

==== Foundation for Women ====
Victoria Kent and Margarita Nelken founded the Foundation for Women (Asociación Nacional de Mujeres Española) in 1918. The Foundation for Women was a radical socialist organization at its inception, aligning with the PSOE. The organization opposed women's suffrage, even as its founders sat in the Cortes. The belief was if women were given the right to vote, most would vote as instructed by their husbands and the Catholic Church. This would fundamentally damage the secular nature of the Second Republic, by bringing in a democratically elected right-wing government.

== Spanish Civil War (1936–1939) and Francoist Spain (1938–1973) ==
No elections were held during the Spanish Civil War. Following the victory of fascist forces, the rights of both men and women were severely limited. Spain became a single-party state. Suffrage in the elections to the "family third" of the local councils and the consultative Cortes Españolas (in 1967 and 1971) was limited to householders (men or widows) and, since 1967-68, married women of adult age (different ages for men and women depending also on their family situation). Men and women aged 21 or more were allowed to vote on referendums. Free elections would not be held in Spain until 1977, following the death of Franco
