= Kidnapping of Anabel Segura =

1993 Spanish kidnapping and murder case

- Anabel Segura photo released to media during search
- Location: 40.5184°N 3.6097°W; Kidnapping: La Moraleja, Madrid, Spain; Murder: Numancia de la Sagra, Toledo, Spain
- Date: 12 April 1993; 33 years ago
- Attack type: Murder by strangulation, kidnapping
- Victim: Anabel Segura
- Perpetrators: Emilio Muñoz Guadix; Candido Ortiz Aon
- No. of participants: 2
- Motive: Money
- Verdict: Guilty
- Convictions: Murder; Kidnapping
- Sentence: 43 years in prison

On 12 April 1993, Anabel Segura, a 22-year-old university student, was kidnapped by Emilio Muñoz Guadix with the assistance of his friend, Cándido "Candi" Ortiz Aon. She was abducted while jogging in La Moraleja, Madrid, Spain. The kidnappers, having made no concrete plans, drove around for several hours with her. When Segura attempted to escape, they took her to an abandoned factory in Numancia de la Sagra, Toledo, where they strangled her and buried her body on the premises.

Although Segura had been killed on the day of her abduction, Muñoz and Ortiz continued to contact her family in the subsequent months, demanding a large ransom in exchange for her supposed release. However, they never appeared at the agreed-upon meeting points to collect the money. In June 1993, two months after the kidnapping, the perpetrators sent the family a tape recording of Felisa García, Muñoz's wife, impersonating Segura.

On 28 September 1995, nearly two and a half years after the murder, Muñoz and Ortiz were arrested and confessed to the kidnapping and killing of Segura. They also disclosed the location of her remains. García was also arrested for her involvement in the deception. In 1999, Muñoz and Ortiz were each sentenced to 43 years in prison.

Segura's case received widespread media attention in Spain and was described as one that "shocked Spanish society." Media outlets continued to follow developments in the case for two years after the abduction.

== Background ==
=== Victim ===
Anabel Segura Foles was a 22-year-old woman from La Moraleja, an affluent residential district in the municipality of Alcobendas, located in the northern part of the Community of Madrid, Spain. She was the eldest daughter of José Segura Nájera, a businessman in the petrochemical sector, and his German wife, Sigrid Foles. Her father had established his business in Germany, where he met and married Sigrid. The couple later returned to Spain to raise Anabel and her younger sister, Sandra, in a wealthy golf community. Segura was a fourth-year business student at ICADE University.

=== Kidnappers ===
Emilio Muñoz Guadix and his wife, Felisa García, relocated from Vallecas, Madrid, to the municipality of Pantoja in the province of Toledo in search of a better life for their family. Muñoz worked as a delivery driver in Madrid for a parcel delivery company.

Cándido Ortiz Aon, Muñoz's childhood friend, had moved to Escalona, also in the province of Toledo. He worked as a plumber and frequently travelled to Madrid for work.

== Crime ==
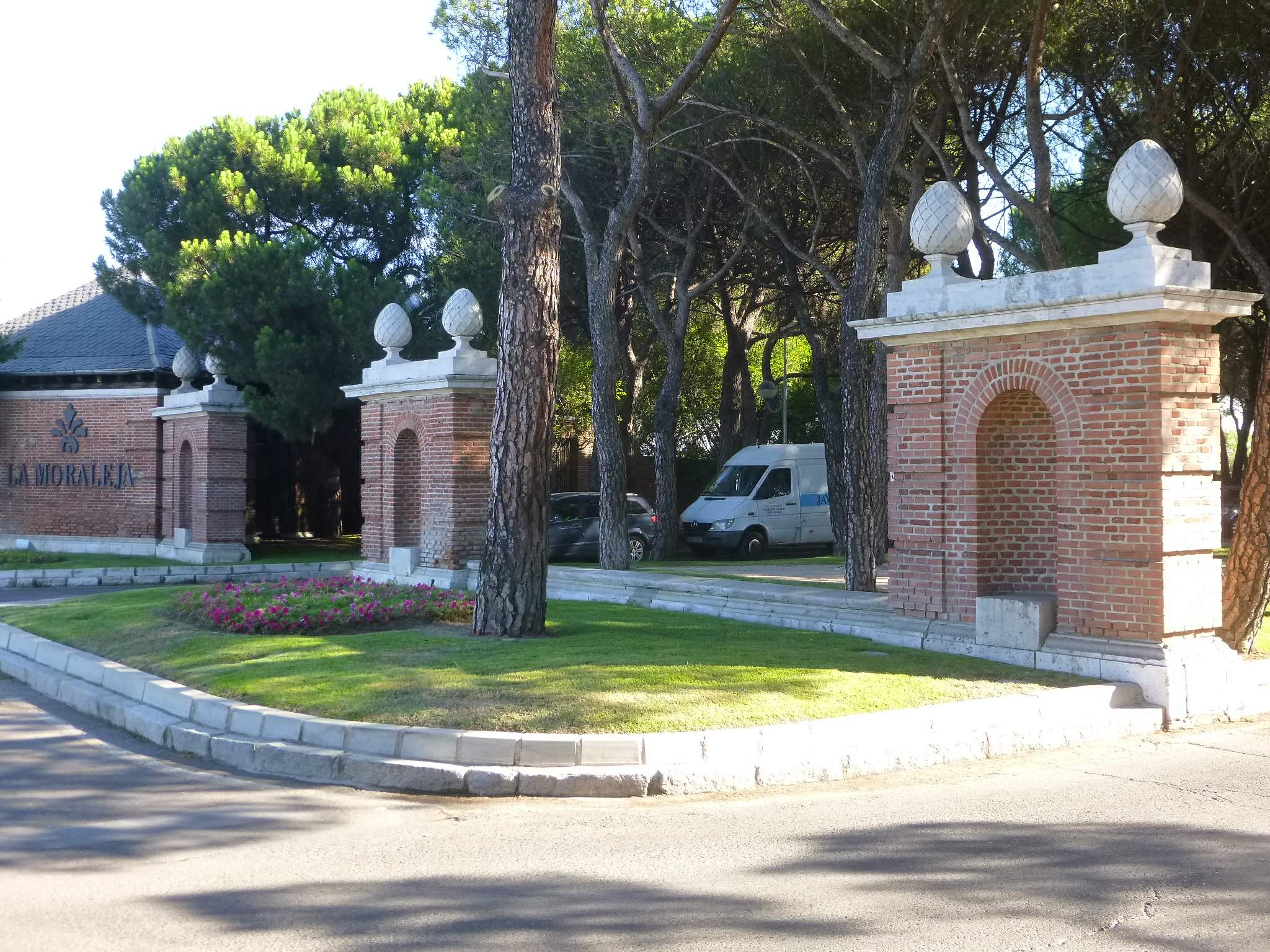
La Moraleja Urbanization, the place where Segura lived and was kidnapped.

=== Kidnapping ===
On the afternoon of 12 April 1993, Emilio Muñoz and Cándido Ortiz went to the area surrounding the La Moraleja urbanization with the intention of abducting someone. According to investigative sources, they believed the area was a "safe bingo"—an easy and lucrative target. As part of her usual routine, Anabel Segura went out jogging with a Walkman in the Intergolf neighbourhood of La Moraleja, where she resided. At the time, her family was away on vacation.

Muñoz and Ortiz exited a white van and threatened Segura at knifepoint. They forced her into the vehicle and drove away. During the struggle, Segura resisted, losing her tracksuit and Walkman in the process.

Antonio, a janitor at the nearby Scandinavian School, witnessed the incident. However, he was unable to read the van's license plate number due to not wearing his glasses. He immediately contacted the police.

=== Murder ===
Segura attempted unsuccessfully to escape from her captors and was taken to an abandoned factory in Numancia de la Sagra, in the province of Toledo. There, she was strangled and buried nearby.

== Investigation ==
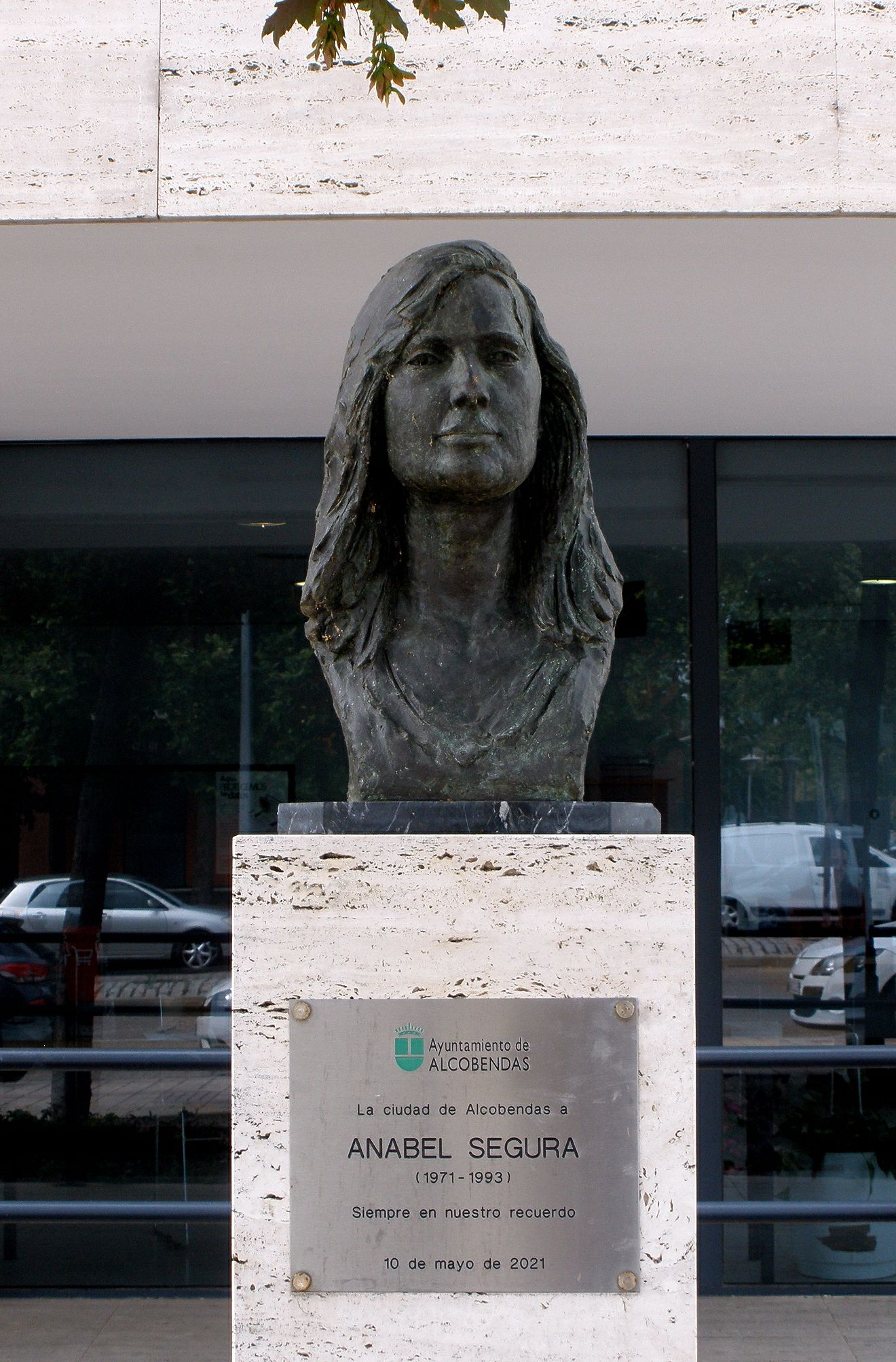
Memorial for Anabel Segura in Alcobendas, Madrid.

=== Rescue calls ===
Despite having already murdered Segura, Muñoz and Ortiz continued with their plan to demand a ransom from her family.

On 14 April 1993, two days after the kidnapping, the perpetrators demanded 150 million Spanish pesetas in exchange for Segura's "release." This was the first of fifteen calls made to the family. The Segura family appointed attorney Rafael Escuredo as their mediator. In an effort to raise the ransom, José Segura mortgaged his home and publicly offered a reward of 15 million pesetas for any credible information regarding his daughter's whereabouts. The family also enlisted the help of companies specialising in kidnapping cases. On two occasions, representatives of the family went to locations agreed upon with the kidnappers to deliver the ransom, but neither Muñoz nor Ortiz appeared to collect the money.

=== Fake tape ===
Two months after the abduction, the family received an audio recording in which a woman, claiming to be Anabel Segura, stated that she was fine while pleading to be rescued. The voice on the tape was later identified as that of Felisa García, Muñoz's wife, impersonating Segura at her husband's request.

A breakthrough in the case came when a resident of Escalona contacted the police after hearing the kidnappers' voices on a televised broadcast. The caller stated, "That is Candi's voice, the plumber from my town." On 28 September 1995, this tip led to the arrest of Ortiz, followed by the arrest of Muñoz and his wife.

=== Imprisonment ===
Following their arrest, Muñoz and Ortiz confessed and disclosed the location of Segura's body. They claimed they had not intended to kill her and had acted in hopes of receiving a reward. In 1999, both men were initially sentenced to 39 years in prison, but the Supreme Court later increased their sentences to 43 years. Felisa García was sentenced to six months in prison for her role in covering up the crime and impersonating Segura in the audio tape.

Cándido Ortiz died in prison in 2009. In 2013, Emilio Muñoz was released after serving 18 years.

== Media coverage ==
The kidnapping and murder of Anabel Segura received significant attention in the Spanish media and was described as "the case that shocked Spain." It has been compared to the case of Diana Quer, another young woman from Madrid who was kidnapped and murdered in A Pobra do Caramiña, Galicia.

== Memorial ==
On 10 May 2021, a memorial event for Anabel Segura was held near the Civic Centre named in her honour in Alcobendas, Madrid.

== See also ==
- Crime in Spain
- List of solved missing person cases: 1950–1999
