= Andalusian Unity =

Andalusian Unity Unidad Andaluza
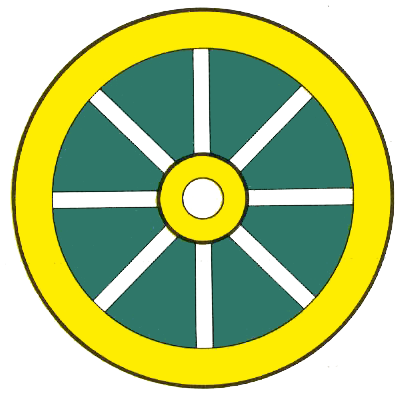
- President: Manuel Clavero
- Secretary-General: Manuel Otero Luna
- Founded: 26 December 1980
- Dissolved: 27 November 1982
- Split from: Union of the Democratic Centre
- Headquarters: Plaza de Cuba, 3, Seville, 41011
- Ideology: Andalusian nationalism Social liberalism
- Political position: Centre
- Colors: Yellow; Green; White

Andalusian Unity (Spanish: Unidad Andaluza, UA) was a political party launched in December 1980 by former minister Manuel Clavero as a split from the Union of the Democratic Centre (UCD) over disagreement with UCD's autonomic policy on the 1980 Andalusian autonomy initiative referendum. The party was officially registered on 22 January 1981. Clavero was the party's president, whereas Manuel Otero Luna was elected as secretary general.

An electoral coalition with the conservative People's Alliance (AP) was considered ahead of the 1982 Andalusian regional election, but in the end it was rejected and the party chose not to contest the election out of a lack of campaign funding. It also unsuccessfully probed a coalition with Adolfo Suárez's Democratic and Social Centre (CDS) ahead of the 1982 Spanish general election. In the end, the party was dissolved on 27 November 1982 over a lack of political and economical viability.
