= Plácido Fernández Viagas =

President of the Pre-autonomous Government of Andalusia
- In office 27 May 1978 – 2 June 1979
- Monarch: Juan Carlos I
- Preceded by: Office created
- Succeeded by: Rafael Escuredo

Personal details
- Born: Plácido Fernández Viagas; 29 March 1924 Tangier, Spanish Morocco
- Died: 8 December 1982 (aged 58)
- Party: Spanish Socialist Workers' Party of Andalusia

Plácido Fernández Viagas (29 March 1924 in Tangier – 8 December 1982 in Madrid) was a Spanish politician and judge, member of the Spanish Socialist Workers' Party of Andalusia, who was President of the pre-autonomous government of Andalusia between 1978 and 1979.

== Biography ==
He was born on March 29, 1924, in Tangier, this city being administered by a treaty that made it an International Zone. He studied his bachelor's degree at the Sacred Heart School in Tangier and his law degree at the University of Seville. He married Elisa Bartolomé, having 11 children. He practiced the judiciary in several cities, in Nador, La Palma, Tenerife and, in the Andalusian provinces of Cadiz, Huelva, Granada and Seville, where until April 1977 he was a judge in the litigation chamber of his Territorial Court.

He was a member of Justicia Democrática, a clandestine group of civil servants who fought against the Franco regime from within, as well as of Coordinación Democrática en Andalucía. He was suspended from his duties as a judge for a few months in 1976 for participating in a demonstration in favour of amnesty for political prisoners.
