= Unified Socialist Party of Andalusia =

Unified Socialist Party of Andalusia Partido Socialista Unificado de Andalucía
- Leader: Antonio Medina Molera
- Founded: 1978
- Ideology: Communism; Andalusian nationalism Antifascism; Andalusian independence
- Political position: Radical left

Unified Socialist Party of Andalusia (in Spanish: Partido Socialista Unificado de Andalucía) was an independentist and communist party in Andalusia, Spain, emerging towards the end of the 1970s. PSUA later gave birth to the Liberation Front of Andalusia (FLA).
