= Liberation Front of Andalusia =

Liberation Front of Andalusia Frente de Liberación de Andalucía
- Leader: Antonio Medina Molera
- Founded: 1978
- Dissolved: 1980
- Merger of: Independents; Unified Socialist Party of Andalusia; Nationalist Left of Andalusia
- Merged into: Yama'a Islámica de Al-Andalus
- Ideology: Revolutionary socialism Andalusian nationalism Andalusian independence
- Political position: Radical left

Liberation Front of Andalusia (Spanish: Frente de Liberación de Andalucía) was an independentist and socialist party in Andalusia, Spain.

== History ==
FLA was founded in 1978 by the Cordobés documentarist and ex-member of the Communist Party of Spain (PCE) Antonio Medina Molera. The party was also a result of the union of several splinter factions of various left movements; like the Unified Socialist Party of Andalusia (PSUA) or the Nationalist Left of Andalusia. In Catalonia the party had good relations with the Socialist Party of National Liberation (PSAN), and even gave support to the Left Bloc for National Liberation (BEAN) in the Catalan parliamentary elections of 1980.

FLA disappeared in 1980, and the majority of its members joined the Yama'a Islámica de Al-Andalus and, later, Andalusian Liberation. These new organizations wanted not only independence for Andalusia, but also to reclaim the Islamic legacy of Al Andalus.
