= Felipe Alcaraz =

Spanish politician (born 1943)

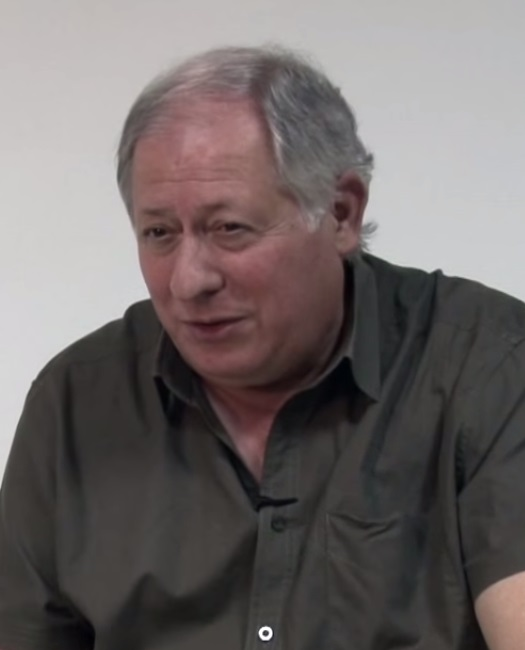
Felipe Alcaraz (2013).

Luis Felipe Alcaraz Masats (born 1 March 1943 in Granada) is a Spanish politician. He is the current Chairman of the Executive Committee of the Communist Party of Spain.

Alcaraz obtained a doctorate in philology and began as a university professor. He began his opposition to Francoism in the 1950s. In 1973 he joined the Communist Party of Spain and in 1979 joined the Central Committee and was chosen as deputy for Jaén. In 1981 he was chosen Secretary General of the Partido Comunista de Andalucía, a position that he maintained until 2002. He was chosen deputy of the Parliament of Andalusia by Seville Province in 1982, 1986 and 1990, being several times parliamentary spokesman of the PCE and IU.

From 1993 to 2004 he again sat in the Spanish Congress of Deputies representing Seville district. In 2004 he lost his seat in the general elections and attempted to challenge Gaspar Llamazares for the leadership, although he finally retired his candidacy and supported Enrique Santiago. At the 17th Federal Congress of the PCE in June 2005, supported by the Partido Comunista de Andalucía, he reached an agreement with Francisco Frutos and was chosen as Executive Chairman garnering 80% of the votes. His son, Lucas Alcaraz, is a soccer trainer, and trained at Real Murcia, until he was dismissed.
