= Rafael Escuredo =

Spanish politician and lawyer

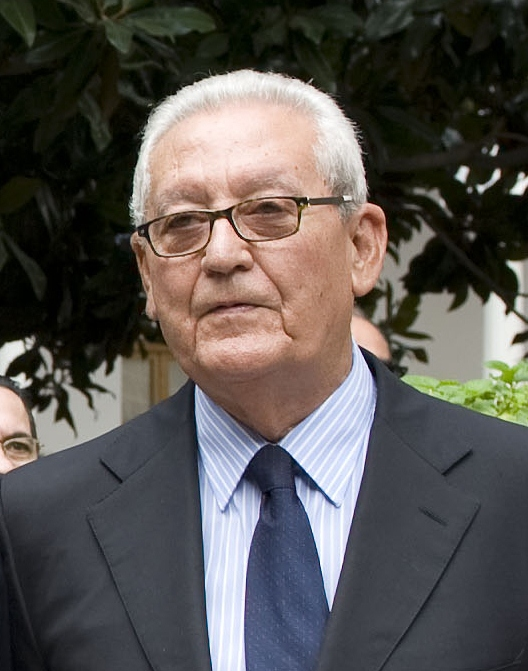

1st President of the Regional Government of Andalusia
- In office 2 June 1979 – 9 March 1984; Acting: 16 February – 9 March 1984
- Monarch: Juan Carlos I
- Deputy: José Rodríguez de la Borbolla
- Preceded by: Plácido Fernández Viagas
- Succeeded by: José Rodríguez de la Borbolla

Personal details
- Born: Rafael Escuredo Rodríguez; 16 April 1944 (age 82) Estepa, Spain
- Party: Spanish Socialist Workers' Party of Andalusia

Rafael Escuredo Rodríguez (born 16 April 1944) is a Spanish politician and lawyer, member of the Spanish Socialist Workers' Party of Andalusia, who was President of Andalusia between 1979 and 1984. After his presidency, he served as a mediator on behalf of the family of Anabel Segura when she was kidnapped in 1993.
