= 1936 Galician Statute of Autonomy referendum =

Referendum in the Spanish region of Galicia

- 4 July 1936
- Do you approve of the draft Statute of Autonomy of Galicia?

Results
Choice	Votes	%
Yes	993,351	99.38%
No	6,161	0.62%
Valid votes	999,512	99.86%
Invalid or blank votes	1,451	0.14%
Total votes	1,000,963	100.00%
Registered voters/turnout	1,343,155	74.52%

A referendum on the approval of the Galician Statute of Autonomy was held in Galicia on Saturday, 4 July 1936. Voters were asked whether they ratified a proposed draft Statute of Autonomy Galicia. Article 12 of the Spanish Constitution of 1931 allowed for Spanish provinces to be organized into "autonomous regions", provided that a regional Statute was proposed by a majority of the provinces' municipalities comprising at least two-thirds of the provincial population and that two-thirds majority of all those eligible to vote accepted the draft Statute.

The referendum resulted in 99.4% of valid votes in support of the draft Statute on a turnout of 74.5%, representing 74.0% of the electorate.This significant difference in votes between the two options was described as a "holy pucherazo" (meaning electoral fraud) by the statute's own supporters. However, the outbreak of the Spanish Civil War prevented the draft Statute from being submitted to the Spanish Cortes for its final approval.

== Results ==
Do you approve of the draft Statute of Autonomy of Galicia?
Choice	Votes	%
For	993,351	99.38
Against	6,161	0.62
Total	999,512	100.00
Valid votes	999,512	99.86
Invalid/blank votes	1,451	0.14
Total votes	1,000,963	100.00
Registered voters/turnout	1,343,155	74.52
Source: Direct Democracy

== See also ==
- 1931 Catalan Statute of Autonomy referendum
- 1933 Basque Statute of Autonomy referendum
