= 1931 Catalan Statute of Autonomy referendum =

Referendum in the Spanish region of Catalonia

- 2 August 1931
- Do you approve of the draft Statute of Autonomy of Catalonia?

Results
| Choice | Votes | % |
|---|---|---|
| Yes | 592,691 | 99.45% |
| No | 3,276 | 0.55% |
| Valid votes | 595,967 | 99.81% |
| Invalid or blank votes | 1,105 | 0.19% |
| Total votes | 597,072 | 100.00% |
| Registered voters/turnout | 792,582 | 75.33% |

A referendum on the approval of the Catalan Statute of Autonomy was held in Catalonia on Sunday, 2 August 1931. Voters were asked whether they ratified a proposed draft Statute of Autonomy of Catalonia, also known as the "Statute of Núria" (Catalan: Estatut de Núria). Article 12 of the Spanish Constitution of 1931 allowed for Spanish provinces to be organized into "autonomous regions", provided that a regional Statute was proposed by a majority of the provinces' municipalities comprising at least two-thirds of the provincial population and that two-thirds majority of all those eligible to vote accepted the draft Statute.

The referendum resulted in 99.5% of valid votes in support of the draft Statute on a turnout of 75.3%, representing 74.8% of the electorate. The draft Statute was subsequently submitted to the consideration of the Spanish Cortes, which finally approved it on 9 September 1932 with a 314–24 result.

== Results ==
Do you approve of the draft Statute of Autonomy of Catalonia?
| Choice | Votes | % |
|---|---|---|
| For | 592,691 | 99.45 |
| Against | 3,276 | 0.55 |
| Total | 595,967 | 100.00 |
| Valid votes | 595,967 | 99.81 |
| Invalid/blank votes | 1,105 | 0.19 |
| Total votes | 597,072 | 100.00 |
| Registered voters/turnout | 792,582 | 75.33 |
Source: Direct Democracy

== See also ==
- 1933 Basque Statute of Autonomy referendum
- 1936 Galician Statute of Autonomy referendum
