= 1933 Basque Statute of Autonomy referendum =

Referendum in the Spanish region of the Basque Country

- 5 November 1933
- Do you approve of the draft Statute of Autonomy of the Basque Country?

Results
Choice	Votes	%
Yes	411,756	96.67%
No	14,196	3.33%
Valid votes	425,952	92.75%
Invalid or blank votes	33,273	7.25%
Total votes	459,225	100.00%
Registered voters/turnout	490,157	93.69%

A statutory referendum on the approval of the Basque Statute of Autonomy was held in the Basque Country on Sunday, 5 November 1933. Voters were asked whether they ratified a proposed draft Statute of Autonomy of the Basque Country. Article 12 of the Spanish Constitution of 1931 allowed for Spanish provinces to be organized into "autonomous regions", provided that a regional Statute was proposed by a majority of the provinces' municipalities comprising at least two-thirds of the provincial population and that two-thirds majority of all those eligible to vote accepted the draft Statute. The referendum was the first after the introduction of women's suffrage.

The referendum resulted in 97% of valid votes in support of the draft Statute on a turnout of 94%, representing 84% of the electorate. The percentage of registered voters voting yes were 46% in the province of Álava (due to boycott from carlists), 90% in the province of Gipuzkoa and 88% in the province of Biscay. In large municipalities (with more than 10,000 registered voters) the approval rate was 92%, in municipalities with 5–10,000 voters 84%, in municipalities with 3–5,000 voters 84%, in municipalities with 1–3,000 voters 86% and in the smallest municipalities (with fewer than 1,000 registered voters) 74%.

The 1931 Spanish constitution was not clear on whether the two-thirds approval requirement was applicable to each province or to the total vote figures. As the draft was approved by less than two-thirds of registered voters in Álava, this produced a stalemate. In December 1933 the Basque Nationalist Party recommended to proceed on basis of the total vote figure being over the two-thirds threshold. However, in the same month, the majority of Alavese councils asked the Spanish Cortes to exclude the province from further works.

The draft Statute was subsequently submitted to the consideration of the Cortes, which initially rejected it on 28 January 1934 by a 125–136 margin as a consequence of popular support not reaching the required two-thirds majority in Álava. However, after the Popular Front's victory in the 1936 general elections, the statute was approved on 1 October 1936, though its application would be severely limited as a result of the outbreak of the Spanish Civil War.

== Results ==
Do you approve of the draft Statute of Autonomy of the Basque Country?
Choice	Votes	%
For	411,756	96.67
Against	14,196	3.33
Total	425,952	100.00
Valid votes	425,952	92.75
Invalid/blank votes	33,273	7.25
Total votes	459,225	100.00
Registered voters/turnout	490,157	93.69
Source: Direct Democracy

== See also ==
- 1931 Catalan Statute of Autonomy referendum
- 1936 Galician Statute of Autonomy referendum
- Statute of Autonomy of the Basque Country of 1936
