= Córdoba (Parliament of Andalusia constituency) =

Coordinates: 38°00′N 4°50′W

- Parliament of Andalusia; Electoral constituency
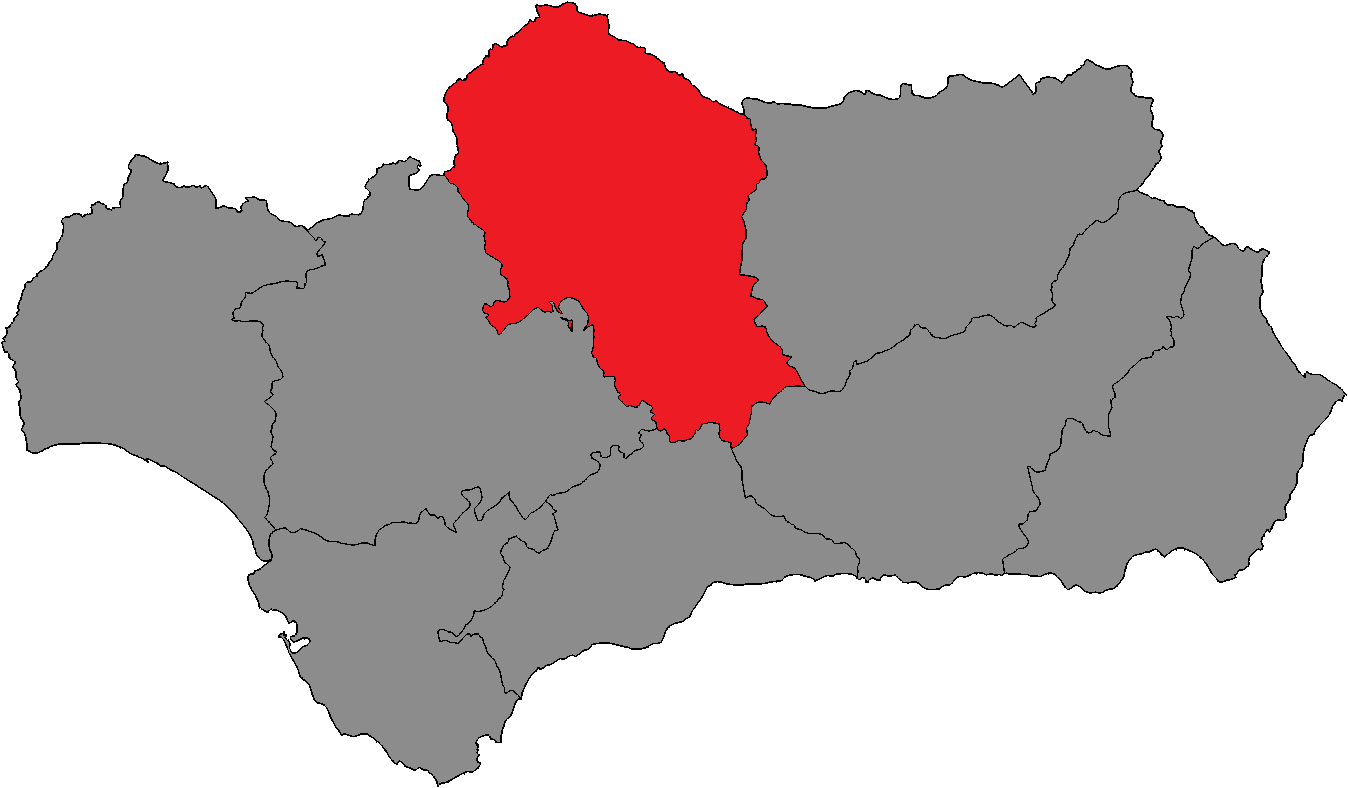
- Location of Córdoba within Andalusia
- Province: Córdoba
- Autonomous community: Andalusia
- Population: ▲772,153 (2025)
- Electorate: ▲647,576 (2026)
- Major settlements: Córdoba

Current constituency
- Created: 1982
- Seats: 13 (1982–2008); 12 (2008–present)
- Members: PP (6); PSOE–A (3); Vox (1); PorA (1); AA (1)

Córdoba is one of the eight constituencies (Spanish: circunscripciones) represented in the Parliament of Andalusia, the regional legislature of the Autonomous Community of Andalusia. The constituency currently elects 12 deputies. Its boundaries correspond to those of the Spanish province of Córdoba. The electoral system uses the D'Hondt method and closed-list proportional representation, with a minimum threshold of three percent.

== Electoral system ==
The constituency was established under the Statute of Autonomy for Andalusia of 1981 and was first contested in the 1982 regional election. The Statute (reformed in 2007) provides for the eight provinces in Andalusia—Almería, Cádiz, Córdoba, Granada, Huelva, Jaén, Málaga and Seville—to be set as multi-member constituencies in the Parliament of Andalusia, each of which is assigned an initial minimum of eight seats and the remaining ones are distributed in proportion to population (with the number of seats in each province not exceeding two times that of any other). The exception was the 1982 election, when each constituency was allocated a fixed number of seats. Seats are elected using the D'Hondt method and closed-list proportional voting, with a three percent-threshold of valid votes (including blank ballots) in each constituency. The use of this electoral method may result in a higher effective threshold depending on district magnitude and vote distribution. The law does not provide for by-elections to fill vacant seats; instead, any vacancies arising after the proclamation of candidates and during the legislative term are filled by the next candidates on the party lists or, when required, by designated substitutes.

Voting is based on universal suffrage, comprising all Spanish nationals over 18 years of age, registered in the constituency and with full political rights. Amendments in 2011 required non-resident citizens to apply for voting, a system known as "begged" voting (Spanish: Voto rogado), which was abolished in 2022 and attributed responsibility for a major decrease in the turnout of Spaniards abroad during the years it was in force. Additionally, those legally incapacitated were also barred from voting before amendments in 2018 granted them the right to vote.

The electoral law allows for parties and federations registered in the interior ministry, alliances and groupings of electors to present lists of candidates. Parties and federations intending to form an alliance are required to inform the relevant electoral commission within 10 days of the election call—15 before 1985—whereas groupings of electors need to secure the signature of at least one percent of the electorate in the constituencies for which they seek election (before 1985 this was one permille, with a compulsory minimum of 500 signatures), disallowing electors from signing for more than one list. Amendments in 2005 required a balanced composition of men and women in the electoral lists through the use of a zipper system.

== Deputies ==
Deputies 1982–present
Key to parties PCA–PCE IU–CA IULV–CA Adelante AA PorA Podemos PA PSOE–A Cs UCD PP CP AP Vox
Parliament	Election	Distribution
1st	1982	2 / 7 / 2 / 2
2nd	1986	5 / 5 / 3
3rd	1990	2 / 1 / 7 / 3
4th	1994	3 / 6 / 4
5th	1996	3 / 6 / 4
6th	2000	1 / 1 / 6 / 5
7th	2004	1 / 1 / 7 / 4
8th	2008	1 / 6 / 5
9th	2012	2 / 5 / 5
10th	2015	1 / 1 / 5 / 1 / 4
11th	2018	2 / 4 / 2 / 3 / 1
12th	2022	1 / 3 / 7 / 1
13th	2026	1 / 1 / 3 / 6 / 1

== Regional elections ==
=== 2026 ===
Summary of the 17 May 2026 Parliament of Andalusia election results in Córdoba
Parties and alliances	Popular vote			Seats	
Parties and alliances	Votes	%	±pp	Total	+/−
People's Party (PP)	184,803	43.22	−1.44	6	−1
Spanish Socialist Workers' Party of Andalusia (PSOE–A)	95,241	22.27	−1.25	3	±0
Vox (Vox)	53,997	12.63	+0.18	1	±0
For Andalusia (IU–Podemos–MS–IdPA–VQ–ALTER–AV)	37,636	8.80	−1.18	1	±0
Forward Andalusia (Adelante Andalucía)	35,682	8.34	+4.86	1	+1
The Party is Over (SALF)	8,794	2.06	New	0	±0
Animalist Party with the Environment (PACMA)^{1}	2,138	0.50	−0.23	0	±0
Andalusians–Andalusian People–Andalusia Between All (Andalucistas–PA)^{2}	1,223	0.29	+0.13	0	±0
Blank Seats to Leave Empty Seats (EB)	1,028	0.24	+0.09	0	±0
Communist Party of the Andalusian People (PCPA)	811	0.19	±0.00	0	±0
Communist Party of the Workers of Spain (PCTE)	564	0.13	+0.01	0	±0
Spanish Phalanx of the CNSO (FE de las JONS)	533	0.12	+0.08	0	±0
For a Fairer World (M+J)	408	0.10	+0.01	0	±0
Andalusian Nation (NA)	285	0.07	±0.00	0	±0
Blank ballots	4,489	1.05	−0.07		
Total	427,632			12	±0
Valid votes	427,632	98.66	−0.01		
Invalid votes	5,798	1.34	+0.01		
Votes cast / turnout	433,430	66.93	+6.14		
Abstentions	214,144	33.07	−6.14		
Registered voters	647,574				
Sources
Footnotes: ^{1} Animalist Party with the Environment results are compared to Animalist Party Against Mistreatment of Animals totals in the 2022 election.; ^{2} Andalusians–Andalusian People–Andalusia Between All results are compared to Arise Andalusians Coalition in the 2022 election.

=== 2022 ===
Summary of the 19 June 2022 Parliament of Andalusia election results in Córdoba
Parties and alliances	Popular vote			Seats	
Parties and alliances	Votes	%	±pp	Total	+/−
People's Party (PP)	172,980	44.66	+22.74	7	+4
Spanish Socialist Workers' Party of Andalusia (PSOE–A)	91,096	23.52	–5.71	3	–1
Vox (Vox)	48,208	12.45	+3.26	1	±0
United Left–More Country–Greens Equo–Initiative: For Andalusia (PorA)^{1}	38,639	9.98	n/a	1	±0
Forward Andalusia–Andalusians (Adelante Andalucía–Andalucistas)^{1}	13,488	3.48	n/a	0	–1
Citizens–Party of the Citizenry (Cs)	12,220	3.15	–14.50	0	–2
Animalist Party Against Mistreatment of Animals (PACMA)	2,845	0.73	–0.81	0	±0
Communist Party of the Andalusian People (PCPA)	732	0.19	–0.04	0	±0
Arise Andalusians Coalition (AL)^{2}	603	0.16	–0.26	0	±0
Blank Seats (EB)	600	0.15	–0.15	0	±0
Communist Party of the Workers of Spain (PCTE)	472	0.12	New	0	±0
For a Fairer World (PUM+J)	363	0.09	New	0	±0
Zero Cuts (Recortes Cero)	335	0.09	–0.07	0	±0
Andalusian Nation (NA)	256	0.07	New	0	±0
Spanish Phalanx of the CNSO (FE de las JONS)	157	0.04	–0.05	0	±0
Blank ballots	4,340	1.12	–0.56		
Total	387,334			12	±0
Valid votes	387,334	98.67	+1.06		
Invalid votes	5,237	1.33	–1.06		
Votes cast / turnout	392,571	60.79	+0.26		
Abstentions	253,181	39.21	–0.26		
Registered voters	645,752				
Sources
Footnotes: ^{1} Within the Forward–We Can–United Left–Spring–Andalusian Left alliance in the 2018 election.; ^{2} Arise Andalusians Coalition results are compared to Andalusia by Herself totals in the 2018 election.

=== 2018 ===
Summary of the 2 December 2018 Parliament of Andalusia election results in Córdoba
Parties and alliances	Popular vote			Seats	
Parties and alliances	Votes	%	±pp	Total	+/−
Spanish Socialist Workers' Party of Andalusia (PSOE–A)	111,826	29.23	–6.69	4	–1
People's Party (PP)	83,838	21.92	–5.42	3	–1
Citizens–Party of the Citizenry (Cs)	67,508	17.65	+9.96	2	+1
Forward–We Can–United Left–Spring–Andalusian Left (Adelante Andalucía)^{1}	64,279	16.80	–5.81	2	±0
Vox (Vox)	35,147	9.19	+8.86	1	+1
Animalist Party Against Mistreatment of Animals (PACMA)	5,899	1.54	+0.90	0	±0
Andalusia by Herself (AxSí)^{2}	1,606	0.42	–1.05	0	±0
Equo Greens–Andalusia Initiative (Equo–Iniciativa)	1,467	0.38	New	0	±0
Blank Seats (EB)	1,144	0.30	+0.03	0	±0
Spanish Communist Workers' Party (PCOE)	978	0.26	New	0	±0
Communist Party of the Andalusian People (PCPA)	886	0.23	+0.10	0	±0
Zero Cuts–For a Fairer World–Green Group (Recortes Cero–M+J–GV)^{3}	621	0.16	–0.04	0	±0
Union, Progress and Democracy (UPyD)	600	0.16	–1.39	0	±0
Spanish Phalanx of the CNSO (FE de las JONS)	335	0.09	–0.03	0	±0
Blank ballots	6,408	1.68	+0.04		
Total	382,542			12	±0
Valid votes	382,542	97.61	–1.18		
Invalid votes	9,377	2.39	+1.18		
Votes cast / turnout	391,919	60.53	–5.08		
Abstentions	255,508	39.47	+5.08		
Registered voters	647,427				
Sources
Footnotes: ^{1} Forward–We Can–United Left–Spring–Andalusian Left results are compared to the combined totals of We Can and United Left/The Greens–Assembly for Andalusia in the 2015 election.; ^{2} Andalusia by Herself results are compared to Andalusian Party totals in the 2015 election.; ^{3} Zero Cuts–For a Fairer World–Green Group results are compared to the combined totals of For a Fairer World and Zero Cuts in the 2015 election.

=== 2015 ===
Summary of the 22 March 2015 Parliament of Andalusia election results in Córdoba
Parties and alliances	Popular vote			Seats	
Parties and alliances	Votes	%	±pp	Total	+/−
Spanish Socialist Workers' Party of Andalusia (PSOE–A)	152,263	35.92	–3.01	5	±0
People's Party (PP)	115,900	27.34	–12.35	4	–1
We Can (Podemos)	53,430	12.61	New	1	+1
United Left/The Greens–Assembly for Andalusia (IULV–CA)	42,387	10.00	–3.33	1	–1
Citizens–Party of the Citizenry (C's)	32,611	7.69	New	1	+1
Union, Progress and Democracy (UPyD)	6,556	1.55	–1.11	0	±0
Andalusian Party (PA)	6,216	1.47	–1.40	0	±0
Animalist Party Against Mistreatment of Animals (PACMA)	2,721	0.64	+0.47	0	±0
Vox (Vox)	1,391	0.33	New	0	±0
Blank Seats (EB)	1,155	0.27	+0.09	0	±0
Communist Party of the Peoples of Spain (PCPE)	540	0.13	–0.06	0	±0
Spanish Phalanx of the CNSO (FE de las JONS)	511	0.12	New	0	±0
For a Fairer World (PUM+J)	456	0.11	+0.04	0	±0
Labour and Justice Party (PTJ)	389	0.09	New	0	±0
Zero Cuts (Recortes Cero)	383	0.09	New	0	±0
Blank ballots	6,946	1.64	+0.65		
Total	423,855			12	±0
Valid votes	423,855	98.79	–0.61		
Invalid votes	5,209	1.21	+0.61		
Votes cast / turnout	429,064	65.61	–0.89		
Abstentions	224,862	34.39	+0.89		
Registered voters	653,926				

=== 2012 ===
Summary of the 25 March 2012 Parliament of Andalusia election results in Córdoba
Parties and alliances	Popular vote			Seats	
Parties and alliances	Votes	%	±pp	Total	+/−
People's Party (PP)	167,899	39.69	+1.77	5	±0
Spanish Socialist Workers' Party of Andalusia (PSOE–A)	164,670	38.93	–7.71	5	–1
United Left/The Greens–Assembly for Andalusia (IULV–CA)	56,404	13.33	+3.88	2	+1
Andalusian Party (PA)^{1}	12,135	2.87	–0.28	0	±0
Union, Progress and Democracy (UPyD)	11,253	2.66	+2.30	0	±0
Equo (Equo)	2,256	0.53	New	0	±0
Communist Party of the Peoples of Spain (PCPE)	812	0.19	+0.03	0	±0
Blank Seats (EB)	770	0.18	New	0	±0
Animalist Party Against Mistreatment of Animals (PACMA)	711	0.17	New	0	±0
Hartos.org (Hartos.org)	542	0.13	New	0	±0
We Won't Pay this Crisis (ECNP)	312	0.07	New	0	±0
For a Fairer World (PUM+J)	307	0.07	New	0	±0
Andalusian Social Democratic Party (PSDA)	172	0.04	New	0	±0
Spanish Alternative (AES)	155	0.04	New	0	±0
Internationalist Solidarity and Self-Management (SAIn)	127	0.03	–0.06	0	±0
Citizens of Democratic Centre (CCD)	106	0.03	New	0	±0
Liberal Democratic Centre (CDL)	88	0.02	New	0	±0
Communist Unification of Spain (UCE)	86	0.02	New	0	±0
Blank ballots	4,180	0.99	–0.23		
Total	422,985			12	±0
Valid votes	422,985	99.40	+0.07		
Invalid votes	2,551	0.60	–0.07		
Votes cast / turnout	425,536	66.50	–9.12		
Abstentions	214,328	33.50	+9.12		
Registered voters	639,864				
Sources
Footnotes: ^{1} Andalusian Party results are compared to Andalusian Coalition totals in the 2008 election.

=== 2008 ===
Summary of the 9 March 2008 Parliament of Andalusia election results in Córdoba
Parties and alliances	Popular vote			Seats	
Parties and alliances	Votes	%	±pp	Total	+/−
Spanish Socialist Workers' Party of Andalusia (PSOE–A)	225,394	46.64	+0.76	6	–1
People's Party (PP)	183,250	37.92	+7.12	5	+1
United Left/The Greens–Assembly for Andalusia (IULV–CA)	45,688	9.45	–1.80	1	±0
Andalusian Coalition (CA)^{1}	15,207	3.15	–6.95	0	–1
The Greens (LV)	2,188	0.45	New	0	±0
Union, Progress and Democracy (UPyD)	1,742	0.36	New	0	±0
Communist Party of the Andalusian People (PCPA)	775	0.16	New	0	±0
Republican Left (IR)	737	0.15	New	0	±0
Andalusian Convergence (CAnda)	638	0.13	New	0	±0
Citizens–Party of the Citizenry (C's)	552	0.11	New	0	±0
Internationalist Solidarity and Self-Management (SAIn)	454	0.09	New	0	±0
Humanist Party (PH)	390	0.08	–0.03	0	±0
Spanish Phalanx of the CNSO (FE de las JONS)	361	0.07	–0.12	0	±0
Blank ballots	5,886	1.22	–0.13		
Total	483,262			12	–1
Valid votes	483,262	99.33	+0.02		
Invalid votes	3,236	0.67	–0.02		
Votes cast / turnout	486,498	75.62	–2.80		
Abstentions	156,837	24.38	+2.80		
Registered voters	643,335				
Sources
Footnotes: ^{1} Andalusian Coalition results are compared to the combined totals of Andalusian Party, Andalusian Forum and Socialist Party of Andalusia in the 2004 election.

=== 2004 ===
Summary of the 14 March 2004 Parliament of Andalusia election results in Córdoba
Parties and alliances	Popular vote			Seats	
Parties and alliances	Votes	%	±pp	Total	+/−
Spanish Socialist Workers' Party of Andalusia (PSOE–A)	226,246	45.88	+5.22	7	+1
People's Party (PP)	151,857	30.80	–7.55	4	–1
United Left/The Greens–Assembly for Andalusia (IULV–CA)	55,474	11.25	–1.03	1	±0
Andalusian Party (PA)	31,619	6.41	–0.49	1	±0
Andalusian Forum (FA)	16,051	3.26	New	0	±0
Socialist Party of Andalusia (PSA)	2,105	0.43	New	0	±0
Spanish Phalanx of the CNSO (FE de las JONS)^{1}	931	0.19	+0.14	0	±0
Andalusia Assembly (A)	550	0.11	–0.02	0	±0
Humanist Party (PH)	546	0.11	+0.02	0	±0
New Andalusian Green Left (NIVA)	533	0.11	New	0	±0
Another Democracy is Possible (ODeP)	525	0.11	New	0	±0
Blank ballots	6,677	1.35	+0.15		
Total	493,114			13	±0
Valid votes	493,114	99.31	–0.01		
Invalid votes	3,405	0.69	+0.01		
Votes cast / turnout	496,519	78.42	+3.73		
Abstentions	136,620	21.58	–3.73		
Registered voters	633,139				
Sources
Footnotes: ^{1} Spanish Phalanx of the CNSO results are compared to Independent Spanish Phalanx totals in the 2000 election.

=== 2000 ===
Summary of the 12 March 2000 Parliament of Andalusia election results in Córdoba
Parties and alliances	Popular vote			Seats	
Parties and alliances	Votes	%	±pp	Total	+/−
Spanish Socialist Workers' Party of Andalusia (PSOE–A)	187,591	40.66	–1.09	6	±0
People's Party (PP)	176,931	38.35	+6.70	5	+1
United Left/The Greens–Assembly for Andalusia (IULV–CA)	56,661	12.28	–7.47	1	–2
Andalusian Party (PA)	31,830	6.90	+1.19	1	+1
Andalusian Left (IA)	900	0.20	New	0	±0
Andalusia Assembly (A)	620	0.13	New	0	±0
Andalusian Nation (NA)	485	0.11	–0.05	0	±0
Humanist Party (PH)	416	0.09	+0.01	0	±0
The Phalanx (FE)	250	0.05	New	0	±0
Independent Spanish Phalanx (FEI)	216	0.05	New	0	±0
Blank ballots	5,515	1.20	+0.53		
Total	461,415			13	±0
Valid votes	461,415	99.32	–0.04		
Invalid votes	3,152	0.68	+0.04		
Votes cast / turnout	464,567	74.69	–7.60		
Abstentions	157,446	25.31	+7.60		
Registered voters	622,013				

=== 1996 ===
Summary of the 3 March 1996 Parliament of Andalusia election results in Córdoba
Parties and alliances	Popular vote			Seats	
Parties and alliances	Votes	%	±pp	Total	+/−
Spanish Socialist Workers' Party of Andalusia (PSOE–A)	206,136	41.75	+4.27	6	±0
People's Party (PP)	156,275	31.65	+0.86	4	±0
United Left/The Greens–Assembly for Andalusia (IULV–CA)	97,509	19.75	–4.86	3	±0
Andalusian Party (PA)^{1}	28,179	5.71	+0.46	0	±0
Communist Party of the Andalusian People (PCPA)	1,095	0.22	–0.17	0	±0
Andalusian Nation (NA)	582	0.12	–0.12	0	±0
Humanist Party (PH)	368	0.07	–0.05	0	±0
Authentic Spanish Phalanx (FEA)	348	0.07	New	0	±0
Blank ballots	3,302	0.67	–0.09		
Total	493,794			13	±0
Valid votes	493,794	99.36	–0.02		
Invalid votes	3,157	0.64	+0.02		
Votes cast / turnout	496,951	82.29	+9.34		
Abstentions	106,956	17.71	–9.34		
Registered voters	603,907				
Sources
Footnotes: ^{1} Andalusian Party results are compared to Andalusian Coalition–Andalusian Power totals in the 1994 election.

=== 1994 ===
Summary of the 12 June 1994 Parliament of Andalusia election results in Córdoba
Parties and alliances	Popular vote			Seats	
Parties and alliances	Votes	%	±pp	Total	+/−
Spanish Socialist Workers' Party of Andalusia (PSOE–A)	159,830	37.48	–9.78	6	–1
People's Party (PP)	131,312	30.79	+10.05	4	+1
United Left/The Greens–Assembly for Andalusia (IULV–CA)	104,938	24.61	+5.80	3	+1
Andalusian Coalition–Andalusian Power (PA–PAP)^{1}	22,391	5.25	–4.00	0	–1
Communist Party of the Andalusian People (PCPA)	1,668	0.39	+0.14	0	±0
Forum–Democratic and Social Centre (Foro–CDS)	1,166	0.27	–1.03	0	±0
Andalusian Nation (NA)^{2}	1,017	0.24	+0.19	0	±0
Humanist Party (PH)	491	0.12	+0.06	0	±0
Spanish Phalanx of the CNSO (FE–JONS)	374	0.09	New	0	±0
Blank ballots	3,262	0.76	+0.35		
Total	426,449			13	±0
Valid votes	426,449	99.38	–0.24		
Invalid votes	2,672	0.62	+0.24		
Votes cast / turnout	429,121	72.95	+10.57		
Abstentions	159,157	27.05	–10.57		
Registered voters	588,278				
Sources
Footnotes: ^{1} Andalusian Coalition–Andalusian Power results are compared to Andalusian Party totals in the 1990 election.; ^{2} Andalusian Nation results are compared to Andalusian Front of Liberation totals in the 1990 election.

=== 1990 ===
Summary of the 23 June 1990 Parliament of Andalusia election results in Córdoba
Parties and alliances	Popular vote			Seats	
Parties and alliances	Votes	%	±pp	Total	+/−
Spanish Socialist Workers' Party of Andalusia (PSOE–A)	166,223	47.26	+11.68	7	+2
People's Party (PP)^{1}	72,959	20.74	–0.32	3	±0
United Left–Assembly for Andalusia (IU–CA)	66,165	18.81	–14.03	2	–3
Andalusian Party (PA)	32,551	9.25	+4.94	1	+1
Democratic and Social Centre (CDS)	4,579	1.30	–1.98	0	±0
Workers' Party of Spain–Communist Unity (PTE–UC)^{2}	1,642	0.47	–0.51	0	±0
The Ecologist Greens (LVE)	1,215	0.35	New	0	±0
Greens of Andalusia (VA)	1,047	0.30	New	0	±0
Socialist Democracy (DS)	1,038	0.30	New	0	±0
Ruiz-Mateos Group (ARM)	931	0.26	New	0	±0
Communist Party of the Andalusian People (PCPA)	878	0.25	New	0	±0
Alliance for the Republic (AxR)	240	0.07	New	0	±0
Andalusian Centrist Unity (UCA)	230	0.07	New	0	±0
Humanist Party (PH)	210	0.06	–0.06	0	±0
Falangist Movement of Spain (MFE)	191	0.05	New	0	±0
Andalusian Front of Liberation (FAL)	173	0.05	New	0	±0
Blank ballots	1,442	0.41	+0.10		
Total	351,714			13	±0
Valid votes	351,714	99.62	+0.87		
Invalid votes	1,329	0.38	–0.87		
Votes cast / turnout	353,043	62.38	–14.04		
Abstentions	212,874	37.62	+14.04		
Registered voters	565,917				
Sources
Footnotes: ^{1} People's Party results are compared to People's Coalition totals in the 1986 election.; ^{2} Workers' Party of Spain–Communist Unity results are compared to Communists' Unity Board totals in the 1986 election.

=== 1986 ===
Summary of the 22 June 1986 Parliament of Andalusia election results in Córdoba
Parties and alliances	Popular vote			Seats	
Parties and alliances	Votes	%	±pp	Total	+/−
Spanish Socialist Workers' Party of Andalusia (PSOE–A)	148,663	35.58	–13.37	5	–2
United Left–Assembly for Andalusia (IU–CA)^{1}	137,214	32.84	+20.44	5	+3
People's Coalition (AP–PDP–PL)^{2}	88,002	21.06	+3.79	3	+1
Andalusian Party (PA)	17,995	4.31	–0.60	0	±0
Democratic and Social Centre (CDS)	13,718	3.28	New	0	±0
Democratic Reformist Party (PRD)	4,605	1.10	New	0	±0
Communists' Unity Board (MUC)	4,098	0.98	New	0	±0
Socialist Party of the Andalusian People (PSPA)	1,358	0.33	New	0	±0
Humanist Party (PH)	510	0.12	New	0	±0
Andalusian Liberation (LA)	352	0.08	New	0	±0
Union of the Democratic Centre (UCD)	n/a	n/a	–13.00	0	–2
Blank ballots	1,303	0.31	+0.03		
Total	417,818			13	±0
Valid votes	417,818	98.75	–0.67		
Invalid votes	5,297	1.25	+0.67		
Votes cast / turnout	423,115	76.42	+2.24		
Abstentions	130,577	23.58	–2.24		
Registered voters	553,692				
Sources
Footnotes: ^{1} United Left–Assembly for Andalusia results are compared to Communist Party of Andalusia totals in the 1982 election.; ^{2} People's Coalition results are compared to People's Alliance–People's Democratic Party totals in the 1982 election.

=== 1982 ===
Summary of the 23 May 1982 Parliament of Andalusia election results in Córdoba
Parties and alliances	Popular vote			Seats	
Parties and alliances	Votes	%	±pp	Total	+/−
Spanish Socialist Workers' Party of Andalusia (PSOE–A)	182,975	48.95	n/a	7	n/a
People's Alliance (AP)	64,540	17.27	n/a	2	n/a
Union of the Democratic Centre (UCD)	48,579	13.00	n/a	2	n/a
Communist Party of Andalusia (PCA–PCE)	46,368	12.40	n/a	2	n/a
Socialist Party of Andalusia–Andalusian Party (PSA–PA)	18,367	4.91	n/a	0	n/a
Workers' Socialist Party (PST)	4,599	1.23	n/a	0	n/a
New Force (FN)	3,990	1.07	n/a	0	n/a
Communist Unification of Spain (UCE)	1,114	0.30	n/a	0	n/a
Communist Movement of Andalusia (MCA)	805	0.22	n/a	0	n/a
Communist Party of Spain (Marxist–Leninist) (PCE (m–l))	730	0.20	n/a	0	n/a
Spanish Phalanx of the CNSO (FE–JONS)	690	0.18	n/a	0	n/a
Blank ballots	1,032	0.28	n/a		
Total	373,789			13	n/a
Valid votes	373,789	99.42	n/a		
Invalid votes	2,194	0.58	n/a		
Votes cast / turnout	375,983	74.18	n/a		
Abstentions	130,892	25.82	n/a		
Registered voters	506,875				

== Bibliography ==
- Real Decreto-ley 20/1977, de 18 de marzo, sobre Normas Electorales (Royal Decree-Law 20/1977). Official State Gazette (in Spanish). 18 March 1977. BOE-A-1977-7445.
- Ley Orgánica 6/1981, de 30 de diciembre, de Estatuto de Autonomía para Andalucía (Organic Law 6/1981). Official State Gazette (in Spanish). 30 December 1981. BOE-A-1982-633.
- Decreto 18/1982, de ocho de Marzo, por el que se convocan Elecciones al Parlamento de Andalucía (PDF) (Decree 18/1982). Official Gazette of the Regional Government of Andalusia (in Spanish). 8 March 1982.
- Ley Orgánica 5/1985, de 19 de junio, del Régimen Electoral General (Organic Law 5/1985). Official State Gazette (in Spanish). 19 June 1985. BOE-A-1985-11672.
- Ley 1/1986, de 2 de enero, Electoral de Andalucía (Law 1/1986). Official State Gazette (in Spanish). 2 January 1986. BOE-A-1986-2788.
- Ley Orgánica 2/2007, de 19 de marzo, de reforma del Estatuto de Autonomía para Andalucía (Organic Law 2/2007). Official State Gazette (in Spanish). 19 March 2007. BOE-A-2007-5825.
