= Huelva (Parliament of Andalusia constituency) =

Coordinates: 37°40′N 7°00′W

- Parliament of Andalusia; Electoral constituency
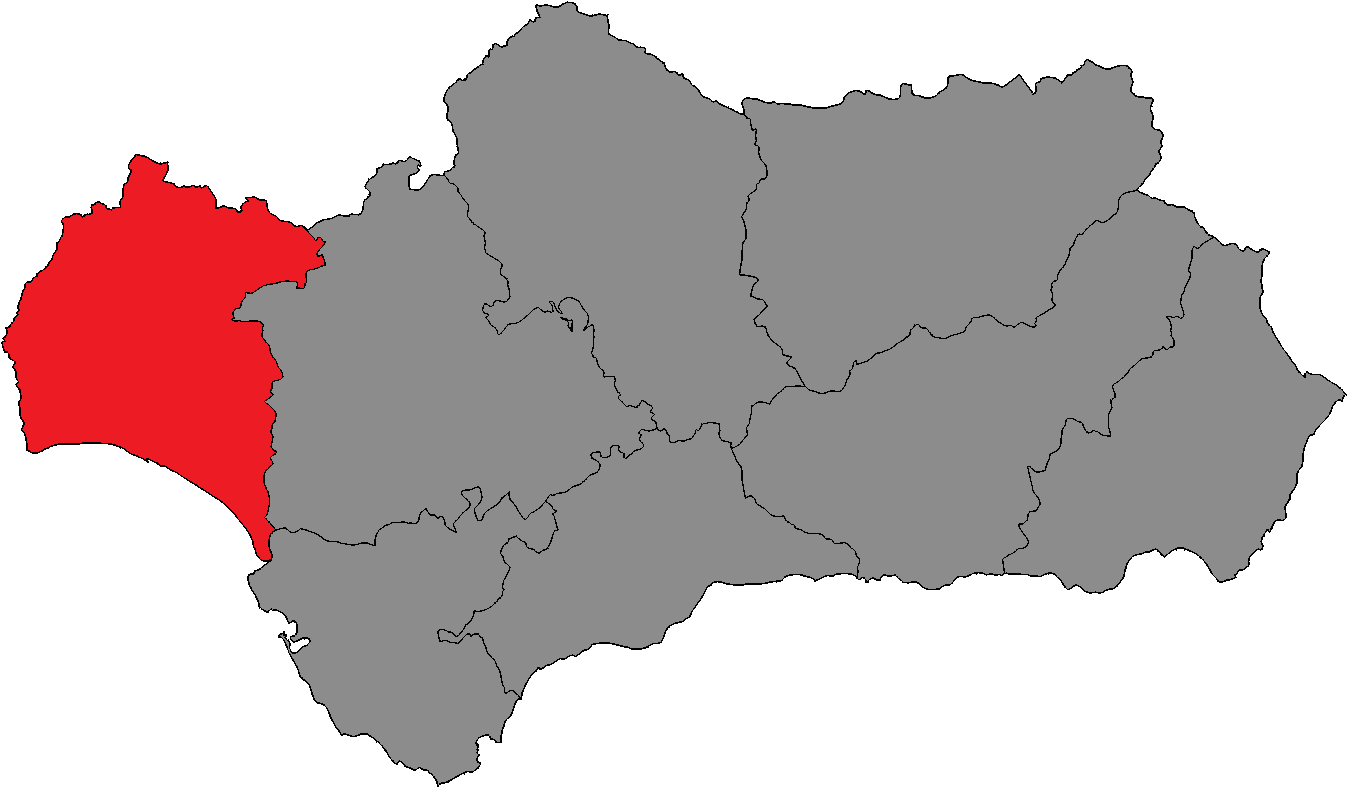
- Location of Huelva within Andalusia
- Province: Huelva
- Autonomous community: Andalusia
- Population: ▲535,703 (2025)
- Electorate: ▲407,900 (2026)
- Major settlements: Huelva

Current constituency
- Created: 1982
- Seats: 11
- Members: PP (5); PSOE–A (3); Vox (2); AA (1)

Huelva is one of the eight constituencies (Spanish: circunscripciones) represented in the Parliament of Andalusia, the regional legislature of the Autonomous Community of Andalusia. The constituency currently elects 11 deputies. Its boundaries correspond to those of the Spanish province of Huelva. The electoral system uses the D'Hondt method and closed-list proportional representation, with a minimum threshold of three percent.

== Electoral system ==
The constituency was established under the Statute of Autonomy for Andalusia of 1981 and was first contested in the 1982 regional election. The Statute (reformed in 2007) provides for the eight provinces in Andalusia—Almería, Cádiz, Córdoba, Granada, Huelva, Jaén, Málaga and Seville—to be set as multi-member constituencies in the Parliament of Andalusia, each of which is assigned an initial minimum of eight seats and the remaining ones are distributed in proportion to population (with the number of seats in each province not exceeding two times that of any other). The exception was the 1982 election, when each constituency was allocated a fixed number of seats. Seats are elected using the D'Hondt method and closed-list proportional voting, with a three percent-threshold of valid votes (including blank ballots) in each constituency. The use of this electoral method may result in a higher effective threshold depending on district magnitude and vote distribution. The law does not provide for by-elections to fill vacant seats; instead, any vacancies arising after the proclamation of candidates and during the legislative term are filled by the next candidates on the party lists or, when required, by designated substitutes.

Voting is based on universal suffrage, comprising all Spanish nationals over 18 years of age, registered in the constituency and with full political rights. Amendments in 2011 required non-resident citizens to apply for voting, a system known as "begged" voting (Spanish: Voto rogado), which was abolished in 2022 and attributed responsibility for a major decrease in the turnout of Spaniards abroad during the years it was in force. Additionally, those legally incapacitated were also barred from voting before amendments in 2018 granted them the right to vote.

The electoral law allows for parties and federations registered in the interior ministry, alliances and groupings of electors to present lists of candidates. Parties and federations intending to form an alliance are required to inform the relevant electoral commission within 10 days of the election call—15 before 1985—whereas groupings of electors need to secure the signature of at least one percent of the electorate in the constituencies for which they seek election (before 1985 this was one permille, with a compulsory minimum of 500 signatures), disallowing electors from signing for more than one list. Amendments in 2005 required a balanced composition of men and women in the electoral lists through the use of a zipper system.

== Deputies ==
Deputies 1982–present
Key to parties IU–CA IULV–CA Adelante AA Podemos PA PSOE–A Cs UCD PP CP AP Vox
Parliament	Election	Distribution
1st	1982	8 / 2 / 1
2nd	1986	1 / 7 / 3
3rd	1990	1 / 1 / 7 / 2
4th	1994	2 / 5 / 4
5th	1996	1 / 6 / 4
6th	2000	6 / 5
7th	2004	1 / 7 / 3
8th	2008	1 / 6 / 4
9th	2012	1 / 5 / 5
10th	2015	1 / 6 / 1 / 3
11th	2018	1 / 4 / 2 / 3 / 1
12th	2022	4 / 6 / 1
13th	2026	1 / 3 / 5 / 2

== Regional elections ==
=== 2026 ===
Summary of the 17 May 2026 Parliament of Andalusia election results in Huelva
Parties and alliances	Popular vote			Seats	
Parties and alliances	Votes	%	±pp	Total	+/−
People's Party (PP)	100,140	40.81	−1.89	5	−1
Spanish Socialist Workers' Party of Andalusia (PSOE–A)	61,795	25.18	−2.22	3	−1
Vox (Vox)	36,466	14.86	+2.09	2	+1
Forward Andalusia (Adelante Andalucía)	19,669	8.02	+4.07	1	+1
For Andalusia (IU–Podemos–MS–IdPA–VQ–ALTER–AV)	13,690	5.58	−0.96	0	±0
The Party is Over (SALF)	5,370	2.19	New	0	±0
Huelva Exists (HE>)	2,148	0.88	New	0	±0
Animalist Party with the Environment (PACMA)^{1}	1,226	0.50	−0.31	0	±0
Andalusians–Andalusian People (Andalucistas–PA)^{2}	838	0.34	+0.11	0	±0
Blank Seats to Leave Empty Seats (EB)	468	0.19	New	0	±0
Communist Party of the Andalusian People (PCPA)	289	0.12	New	0	±0
Spanish Phalanx of the CNSO (FE de las JONS)	252	0.10	+0.07	0	±0
For a Fairer World (M+J)	216	0.09	±0.00	0	±0
Andalusian Nation (NA)	186	0.08	−0.02	0	±0
Revolutionary Anticapitalist Left (IZAR)	136	0.06	New	0	±0
Blank ballots	2,482	1.01	−0.07		
Total	245,371			11	±0
Valid votes	245,371	98.60	−0.04		
Invalid votes	3,473	1.40	+0.04		
Votes cast / turnout	248,844	61.01	+7.15		
Abstentions	159,063	38.99	−7.15		
Registered voters	407,907				
Sources
Footnotes: ^{1} Animalist Party with the Environment results are compared to Animalist Party Against Mistreatment of Animals totals in the 2022 election.; ^{2} Andalusians–Andalusian People results are compared to Arise Andalusians Coalition in the 2022 election.

=== 2022 ===
Summary of the 19 June 2022 Parliament of Andalusia election results in Huelva
Parties and alliances	Popular vote			Seats	
Parties and alliances	Votes	%	±pp	Total	+/−
People's Party (PP)	91,169	42.70	+20.05	6	+3
Spanish Socialist Workers' Party of Andalusia (PSOE–A)	58,498	27.40	–4.17	4	±0
Vox (Vox)	27,270	12.77	+4.43	1	±0
United Left–More Country–Greens Equo–Initiative: For Andalusia (PorA)^{1}	13,973	6.54	n/a	0	±0
Forward Andalusia–Andalusians (Adelante Andalucía–Andalucistas)^{1}	8,436	3.95	n/a	0	–1
Citizens–Party of the Citizenry (Cs)	5,766	2.70	–13.56	0	–2
For Huelva (XH)	3,197	1.50	New	0	±0
Animalist Party Against Mistreatment of Animals (PACMA)	1,722	0.81	–0.71	0	±0
Arise Andalusians Coalition (AL)^{2}	498	0.23	–0.43	0	±0
Andalusian Nation (NA)	216	0.10	–0.08	0	±0
Zero Cuts (Recortes Cero)	214	0.10	–0.10	0	±0
For a Fairer World (PUM+J)	197	0.09	New	0	±0
Spanish Phalanx of the CNSO (FE de las JONS)	68	0.03	–0.05	0	±0
Blank ballots	2,308	1.08	–0.63		
Total	213,532			11	±0
Valid votes	213,532	98.64	+1.02		
Invalid votes	2,951	1.36	–1.02		
Votes cast / turnout	216,483	53.86	–0.72		
Abstentions	185,420	46.14	+0.72		
Registered voters	401,903				
Sources
Footnotes: ^{1} Within the Forward–We Can–United Left–Spring–Andalusian Left alliance in the 2018 election.; ^{2} Arise Andalusians Coalition results are compared to Andalusia by Herself totals in the 2018 election.

=== 2018 ===
Summary of the 2 December 2018 Parliament of Andalusia election results in Huelva
Parties and alliances	Popular vote			Seats	
Parties and alliances	Votes	%	±pp	Total	+/−
Spanish Socialist Workers' Party of Andalusia (PSOE–A)	66,778	31.57	–9.38	4	–2
People's Party (PP)	47,915	22.65	–3.77	3	±0
Citizens–Party of the Citizenry (Cs)	34,393	16.26	+9.02	2	+1
Forward–We Can–United Left–Spring–Andalusian Left (Adelante Andalucía)^{1}	30,187	14.27	–5.14	1	±0
Vox (Vox)	17,636	8.34	+8.07	1	+1
Independents for Huelva (IxH)	3,995	1.89	New	0	±0
Animalist Party Against Mistreatment of Animals (PACMA)	3,208	1.52	+0.79	0	±0
Andalusia by Herself (AxSí)^{2}	1,398	0.66	–0.86	0	±0
Equo Greens–Andalusia Initiative (Equo–Iniciativa)	812	0.38	New	0	±0
Zero Cuts–For a Fairer World–Green Group (Recortes Cero–M+J–GV)^{3}	413	0.20	+0.06	0	±0
Andalusian Nation (NA)	375	0.18	New	0	±0
Communist Party of the Andalusian People (PCPA)	310	0.15	+0.07	0	±0
Union, Progress and Democracy (UPyD)	307	0.15	–1.42	0	±0
Spanish Phalanx of the CNSO (FE de las JONS)	172	0.08	–0.03	0	±0
Blank ballots	3,623	1.71	+0.24		
Total	211,522			11	±0
Valid votes	211,522	97.62	–1.06		
Invalid votes	5,164	2.38	+1.06		
Votes cast / turnout	216,686	54.58	–5.53		
Abstentions	180,291	45.42	+5.53		
Registered voters	396,977				
Sources
Footnotes: ^{1} Forward–We Can–United Left–Spring–Andalusian Left results are compared to the combined totals of We Can and United Left/The Greens–Assembly for Andalusia in the 2015 election.; ^{2} Andalusia by Herself results are compared to Andalusian Party totals in the 2015 election.; ^{3} Zero Cuts–For a Fairer World–Green Group results are compared to Zero Cuts totals in the 2015 election.

=== 2015 ===
Summary of the 22 March 2015 Parliament of Andalusia election results in Huelva
Parties and alliances	Popular vote			Seats	
Parties and alliances	Votes	%	±pp	Total	+/−
Spanish Socialist Workers' Party of Andalusia (PSOE–A)	96,272	40.95	–2.44	6	+1
People's Party (PP)	62,118	26.42	–12.21	3	–2
We Can (Podemos)	30,946	13.16	New	1	+1
Citizens–Party of the Citizenry (C's)	17,027	7.24	New	1	+1
United Left/The Greens–Assembly for Andalusia (IULV–CA)	14,692	6.25	–4.64	0	–1
Union, Progress and Democracy (UPyD)	3,683	1.57	–0.96	0	±0
Andalusian Party (PA)	3,583	1.52	–0.78	0	±0
Animalist Party Against Mistreatment of Animals (PACMA)	1,727	0.73	+0.48	0	±0
Vox (Vox)	637	0.27	New	0	±0
Zero Cuts (Recortes Cero)	329	0.14	New	0	±0
Spanish Phalanx of the CNSO (FE de las JONS)	247	0.11	+0.05	0	±0
Communist Party of the Peoples of Spain (PCPE)	192	0.08	–0.04	0	±0
Change It (Cámbialo)	165	0.07	New	0	±0
Blank ballots	3,456	1.47	+0.59		
Total	235,074			11	±0
Valid votes	235,074	98.68	–0.62		
Invalid votes	3,140	1.32	+0.62		
Votes cast / turnout	238,214	60.11	+0.06		
Abstentions	158,088	39.89	–0.06		
Registered voters	389,211				

=== 2012 ===
Summary of the 25 March 2012 Parliament of Andalusia election results in Huelva
Parties and alliances	Popular vote			Seats	
Parties and alliances	Votes	%	±pp	Total	+/−
Spanish Socialist Workers' Party of Andalusia (PSOE–A)	101,730	43.39	–8.65	5	–1
People's Party (PP)	90,576	38.63	+3.40	5	+1
United Left/The Greens–Assembly for Andalusia (IULV–CA)	25,536	10.89	+3.31	1	±0
Union, Progress and Democracy (UPyD)	5,939	2.53	+1.92	0	±0
Andalusian Party (PA)^{1}	5,395	2.30	–0.35	0	±0
Equo (Equo)	914	0.39	New	0	±0
Animalist Party Against Mistreatment of Animals (PACMA)	577	0.25	New	0	±0
Blank Seats (EB)	430	0.18	New	0	±0
Hartos.org (Hartos.org)	412	0.18	New	0	±0
Communist Party of the Peoples of Spain (PCPE)	289	0.12	New	0	±0
Socialists and Republicans (SyR)	182	0.08	New	0	±0
Communist Unification of Spain (UCE)	165	0.07	New	0	±0
Spanish Phalanx of the CNSO (FE de las JONS)	140	0.06	New	0	±0
Liberal Democratic Centre (CDL)	100	0.04	New	0	±0
Blank ballots	2,057	0.88	–0.07		
Total	234,442			11	±0
Valid votes	234,442	99.30	+0.03		
Invalid votes	1,657	0.70	–0.03		
Votes cast / turnout	236,099	60.05	–10.46		
Abstentions	157,052	39.95	+10.46		
Registered voters	393,151				
Sources
Footnotes: ^{1} Andalusian Party results are compared to Andalusian Coalition totals in the 2008 election.

=== 2008 ===
Summary of the 9 March 2008 Parliament of Andalusia election results in Huelva
Parties and alliances	Popular vote			Seats	
Parties and alliances	Votes	%	±pp	Total	+/−
Spanish Socialist Workers' Party of Andalusia (PSOE–A)	139,476	52.04	–0.83	6	–1
People's Party (PP)	94,428	35.23	+6.46	4	+1
United Left/The Greens–Assembly for Andalusia (IULV–CA)	20,327	7.58	+0.26	1	+1
Andalusian Coalition (CA)^{1}	7,107	2.65	–6.60	0	–1
Union, Progress and Democracy (UPyD)	1,642	0.61	New	0	±0
The Greens (LV)	1,211	0.45	New	0	±0
Andalusian Convergence (CAnda)	367	0.14	New	0	±0
Republican Left (IR)	349	0.13	New	0	±0
Humanist Party (PH)	279	0.10	+0.01	0	±0
Citizens–Party of the Citizenry (C's)	275	0.10	New	0	±0
Blank ballots	2,554	0.95	–0.26		
Total	268,015			11	±0
Valid votes	268,015	99.27	–0.02		
Invalid votes	1,981	0.73	+0.02		
Votes cast / turnout	269,996	70.51	–2.56		
Abstentions	112,947	29.49	+2.56		
Registered voters	382,943				
Sources
Footnotes: ^{1} Andalusian Coalition results are compared to the combined totals of Andalusian Party, Andalusian Forum and Socialist Party of Andalusia in the 2004 election.

=== 2004 ===
Summary of the 14 March 2004 Parliament of Andalusia election results in Huelva
Parties and alliances	Popular vote			Seats	
Parties and alliances	Votes	%	±pp	Total	+/−
Spanish Socialist Workers' Party of Andalusia (PSOE–A)	145,170	52.87	+5.82	7	+1
People's Party (PP)	78,997	28.77	–9.01	3	–2
Andalusian Party (PA)	22,010	8.02	+1.50	1	+1
United Left/The Greens–Assembly for Andalusia (IULV–CA)	20,103	7.32	+0.36	0	±0
Andalusian Forum (FA)	1,712	0.62	New	0	±0
Socialist Party of Andalusia (PSA)	1,669	0.61	New	0	±0
Party of Precarious Workers (PTPRE)	402	0.15	New	0	±0
New Andalusian Green Left (NIVA)	342	0.12	New	0	±0
Andalusia Assembly (A)	265	0.10	+0.01	0	±0
Humanist Party (PH)	260	0.09	–0.02	0	±0
Andalusian Social Democratic Party (PSDA)	185	0.07	New	0	±0
Spanish Phalanx of the CNSO (FE de las JONS)	171	0.06	New	0	±0
Blank ballots	3,318	1.21	+0.13		
Total	274,604			11	±0
Valid votes	274,604	99.29	+0.05		
Invalid votes	1,959	0.71	–0.05		
Votes cast / turnout	276,563	73.07	+6.65		
Abstentions	101,929	26.93	–6.65		
Registered voters	378,492				

=== 2000 ===
Summary of the 12 March 2000 Parliament of Andalusia election results in Huelva
Parties and alliances	Popular vote			Seats	
Parties and alliances	Votes	%	±pp	Total	+/−
Spanish Socialist Workers' Party of Andalusia (PSOE–A)	115,467	47.05	–2.20	6	±0
People's Party (PP)	92,700	37.78	+4.94	5	+1
United Left/The Greens–Assembly for Andalusia (IULV–CA)	17,084	6.96	–4.51	0	–1
Andalusian Party (PA)	15,991	6.52	+1.18	0	±0
Andalusian Left (IA)	478	0.19	New	0	±0
Andalusian Nation (NA)	358	0.15	–0.01	0	±0
Humanist Party (PH)	275	0.11	+0.01	0	±0
Andalusia Assembly (A)	209	0.09	New	0	±0
The Phalanx (FE)	185	0.08	New	0	±0
Blank ballots	2,647	1.08	+0.45		
Total	245,394			11	±0
Valid votes	245,394	99.24	+0.22		
Invalid votes	1,872	0.76	–0.22		
Votes cast / turnout	247,266	66.42	–8.85		
Abstentions	125,006	33.58	+8.85		
Registered voters	372,272				

=== 1996 ===
Summary of the 3 March 1996 Parliament of Andalusia election results in Huelva
Parties and alliances	Popular vote			Seats	
Parties and alliances	Votes	%	±pp	Total	+/−
Spanish Socialist Workers' Party of Andalusia (PSOE–A)	130,355	49.25	+5.17	6	+1
People's Party (PP)	86,931	32.84	–0.46	4	±0
United Left/The Greens–Assembly for Andalusia (IULV–CA)	30,371	11.47	–4.27	1	–1
Andalusian Party (PA)^{1}	14,123	5.34	+0.13	0	±0
Andalusian Nation (NA)	413	0.16	–0.19	0	±0
Communist Party of the Andalusian People (PCPA)	398	0.15	–0.13	0	±0
Humanist Party (PH)	266	0.10	–0.07	0	±0
Authentic Spanish Phalanx (FEA)	155	0.06	New	0	±0
Blank ballots	1,673	0.63	–0.14		
Total	264,685			11	±0
Valid votes	264,685	99.02	–0.32		
Invalid votes	2,610	0.98	+0.32		
Votes cast / turnout	267,295	75.27	+12.66		
Abstentions	87,836	24.73	–12.66		
Registered voters	355,131				
Sources
Footnotes: ^{1} Andalusian Party results are compared to Andalusian Coalition–Andalusian Power totals in the 1994 election.

=== 1994 ===
Summary of the 12 June 1994 Parliament of Andalusia election results in Huelva
Parties and alliances	Popular vote			Seats	
Parties and alliances	Votes	%	±pp	Total	+/−
Spanish Socialist Workers' Party of Andalusia (PSOE–A)	93,983	44.08	–11.72	5	–2
People's Party (PP)	70,995	33.30	+11.11	4	+2
United Left/The Greens–Assembly for Andalusia (IULV–CA)	33,559	15.74	+6.43	2	+1
Andalusian Coalition–Andalusian Power (PA–PAP)^{1}	11,108	5.21	–3.01	0	–1
Andalusian Nation (NA)^{2}	747	0.35	+0.29	0	±0
Communist Party of the Andalusian People (PCPA)	587	0.28	+0.08	0	±0
Humanist Party (PH)	366	0.17	+0.09	0	±0
Spanish Phalanx of the CNSO (FE–JONS)	213	0.10	+0.03	0	±0
Blank ballots	1,644	0.77	+0.34		
Total	213,202			11	±0
Valid votes	213,202	99.34	–0.29		
Invalid votes	1,406	0.66	+0.29		
Votes cast / turnout	214,608	62.61	+9.87		
Abstentions	128,179	37.39	–9.87		
Registered voters	342,787				
Sources
Footnotes: ^{1} Andalusian Coalition–Andalusian Power results are compared to Andalusian Party totals in the 1990 election.; ^{2} Andalusian Nation results are compared to Andalusian Front of Liberation totals in the 1990 election.

=== 1990 ===
Summary of the 23 June 1990 Parliament of Andalusia election results in Huelva
Parties and alliances	Popular vote			Seats	
Parties and alliances	Votes	%	±pp	Total	+/−
Spanish Socialist Workers' Party of Andalusia (PSOE–A)	94,622	55.80	+1.59	7	±0
People's Party (PP)^{1}	37,618	22.19	+1.25	2	–1
United Left–Assembly for Andalusia (IU–CA)	15,793	9.31	–3.53	1	±0
Andalusian Party (PA)	13,932	8.22	+3.22	1	+1
Democratic and Social Centre (CDS)	1,960	1.16	–2.11	0	±0
Socialist Democracy (DS)	875	0.52	New	0	±0
The Ecologist Greens (LVE)	846	0.50	New	0	±0
Workers' Party of Spain–Communist Unity (PTE–UC)^{2}	730	0.43	–0.95	0	±0
Greens of Andalusia (VA)	673	0.40	New	0	±0
Ruiz-Mateos Group (ARM)	622	0.37	New	0	±0
Communist Party of Spain (Marxist–Leninist) (PCE (m–l))	345	0.20	New	0	±0
Communist Party of the Andalusian People (PCPA)	340	0.20	New	0	±0
Humanist Party (PH)	139	0.08	–0.17	0	±0
Spanish Phalanx of the CNSO (FE–JONS)	120	0.07	New	0	±0
Alliance for the Republic (AxR)	119	0.07	New	0	±0
Andalusian Front of Liberation (FAL)	96	0.06	New	0	±0
Blank ballots	735	0.43	+0.03		
Total	169,565			11	±0
Valid votes	169,565	99.63	+1.35		
Invalid votes	623	0.37	–1.35		
Votes cast / turnout	170,188	52.74	–14.94		
Abstentions	152,488	47.26	+14.94		
Registered voters	322,676				
Sources
Footnotes: ^{1} People's Party results are compared to People's Coalition totals in the 1986 election.; ^{2} Workers' Party of Spain–Communist Unity results are compared to Communists' Unity Board totals in the 1986 election.

=== 1986 ===
Summary of the 22 June 1986 Parliament of Andalusia election results in Huelva
Parties and alliances	Popular vote			Seats	
Parties and alliances	Votes	%	±pp	Total	+/−
Spanish Socialist Workers' Party of Andalusia (PSOE–A)	113,301	54.21	–1.49	7	–1
People's Coalition (AP–PDP–PL)^{1}	43,758	20.94	+8.32	3	+2
United Left–Assembly for Andalusia (IU–CA)^{2}	26,834	12.84	+7.02	1	+1
Andalusian Party (PA)	10,442	5.00	+0.84	0	±0
Democratic and Social Centre (CDS)	6,841	3.27	New	0	±0
Communists' Unity Board (MUC)	2,881	1.38	New	0	±0
Socialist Party of the Andalusian People (PSPA)	1,620	0.78	New	0	±0
Democratic Reformist Party (PRD)	1,492	0.71	New	0	±0
Humanist Party (PH)	514	0.25	New	0	±0
Andalusian Liberation (LA)	487	0.23	New	0	±0
Union of the Democratic Centre (UCD)	n/a	n/a	–18.66	0	–2
Blank ballots	834	0.40	+0.11		
Total	209,004			11	±0
Valid votes	209,004	98.28	–0.98		
Invalid votes	3,668	1.72	+0.98		
Votes cast / turnout	212,672	67.68	+7.03		
Abstentions	101,574	32.32	–7.03		
Registered voters	314,246				
Sources
Footnotes: ^{1} People's Coalition results are compared to People's Alliance–People's Democratic Party totals in the 1982 election.; ^{2} United Left–Assembly for Andalusia results are compared to the combined totals of Communist Party of Andalusia and Socialist Party in the 1982 election.

=== 1982 ===
Summary of the 23 May 1982 Parliament of Andalusia election results in Huelva
Parties and alliances	Popular vote			Seats	
Parties and alliances	Votes	%	±pp	Total	+/−
Spanish Socialist Workers' Party of Andalusia (PSOE–A)	96,856	55.70	n/a	8	n/a
Union of the Democratic Centre (UCD)	32,452	18.66	n/a	2	n/a
People's Alliance (AP)	21,936	12.62	n/a	1	n/a
Communist Party of Andalusia (PCA–PCE)	9,155	5.27	n/a	0	n/a
Socialist Party of Andalusia–Andalusian Party (PSA–PA)	7,241	4.16	n/a	0	n/a
New Force (FN)	2,604	1.50	n/a	0	n/a
Socialist Party (PS)	949	0.55	n/a	0	n/a
Communist Unification of Spain (UCE)	783	0.45	n/a	0	n/a
Communist Movement of Andalusia (MCA)	674	0.39	n/a	0	n/a
Revolutionary Communist League (LCR)	393	0.23	n/a	0	n/a
Falangist Movement of Spain (MFE)	327	0.19	n/a	0	n/a
Blank ballots	512	0.29	n/a		
Total	173,882			11	n/a
Valid votes	173,882	99.26	n/a		
Invalid votes	1,304	0.74	n/a		
Votes cast / turnout	175,186	60.65	n/a		
Abstentions	113,662	39.35	n/a		
Registered voters	288,848				

== Bibliography ==
- Real Decreto-ley 20/1977, de 18 de marzo, sobre Normas Electorales (Royal Decree-Law 20/1977). Official State Gazette (in Spanish). 18 March 1977. BOE-A-1977-7445.
- Ley Orgánica 6/1981, de 30 de diciembre, de Estatuto de Autonomía para Andalucía (Organic Law 6/1981). Official State Gazette (in Spanish). 30 December 1981. BOE-A-1982-633.
- Decreto 18/1982, de ocho de Marzo, por el que se convocan Elecciones al Parlamento de Andalucía (PDF) (Decree 18/1982). Official Gazette of the Regional Government of Andalusia (in Spanish). 8 March 1982.
- Ley Orgánica 5/1985, de 19 de junio, del Régimen Electoral General (Organic Law 5/1985). Official State Gazette (in Spanish). 19 June 1985. BOE-A-1985-11672.
- Ley 1/1986, de 2 de enero, Electoral de Andalucía (Law 1/1986). Official State Gazette (in Spanish). 2 January 1986. BOE-A-1986-2788.
- Ley Orgánica 2/2007, de 19 de marzo, de reforma del Estatuto de Autonomía para Andalucía (Organic Law 2/2007). Official State Gazette (in Spanish). 19 March 2007. BOE-A-2007-5825.
