= 1990 Andalusian regional election =

Election in the Spanish region of Andalusia

- 23 June 1990 (Note: A by-election was held on 6 October 1990 in several polling stations in the municipalities of Pulpí, Albox, Vélez-Rubio and Cuevas de Almanzora, due to results being voided by the High Court of Justice of Andalusia on 25 July.)

All 109 seats in the Parliament of Andalusia 55 seats needed for a majority
- Opinion polls
- Registered: 5,007,675 ▲3.9%
- Turnout: 2,771,384 (55.3%) ▼15.4 pp
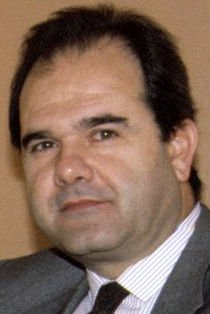

	First party	Second party	Third party
Leader	Manuel Chaves	Gabino Puche	Luis Carlos Rejón
Party	PSOE–A	PP	IU–CA
Leader since	19 April 1990	8 February 1987	21 July 1988
Leader's seat	Cádiz	Jaén	Córdoba
Last election	60 seats, 47.0%	28 seats, 22.2% (Note: Results for AP–PDP–PL in the 1986 election.)	19 seats, 17.8%
Seats won	62	26	11
Seat change	▲2	▼2	▼8
Popular vote	1,368,576	611,734	349,640
Percentage	49.6%	22.2%	12.7%
Swing	▲2.6 pp	0.0 pp	▼5.1 pp
	Fourth party
Leader	Pedro Pacheco
Party	PA
Leader since	June 1986
Leader's seat	Cádiz
Last election	2 seats, 5.9%
Seats won	10
Seat change	▲8
Popular vote	296,558
Percentage	10.8%
Swing	▲4.9 pp
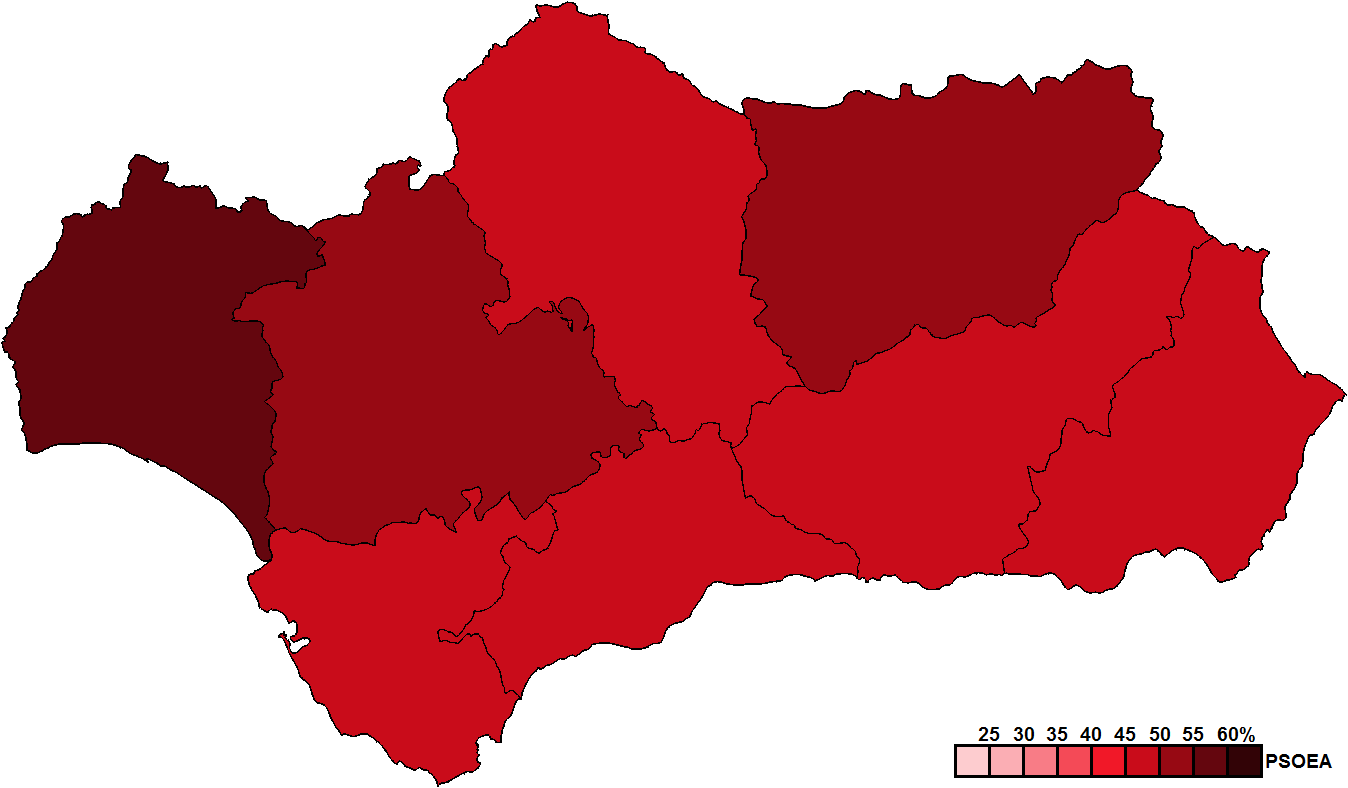
- Constituency results map for the Parliament of Andalusia
President before election
José Rodríguez de la Borbolla
PSOE–A
President after election
Manuel Chaves
PSOE–A

A regional election was held in Andalusia on 23 June 1990 to elect the 3rd Parliament of the autonomous community. All 109 seats in the Parliament were up for election.

The candidate for the PSOE, Manuel Chaves, was invested as President of the Regional Government of Andalusia for the first time, after winning the election with an absolute majority of seats. He would remain in the presidency of this autonomous community for the longest period of time than any of his predecessors, not stepping down from office until 2009.

== Overview ==
Under the 1981 Statute of Autonomy, the Parliament of Andalusia was the unicameral legislature of the homonymous autonomous community, having legislative power in devolved matters, as well as the ability to grant or withdraw confidence from a regional president. The electoral and procedural rules were supplemented by national law provisions.

=== Date ===
The term of the Parliament of Andalusia expired four years after the date of its previous election. The election decree was required to be issued no later than 25 days before the scheduled expiration date of parliament and published on the following day in the Official Gazette of the Regional Government of Andalusia (BOJA), with election day taking place between 54 and 60 days after the decree's publication (amendments earlier in 1990 barred any election date within from 1 July to 31 August). The previous election was held on 22 June 1986, which meant that the chamber's term would have expired on 22 June 1990. Due to the ban on summer elections, the latest possible date for election day was 30 June 1990, meaning the election decree was required to be published in the BOJA no later than 1 May 1990.

The Parliament of Andalusia could not be dissolved before the expiration date of parliament.

The election to the Parliament of Andalusia was officially called on 30 April 1990 with the publication of the corresponding decree in the BOJA, setting election day for 23 June and scheduling for the chamber to reconvene on 16 July.

=== Electoral system ===
Voting for the Parliament was based on universal suffrage, comprising all Spanish nationals over 18 years of age, registered in Andalusia and with full political rights, provided that they had not been deprived of the right to vote by a final sentence, nor were legally incapacitated.

The Parliament of Andalusia had a minimum of 90 and a maximum of 110 seats, with electoral provisions fixing its size at 109. All were elected in eight multi-member constituencies—corresponding to the provinces of Almería, Cádiz, Córdoba, Granada, Huelva, Jaén, Málaga and Seville, each of which was assigned an initial minimum of eight seats and the remaining 45 distributed in proportion to population (with the number of seats in each province not exceeding two times that of any other)—using the D'Hondt method and closed-list proportional voting, with a three percent-threshold of valid votes (including blank ballots) in each constituency. The use of this electoral method resulted in a higher effective threshold depending on district magnitude and vote distribution.

As a result of the aforementioned allocation, each Parliament constituency was entitled the following seats:

Seats	Constituencies
18	Seville
16	Málaga^{(+1)}
15	Cádiz
13	Córdoba, Granada
12	Jaén^{(−1)}
11	Almería, Huelva,

The law did not provide for by-elections to fill vacant seats; instead, any vacancies arising after the proclamation of candidates and during the legislative term were filled by the next candidates on the party lists or, when required, by designated substitutes.

=== Outgoing parliament ===
The table below shows the composition of the parliamentary groups in the chamber at the time of the election call.

Parliamentary composition in April 1990
Parliamentary groups	Parties	Legislators	
Parliamentary groups	Parties	Seats	Total
Socialist Parliamentary Group	PSOE–A	60	60
Andalusian People's Parliamentary Group	PP	19	19
United Left Parliamentary Group	PCA–PCE	13	17
United Left Parliamentary Group	FP	2	17
United Left Parliamentary Group	PASOC	1	17
United Left Parliamentary Group	INDEP	1	17
Mixed Group	PA	2	13
Mixed Group	PCPA	1	13
Mixed Group	BOCA	1 (Note: Cristóbal Jiménez, former PCPA legislator.)	13
Mixed Group	INDEP	9 (Note: José F. Lorca, Antonio Fernández Jurado and Gonzalo Rodríguez, former AP legislators; Miguel del Pino, Vicente Fernández-Capel, Luis F. Plaza and Juan Santaella, former PDP legislators; Antonio Hernández Caire, Roberto Sáenz, former PL legislators.)	13

== Parties and candidates ==
The electoral law allowed for parties and federations registered in the interior ministry, alliances and groupings of electors to present lists of candidates. Parties and federations intending to form an alliance were required to inform the relevant electoral commission within 10 days of the election call, whereas groupings of electors needed to secure the signature of at least one percent of the electorate in the constituencies for which they sought election, disallowing electors from signing for more than one list.

Below is a list of the main parties and alliances which contested the election:

Candidacy	Parties and alliances	Leading candidate	Ideology	Previous result		Gov.	Ref.
Candidacy	Parties and alliances	Leading candidate	Ideology	Vote %	Seats	Gov.	Ref.
PSOE–A	List: Spanish Socialist Workers' Party of Andalusia (PSOE–A)	Manuel Chaves	Social democracy	47.0%	60	Yes	
PP	List: People's Party (PP)	Gabino Puche	Conservatism; Christian democracy	22.2%	28	No	
IU–CA	List: Communist Party of Andalusia (PCA–PCE); Socialist Action Party (PASOC); Republican Left (IR); United Candidacy of Workers (CUT)	Luis Carlos Rejón	Socialism; Communism	17.8%	19	No	
PA	List: Andalusian Party (PA)	Pedro Pacheco	Andalusian nationalism Social democracy	5.9%	2	No	

== Opinion polls ==
The tables below list opinion polling results in reverse chronological order, showing the most recent first and using the dates when the survey fieldwork was done, as opposed to the date of publication. Where the fieldwork dates are unknown, the date of publication is given instead. The highest percentage figure in each polling survey is displayed with its background shaded in the leading party's colour. If a tie ensues, this is applied to the figures with the highest percentages. The "Lead" column on the right shows the percentage-point difference between the parties with the highest percentages in a poll.

=== Voting intention estimates ===
The table below lists weighted voting intention estimates. Refusals are generally excluded from the party vote percentages, while question wording and the treatment of "don't know" responses and those not intending to vote may vary between polling organisations. When available, seat projections determined by the polling organisations are displayed below (or in place of) the percentages in a smaller font; 55 seats were required for an absolute majority in the Parliament of Andalusia.

Polling firm/Commissioner	Fieldwork date	Sample size	Turnout	PSOE–A	AP	IULV–CA	PA	CDS	PP	ARM	Lead
1990 regional election	23 Jun 1990	—N/a	55.3	49.6; 62	(Note: Within PP.)	12.7; 11	10.8; 10	1.2; 0	22.2; 26	0.6; 0	27.4
Sigma Dos/El Mundo	17 Jun 1990	?	?	47.5; 58		–	–	–	21.5; 26	–	26.0
Opina/La Vanguardia	11–13 Jun 1990	2,504	60–65	44.6; 54/58		13.6; 13	16.8; 17/19	1.9; 0	20.0; 19/24	–	24.6
Gruppo/ABC	11–13 Jun 1990	3,200	?	46.8; 58/60		14.6; 14/16	10.2; 8/11	2.7; 0	22.2; 24/27	–	24.6
Demoscopia/El País	7–12 Jun 1990	3,200	69	46.3; 58/61		12.7; 12/14	12.3; 9/10	–	21.6; 27	–	24.7
GGC Research/Rato	6–8 Jun 1990	3,150	?	46.8; 57/63		14.3; 13/15	10.3; 8/10	–	21.3; 25/27	–	25.5
Gruppo/ABC	25–28 May 1990	1,000	?	46.6; 59/61		14.2; 14/15	10.1; 8/9	2.8; 0	22.0; 26/28	–	24.6
Demoscopia/El País	23–27 May 1990	3,200	?	46.8; 58/60		? 14/15	? 9/11	–	? 26/27	–	?
Opina/La Vanguardia	3–5 May 1990	?	?	42.7		13.1	15.6	2.3	22.3	–	20.4
Sociología Andaluza/PCA	25 Apr 1990	2,000	?	45.7		14.4	12.8	–	20.8	–	24.9
CIS	8 Apr 1990	?	?	? 54/56		? 15	? 10	? 0	? 24	–	?
Sociología Andaluza/PCA	25 Feb 1990	2,500	?	47.9		14.1	12.1	–	17.9	–	30.0
Insight/PP	5–19 Feb 1990	3,894	?	? 53/57		? 19	? 8/10	–	? 27/30	–	?
1989 general election	29 Oct 1989	—N/a	69.3	52.5 (67)		12.0 (12)	6.2 (3)	4.7 (2)	20.2 (25)	1.5 (0)	32.3
1989 EP election	15 Jun 1989	—N/a	52.8	50.3 (70)		9.0 (8)	10.4 (9)	4.1 (1)	16.1 (20)	4.1 (1)	34.2
PCA	1–11 Feb 1989	816	?	38.4; 44/46		18.8; 20/21	? 10	–	? 25/28	–	?
Metra Seis/PA	15 Jan 1988	?	?	? 46	? 20/21	? 16	? 19/20	? 7	–	–	?
1987 EP election	10 Jun 1987	—N/a	65.8	48.3 (63)	21.3 (27)	10.8 (10)	5.6 (3)	7.2 (6)	–	–	27.0
1986 regional election	22 Jun 1986	—N/a	70.7	47.0; 60	22.2; 28	17.8; 19	5.9; 2	3.3; 0	–	–	24.8

== Results ==
=== Overall ===
← Summary of the 23 June 1990 Parliament of Andalusia election results →
Parties and alliances	Popular vote			Seats	
Parties and alliances	Votes	%	±pp	Total	+/−
Spanish Socialist Workers' Party of Andalusia (PSOE–A)	1,368,576	49.61	+2.55	62	+2
People's Party (PP)^{1}	611,734	22.17	±0.00	26	−2
United Left–Assembly for Andalusia (IU–CA)	349,640	12.67	−5.14	11	−8
Andalusian Party (PA)	296,558	10.75	+4.89	10	+8
Democratic and Social Centre (CDS)	32,712	1.19	−2.07	0	±0
Ruiz-Mateos Group (ARM)	15,637	0.57	New	0	±0
Workers' Party of Spain–Communist Unity (PTE–UC)^{2}	14,812	0.54	−0.97	0	±0
Socialist Democracy (DS)	14,495	0.53	New	0	±0
Greens of Andalusia (VA)	13,979	0.51	New	0	±0
The Ecologist Greens (LVE)	12,645	0.46	New	0	±0
Communist Party of the Andalusian People (PCPA)	6,299	0.23	New	0	±0
Communist Party of Spain (Marxist–Leninist) (PCE (m–l))	2,401	0.09	New	0	±0
Spanish Phalanx of the CNSO (FE–JONS)	2,308	0.08	New	0	±0
Humanist Party (PH)	1,869	0.07	−0.14	0	±0
Andalusian Front of Liberation (FAL)	1,633	0.06	New	0	±0
Alliance for the Republic (AxR)	698	0.03	New	0	±0
Falangist Movement of Spain (MFE)	560	0.02	±0.00	0	±0
Andalusian Centrist Unity (UCA)	230	0.01	New	0	±0
Blank ballots	12,024	0.44	+0.07		
Total	2,758,810			109	±0
Valid votes	2,758,810	99.55	+1.04		
Invalid votes	12,574	0.45	−1.04		
Votes cast / turnout	2,771,384	55.34	−15.37		
Abstentions	2,236,291	44.66	+15.37		
Registered voters	5,007,675				
Sources
Footnotes: ^{1} People's Party results are compared to People's Coalition totals in the 1986 election.; ^{2} Workers' Party of Spain–Communist Unity results are compared to Communists' Unity Board totals in the 1986 election.

Popular vote
PSOE–A	49.61%
PP	22.17%
IU–CA	12.67%
PA	10.75%
CDS	1.19%
Others	3.17%
Blank ballots	0.44%

Seats
PSOE–A	56.88%
PP	23.85%
IU–CA	10.09%
PA	9.17%

=== Distribution by constituency ===
Constituency	PSOE–A		PP		IU–CA		PA	
Constituency	%	S	%	S	%	S	%	S
Almería	50.0	7	28.5	3	9.0	1	6.6	−
Cádiz	46.6	8	15.5	2	10.0	1	21.6	4
Córdoba	47.3	7	20.7	3	18.8	2	9.3	1
Granada	48.9	7	27.9	4	11.8	1	6.2	1
Huelva	55.8	7	22.2	2	9.3	1	8.2	1
Jaén	51.8	7	27.2	4	11.5	1	5.6	−
Málaga	49.3	9	22.0	4	14.6	2	8.8	1
Seville	50.4	10	19.5	4	12.5	2	13.6	2
Total	49.6	62	22.2	26	12.7	11	10.7	10

== Aftermath ==
=== Government formation ===
Investiture; Nomination of Manuel Chaves (PSOE–A)
Ballot →	24 July 1990
Required majority →	55 out of 109
Yes: • PSOE–A (62)	62 / 109
No: • PP (26); • IU–CA (11); • PA (10)	47 / 109
Abstentions	0 / 109
Absentees	0 / 109

== Bibliography ==
- Ley Orgánica 6/1981, de 30 de diciembre, de Estatuto de Autonomía para Andalucía (Organic Law 6/1981). Official State Gazette (in Spanish). 30 December 1981. BOE-A-1982-633.
- Ley 6/1983, de 21 de julio, del Gobierno y la Administración de la Comunidad Autónoma (Law 6/1983). Official State Gazette (in Spanish). 21 July 1983. BOE-A-1983-23960.
- Ley Orgánica 5/1985, de 19 de junio, del Régimen Electoral General (Organic Law 5/1985). Official State Gazette (in Spanish). 19 June 1985 [version as of 3 April 1987]. BOE-A-1985-11672.
- Ley 1/1986, de 2 de enero, Electoral de Andalucía (Law 1/1986). Official State Gazette (in Spanish). 2 January 1986 [version as of 14 January 1986]. BOE-A-1986-2788.
- Ley 1/1990, de 30 de enero, por la que se modifica la Ley 6/1983, de 21 de julio, del Gobierno y la Administración de la Comunidad Autónoma (Law 1/1990). Official State Gazette (in Spanish). 30 January 1990. BOE-A-1990-4236.
- Decreto del Presidente 122/1990, de 29 de abril, por el que se convocan Elecciones al Parlamento de Andalucía (PDF) (Decree 122/1990). Official Gazette of the Regional Government of Andalusia (in Spanish). 29 April 1990.
- Decreto del Presidente 300/1990, de 12 de septiembre, por el que, en ejecución de la sentencia de la Sala de lo Contencioso Administrativo del Tribunal Superior de Justicia de Andalucía, de 25 de julio de 1990, se convoca el acto de la votación para las elecciones al Parlamento de Andalucía en cinco mesas electorales de la provincia de Almería (PDF) (Decree 300/1990). Official Gazette of the Regional Government of Andalusia (in Spanish). 12 September 1990.
