= 1986 Andalusian regional election =

Election in the Spanish region of Andalusia

- 22 June 1986

All 109 seats in the Parliament of Andalusia 55 seats needed for a majority
- Opinion polls
- Registered: 4,819,132 ▲11.0%
- Turnout: 3,412,797 (70.8%) ▲4.6 pp
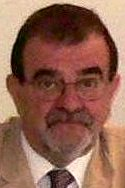

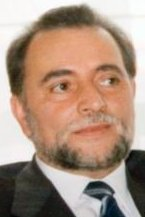

	First party	Second party	Third party
Leader	José Rodríguez de la Borbolla	Antonio Hernández Mancha	Julio Anguita
Party	PSOE–A	AP–PDP–PL	IU–CA
Leader since	8 March 1984	1980	1986
Leader's seat	Seville	Córdoba	Córdoba
Last election	66 seats, 52.6%	17 seats, 17.0% (Note: Results for AP in the 1982 election.)	8 seats, 8.6% (Note: Results for PCA–PCE (8.5%, 8 seats) and PS (0.0%, 0 seats) in the 1982 election.)
Seats won	60	28	19
Seat change	▼6	▲11	▲11
Popular vote	1,581,513	745,485	598,889
Percentage	47.0%	22.2%	17.8%
Swing	▼5.6 pp	▲5.2 pp	▲9.2 pp
	Fourth party
Leader	Luis Uruñuela
Party	PA
Leader since	1976
Leader's seat	Seville
Last election	3 seats, 5.4%
Seats won	2
Seat change	▼1
Popular vote	196,947
Percentage	5.9%
Swing	▲0.5 pp
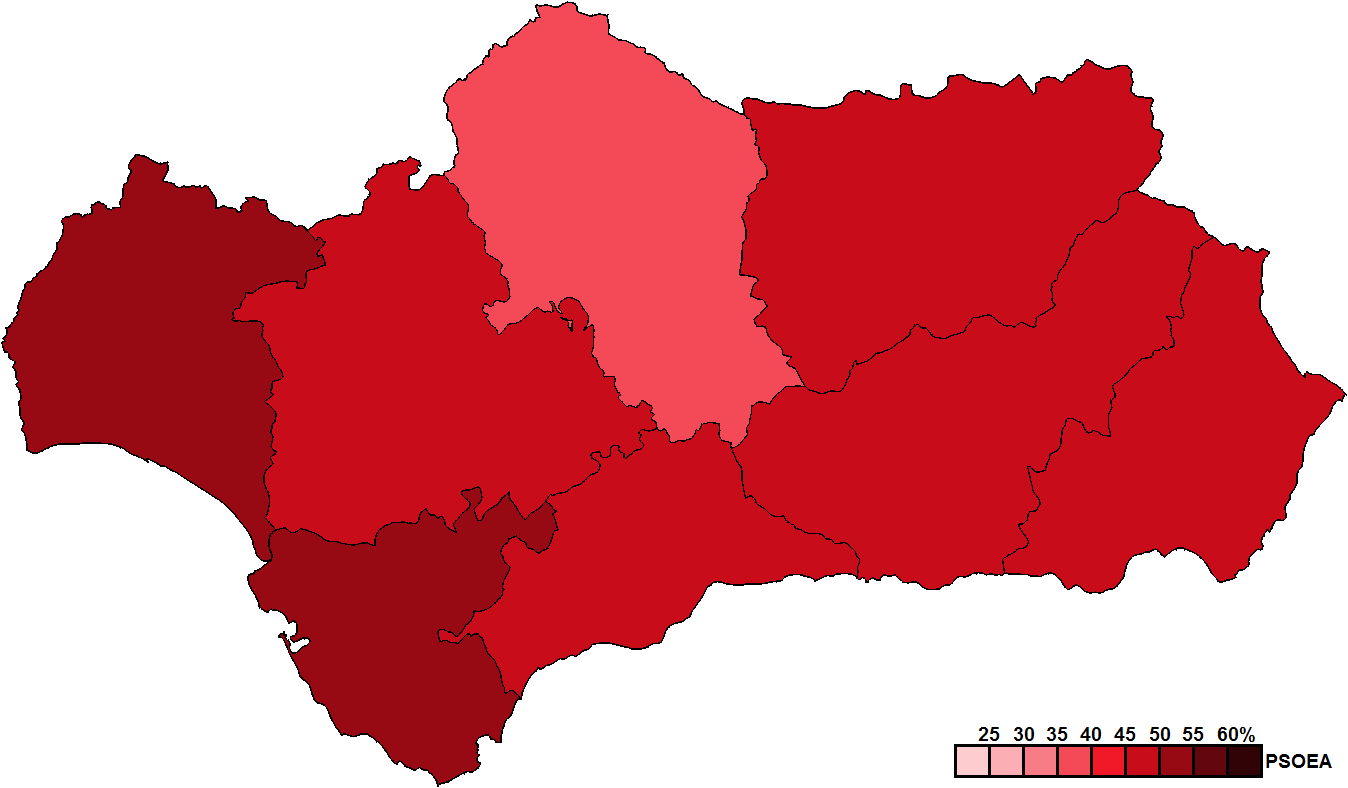
- Constituency results map for the Parliament of Andalusia
President before election
José Rodríguez de la Borbolla
PSOE–A
President after election
José Rodríguez de la Borbolla
PSOE–A

A regional election was held in Andalusia on 22 June 1986 to elect the 2nd Parliament of the autonomous community. All 109 seats in the Parliament were up for election. It was held concurrently with the 1986 Spanish general election.

The former president of the Regional Government of Andalusia Rafael Escuredo had been replaced in the post by José Rodríguez de la Borbolla in March 1984. Escuredo's resignation had been forced by his party, the Spanish Socialist Workers' Party (PSOE–A), allegedly over a scandal involving a chalet owned by Escuredo that was claimed to have been built with preferential treatment by Dragados; in reality, Escuredo's demise was a result of tensions with the central government of Felipe González over transfer of regional powers, his agrarian reform proposal and a perception that Escuredo's style was growing increasingly nationalist.

The election saw Rodríguez de la Borbolla's PSOE–A renew its mandate, albeit with a slightly reduced majority. The dissolution and subsequent disappearance of the Union of the Democratic Centre (UCD) paved the way for the right-wing People's Coalition—the electoral alliance of the People's Alliance (AP), the People's Democratic Party (PDP) and the Liberal Party (PL)—to amalgamate around itself most of the centre-right vote in Andalusia, but at 22.2% and 28 seats this still placed it well below the PSOE–A's score. In contrast, the left-wing United Left–Assembly for Andalusia (IU–CA), the Communist Party of Spain (PCE)-led coalition formed in Spain in the aftermath of the NATO membership referendum held on 12 March, achieved a major electoral breakthrough under the candidacy of former Córdoba mayor Julio Anguita, scoring almost 18% of the share, 19 seats and coming within a three-point margin of becoming the most voted political party in the Córdoba constituency.

== Overview ==
Under the 1981 Statute of Autonomy, the Parliament of Andalusia was the unicameral legislature of the homonymous autonomous community, having legislative power in devolved matters, as well as the ability to grant or withdraw confidence from a regional president. The electoral and procedural rules were supplemented by national law provisions.

=== Date ===
The term of the Parliament of Andalusia expired four years after the date of its previous election. The election decree was required to be issued no later than 25 days before the scheduled expiration date of parliament and published on the following day in the Official Gazette of the Regional Government of Andalusia (BOJA), with election day taking place between 54 and 60 days after the decree's publication (and in any case within from 30 to 60 days after the parliament's expiration). The previous election was held on 23 May 1982, which meant that the chamber's term would have expired on 23 May 1986. The election decree was required to be published in the BOJA no later than 28 April 1986, setting the latest possible date for election day on 27 June 1986.

The Parliament of Andalusia could not be dissolved before the expiration date of parliament.

The election to the Parliament of Andalusia was officially called on 29 April 1986 with the publication of the corresponding decree in the BOJA, setting election day for 22 June and scheduling for the chamber to reconvene on 17 July.

=== Electoral system ===
Voting for the Parliament was based on universal suffrage, comprising all Spanish nationals over 18 years of age, registered in Andalusia and with full political rights, provided that they had not been deprived of the right to vote by a final sentence, nor were legally incapacitated.

The Parliament of Andalusia had a minimum of 90 and a maximum of 110 seats, with electoral provisions fixing its size at 109. All were elected in eight multi-member constituencies—corresponding to the provinces of Almería, Cádiz, Córdoba, Granada, Huelva, Jaén, Málaga and Seville, each of which was assigned an initial minimum of eight seats and the remaining 45 distributed in proportion to population (with the number of seats in each province not exceeding two times that of any other)—using the D'Hondt method and closed-list proportional voting, with a three percent-threshold of valid votes (including blank ballots) in each constituency. The use of this electoral method resulted in a higher effective threshold depending on district magnitude and vote distribution.

As a result of the aforementioned allocation, each Parliament constituency was entitled the following seats:

Seats	Constituencies
18	Seville
15	Cádiz, Málaga
13	Córdoba, Granada, Jaén
11	Almería, Huelva

The law did not provide for by-elections to fill vacant seats; instead, any vacancies arising after the proclamation of candidates and during the legislative term were filled by the next candidates on the party lists or, when required, by designated substitutes.

=== Outgoing parliament ===
The table below shows the composition of the parliamentary groups in the chamber at the time of the election call.

Parliamentary composition in April 1986
Parliamentary groups	Parties	Legislators	
Parliamentary groups	Parties	Seats	Total
Socialist Parliamentary Group	PSOE–A	64	64
People's Alliance of Andalusia Parliamentary Group	AP	16	16
Andalusian Centrist Parliamentary Group	INDEP (Note: UCD legislators until the dissolution of the party in February 1983.)	10	10
Andalusian Communist Parliamentary Group	PCA–PCE	6	6
Andalusian Parliamentary Group	PA	3	3
Mixed Group	INDEP	6 (Note: José Cuevas, Miguel del Pino, Nicolás Linares, Luis Merino and Emiliano Sanz, former UCD legislators; Juan Antonio Romero, former PCA–PCE legislator.)	10
Mixed Group	PSPA	2 (Note: Juan Carmona Infante and José María Sánchez, former PSOE–A legislators.)	10
Mixed Group	PRD	1 (Note: José Rodríguez, former AP legislator.)	10
Mixed Group	PTE–UC	1 (Note: Rafael Fernández-Piñar, former PCA–PCE legislator.)	10

== Parties and candidates ==
The electoral law allowed for parties and federations registered in the interior ministry, alliances and groupings of electors to present lists of candidates. Parties and federations intending to form an alliance were required to inform the relevant electoral commission within 10 days of the election call, whereas groupings of electors needed to secure the signature of at least one percent of the electorate in the constituencies for which they sought election, disallowing electors from signing for more than one list.

Below is a list of the main parties and alliances which contested the election:

Candidacy	Parties and alliances	Leading candidate	Ideology	Previous result		Gov.	Ref.
Candidacy	Parties and alliances	Leading candidate	Ideology	Vote %	Seats	Gov.	Ref.
PSOE–A	List: Spanish Socialist Workers' Party of Andalusia (PSOE–A)	José Rodríguez de la Borbolla	Social democracy	52.6%	66	Yes	
AP–PDP–PL	List: People's Alliance (AP); People's Democratic Party (PDP); Liberal Party (PL)	Antonio Hernández Mancha	Conservatism; Christian democracy	17.0%	17	No	
IU–CA	List: Communist Party of Andalusia (PCA–PCE); Socialist Action Party (PASOC); Communist Party of the Peoples of Andalusia (PCPA); Progressive Federation (FP); Carlist Party (PC); Humanist Party (PH); Republican Left (IR)	Julio Anguita	Socialism; Communism	8.6%	8	No	
PA	List: Andalusian Party (PA)	Luis Uruñuela	Andalusian nationalism Social democracy	5.4%	3	No	

== Opinion polls ==
The tables below list opinion polling results in reverse chronological order, showing the most recent first and using the dates when the survey fieldwork was done, as opposed to the date of publication. Where the fieldwork dates are unknown, the date of publication is given instead. The highest percentage figure in each polling survey is displayed with its background shaded in the leading party's colour. If a tie ensues, this is applied to the figures with the highest percentages. The "Lead" column on the right shows the percentage-point difference between the parties with the highest percentages in a poll.

=== Voting intention estimates ===
The table below lists weighted voting intention estimates. Refusals are generally excluded from the party vote percentages, while question wording and the treatment of "don't know" responses and those not intending to vote may vary between polling organisations. When available, seat projections determined by the polling organisations are displayed below (or in place of) the percentages in a smaller font; 55 seats were required for an absolute majority in the Parliament of Andalusia.

Polling firm/Commissioner	Fieldwork date	Sample size	Turnout	PSOE	AP	UCD	PCA–PCE	PA	AP–PDP–PL	CDS	IU	Lead
1986 regional election	22 Jun 1986	—N/a	66.2	47.0; 60	(Note: Within AP–PDP–PL.)	–	(Note: Within IU–CA.)	5.9; 2	22.2; 28	3.3; 0	17.8; 19	24.8
Emopública/Grupo 16	15 Jun 1986	?	?	? 66		–		? 6	? 8	? 2	? 27	?
Demoscopia/El País	5–8 Jun 1986	?	?	49.0; 58/66		–		7.0; 3/5	21.0; 20/25	4.0; 3/5	15.0; 10/14	28.0
Demoscopia/El País	24–27 May 1986	?	?	57.0; 69/77		–		2.0; 1/2	23.0; 18/25	7.0; 6/7	7.0; 7/8	34.0
GAES/PA	27 Dec 1985	3,800	?	48.6		–	8.3	16.1	20.1	–	–	28.5
PSOE	23 Dec 1985	?	?	52.0		–	9.6	3.2	21.0	9.5	–	31.0
Sofemasa/La Vanguardia	16 Nov–1 Dec 1985	?	?	59.1		–	9.1	15.2	15.0	–	–	43.9
PSOE (Note: Undecided and/or abstentionists excluded.)	26 Jun 1985	?	55.0	61.5		–	9.6	5.6	18.4	7.6	–	43.1
AP	26 Jun 1985	?	?	40.9		–	3.5	3.1	29.4	3.3	–	11.5
1982 general election	28 Oct 1982	—N/a	78.8	60.5 (75)		5.9 (5)	6.2 (4)	2.3 (0)	22.2 (25)	1.3 (0)	–	38.3
1982 regional election	23 May 1982	—N/a	66.2	52.6; 66	17.0; 17	13.0; 15	8.5; 8	5.4; 3	–	–	–	35.6

== Results ==
=== Overall ===
← Summary of the 22 June 1986 Parliament of Andalusia election results →
Parties and alliances	Popular vote			Seats	
Parties and alliances	Votes	%	±pp	Total	+/−
Spanish Socialist Workers' Party of Andalusia (PSOE–A)	1,581,513	47.04	−5.56	60	−6
People's Coalition (AP–PDP–PL)^{1}	745,485	22.17	+5.17	28	+11
United Left–Assembly for Andalusia (IU–CA)^{2}	598,889	17.81	+9.24	19	+11
Andalusian Party (PA)	196,947	5.86	+0.47	2	−1
Democratic and Social Centre (CDS)	109,678	3.26	New	0	±0
Communists' Unity Board (MUC)	50,886	1.51	New	0	±0
Socialist Party of the Andalusian People (PSPA)	26,560	0.79	New	0	±0
Democratic Reformist Party (PRD)	25,934	0.77	New	0	±0
Humanist Party (PH)	6,982	0.21	New	0	±0
Andalusian Liberation (LA)	5,996	0.18	New	0	±0
Falangist Movement of Spain (MFE)	809	0.02	−0.09	0	±0
Union of the Democratic Centre (UCD)	n/a	n/a	−13.03	0	−15
Blank ballots	12,294	0.37	+0.04		
Total	3,361,973			109	±0
Valid votes	3,361,973	98.51	−0.62		
Invalid votes	50,824	1.49	+0.62		
Votes cast / turnout	3,412,797	70.82	+4.63		
Abstentions	1,406,335	29.18	−4.63		
Registered voters	4,819,132				
Sources
Footnotes: ^{1} People's Coalition results are compared to People's Alliance–People's Democratic Party totals in the 1982 election.; ^{2} United Left–Assembly for Andalusia results are compared to the combined totals of Communist Party of Andalusia and Socialist Party in the 1982 election.

Popular vote
PSOE–A	47.04%
AP–PDP–PL	22.17%
IU–CA	17.81%
PA	5.86%
CDS	3.26%
MUC	1.51%
Others	1.97%
Blank ballots	0.37%

Seats
PSOE–A	55.05%
AP–PDP–PL	25.69%
IU–CA	17.43%
PA	1.83%

=== Distribution by constituency ===
Constituency	PSOE–A		CP		IU–CA		PA	
Constituency	%	S	%	S	%	S	%	S
Almería	45.6	7	26.5	3	12.6	1	3.1	−
Cádiz	51.8	9	19.1	3	11.4	2	10.3	1
Córdoba	35.6	5	21.1	3	32.8	5	4.3	−
Granada	45.0	7	27.0	4	14.5	2	2.7	−
Huelva	54.2	7	20.9	3	12.8	1	5.0	−
Jaén	49.1	7	26.8	4	15.7	2	2.7	−
Málaga	46.8	8	21.2	4	20.4	3	4.6	−
Seville	48.6	10	20.0	4	17.5	3	8.9	1
Total	47.0	60	22.2	28	17.8	19	5.9	2

== Aftermath ==
=== Government formation ===
Investiture; Nomination of José Rodríguez de la Borbolla (PSOE–A)
Ballot →	25 July 1986
Required majority →	55 out of 109
Yes: • PSOE–A (60)	60 / 109
No: • AP–PDP–PL (28); • IU–CA (18); • PA (2)	48 / 109
Abstentions	0 / 109
Absentees: • IU–CA (1)	1 / 109

== Bibliography ==
- Ley Orgánica 6/1981, de 30 de diciembre, de Estatuto de Autonomía para Andalucía (Organic Law 6/1981). Official State Gazette (in Spanish). 30 December 1981. BOE-A-1982-633.
- Ley 6/1983, de 21 de julio, del Gobierno y la Administración de la Comunidad Autónoma (Law 6/1983). Official State Gazette (in Spanish). 21 July 1983. BOE-A-1983-23960.
- Ley Orgánica 5/1985, de 19 de junio, del Régimen Electoral General (Organic Law 5/1985). Official State Gazette (in Spanish). 19 June 1985 [version as of 21 February 1986]. BOE-A-1985-11672.
- Ley 1/1986, de 2 de enero, Electoral de Andalucía (Law 1/1986). Official State Gazette (in Spanish). 2 January 1986 [version as of 14 January 1986]. BOE-A-1986-2788.
- Decreto del Presidente 73/1986, de 28 de abril, por el que se convocan Elecciones al Parlamento de Andalucía (PDF) (Decree 73/1986). Official Gazette of the Regional Government of Andalusia (in Spanish). 29 April 1986.
