= Toni Valero =

Spanish politician (born 1981)

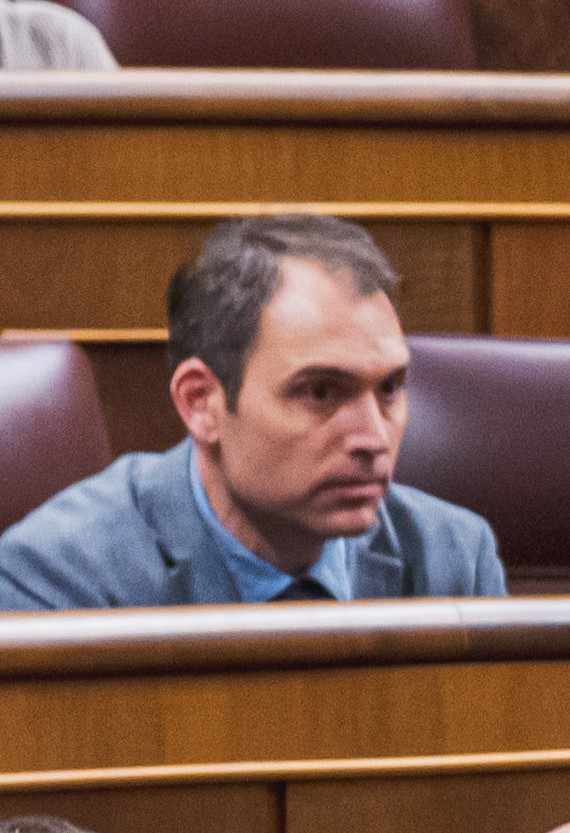
- Valero in 2024

Member of the Congress of Deputies
- Incumbent
- Assumed office 17 August 2023
- Constituency: Málaga

Personal details
- Born: 13 March 1981 (age 45)
- Party: United Left/The Greens–Assembly for Andalusia

Juan Antonio Valero Morales (born 13 March 1981) is a Spanish politician serving as a member of the Congress of Deputies since 2023. He has served as general coordinator of the United Left/The Greens–Assembly for Andalusia since 2019.
