= José Rodríguez de la Borbolla =

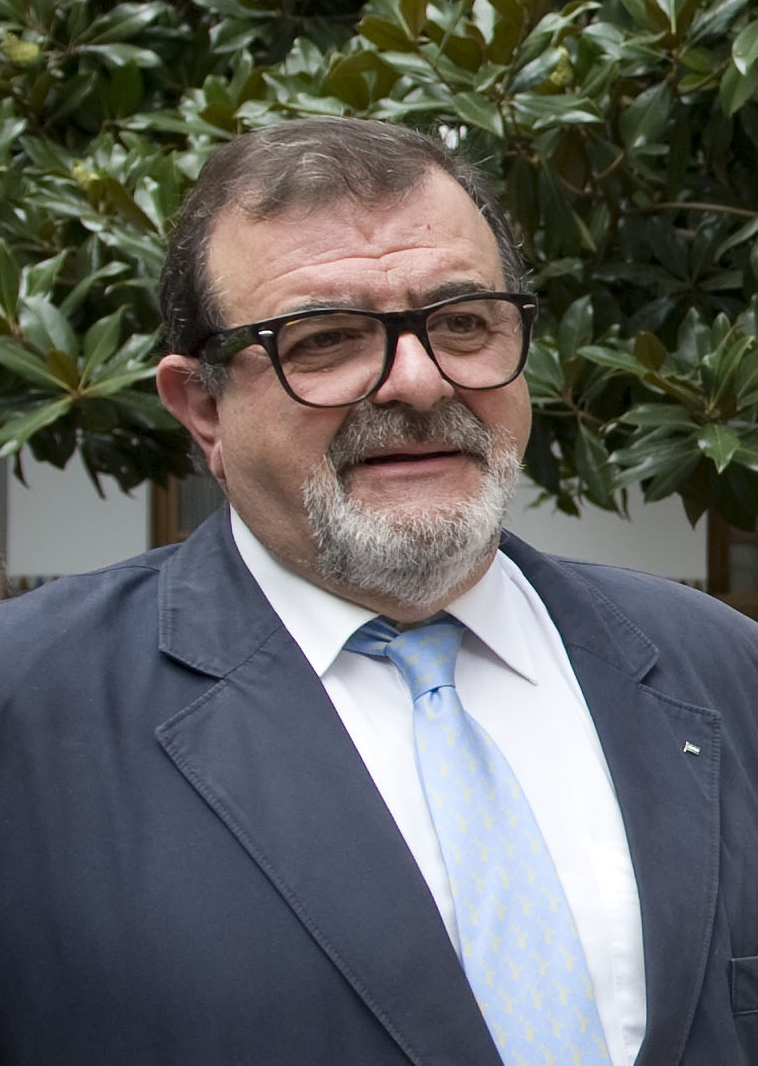

2nd President of the Regional Government of Andalusia
- In office 9 March 1984 – 25 July 1990
- Monarch: Juan Carlos I
- Deputy: José Miguel Salinas Moya
- Preceded by: Rafael Escuredo
- Succeeded by: Manuel Chaves

Secretary-General of the Spanish Socialist Workers' Party of Andalusia
- In office 1977–1988
- Preceded by: None
- Succeeded by: Carlos Sanjuán

Personal details
- Born: José María Rodríguez de la Borbolla Camoyán; 16 April 1947 (age 79) Seville, Andalusia, Spain
- Party: Spanish Socialist Workers' Party of Andalusia

José María Rodríguez de la Borbolla Camoyán (born 16 April 1947) is a Spanish politician and lawyer, member of the Spanish Socialist Workers' Party of Andalusia, who was President of Andalusia between 1984 and 1990.

== Legacy ==
In 2021 he donated his personal archive to the Fundación Centro de Estudios Andaluces for its digitalization.
