= Andalusian Liberation =

Andalusian Liberation Liberación Andaluza تحرير الأندلس Tahrir al-Andalus
- Leader: Abderramán Ortiz Molera; Yasser Calderón
- Founded: 1985
- Dissolved: 1989
- Merger of: Yama'a Islámica de Al-Andalus
- Ideology: Andalusian nationalism Independentism; Arabism; Islamic Andalusianism
- Political position: Syncretic
- Colors: Green; White
- Local Government: 3 / 9,027

Party flag

Andalusian Liberation (in Spanish: Liberación Andaluza; LA) was an Andalusian nationalist and independentist political party in Andalusia. In the 1986 Andalusian elections, LA got 5,996 votes (0.18%). The platform was dissolved in 1989, at least as a "political movement", because of its limited success.

== Ideology ==
LA mixed the ideas of Blas Infante with Islamic Neo-andalusism, represented by the Yama'a Islámica de Al-Andalus. LA proposed an official status for the Arabic language in the region. LA was openly independentist. LA thought that Islam was not a religion itself but the expression of the Andalusian cultural "genius and style".

LA was irredentist, advocating an expanded Andalusia comprising the current autonomous regions of Andalusia and Murcia, the Extremaduran province of Badajoz, the Sierra de Álcaraz in Castilla-La Mancha, the Portuguese Algarve and Gibraltar. LA was against the Capitulations of Granada and an alleged process of colonization of Andalusia by Spain.

== See also ==
- Andalusi Party – A modern Neo-Islamic Andalusist party
