= United Left/The Greens–Assembly for Andalusia =

United Left/The Greens–Assembly for Andalusia Izquierda Unida Los Verdes–Convocatoria por Andalucía
- General Coordinator: Toni Valero
- Founded: 1986
- Merger of: Communist Party of Andalusia; Izquierda Abierta; Communist Youth of Andalusia; Republican Left; Left and Progress; Socialist Alternative; Initiative for Andalusia; Independents; Unitarian Candidacy of Workers (1986-2015); Socialist Action Party (1986-2001); Progressive Federation (1986-1988); Carlist Party (1986-1987); Humanist Party (1986)
- Headquarters: C/Donantes de Sangre, s/n. Edificio Arrayán. 41020 Sevilla
- Membership (2013): 10,000
- Ideology: Socialism; Anticapitalism; Communism; Republicanism; Feminism; Federalism; Andalusian regionalism
- Political position: Left-wing
- National affiliation: United Left
- Regional affiliation: Adelante Andalucía (2018–2020); Por Andalucía (since 2022)
- Union affiliation: CCOO
- Congreso de los Diputados (Andalusian seats): 2 / 61 Inside Sumar.
- Parliament of Andalusia: 4 / 109 Inside Por Andalucía.
- Provincial deputations: 15 / 228
- Local government: 840 / 9,031

Website
- iuandalucia.org

United Left/The Greens–Assembly for Andalusia (Spanish: Izquierda Unida Los Verdes–Convocatoria por Andalucía. IULV–CA) is the Andalusian federation of the Spanish left wing political and social movement United Left. Toni Valero is the current General Coordinator. Since 2022 it is part of the electoral coalition Por Andalucía. The major member of this movement is the Communist Party of Andalusia (PCA, Andalusian federation of the Communist Party of Spain).

== History ==
Assembly for Andalusia appeared in 1984 as a proposal of the PCA to form a permanent coalition with other left-wing forces. The federation was created in 1986.

In February 2015 the Unitarian Candidacy of Workers (CUT), the second most important political party of IULV-CA at the time, left IULV-CA because of their disagreement with the "policy of pacts" with the PSOE.

== Electoral performance ==
=== Parliament of Andalusia ===
Parliament of Andalusia
Election	Leading candidate	Votes	%	Seats	+/–	Government
1986	Julio Anguita	598,889	17.81 (#3)	19 / 109	11 (Note: Compared to the Communist Party of Andalusia totals in the 1982 regional election.)	Opposition
1990	Luis Carlos Rejón	349,659	12.67 (#3)	11 / 109	8	Opposition
1994	Luis Carlos Rejón	689,815	19.14 (#3)	20 / 109	9	Opposition
1996	Luis Carlos Rejón	603,495	13.97 (#3)	14 / 109	7	Opposition
2000	Antonio Romero	327,435	8.11 (#3)	6 / 109	7	Opposition
2004	Diego Valderas	337,030	7.51 (#3)	6 / 109	0	Opposition
2008	Diego Valderas	317,562	7.06 (#3)	6 / 109	0	Opposition
2012	Diego Valderas	438,372	11.35 (#3)	12 / 109	6	Coalition (2012–2015)
2012	Diego Valderas	438,372	11.35 (#3)	12 / 109	6	Opposition (2015)
2015	Antonio Maíllo	274,426	6.89 (#5)	5 / 109	7	Opposition
2018 (Note: Within Forward Andalusia.)	Teresa Rodríguez	Within Adelante		5 / 109	0	Opposition
2022 (Note: Within For Andalusia.)	Inmaculada Nieto	Within PorA		1 / 109	4	Opposition
2026 (Note: Within For Andalusia.)	Antonio Maíllo	Within PorA		4 / 109	3	Opposition

=== Cortes Generales ===
Congress of Deputies
Date	Votes			Seats		Size
Date	#	%	±pp	#	±	Size
1986	273,008	8.1%	+1.9	3 / 60	2	3rd
1989	408,733	12.0%	+3.9	5 / 61	3	3rd
1993	484,753	12.1%	+0.1	4 / 61	1	3rd
1996	582,970	13.5%	+1.4	6 / 62	2	3rd
2000	315,891	7.8%	–5.7	3 / 62	3	3rd
2004	287,374	6.4%	–1.4	0 / 61	3	3rd
2008	230,335	5.1%	–1.3	0 / 61	0	3rd
2011	360,212	8.3%	+3.2	2 / 60	2	3rd
2015	257,019	5.8%	–2.5	0 / 61	2	5th
2016	792,008	18.6%	N/A	2 / 61	2	*
2019	651,160	14.3%	N/A	2 / 61	0	*

Senate
Date	Seats		Size
Date	#	±	Size
1986	0 / 32	0	3rd
1989	1 / 32	1	3rd
1993	0 / 32	1	3rd
1996	0 / 32	0	3rd
2000	0 / 32	0	3rd
2004	0 / 32	0	3rd
2008	0 / 32	0	3rd
2011	0 / 32	0	3rd
2015	0 / 32	0	5th
2016	0 / 32	0	*
2019	0 / 32	0	*

- * Within Unidos Podemos for Andalusia.

=== European Parliament ===
Date	Votes			Size
Date	#	%	±pp	Size
1987	333,924	10.8%	—	3rd
1989	232,023	9.0%	–1.8	4th
1994	613,999	17.0%	+8.0	3rd
1999	397,991	10.7%	–6.3	3rd
2004	125,303	5.0%	–5.7	3rd
2009	136.916	5.2%	+0.2	3rd
2014	311,201	11.6%	+6.4	3rd
2019				*

- * Within Unidas Podemos Cambiar Europa.
