= Results of the 1989 European Parliament election in Spain =

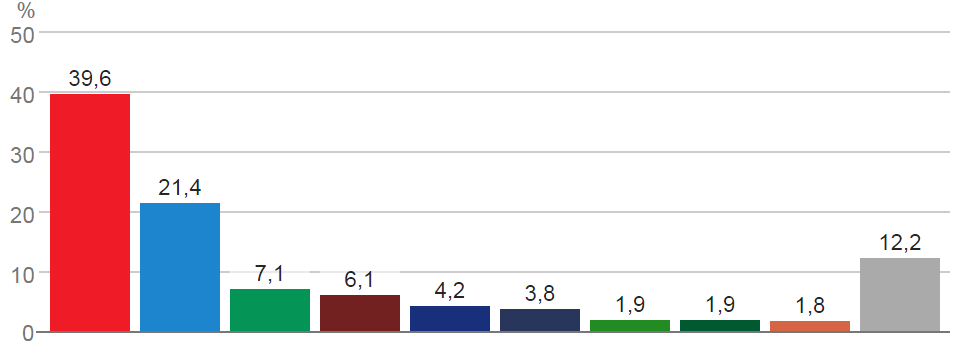
(Spain)	Main: 1989 European Parliament election in Spain
← 1987 15 June 1989 1994 →
Party		Votes	%	Seats
	PSOE	6,275,552	39.6%	27
	PP	3,395,015	21.4%	15
	CDS	1,133,429	7.1%	5
	IU	961,742	6.1%	4
	CiU	666,602	4.2%	2
	Ruiz-Mateos	608,560	3.8%	2
	CN	303,038	1.9%	1
	PA	295,047	1.9%	1
	IP	290,286	1.4%	1
	Others	1,929,199	12.2%	2
Total		15,858,470	100.0%	60

This article presents the results breakdown of the election to the European Parliament held in Spain on 15 June 1989. The following tables show detailed results in each of the country's 17 autonomous communities and in the autonomous cities of Ceuta and Melilla.

== Nationwide ==
← Summary of the 15 June 1989 European Parliament election results in Spain →
Parties and alliances	Popular vote			Seats	
Parties and alliances	Votes	%	±pp	Total	+/−
Spanish Socialist Workers' Party (PSOE)	6,275,552	39.57	+0.51	27	−1
People's Party (PP)^{1}	3,395,015	21.41	−4.13	15	−2
Democratic and Social Centre (CDS)	1,133,429	7.15	−3.11	5	−2
United Left (IU)	961,742	6.06	+0.81	4	+1
Convergence and Union (CiU)	666,602	4.20	−0.23	2	−1
Ruiz-Mateos Group (Ruiz-Mateos)^{2}	608,560	3.84	+3.23	2	+2
Nationalist Coalition (CN)^{3}	303,038	1.91	+0.16	1	+1
Andalusian Party (PA)	295,047	1.86	+0.90	1	+1
Left of the Peoples (IP)^{4}	290,286	1.83	+0.47	1	+1
Popular Unity (HB)	269,094	1.70	−0.17	1	±0
For the Europe of the Peoples (PEP)^{5}	238,909	1.51	−0.19	1	±0
Workers' Party of Spain–Communist Unity (PTE–UC)	197,095	1.24	+0.08	0	±0
Green List (Adhered to the European Greens) (LV)^{6}	164,524	1.04	+0.14	0	±0
The Ecologist Greens (LVE)	161,903	1.02	New	0	±0
Federation of Regional Parties (FPR)^{7}	151,835	0.96	−0.16	0	±0
Communist Party of the Peoples of Spain–PCC (PCPE–PCC)	79,970	0.50	New	0	±0
National Front (FN)	60,672	0.38	−0.26	0	±0
Spanish Vertex Ecological Development Revindication (VERDE)	58,686	0.37	New	0	±0
Social Democratic Coalition (CSD)	52,577	0.33	+0.20	0	±0
Green Alternative–Ecologist Movement of Catalonia (AV–MEC)	47,250	0.30	New	0	±0
Galician Nationalist Bloc (BNG)	46,052	0.29	+0.01	0	±0
Workers' Socialist Party–Revolutionary Workers' Party (PST–PORE)^{8}	38,683	0.24	−0.32	0	±0
Europe for Life (EPV)	30,252	0.19	New	0	±0
Spanish Phalanx of the CNSO (FE–JONS)	24,340	0.15	+0.03	0	±0
Free Catalonia (CLL)	19,774	0.12	New	0	±0
Humanist Party (PH)	19,356	0.12	±0.00	0	±0
Alliance for the Republic (AxR)^{9}	17,189	0.11	−0.02	0	±0
Asturian Nationalist Unity (UNA)	13,165	0.08	New	0	±0
Centrist Unity–Democratic Spanish Party (PED)	10,392	0.07	+0.02	0	±0
Andalusian Liberation (LA)	9,421	0.06	+0.01	0	±0
Initiative for a European Democracy (IDE)	8,789	0.06	New	0	±0
Carlist Party (PC)	8,477	0.05	New	0	±0
BACTERIA Electors' Group (BACTERIA)	0	0.00	New	0	±0
Blank ballots	200,794	1.27	+0.28		
Total	15,858,470			60	±0
Valid votes	15,858,470	98.98	+0.17		
Invalid votes	163,806	1.02	−0.17		
Votes cast / turnout	16,022,276	54.71	−13.81		
Abstentions	13,261,706	45.29	+13.81		
Registered voters	29,283,982				
Sources
Footnotes: ^{1} People's Party results are compared to the combined totals of People's Alliance and People's Democratic Party in the 1987 election.; ^{2} Ruiz-Mateos Group results are compared to Social Action totals in the 1987 election.; ^{3} Nationalist Coalition results are compared to the combined totals of Europeanist Union, Canarian Independent Groups and Nationalist Party of Castile and León in the 1987 election.; ^{4} Left of the Peoples (1989) results are compared to Left of the Peoples (1987) totals in the 1987 election.; ^{5} For the Europe of the Peoples results are compared to Coalition for the Europe of the Peoples totals in the 1987 election.; ^{6} Green List (Adhered to the European Greens) results are compared to the combined totals of The Greens and Confederation of the Greens in the 1987 election.; ^{7} Federation of Regional Parties results are compared to the combined totals of Valencian Union, United Extremadura and Regionalist Party of Cantabria in the 1987 election.; ^{8} Workers' Socialist Party–Revolutionary Workers' Party results are compared to the combined totals of Workers' Socialist Party and Revolutionary Workers' Party of Spain in the 1987 election.; ^{9} Alliance for the Republic results are compared to Internationalist Socialist Workers' Party totals in the 1987 election.

== Autonomous communities ==
=== Andalusia ===
← Summary of the 15 June 1989 European Parliament election results in Andalusia →
Parties and alliances	Popular vote		
Parties and alliances	Votes	%	±pp
Spanish Socialist Workers' Party (PSOE)	1,288,676	50.26	+1.99
People's Party (PP)^{1}	412,621	16.09	−5.67
Andalusian Party (PA)	267,790	10.44	+4.84
United Left–Assembly for Andalusia (IU–CA)	232,023	9.05	−1.76
Ruiz-Mateos Group (Ruiz-Mateos)^{2}	105,060	4.10	+3.04
Democratic and Social Centre (CDS)	103,982	4.06	−3.16
Workers' Party of Spain–Communist Unity (PTE–UC)	33,548	1.31	−0.06
Green List (Adhered to the European Greens) (LV)^{3}	19,607	0.76	+0.27
The Ecologist Greens (LVE)	14,106	0.55	New
Communist Party of the Peoples of Spain–PCC (PCPE–PCC)	10,196	0.40	New
National Front (FN)	7,764	0.30	−0.24
Spanish Vertex Ecological Development Revindication (VERDE)	5,950	0.23	New
Left of the Peoples (IP)^{4}	5,632	0.22	−0.03
Workers' Socialist Party–Revolutionary Workers' Party (PST–PORE)^{5}	4,997	0.19	−0.34
Social Democratic Coalition (CSD)	4,864	0.19	+0.09
Popular Unity (HB)	4,655	0.18	−0.14
Europe for Life (EPV)	4,536	0.19	New
Spanish Phalanx of the CNSO (FE–JONS)	2,956	0.12	+0.02
Andalusian Liberation (LA)	2,315	0.09	−0.02
Alliance for the Republic (AxR)^{6}	1,937	0.08	−0.03
Humanist Party (PH)	1,803	0.07	±0.00
Nationalist Coalition (CN)^{7}	1,687	0.07	−0.03
Federation of Regional Parties (FPR)^{8}	1,472	0.06	−0.05
Green Alternative–Ecologist Movement of Catalonia (AV–MEC)	1,469	0.06	New
Convergence and Union (CiU)	1,247	0.05	+0.01
Centrist Unity–Democratic Spanish Party (PED)	1,084	0.04	+0.01
Initiative for a European Democracy (IDE)	1,075	0.04	New
For the Europe of the Peoples (PEP)^{9}	1,020	0.04	−0.01
Asturian Nationalist Unity (UNA)	996	0.04	New
Galician Nationalist Bloc (BNG)	898	0.04	+0.01
Carlist Party (PC)	762	0.03	New
BACTERIA Electors' Group (BACTERIA)	0	0.00	New
Blank ballots	17,157	0.67	+0.02
Total	2,563,885		
Valid votes	2,563,885	99.20	+0.40
Invalid votes	20,680	0.80	−0.40
Votes cast / turnout	2,584,565	52.75	−13.05
Abstentions	2,315,072	47.25	+13.05
Registered voters	4,899,637		
Sources
Footnotes: ^{1} People's Party results are compared to the combined totals of People's Alliance and People's Democratic Party in the 1987 election.; ^{2} Ruiz-Mateos Group results are compared to Social Action totals in the 1987 election.; ^{3} Green List (Adhered to the European Greens) results are compared to the combined totals of The Greens and Confederation of the Greens in the 1987 election.; ^{4} Left of the Peoples (1989) results are compared to Left of the Peoples (1987) totals in the 1987 election.; ^{5} Workers' Socialist Party–Revolutionary Workers' Party results are compared to the combined totals of Workers' Socialist Party and Revolutionary Workers' Party of Spain in the 1987 election.; ^{6} Alliance for the Republic results are compared to Internationalist Socialist Workers' Party totals in the 1987 election.; ^{7} Nationalist Coalition results are compared to the combined totals of Europeanist Union, Canarian Independent Groups and Nationalist Party of Castile and León in the 1987 election.; ^{8} Federation of Regional Parties results are compared to the combined totals of Valencian Union and United Extremadura in the 1987 election.; ^{9} For the Europe of the Peoples results are compared to Coalition for the Europe of the Peoples totals in the 1987 election.

=== Aragon ===
← Summary of the 15 June 1989 European Parliament election results in Aragon →
Parties and alliances	Popular vote		
Parties and alliances	Votes	%	±pp
Spanish Socialist Workers' Party (PSOE)	209,358	41.64	+3.24
People's Party (PP)^{1}	133,858	26.62	+1.28
Democratic and Social Centre (CDS)	39,269	7.81	−3.56
United Left (IU)	31,716	6.31	+2.90
Ruiz-Mateos Group (Ruiz-Mateos)^{2}	27,763	5.52	+5.09
Workers' Party of Spain–Communist Unity (PTE–UC)	9,901	1.97	+0.63
Aragonese Union (Left of the Peoples) (UA–CHA)	8,563	1.70	New
Green List (Adhered to the European Greens) (LV)^{3}	5,219	1.04	+0.41
The Ecologist Greens (LVE)	5,135	1.02	New
Spanish Vertex Ecological Development Revindication (VERDE)	2,423	0.48	New
National Front (FN)	2,415	0.48	−0.19
Social Democratic Coalition (CSD)	2,107	0.42	+0.29
Federation of Regional Parties (FPR)^{4}	1,915	0.38	+0.31
Popular Unity (HB)	1,880	0.37	−0.19
Workers' Socialist Party–Revolutionary Workers' Party (PST–PORE)^{5}	1,547	0.31	−0.18
Communist Party of the Peoples of Spain–PCC (PCPE–PCC)	1,202	0.24	New
Europe for Life (EPV)	1,045	0.21	New
Humanist Party (PH)	835	0.17	+0.01
Spanish Phalanx of the CNSO (FE–JONS)	830	0.17	+0.07
Convergence and Union (CiU)	716	0.14	+0.04
Alliance for the Republic (AxR)^{6}	635	0.13	±0.00
Andalusian Party (PA)	561	0.11	+0.07
For the Europe of the Peoples (PEP)^{7}	494	0.10	±0.00
Green Alternative–Ecologist Movement of Catalonia (AV–MEC)	405	0.08	New
Centrist Unity–Democratic Spanish Party (PED)	393	0.08	+0.04
Carlist Party (PC)	391	0.08	New
Nationalist Coalition (CN)^{8}	334	0.07	−0.04
Initiative for a European Democracy (IDE)	303	0.06	New
Asturian Nationalist Unity (UNA)	252	0.05	New
Andalusian Liberation (LA)	223	0.04	+0.02
Galician Nationalist Bloc (BNG)	192	0.04	+0.01
BACTERIA Electors' Group (BACTERIA)	0	0.00	New
Blank ballots	10,931	2.17	+0.85
Total	502,811		
Valid votes	502,811	98.67	−0.05
Invalid votes	6,761	1.33	+0.05
Votes cast / turnout	509,572	54.26	−15.42
Abstentions	429,548	45.74	+15.42
Registered voters	939,120		
Sources
Footnotes: ^{1} People's Party results are compared to the combined totals of People's Alliance and People's Democratic Party in the 1987 election.; ^{2} Ruiz-Mateos Group results are compared to Social Action totals in the 1987 election.; ^{3} Green List (Adhered to the European Greens) results are compared to the combined totals of The Greens and Confederation of the Greens in the 1987 election.; ^{4} Federation of Regional Parties results are compared to the combined totals of Valencian Union and United Extremadura in the 1987 election.; ^{5} Workers' Socialist Party–Revolutionary Workers' Party results are compared to the combined totals of Workers' Socialist Party and Revolutionary Workers' Party of Spain in the 1987 election.; ^{6} Alliance for the Republic results are compared to Internationalist Socialist Workers' Party totals in the 1987 election.; ^{7} For the Europe of the Peoples results are compared to Coalition for the Europe of the Peoples totals in the 1987 election.; ^{8} Nationalist Coalition results are compared to the combined totals of Europeanist Union, Canarian Independent Groups and Nationalist Party of Castile and León in the 1987 election.

=== Asturias ===
← Summary of the 15 June 1989 European Parliament election results in Asturias →
Parties and alliances	Popular vote		
Parties and alliances	Votes	%	±pp
Spanish Socialist Workers' Party (PSOE)	197,650	41.48	−0.95
People's Party (PP)^{1}	107,443	22.55	−3.89
United Left (IU)	55,779	11.71	+1.90
Democratic and Social Centre (CDS)	53,890	11.31	−3.18
Ruiz-Mateos Group (Ruiz-Mateos)^{2}	14,992	3.15	+2.72
Workers' Party of Spain–Communist Unity (PTE–UC)	6,545	1.37	+0.25
Asturianist Party (Left of the Peoples) (PAS)	5,430	1.14	New
Asturian Nationalist Unity (UNA)	4,645	0.97	New
Green List (Adhered to the European Greens) (LV)^{3}	4,389	0.92	+0.33
The Ecologist Greens (LVE)	3,831	0.80	New
Popular Unity (HB)	2,631	0.55	−0.43
Communist Party of the Peoples of Spain–PCC (PCPE–PCC)	2,426	0.51	New
Social Democratic Coalition (CSD)	1,990	0.42	+0.27
Spanish Vertex Ecological Development Revindication (VERDE)	1,562	0.33	New
National Front (FN)	1,333	0.28	−0.22
Workers' Socialist Party–Revolutionary Workers' Party (PST–PORE)^{4}	1,224	0.26	−0.23
Spanish Phalanx of the CNSO (FE–JONS)	674	0.14	+0.02
Europe for Life (EPV)	561	0.12	New
Humanist Party (PH)	486	0.10	−0.01
Alliance for the Republic (AxR)^{6}	371	0.08	±0.00
Federation of Regional Parties (FPR)^{5}	322	0.07	+0.01
Green Alternative–Ecologist Movement of Catalonia (AV–MEC)	280	0.06	New
Centrist Unity–Democratic Spanish Party (PED)	254	0.05	+0.02
For the Europe of the Peoples (PEP)^{7}	239	0.05	−0.05
Nationalist Coalition (CN)^{8}	225	0.05	−0.06
Convergence and Union (CiU)	224	0.05	+0.01
Galician Nationalist Bloc (BNG)	204	0.04	+0.01
Andalusian Party (PA)	202	0.04	+0.01
Initiative for a European Democracy (IDE)	199	0.04	New
Carlist Party (PC)	176	0.04	New
Andalusian Liberation (LA)	99	0.02	−0.02
BACTERIA Electors' Group (BACTERIA)	0	0.00	New
Blank ballots	6,083	1.28	+0.32
Total	476,470		
Valid votes	476,470	98.67	+0.01
Invalid votes	6,404	1.33	−0.01
Votes cast / turnout	482,874	54.36	−12.40
Abstentions	405,469	45.64	+12.40
Registered voters	888,343		
Sources
Footnotes: ^{1} People's Party results are compared to the combined totals of People's Alliance and People's Democratic Party in the 1987 election.; ^{2} Ruiz-Mateos Group results are compared to Social Action totals in the 1987 election.; ^{3} Green List (Adhered to the European Greens) results are compared to the combined totals of The Greens and Confederation of the Greens in the 1987 election.; ^{4} Workers' Socialist Party–Revolutionary Workers' Party results are compared to the combined totals of Workers' Socialist Party and Revolutionary Workers' Party of Spain in the 1987 election.; ^{5} Federation of Regional Parties results are compared to the combined totals of Valencian Union and United Extremadura in the 1987 election.; ^{6} Alliance for the Republic results are compared to Internationalist Socialist Workers' Party totals in the 1987 election.; ^{7} For the Europe of the Peoples results are compared to Coalition for the Europe of the Peoples totals in the 1987 election.; ^{8} Nationalist Coalition results are compared to the combined totals of Europeanist Union, Canarian Independent Groups and Nationalist Party of Castile and León in the 1987 election.

=== Balearics ===
← Summary of the 15 June 1989 European Parliament election results in the Balearics →
Parties and alliances	Popular vote		
Parties and alliances	Votes	%	±pp
Spanish Socialist Workers' Party (PSOE)	84,465	35.58	+1.38
People's Party (PP)^{1}	78,052	32.88	−4.64
Democratic and Social Centre (CDS)	19,384	8.17	−3.72
Ruiz-Mateos Group (Ruiz-Mateos)^{2}	13,620	5.74	+4.97
Socialist Party of Mallorca (Left of the Peoples) (PSM)	9,923	4.18	+1.23
United Left (IU)	8,205	3.46	+1.25
The Ecologist Greens (LVE)	2,766	1.17	New
Green List (Adhered to the European Greens) (LV)^{3}	2,764	1.16	+0.48
Workers' Party of Spain–Communist Unity (PTE–UC)	1,602	0.67	+0.34
Communist Party of the Peoples of Spain–PCC (PCPE–PCC)	1,519	0.51	New
Social Democratic Coalition (CSD)	1,245	0.52	+0.39
Spanish Vertex Ecological Development Revindication (VERDE)	1,245	0.52	New
Convergence and Union (CiU)	1,174	0.49	+0.17
Andalusian Party (PA)	922	0.39	+0.30
Popular Unity (HB)	869	0.37	−0.07
Green Alternative–Ecologist Movement of Catalonia (AV–MEC)	851	0.36	New
Free Catalonia (CLL)	666	0.28	New
Workers' Socialist Party–Revolutionary Workers' Party (PST–PORE)^{4}	583	0.25	−0.11
National Front (FN)	536	0.23	±0.00
Spanish Phalanx of the CNSO (FE–JONS)	477	0.20	+0.11
For the Europe of the Peoples (PEP)	458	0.19	New
Europe for Life (EPV)	375	0.16	New
Alliance for the Republic (AxR)^{5}	343	0.14	+0.03
Humanist Party (PH)	274	0.12	+0.07
Federation of Regional Parties (FPR)^{6}	215	0.09	−0.02
Centrist Unity–Democratic Spanish Party (PED)	205	0.09	+0.04
Nationalist Coalition (CN)^{7}	199	0.08	−0.05
Andalusian Liberation (LA)	187	0.08	+0.04
Initiative for a European Democracy (IDE)	170	0.07	New
Asturian Nationalist Unity (UNA)	169	0.07	New
Carlist Party (PC)	164	0.07	New
Galician Nationalist Bloc (BNG)	147	0.06	+0.02
BACTERIA Electors' Group (BACTERIA)	0	0.00	New
Blank ballots	3,594	1.51	+0.38
Total	237,368		
Valid votes	237,368	98.81	+0.16
Invalid votes	2,858	1.19	−0.16
Votes cast / turnout	240,226	44.74	−22.02
Abstentions	296,711	55.26	+22.02
Registered voters	536,937		
Sources
Footnotes: ^{1} People's Party results are compared to the combined totals of People's Alliance and People's Democratic Party in the 1987 election.; ^{2} Ruiz-Mateos Group results are compared to Social Action totals in the 1987 election.; ^{3} Green List (Adhered to the European Greens) results are compared to the combined totals of The Greens and Confederation of the Greens in the 1987 election.; ^{4} Workers' Socialist Party–Revolutionary Workers' Party results are compared to the combined totals of Workers' Socialist Party and Revolutionary Workers' Party of Spain in the 1987 election.; ^{5} Alliance for the Republic results are compared to Internationalist Socialist Workers' Party totals in the 1987 election.; ^{6} Federation of Regional Parties results are compared to the combined totals of Valencian Union and United Extremadura in the 1987 election.; ^{7} Nationalist Coalition results are compared to the combined totals of Europeanist Union, Canarian Independent Groups and Nationalist Party of Castile and León in the 1987 election.

=== Basque Country ===
← Summary of the 15 June 1989 European Parliament election results in the Basque Country →
Parties and alliances	Popular vote		
Parties and alliances	Votes	%	±pp
Basque Nationalist Party (Nationalist Coalition) (EAJ/PNV)	201,809	20.95	+1.56
Popular Unity (HB)	184,362	19.14	−0.46
Socialist Party of the Basque Country (PSE–PSOE)	175,776	18.25	−0.80
Basque Solidarity (Europe of the Peoples) (EA)	125,227	13.00	−3.06
Basque Country Left (Left of the Peoples) (EE)	94,733	9.84	+0.12
People's Party (PP)^{1}	73,254	7.61	+0.25
Democratic and Social Centre (CDS)	26,241	2.72	−1.16
United Left (IU–EB)	17,017	1.77	+0.79
Ruiz-Mateos Group (Ruiz-Mateos)^{2}	13,798	1.43	+1.31
Workers' Party of Spain–Communist Unity (PTE–UC)	9,114	0.95	+0.17
The Ecologist Greens (LVE)	8,011	0.83	New
Green List (Adhered to the European Greens) (LB)^{3}	5,262	0.55	+0.11
Social Democratic Coalition (CSD)	2,702	0.28	+0.19
Europe for Life (EPV)	2,478	0.26	New
Communist Party of the Peoples of Spain–PCC (PCPE–PCC)	1,914	0.20	New
Workers' Socialist Party–Revolutionary Workers' Party (PST–PORE)^{4}	1,727	0.18	−0.21
National Front (FN)	1,368	0.14	−0.07
Green Alternative–Ecologist Movement of Catalonia (AV–MEC)	1,276	0.13	New
Humanist Party (PH)	1,032	0.11	+0.04
Carlist Party (PC)	684	0.07	New
Alliance for the Republic (AxR)^{5}	645	0.07	−0.02
Spanish Phalanx of the CNSO (FE–JONS)	618	0.06	+0.01
Andalusian Party (PA)	588	0.06	+0.01
Federation of Regional Parties (FPR)^{6}	544	0.06	−0.07
Galician Nationalist Bloc (BNG)	539	0.06	+0.01
Convergence and Union (CiU)	444	0.05	+0.02
Centrist Unity–Democratic Spanish Party (PED)	444	0.05	+0.02
Andalusian Liberation (LA)	364	0.04	+0.02
Asturian Nationalist Unity (UNA)	361	0.04	New
Initiative for a European Democracy (IDE)	353	0.04	New
BACTERIA Electors' Group (BACTERIA)	0	0.00	New
Blank ballots	10,494	1.09	+0.14
Total	963,179		
Valid votes	963,179	99.14	+0.14
Invalid votes	8,376	0.86	−0.14
Votes cast / turnout	971,555	58.49	−8.80
Abstentions	689,518	41.51	+8.80
Registered voters	1,661,073		
Sources
Footnotes: ^{1} People's Party results are compared to the combined totals of People's Alliance and People's Democratic Party in the 1987 election.; ^{2} Ruiz-Mateos Group results are compared to Social Action totals in the 1987 election.; ^{3} Green List (Adhered to the European Greens) results are compared to the combined totals of The Greens and Confederation of the Greens in the 1987 election.; ^{4} Workers' Socialist Party–Revolutionary Workers' Party results are compared to the combined totals of Workers' Socialist Party and Revolutionary Workers' Party of Spain in the 1987 election.; ^{5} Alliance for the Republic results are compared to Internationalist Socialist Workers' Party totals in the 1987 election.; ^{6} Federation of Regional Parties results are compared to the combined totals of Valencian Union and United Extremadura in the 1987 election.

=== Canary Islands ===
← Summary of the 15 June 1989 European Parliament election results in the Canary Islands →
Parties and alliances	Popular vote		
Parties and alliances	Votes	%	±pp
Spanish Socialist Workers' Party (PSOE)	181,332	34.89	+2.19
People's Party (PP)^{1}	86,480	16.64	−3.26
Democratic and Social Centre (CDS)	83,942	16.15	−4.35
Canarian Independent Groups (Nationalist Coalition) (AIC)	57,932	11.15	−3.39
United Left–United Canarian Left (IU–ICU)	27,490	5.29	+0.83
Ruiz-Mateos Group (Ruiz-Mateos)^{2}	23,476	4.52	+3.74
Nationalist Canarian Assembly (Left of the Peoples) (ACN)	16,553	3.19	New
The Ecologist Greens (LVE)	4,959	0.95	New
Green List (Adhered to the European Greens) (LV)^{3}	4,643	0.89	−0.25
Social Democratic Coalition (CSD)	3,410	0.66	+0.44
Workers' Party of Spain–Communist Unity (PTE–UC)	3,153	0.61	+0.12
Popular Unity (HB)	2,715	0.52	−0.18
Communist Party of the Peoples of Spain–PCC (PCPE–PCC)	2,361	0.45	New
Spanish Vertex Ecological Development Revindication (VERDE)	2,146	0.41	New
Workers' Socialist Party–Revolutionary Workers' Party (PST–PORE)^{4}	2,108	0.41	−0.14
Europe for Life (EPV)	1,096	0.21	New
National Front (FN)	1,004	0.19	−0.04
Humanist Party (PH)	966	0.19	+0.07
Alliance for the Republic (AxR)^{5}	898	0.17	+0.04
Green Alternative–Ecologist Movement of Catalonia (AV–MEC)	804	0.15	New
Centrist Unity–Democratic Spanish Party (PED)	788	0.15	+0.08
Spanish Phalanx of the CNSO (FE–JONS)	787	0.15	+0.07
Andalusian Party (PA)	743	0.14	+0.01
Convergence and Union (CiU)	706	0.14	+0.06
Federation of Regional Parties (FPR)^{6}	662	0.13	±0.00
For the Europe of the Peoples (PEP)	644	0.12	New
Asturian Nationalist Unity (UNA)	627	0.12	New
Initiative for a European Democracy (IDE)	579	0.11	New
Galician Nationalist Bloc (BNG)	554	0.11	+0.05
Andalusian Liberation (LA)	456	0.09	+0.05
Carlist Party (PC)	435	0.08	New
BACTERIA Electors' Group (BACTERIA)	0	0.00	New
Blank ballots	5,226	1.01	−0.11
Total	519,675		
Valid votes	519,675	98.99	+0.26
Invalid votes	5,312	1.01	−0.26
Votes cast / turnout	524,987	49.49	−12.33
Abstentions	535,813	50.51	+12.33
Registered voters	1,060,800		
Sources
Footnotes: ^{1} People's Party results are compared to the combined totals of People's Alliance and People's Democratic Party in the 1987 election.; ^{2} Ruiz-Mateos Group results are compared to Social Action totals in the 1987 election.; ^{3} Green List (Adhered to the European Greens) results are compared to the combined totals of The Greens and Confederation of the Greens in the 1987 election.; ^{4} Workers' Socialist Party–Revolutionary Workers' Party results are compared to the combined totals of Workers' Socialist Party and Revolutionary Workers' Party of Spain in the 1987 election.; ^{5} Alliance for the Republic results are compared to Internationalist Socialist Workers' Party totals in the 1987 election.; ^{6} Federation of Regional Parties results are compared to the combined totals of Valencian Union and United Extremadura in the 1987 election.

=== Cantabria ===
← Summary of the 15 June 1989 European Parliament election results in Cantabria →
Parties and alliances	Popular vote		
Parties and alliances	Votes	%	±pp
Spanish Socialist Workers' Party (PSOE)	97,044	40.29	+4.01
People's Party (PP)^{1}	77,056	31.99	−5.76
Democratic and Social Centre (CDS)	16,847	6.99	−2.95
Ruiz-Mateos Group (Ruiz-Mateos)^{2}	10,465	4.34	+3.64
United Left (IU)	10,074	4.18	+0.83
Regionalist Party of Cantabria (Federation of Regional Parties) (FPR)	6,141	2.55	−2.36
Workers' Party of Spain–Communist Unity (PTE–UC)	3,157	1.31	+0.27
Green List (Adhered to the European Greens) (LV)^{3}	2,198	0.91	+0.40
The Ecologist Greens (LVE)	1,949	0.81	New
Left of the Peoples (IP)^{4}	1,864	0.77	−0.28
National Front (FN)	1,631	0.68	−0.51
Popular Unity (HB)	1,324	0.55	−0.14
Communist Party of the Peoples of Spain–PCC (PCPE–PCC)	1,092	0.45	New
Social Democratic Coalition (CSD)	947	0.39	+0.27
Spanish Phalanx of the CNSO (FE–JONS)	844	0.35	+0.10
Spanish Vertex Ecological Development Revindication (VERDE)	729	0.30	New
Workers' Socialist Party–Revolutionary Workers' Party (PST–PORE)^{5}	682	0.28	−0.23
Humanist Party (PH)	397	0.16	+0.02
Alliance for the Republic (AxR)^{6}	323	0.13	−0.05
Europe for Life (EPV)	302	0.13	New
Centrist Unity–Democratic Spanish Party (PED)	249	0.10	+0.06
Nationalist Coalition (CN)^{7}	211	0.09	−0.07
For the Europe of the Peoples (PEP)^{8}	184	0.08	−0.01
Andalusian Party (PA)	181	0.08	+0.05
Initiative for a European Democracy (IDE)	177	0.07	New
Green Alternative–Ecologist Movement of Catalonia (AV–MEC)	170	0.07	New
Convergence and Union (CiU)	151	0.06	+0.02
Asturian Nationalist Unity (UNA)	121	0.05	New
Galician Nationalist Bloc (BNG)	111	0.05	+0.02
Andalusian Liberation (LA)	110	0.05	+0.04
Carlist Party (PC)	97	0.04	New
BACTERIA Electors' Group (BACTERIA)	0	0.00	New
Blank ballots	4,040	1.68	+0.51
Total	240,868		
Valid votes	240,868	98.77	+0.02
Invalid votes	2,995	1.23	−0.02
Votes cast / turnout	243,863	60.53	−15.47
Abstentions	159,028	39.47	+15.47
Registered voters	402,891		
Sources
Footnotes: ^{1} People's Party results are compared to the combined totals of People's Alliance and People's Democratic Party in the 1987 election.; ^{2} Ruiz-Mateos Group results are compared to Social Action totals in the 1987 election.; ^{3} Green List (Adhered to the European Greens) results are compared to the combined totals of The Greens and Confederation of the Greens in the 1987 election.; ^{4} Left of the Peoples (1989) results are compared to Left of the Peoples (1987) totals in the 1987 election.; ^{5} Workers' Socialist Party–Revolutionary Workers' Party results are compared to the combined totals of Workers' Socialist Party and Revolutionary Workers' Party of Spain in the 1987 election.; ^{6} Alliance for the Republic results are compared to Internationalist Socialist Workers' Party totals in the 1987 election.; ^{7} Nationalist Coalition results are compared to the combined totals of Europeanist Union, Canarian Independent Groups and Nationalist Party of Castile and León in the 1987 election.; ^{8} For the Europe of the Peoples results are compared to Coalition for the Europe of the Peoples totals in the 1987 election.

=== Castile and León ===
← Summary of the 15 June 1989 European Parliament election results in Castile and León →
Parties and alliances	Popular vote		
Parties and alliances	Votes	%	±pp
Spanish Socialist Workers' Party (PSOE)	419,922	36.45	+1.34
People's Party (PP)^{1}	372,451	32.33	−5.54
Democratic and Social Centre (CDS)	151,902	13.18	−4.17
Ruiz-Mateos Group (Ruiz-Mateos)^{2}	46,298	4.02	+3.57
United Left (IU)	46,258	4.01	+1.49
Workers' Party of Spain–Communist Unity (PTE–UC)	14,860	1.29	+0.29
Green List (Adhered to the European Greens) (LV)^{3}	11,841	1.03	+0.19
The Ecologist Greens (LVE)	11,462	0.99	New
Left of the Peoples (IP)^{4}	7,431	0.64	+0.34
Social Democratic Coalition (CSD)	6,036	0.52	+0.36
National Front (FN)	5,471	0.47	−0.19
Nationalist Party of Castile and León (Nationalist Coalition) (PANCAL)	5,081	0.44	+0.13
Spanish Vertex Ecological Development Revindication (VERDE)	4,459	0.39	New
Workers' Socialist Party–Revolutionary Workers' Party (PST–PORE)^{5}	3,203	0.28	−0.13
Popular Unity (HB)	3,201	0.28	−0.05
Communist Party of the Peoples of Spain–PCC (PCPE–PCC)	3,176	0.28	New
Spanish Phalanx of the CNSO (FE–JONS)	2,334	0.20	+0.06
Europe for Life (EPV)	2,325	0.20	New
Alliance for the Republic (AxR)^{6}	1,867	0.16	+0.05
Federation of Regional Parties (FPR)^{7}	1,600	0.14	±0.00
Humanist Party (PH)	1,557	0.14	+0.03
Centrist Unity–Democratic Spanish Party (PED)	1,180	0.10	+0.05
For the Europe of the Peoples (PEP)^{8}	1,014	0.09	+0.01
Green Alternative–Ecologist Movement of Catalonia (AV–MEC)	1,000	0.09	New
Andalusian Party (PA)	905	0.08	+0.05
Convergence and Union (CiU)	846	0.07	+0.03
Initiative for a European Democracy (IDE)	837	0.07	New
Asturian Nationalist Unity (UNA)	820	0.07	New
Galician Nationalist Bloc (BNG)	697	0.06	+0.02
Carlist Party (PC)	581	0.05	New
Andalusian Liberation (LA)	512	0.04	+0.03
BACTERIA Electors' Group (BACTERIA)	0	0.00	New
Blank ballots	21,071	1.83	+0.39
Total	1,152,198		
Valid votes	1,152,198	98.45	+0.14
Invalid votes	18,135	1.55	−0.14
Votes cast / turnout	1,170,333	57.54	−15.53
Abstentions	863,458	42.46	+15.53
Registered voters	2,033,791		
Sources
Footnotes: ^{1} People's Party results are compared to the combined totals of People's Alliance and People's Democratic Party in the 1987 election.; ^{2} Ruiz-Mateos Group results are compared to Social Action totals in the 1987 election.; ^{3} Green List (Adhered to the European Greens) results are compared to the combined totals of The Greens and Confederation of the Greens in the 1987 election.; ^{4} Left of the Peoples (1989) results are compared to Left of the Peoples (1987) totals in the 1987 election.; ^{5} Workers' Socialist Party–Revolutionary Workers' Party results are compared to the combined totals of Workers' Socialist Party and Revolutionary Workers' Party of Spain in the 1987 election.; ^{6} Alliance for the Republic results are compared to Internationalist Socialist Workers' Party totals in the 1987 election.; ^{7} Federation of Regional Parties results are compared to the combined totals of Valencian Union and United Extremadura in the 1987 election.; ^{8} For the Europe of the Peoples results are compared to Coalition for the Europe of the Peoples totals in the 1987 election.

=== Castilla–La Mancha ===
← Summary of the 15 June 1989 European Parliament election results in Castilla–La Mancha →
Parties and alliances	Popular vote		
Parties and alliances	Votes	%	±pp
Spanish Socialist Workers' Party (PSOE)	364,506	48.28	+3.62
People's Party (PP)^{1}	220,591	29.22	−5.87
Democratic and Social Centre (CDS)	55,679	7.37	−2.84
United Left (IU)	40,712	5.39	+0.84
Ruiz-Mateos Group (Ruiz-Mateos)^{2}	22,643	3.00	+2.68
National Front (FN)	5,905	0.78	−0.72
Workers' Party of Spain–Communist Unity (PTE–UC)	5,427	0.72	+0.17
The Ecologist Greens (LVE)	4,677	0.62	New
Green List (Adhered to the European Greens) (LV)^{3}	4,463	0.59	+0.06
Left of the Peoples (IP)^{4}	2,836	0.38	+0.34
Social Democratic Coalition (CSD)	2,466	0.33	+0.26
Communist Party of the Peoples of Spain–PCC (PCPE–PCC)	2,450	0.32	New
Spanish Vertex Ecological Development Revindication (VERDE)	2,015	0.27	New
Spanish Phalanx of the CNSO (FE–JONS)	1,978	0.26	+0.07
Workers' Socialist Party–Revolutionary Workers' Party (PST–PORE)^{5}	1,617	0.21	−0.19
Popular Unity (HB)	1,024	0.14	−0.02
Europe for Life (EPV)	994	0.13	New
Federation of Regional Parties (FPR)^{6}	972	0.13	+0.06
Alliance for the Republic (AxR)^{7}	832	0.11	+0.03
Humanist Party (PH)	754	0.10	+0.01
Andalusian Party (PA)	590	0.08	+0.05
Convergence and Union (CiU)	490	0.06	+0.03
Centrist Unity–Democratic Spanish Party (PED)	481	0.06	+0.03
Green Alternative–Ecologist Movement of Catalonia (AV–MEC)	452	0.06	New
Nationalist Coalition (CN)^{8}	399	0.05	−0.02
For the Europe of the Peoples (PEP)^{9}	392	0.05	+0.02
Initiative for a European Democracy (IDE)	381	0.05	New
Andalusian Liberation (LA)	333	0.04	+0.02
Asturian Nationalist Unity (UNA)	324	0.04	New
Galician Nationalist Bloc (BNG)	320	0.04	+0.02
Carlist Party (PC)	298	0.04	New
BACTERIA Electors' Group (BACTERIA)	0	0.00	New
Blank ballots	8,022	1.06	+0.09
Total	755,023		
Valid votes	755,023	98.90	+0.08
Invalid votes	8,388	1.10	−0.08
Votes cast / turnout	763,411	59.78	−15.47
Abstentions	513,624	40.22	+15.47
Registered voters	1,277,035		
Sources
Footnotes: ^{1} People's Party results are compared to the combined totals of People's Alliance and People's Democratic Party in the 1987 election.; ^{2} Ruiz-Mateos Group results are compared to Social Action totals in the 1987 election.; ^{3} Green List (Adhered to the European Greens) results are compared to the combined totals of The Greens and Confederation of the Greens in the 1987 election.; ^{4} Left of the Peoples (1989) results are compared to Left of the Peoples (1987) totals in the 1987 election.; ^{5} Workers' Socialist Party–Revolutionary Workers' Party results are compared to the combined totals of Workers' Socialist Party and Revolutionary Workers' Party of Spain in the 1987 election.; ^{6} Federation of Regional Parties results are compared to the combined totals of Valencian Union and United Extremadura in the 1987 election.; ^{7} Alliance for the Republic results are compared to Internationalist Socialist Workers' Party totals in the 1987 election.; ^{8} Nationalist Coalition results are compared to the combined totals of Europeanist Union, Canarian Independent Groups and Nationalist Party of Castile and León in the 1987 election.; ^{9} For the Europe of the Peoples results are compared to Coalition for the Europe of the Peoples totals in the 1987 election.

=== Catalonia ===
← Summary of the 15 June 1989 European Parliament election results in Catalonia →
Parties and alliances	Popular vote		
Parties and alliances	Votes	%	±pp
Socialists' Party of Catalonia (PSC–PSOE)	865,506	36.36	−0.46
Convergence and Union (CiU)	655,339	27.53	−0.29
People's Party (PP)^{1}	204,624	8.60	−2.85
United Left–Initiative (IU–I)	131,658	5.53	+0.16
Democratic and Social Centre (CDS)	87,119	3.66	−1.98
Republican Left of Catalonia (For the Europe of the Nations) (ERC)	78,408	3.29	−0.41
Ruiz-Mateos Group (Ruiz-Mateos)^{2}	68,613	2.88	+2.40
Green Alternative–Ecologist Movement of Catalonia (AV–MEC)	34,489	1.45	New
PCPE–Party of the Communists of Catalonia (PCPE–PCC)	33,948	1.43	New
The Ecologist Greens (LVE)	30,490	1.28	New
Green List (Adhered to the European Greens) (LLV)^{3}	29,009	1.22	−0.32
Workers' Party of Spain–Communist Unity (PTE–UC)	18,637	0.78	−0.03
Free Catalonia (CLl)	16,885	0.71	New
Agreement of Left Nationalists (Left of the Peoples) (ENE)	16,032	0.67	−0.15
Popular Unity (HB)	15,427	0.65	−0.66
Spanish Vertex Ecological Development Revindication (VERDE)	11,200	0.47	New
Andalusian Party (PA)	10,866	0.46	+0.28
Workers' Socialist Party–Revolutionary Workers' Party (PST–PORE)^{4}	7,113	0.30	−0.56
National Front (FN)	6,012	0.25	−0.11
Social Democratic Coalition (CSD)	5,912	0.25	+0.09
Europe for Life (EPV)	3,208	0.13	New
Humanist Party (PH)	3,046	0.13	−0.04
Spanish Phalanx of the CNSO (FE–JONS)	2,674	0.11	+0.02
Alliance for the Republic (AxR)^{5}	2,345	0.10	−0.14
Andalusian Liberation (LA)	1,999	0.08	+0.01
Centrist Unity–Democratic Spanish Party (PED)	1,935	0.08	±0.00
Nationalist Coalition (CN)^{6}	1,553	0.07	−0.17
Galician Nationalist Bloc (BNG)	1,504	0.06	−0.01
Initiative for a European Democracy (IDE)	1,432	0.06	New
Federation of Regional Parties (FPR)^{7}	1,371	0.06	−0.15
Asturian Nationalist Unity (UNA)	1,189	0.05	New
Carlist Party (PC)	1,052	0.04	New
BACTERIA Electors' Group (BACTERIA)	0	0.00	New
Blank ballots	29,875	1.26	+0.31
Total	2,380,470		
Valid votes	2,380,470	99.20	+0.06
Invalid votes	19,167	0.80	−0.06
Votes cast / turnout	2,399,637	51.53	−16.41
Abstentions	2,257,306	48.47	+16.41
Registered voters	4,656,943		
Sources
Footnotes: ^{1} People's Party results are compared to the combined totals of People's Alliance and People's Democratic Party in the 1987 election.; ^{2} Ruiz-Mateos Group results are compared to Social Action totals in the 1987 election.; ^{3} Green List (Adhered to the European Greens) results are compared to the combined totals of The Greens and Confederation of the Greens in the 1987 election.; ^{4} Workers' Socialist Party–Revolutionary Workers' Party results are compared to the combined totals of Workers' Socialist Party and Revolutionary Workers' Party of Spain in the 1987 election.; ^{5} Alliance for the Republic results are compared to Internationalist Socialist Workers' Party totals in the 1987 election.; ^{6} Nationalist Coalition results are compared to the combined totals of Europeanist Union, Canarian Independent Groups and Nationalist Party of Castile and León in the 1987 election.; ^{7} Federation of Regional Parties results are compared to the combined totals of Valencian Union and United Extremadura in the 1987 election.

=== Extremadura ===
← Summary of the 15 June 1989 European Parliament election results in Extremadura →
Parties and alliances	Popular vote		
Parties and alliances	Votes	%	±pp
Spanish Socialist Workers' Party (PSOE)	266,500	54.79	+4.85
People's Party (PP)^{1}	105,886	21.77	−5.03
Democratic and Social Centre (CDS)	41,820	8.60	−2.26
United Left (IU)	23,798	4.89	+0.18
Ruiz-Mateos Group (Ruiz-Mateos)^{2}	11,975	2.46	+2.21
United Extremadura (Federation of Regional Parties) (EU)	11,343	2.33	−1.11
Workers' Party of Spain–Communist Unity (PTE–UC)	2,927	0.60	−0.02
Green List (Adhered to the European Greens) (LV)^{3}	2,689	0.55	+0.08
The Ecologist Greens (LVE)	2,479	0.51	New
Communist Party of the Peoples of Spain–PCC (PCPE–PCC)	2,026	0.42	New
Social Democratic Coalition (CSD)	1,572	0.32	+0.24
Workers' Socialist Party–Revolutionary Workers' Party (PST–PORE)^{4}	1,140	0.23	−0.27
Left of the Peoples (IP)^{5}	1,036	0.21	+0.07
National Front (FN)	974	0.20	−0.15
Spanish Phalanx of the CNSO (FE–JONS)	963	0.20	+0.03
Spanish Vertex Ecological Development Revindication (VERDE)	944	0.19	New
Popular Unity (HB)	704	0.14	−0.06
Europe for Life (EPV)	581	0.12	New
Alliance for the Republic (AxR)^{6}	464	0.10	+0.03
Andalusian Party (PA)	346	0.07	+0.03
Humanist Party (PH)	278	0.06	−0.01
Green Alternative–Ecologist Movement of Catalonia (AV–MEC)	275	0.06	New
Convergence and Union (CiU)	236	0.05	+0.02
Centrist Unity–Democratic Spanish Party (PED)	220	0.05	+0.03
For the Europe of the Peoples (PEP)^{7}	213	0.04	±0.00
Initiative for a European Democracy (IDE)	196	0.04	New
Asturian Nationalist Unity (UNA)	193	0.04	New
Andalusian Liberation (LA)	170	0.03	+0.02
Galician Nationalist Bloc (BNG)	166	0.03	±0.00
Carlist Party (PC)	155	0.03	New
Nationalist Coalition (CN)^{8}	153	0.03	−0.03
BACTERIA Electors' Group (BACTERIA)	0	0.00	New
Blank ballots	3,953	0.81	+0.06
Total	486,375		
Valid votes	486,375	99.00	−0.02
Invalid votes	4,917	1.00	+0.02
Votes cast / turnout	491,292	60.36	−13.89
Abstentions	322,641	39.64	+13.89
Registered voters	813,933		
Sources
Footnotes: ^{1} People's Party results are compared to the combined totals of People's Alliance and People's Democratic Party in the 1987 election.; ^{2} Ruiz-Mateos Group results are compared to Social Action totals in the 1987 election.; ^{3} Green List (Adhered to the European Greens) results are compared to the combined totals of The Greens and Confederation of the Greens in the 1987 election.; ^{4} Workers' Socialist Party–Revolutionary Workers' Party results are compared to the combined totals of Workers' Socialist Party and Revolutionary Workers' Party of Spain in the 1987 election.; ^{5} Left of the Peoples (1989) results are compared to Left of the Peoples (1987) totals in the 1987 election.; ^{6} Alliance for the Republic results are compared to Internationalist Socialist Workers' Party totals in the 1987 election.; ^{7} For the Europe of the Peoples results are compared to Coalition for the Europe of the Peoples totals in the 1987 election.; ^{8} Nationalist Coalition results are compared to the combined totals of Europeanist Union, Canarian Independent Groups and Nationalist Party of Castile and León in the 1987 election.

=== Galicia ===
← Summary of the 15 June 1989 European Parliament election results in Galicia →
Parties and alliances	Popular vote		
Parties and alliances	Votes	%	±pp
People's Party (PP)^{1}	313,124	33.48	−10.07
Socialists' Party of Galicia (PSdG–PSOE)	309,019	33.05	+3.44
Democratic and Social Centre (CDS)	62,947	6.73	−3.52
Ruiz-Mateos Group (Ruiz-Mateos)^{2}	40,603	4.34	+3.39
Galician Nationalist Bloc (BNG)	38,968	4.17	+0.47
Galician Socialist Party–Galician Left (Left of the Peoples) (PSG–EG)	31,229	3.34	+0.41
Galician Coalition (Nationalist Coalition) (CN)	28,556	3.05	New
United Left (IU)	18,587	1.99	+0.72
Galician Nationalist Party–Galicianist Party (Europe of the Peoples) (PNG–PG)	12,906	1.38	+0.38
Workers' Party of Spain–Communist Unity (PTE–UC)	11,794	1.26	+0.20
Green List (Adhered to the European Greens) (LV(G))^{3}	7,867	0.84	+0.29
The Ecologist Greens (LVE)	6,835	0.73	New
Social Democratic Coalition (CSD)	5,213	0.56	+0.32
Popular Unity (HB)	4,760	0.51	−0.08
Workers' Socialist Party–Revolutionary Workers' Party (PST–PORE)^{4}	3,342	0.36	−0.50
Spanish Vertex Ecological Development Revindication (VERDE)	3,209	0.34	New
Communist Party of the Peoples of Spain–PCC (PCPE–PCC)	2,991	0.32	New
Europe for Life (EPV)	2,144	0.23	New
Alliance for the Republic (AxR)^{5}	2,034	0.22	−0.03
National Front (FN)	1,637	0.18	−0.05
Humanist Party (PH)	1,501	0.16	+0.01
Spanish Phalanx of the CNSO (FE–JONS)	1,407	0.15	+0.03
Federation of Regional Parties (FPR)^{6}	1,350	0.14	−0.01
Green Alternative–Ecologist Movement of Catalonia (AV–MEC)	1,195	0.13	New
Centrist Unity–Democratic Spanish Party (PED)	1,170	0.13	+0.05
Convergence and Union (CiU)	1,103	0.12	+0.04
Initiative for a European Democracy (IDE)	990	0.11	New
Andalusian Party (PA)	872	0.09	+0.04
Asturian Nationalist Unity (UNA)	859	0.09	New
Carlist Party (PC)	791	0.08	New
Andalusian Liberation (LA)	776	0.08	+0.03
BACTERIA Electors' Group (BACTERIA)	0	0.00	New
Blank ballots	15,363	1.64	+0.46
Total	935,142		
Valid votes	935,142	98.86	+0.15
Invalid votes	10,814	1.14	−0.15
Votes cast / turnout	945,956	42.74	−14.38
Abstentions	1,267,469	57.26	+14.38
Registered voters	2,213,425		
Sources
Footnotes: ^{1} People's Party results are compared to the combined totals of People's Alliance and People's Democratic Party in the 1987 election.; ^{2} Ruiz-Mateos Group results are compared to Social Action totals in the 1987 election.; ^{3} Green List (Adhered to the European Greens) results are compared to the combined totals of The Greens and Confederation of the Greens in the 1987 election.; ^{4} Workers' Socialist Party–Revolutionary Workers' Party results are compared to the combined totals of Workers' Socialist Party and Revolutionary Workers' Party of Spain in the 1987 election.; ^{5} Alliance for the Republic results are compared to Internationalist Socialist Workers' Party totals in the 1987 election.; ^{6} Federation of Regional Parties results are compared to the combined totals of Valencian Union and United Extremadura in the 1987 election.

=== La Rioja ===
← Summary of the 15 June 1989 European Parliament election results in La Rioja →
Parties and alliances	Popular vote		
Parties and alliances	Votes	%	±pp
Spanish Socialist Workers' Party (PSOE)	45,965	38.67	−1.29
People's Party (PP)^{1}	39,274	33.04	−6.58
Democratic and Social Centre (CDS)	9,005	7.58	−2.98
Ruiz-Mateos Group (Ruiz-Mateos)^{2}	5,236	4.41	+3.38
United Left (IU)	4,358	3.67	+1.96
Progressive Riojan Party (Federation of Regional Parties) (PRP)	2,463	2.07	New
Workers' Party of Spain–Communist Unity (PTE–UC)	1,533	1.29	+0.31
Left of the Peoples (IP)^{3}	1,469	1.24	+0.72
Green List (Adhered to the European Greens) (LV)^{4}	1,263	1.06	+0.31
The Ecologist Greens (LVE)	1,011	0.85	New
Popular Unity (HB)	733	0.62	−0.12
Social Democratic Coalition (CSD)	490	0.41	+0.26
National Front (FN)	449	0.38	−0.26
Spanish Vertex Ecological Development Revindication (VERDE)	425	0.36	New
Workers' Socialist Party–Revolutionary Workers' Party (PST–PORE)^{5}	324	0.27	−0.33
Communist Party of the Peoples of Spain–PCC (PCPE–PCC)	301	0.25	New
Europe for Life (EPV)	231	0.19	New
Alliance for the Republic (AxR)^{6}	192	0.16	−0.06
Spanish Phalanx of the CNSO (FE–JONS)	176	0.15	+0.04
Humanist Party (PH)	142	0.12	+0.06
For the Europe of the Peoples (PEP)^{7}	131	0.11	−0.02
Convergence and Union (CiU)	127	0.11	+0.06
Nationalist Coalition (CN)^{8}	125	0.11	−0.06
Carlist Party (PC)	102	0.09	New
Green Alternative–Ecologist Movement of Catalonia (AV–MEC)	96	0.08	New
Andalusian Party (PA)	90	0.08	+0.05
Centrist Unity–Democratic Spanish Party (PED)	77	0.06	+0.02
Initiative for a European Democracy (IDE)	59	0.05	New
Galician Nationalist Bloc (BNG)	58	0.05	+0.02
Andalusian Liberation (LA)	47	0.04	+0.02
Asturian Nationalist Unity (UNA)	41	0.03	New
BACTERIA Electors' Group (BACTERIA)	0	0.00	New
Blank ballots	2,864	2.41	+0.98
Total	118,857		
Valid votes	118,857	98.59	−0.05
Invalid votes	1,703	1.41	+0.05
Votes cast / turnout	120,560	58.64	−13.59
Abstentions	85,024	41.36	+13.59
Registered voters	205,584		
Sources
Footnotes: ^{1} People's Party results are compared to the combined totals of People's Alliance and People's Democratic Party in the 1987 election.; ^{2} Ruiz-Mateos Group results are compared to Social Action totals in the 1987 election.; ^{3} Left of the Peoples (1989) results are compared to Left of the Peoples (1987) totals in the 1987 election.; ^{4} Green List (Adhered to the European Greens) results are compared to the combined totals of The Greens and Confederation of the Greens in the 1987 election.; ^{5} Workers' Socialist Party–Revolutionary Workers' Party results are compared to the combined totals of Workers' Socialist Party and Revolutionary Workers' Party of Spain in the 1987 election.; ^{6} Alliance for the Republic results are compared to Internationalist Socialist Workers' Party totals in the 1987 election.; ^{7} For the Europe of the Peoples results are compared to Coalition for the Europe of the Peoples totals in the 1987 election.; ^{8} Nationalist Coalition results are compared to the combined totals of Europeanist Union, Canarian Independent Groups and Nationalist Party of Castile and León in the 1987 election.

=== Madrid ===
← Summary of the 15 June 1989 European Parliament election results in Madrid →
Parties and alliances	Popular vote		
Parties and alliances	Votes	%	±pp
Spanish Socialist Workers' Party (PSOE)	751,937	35.47	−4.91
People's Party (PP)^{1}	593,239	27.98	−2.89
Democratic and Social Centre (CDS)	197,681	9.32	−4.68
United Left (IU)	178,868	8.44	+3.29
Ruiz-Mateos Group (Ruiz-Mateos)^{2}	129,002	6.09	+5.46
Workers' Party of Spain–Communist Unity (PTE–UC)	44,821	2.11	−0.10
Green List (Adhered to the European Greens) (LV)^{3}	39,025	1.84	+0.69
The Ecologist Greens (LVE)	35,196	1.66	New
Left of the Peoples (IP)^{4}	33,172	1.56	+0.71
National Front (FN)	14,516	0.68	−0.52
Spanish Vertex Ecological Development Revindication (VERDE)	11,054	0.52	New
Popular Unity (HB)	6,986	0.33	−0.27
Andalusian Party (PA)	6,571	0.31	+0.24
Europe for Life (EPV)	5,515	0.26	New
Social Democratic Coalition (CSD)	5,424	0.26	+0.17
Communist Party of the Peoples of Spain–PCC (PCPE–PCC)	4,407	0.21	New
Spanish Phalanx of the CNSO (FE–JONS)	3,900	0.18	+0.01
Humanist Party (PH)	3,890	0.18	+0.01
Workers' Socialist Party–Revolutionary Workers' Party (PST–PORE)^{5}	3,629	0.17	−0.22
Regional Party of Madrid–Federation of Regional Parties (PRM)	3,538	0.17	New
Alliance for the Republic (AxR)^{6}	1,981	0.09	+0.03
Convergence and Union (CiU)	1,454	0.07	+0.01
For the Europe of the Peoples (PEP)^{7}	1,441	0.07	−0.02
Green Alternative–Ecologist Movement of Catalonia (AV–MEC)	1,406	0.07	New
Nationalist Coalition (CN)^{8}	1,383	0.07	−0.10
Asturian Nationalist Unity (UNA)	1,018	0.05	New
Initiative for a European Democracy (IDE)	928	0.04	New
Andalusian Liberation (LA)	841	0.04	+0.02
Galician Nationalist Bloc (BNG)	782	0.04	±0.00
Carlist Party (PC)	636	0.03	New
Centrist Unity–Democratic Spanish Party (PED)	621	0.03	−0.01
BACTERIA Electors' Group (BACTERIA)	0	0.00	New
Blank ballots	35,129	1.66	+0.59
Total	2,119,991		
Valid votes	2,119,991	98.96	+0.34
Invalid votes	22,345	1.04	−0.34
Votes cast / turnout	2,142,336	58.48	−11.45
Abstentions	1,521,310	41.52	+11.45
Registered voters	3,663,646		
Sources
Footnotes: ^{1} People's Party results are compared to the combined totals of People's Alliance and People's Democratic Party in the 1987 election.; ^{2} Ruiz-Mateos Group results are compared to Social Action totals in the 1987 election.; ^{3} Green List (Adhered to the European Greens) results are compared to the combined totals of The Greens and Confederation of the Greens in the 1987 election.; ^{4} Left of the Peoples (1989) results are compared to Left of the Peoples (1987) totals in the 1987 election.; ^{5} Workers' Socialist Party–Revolutionary Workers' Party results are compared to the combined totals of Workers' Socialist Party and Revolutionary Workers' Party of Spain in the 1987 election.; ^{6} Alliance for the Republic results are compared to Internationalist Socialist Workers' Party totals in the 1987 election.; ^{7} For the Europe of the Peoples results are compared to Coalition for the Europe of the Peoples totals in the 1987 election.; ^{8} Nationalist Coalition results are compared to the combined totals of Europeanist Union, Canarian Independent Groups and Nationalist Party of Castile and León in the 1987 election.

=== Murcia ===
← Summary of the 15 June 1989 European Parliament election results in Murcia →
Parties and alliances	Popular vote		
Parties and alliances	Votes	%	±pp
Spanish Socialist Workers' Party (PSOE)	208,277	48.18	+2.77
People's Party (PP)^{1}	115,595	26.74	−6.28
Democratic and Social Centre (CDS)	40,309	9.32	−1.96
United Left (IU)	26,089	6.03	+0.46
Ruiz-Mateos Group (Ruiz-Mateos)^{2}	12,668	2.93	+2.41
Green List (Adhered to the European Greens) (LV)^{3}	3,481	0.81	+0.25
The Ecologist Greens (LVE)	3,466	0.80	New
Workers' Party of Spain–Communist Unity (PTE–UC)	2,967	0.69	+0.32
Communist Party of the Peoples of Spain–PCC (PCPE–PCC)	2,275	0.53	New
Left of the Peoples (IP)^{4}	1,843	0.43	+0.23
Spanish Vertex Ecological Development Revindication (VERDE)	1,760	0.41	New
Social Democratic Coalition (CSD)	1,738	0.40	+0.29
National Front (FN)	1,390	0.32	−0.32
Workers' Socialist Party–Revolutionary Workers' Party (PST–PORE)^{5}	947	0.22	−0.10
Europe for Life (EPV)	779	0.18	New
Popular Unity (HB)	710	0.16	−0.10
Humanist Party (PH)	634	0.15	+0.04
Spanish Phalanx of the CNSO (FE–JONS)	555	0.13	+0.02
Alliance for the Republic (AxR)^{6}	449	0.10	+0.02
Andalusian Party (PA)	443	0.10	+0.07
Federation of Regional Parties (FPR)^{7}	362	0.08	−0.01
Green Alternative–Ecologist Movement of Catalonia (AV–MEC)	337	0.08	New
Convergence and Union (CiU)	301	0.07	+0.03
Centrist Unity–Democratic Spanish Party (PED)	273	0.06	+0.02
Initiative for a European Democracy (IDE)	248	0.06	New
For the Europe of the Peoples (PEP)^{8}	217	0.05	±0.00
Asturian Nationalist Unity (UNA)	206	0.05	New
Nationalist Coalition (CN)^{9}	203	0.05	−0.03
Galician Nationalist Bloc (BNG)	185	0.04	+0.02
Andalusian Liberation (LA)	184	0.04	+0.01
Carlist Party (PC)	144	0.03	New
BACTERIA Electors' Group (BACTERIA)	0	0.00	New
Blank ballots	3,287	0.76	−0.06
Total	432,322		
Valid votes	432,322	99.21	+0.42
Invalid votes	3,421	0.79	−0.42
Votes cast / turnout	435,743	58.71	−13.34
Abstentions	306,401	41.29	+13.34
Registered voters	742,144		
Sources
Footnotes: ^{1} People's Party results are compared to the combined totals of People's Alliance and People's Democratic Party in the 1987 election.; ^{2} Ruiz-Mateos Group results are compared to Social Action totals in the 1987 election.; ^{3} Green List (Adhered to the European Greens) results are compared to the combined totals of The Greens and Confederation of the Greens in the 1987 election.; ^{4} Left of the Peoples (1989) results are compared to Left of the Peoples (1987) totals in the 1987 election.; ^{5} Workers' Socialist Party–Revolutionary Workers' Party results are compared to the combined totals of Workers' Socialist Party and Revolutionary Workers' Party of Spain in the 1987 election.; ^{6} Alliance for the Republic results are compared to Internationalist Socialist Workers' Party totals in the 1987 election.; ^{7} Federation of Regional Parties results are compared to the combined totals of Valencian Union and United Extremadura in the 1987 election.; ^{8} For the Europe of the Peoples results are compared to Coalition for the Europe of the Peoples totals in the 1987 election.; ^{9} Nationalist Coalition results are compared to the combined totals of Europeanist Union, Canarian Independent Groups and Nationalist Party of Castile and León in the 1987 election.

=== Navarre ===
← Summary of the 15 June 1989 European Parliament election results in Navarre →
Parties and alliances	Popular vote		
Parties and alliances	Votes	%	±pp
Spanish Socialist Workers' Party (PSOE)	65,540	28.60	−0.89
People's Party (PP)^{1}	62,212	27.15	−1.48
Popular Unity (HB)	31,516	13.75	−0.63
Basque Solidarity (Europe of the Peoples) (EA)	14,280	6.23	−0.51
Democratic and Social Centre (CDS)	12,351	5.39	−4.38
Basque Country Left (Left of the Peoples) (EE)	8,550	3.73	+0.38
United Left (IU)	7,184	3.14	+1.78
Ruiz-Mateos Group (Ruiz-Mateos)^{2}	6,732	2.94	+2.60
Green List (Adhered to the European Greens) (LB)^{3}	2,741	1.20	+0.41
Basque Nationalist Party (Nationalist Coalition) (EAJ/PNV)	2,410	1.05	+0.14
The Ecologist Greens (LVE)	2,267	0.99	New
Europe for Life (EPV)	1,485	0.65	New
Carlist Party (PC)	1,226	0.54	New
Workers' Party of Spain–Communist Unity (PTE–UC)	1,130	0.49	+0.09
Spanish Vertex Ecological Development Revindication (VERDE)	929	0.41	New
Social Democratic Coalition (CSD)	900	0.39	+0.16
National Front (FN)	603	0.26	−0.17
Workers' Socialist Party–Revolutionary Workers' Party (PST–PORE)^{4}	556	0.24	−0.26
Communist Party of the Peoples of Spain–PCC (PCPE–PCC)	435	0.19	New
Green Alternative–Ecologist Movement of Catalonia (AV–MEC)	242	0.11	New
Humanist Party (PH)	240	0.10	+0.03
Spanish Phalanx of the CNSO (FE–JONS)	203	0.09	+0.01
Alliance for the Republic (AxR)^{5}	195	0.09	−0.05
Convergence and Union (CiU)	177	0.08	+0.02
Federation of Regional Parties (FPR)^{6}	159	0.07	−0.01
Asturian Nationalist Unity (UNA)	148	0.06	New
Centrist Unity–Democratic Spanish Party (PED)	144	0.06	+0.01
Andalusian Party (PA)	138	0.06	+0.01
Initiative for a European Democracy (IDE)	126	0.05	New
Galician Nationalist Bloc (BNG)	96	0.04	±0.00
Andalusian Liberation (LA)	89	0.04	+0.01
BACTERIA Electors' Group (BACTERIA)	0	0.00	New
Blank ballots	4,146	1.81	+0.16
Total	229,150		
Valid votes	229,150	98.70	−0.05
Invalid votes	3,008	1.30	+0.05
Votes cast / turnout	232,158	57.34	−15.22
Abstentions	172,713	42.66	+15.22
Registered voters	404,871		
Sources
Footnotes: ^{1} People's Party results are compared to the combined totals of People's Alliance and People's Democratic Party in the 1987 election.; ^{2} Ruiz-Mateos Group results are compared to Social Action totals in the 1987 election.; ^{3} Green List (Adhered to the European Greens) results are compared to the combined totals of The Greens and Confederation of the Greens in the 1987 election.; ^{4} Workers' Socialist Party–Revolutionary Workers' Party results are compared to the combined totals of Workers' Socialist Party and Revolutionary Workers' Party of Spain in the 1987 election.; ^{5} Alliance for the Republic results are compared to Internationalist Socialist Workers' Party totals in the 1987 election.; ^{6} Federation of Regional Parties results are compared to the combined totals of Valencian Union and United Extremadura in the 1987 election.

=== Valencian Community ===
← Summary of the 15 June 1989 European Parliament election results in the Valencian Community →
Parties and alliances	Popular vote		
Parties and alliances	Votes	%	±pp
Spanish Socialist Workers' Party (PSOE)	732,602	42.67	+0.59
People's Party (PP)^{1}	390,500	22.75	−2.58
Democratic and Social Centre (CDS)	128,508	7.49	−2.97
Valencian Union (Federation of Regional Parties) (UV)	116,575	6.79	−0.96
United Left of the Valencian Country (IU–EU)	101,425	5.91	+0.96
Ruiz-Mateos Group (Ruiz-Mateos)^{2}	54,227	3.16	+2.66
Valencian People's Union (Left of the Peoples) (IP)	43,893	2.56	New
Workers' Party of Spain–Communist Unity (PTE–UC)	25,880	1.51	−0.02
The Ecologist Greens (LVE)	22,924	1.34	New
Green List (Adhered to the European Greens) (LV)^{3}	17,743	1.03	−0.36
Spanish Vertex Ecological Development Revindication (VERDE)	8,636	0.50	New
National Front (FN)	7,509	0.44	−0.40
Communist Party of the Peoples of Spain–PCC (PCPE–PCC)	7,182	0.42	New
Popular Unity (HB)	5,566	0.32	−0.29
Social Democratic Coalition (CSD)	5,467	0.32	+0.21
Workers' Socialist Party–Revolutionary Workers' Party (PST–PORE)^{4}	3,875	0.23	−0.36
Spanish Phalanx of the CNSO (FE–JONS)	2,901	0.17	+0.02
Andalusian Party (PA)	2,748	0.16	+0.10
Europe for Life (EPV)	2,535	0.15	New
Green Alternative–Ecologist Movement of Catalonia (AV–MEC)	2,460	0.14	New
Free Catalonia (CLL)	2,223	0.13	New
Convergence and Union (CiU)	1,847	0.11	±0.00
Alliance for the Republic (AxR)^{5}	1,640	0.10	±0.00
For the Europe of the Peoples (PEP)^{6}	1,626	0.09	−0.05
Humanist Party (PH)	1,501	0.09	−0.01
Asturian Nationalist Unity (UNA)	1,172	0.07	New
Centrist Unity–Democratic Spanish Party (PED)	862	0.05	+0.01
Carlist Party (PC)	759	0.04	New
Nationalist Coalition (CN)^{7}	756	0.04	−0.11
Initiative for a European Democracy (IDE)	736	0.04	New
Andalusian Liberation (LA)	686	0.04	−0.02
Galician Nationalist Bloc (BNG)	619	0.04	±0.00
BACTERIA Electors' Group (BACTERIA)	0	0.00	New
Blank ballots	19,176	1.12	+0.30
Total	1,716,759		
Valid votes	1,716,759	98.96	+0.02
Invalid votes	18,113	1.04	−0.02
Votes cast / turnout	1,734,872	61.69	−12.77
Abstentions	1,077,502	38.31	+12.77
Registered voters	2,812,374		
Sources
Footnotes: ^{1} People's Party results are compared to the combined totals of People's Alliance and People's Democratic Party in the 1987 election.; ^{2} Ruiz-Mateos Group results are compared to Social Action totals in the 1987 election.; ^{3} Green List (Adhered to the European Greens) results are compared to the combined totals of The Greens and Confederation of the Greens in the 1987 election.; ^{4} Workers' Socialist Party–Revolutionary Workers' Party results are compared to the combined totals of Workers' Socialist Party and Revolutionary Workers' Party of Spain in the 1987 election.; ^{5} Alliance for the Republic results are compared to Internationalist Socialist Workers' Party totals in the 1987 election.; ^{6} For the Europe of the Peoples results are compared to Coalition for the Europe of the Peoples totals in the 1987 election.; ^{7} Nationalist Coalition results are compared to the combined totals of Europeanist Union, Canarian Independent Groups and Nationalist Party of Castile and León in the 1987 election.

== Autonomous cities ==
=== Ceuta ===
← Summary of the 15 June 1989 European Parliament election results in Ceuta →
Parties and alliances	Popular vote		
Parties and alliances	Votes	%	±pp
Spanish Socialist Workers' Party (PSOE)	6,196	39.91	−4.95
People's Party (PP)^{1}	5,068	32.64	−0.99
Democratic and Social Centre (CDS)	1,423	9.17	−1.71
Ruiz-Mateos Group (Ruiz-Mateos)^{2}	989	6.37	+5.38
Andalusian Party (PA)	313	2.02	+1.69
United Left (IU)	236	1.52	+0.63
The Ecologist Greens (LVE)	196	1.26	New
Green List (Adhered to the European Greens) (LV)^{3}	187	1.20	−0.42
Federation of Regional Parties (FPR)^{4}	128	0.82	+0.61
National Front (FN)	82	0.53	−0.19
Social Democratic Coalition (CSD)	62	0.40	+0.18
Workers' Socialist Party–Revolutionary Workers' Party (PST–PORE)^{5}	55	0.35	−0.03
Workers' Party of Spain–Communist Unity (PTE–UC)	49	0.32	−0.03
Left of the Peoples (IP)^{6}	46	0.30	+0.18
Spanish Phalanx of the CNSO (FE–JONS)	44	0.28	+0.08
Communist Party of the Peoples of Spain–PCC (PCPE–PCC)	33	0.21	New
Europe for Life (EPV)	30	0.19	New
Green Alternative–Ecologist Movement of Catalonia (AV–MEC)	28	0.18	New
Alliance for the Republic (AxR)^{7}	25	0.16	−0.06
Popular Unity (HB)	18	0.12	−0.03
Asturian Nationalist Unity (UNA)	16	0.10	New
Andalusian Liberation (LA)	15	0.10	−0.05
Carlist Party (PC)	15	0.10	New
For the Europe of the Peoples (PEP)^{8}	10	0.06	−0.02
Nationalist Coalition (CN)^{9}	9	0.06	−0.20
Humanist Party (PH)	9	0.06	−0.07
Galician Nationalist Bloc (BNG)	8	0.05	±0.00
Centrist Unity–Democratic Spanish Party (PED)	7	0.05	−0.02
Convergence and Union (CiU)	7	0.05	−0.07
BACTERIA Electors' Group (BACTERIA)	0	0.00	New
Blank ballots	222	1.43	−0.19
Total	15,526		
Valid votes	15,526	98.52	+0.38
Invalid votes	233	1.48	−0.38
Votes cast / turnout	15,759	39.77	−15.27
Abstentions	23,868	60.23	+15.27
Registered voters	39,627		
Sources
Footnotes: ^{1} People's Party results are compared to the combined totals of People's Alliance and People's Democratic Party in the 1987 election.; ^{2} Ruiz-Mateos Group results are compared to Social Action totals in the 1987 election.; ^{3} Green List (Adhered to the European Greens) results are compared to the combined totals of The Greens and Confederation of the Greens in the 1987 election.; ^{4} Federation of Regional Parties results are compared to the combined totals of Valencian Union and United Extremadura in the 1987 election.; ^{5} Workers' Socialist Party–Revolutionary Workers' Party results are compared to the combined totals of Workers' Socialist Party and Revolutionary Workers' Party of Spain in the 1987 election.; ^{6} Left of the Peoples (1989) results are compared to Left of the Peoples (1987) totals in the 1987 election.; ^{7} Alliance for the Republic results are compared to Internationalist Socialist Workers' Party totals in the 1987 election.; ^{8} For the Europe of the Peoples results are compared to Coalition for the Europe of the Peoples totals in the 1987 election.; ^{9} Nationalist Coalition results are compared to the combined totals of Europeanist Union, Canarian Independent Groups and Nationalist Party of Castile and León in the 1987 election.

=== Melilla ===
← Summary of the 15 June 1989 European Parliament election results in Melilla →
Parties and alliances	Popular vote		
Parties and alliances	Votes	%	±pp
Spanish Socialist Workers' Party (PSOE)	5,281	42.21	−3.66
People's Party (PP)^{1}	3,687	29.47	−6.76
Democratic and Social Centre (CDS)	1,130	9.03	+0.64
Melillan People's Union (Federation of Regional Parties) (FPR)	703	5.62	New
Ruiz-Mateos Group (Ruiz-Mateos)^{2}	400	3.20	+2.85
United Left (IU)	265	2.12	+1.14
Andalusian Party (PA)	178	1.42	+1.23
The Ecologist Greens (LVE)	143	1.14	New
Green List (Adhered to the European Greens) (LV)^{3}	133	1.06	+0.52
National Front (FN)	73	0.58	+0.06
Left of the Peoples (IP)^{4}	51	0.41	+0.17
Workers' Party of Spain–Communist Unity (PTE–UC)	50	0.40	+0.14
Communist Party of the Peoples of Spain–PCC (PCPE–PCC)	36	0.29	New
Social Democratic Coalition (CSD)	32	0.26	+0.20
Europe for Life (EPV)	32	0.26	New
Spanish Phalanx of the CNSO (FE–JONS)	19	0.15	+0.09
Andalusian Liberation (LA)	15	0.12	−0.04
Green Alternative–Ecologist Movement of Catalonia (AV–MEC)	15	0.12	New
Workers' Socialist Party–Revolutionary Workers' Party (PST–PORE)^{5}	14	0.11	−0.28
Popular Unity (HB)	13	0.10	−0.04
Convergence and Union (CiU)	13	0.10	+0.04
Nationalist Coalition (CN)^{6}	13	0.10	−0.06
Alliance for the Republic (AxR)^{7}	13	0.10	+0.05
Humanist Party (PH)	11	0.09	+0.04
Carlist Party (PC)	9	0.07	New
Asturian Nationalist Unity (UNA)	8	0.06	New
For the Europe of the Peoples (PEP)^{8}	5	0.04	+0.02
Centrist Unity–Democratic Spanish Party (PED)	5	0.04	±0.00
Galician Nationalist Bloc (BNG)	4	0.03	±0.00
BACTERIA Electors' Group (BACTERIA)	0	0.00	New
Blank ballots	161	1.29	+0.41
Total	12,512		
Valid votes	12,512	98.61	+0.05
Invalid votes	176	1.39	−0.05
Votes cast / turnout	12,688	39.89	−22.75
Abstentions	19,120	60.11	+22.75
Registered voters	31,808		
Sources
Footnotes: ^{1} People's Party results are compared to the combined totals of People's Alliance and People's Democratic Party in the 1987 election.; ^{2} Ruiz-Mateos Group results are compared to Social Action totals in the 1987 election.; ^{3} Green List (Adhered to the European Greens) results are compared to the combined totals of The Greens and Confederation of the Greens in the 1987 election.; ^{4} Left of the Peoples (1989) results are compared to Left of the Peoples (1987) totals in the 1987 election.; ^{5} Workers' Socialist Party–Revolutionary Workers' Party results are compared to the combined totals of Workers' Socialist Party and Revolutionary Workers' Party of Spain in the 1987 election.; ^{6} Nationalist Coalition results are compared to the combined totals of Europeanist Union, Canarian Independent Groups and Nationalist Party of Castile and León in the 1987 election.; ^{7} Alliance for the Republic results are compared to Internationalist Socialist Workers' Party totals in the 1987 election.; ^{8} For the Europe of the Peoples results are compared to Coalition for the Europe of the Peoples totals in the 1987 election.

== Congress of Deputies projection ==
A projection of European Parliament election results using electoral rules for the Congress of Deputies would have given the following seat allocation, as distributed per constituencies and regions: (Note: Note that results are compared with party totals in the preceding general election—held in June 1986—for consistency.)

Summary of the 15 June 1989 Congress of Deputies projected election results
Parties and alliances	Popular vote			Seats	
Parties and alliances	Votes	%	±pp	Total	+/−
Spanish Socialist Workers' Party (PSOE)	6,275,552	39.57	−4.49	187	+3
People's Party (PP)^{1}	3,395,015	21.41	−4.56	96	−9
Democratic and Social Centre (CDS)	1,133,429	7.15	−2.07	13	−6
United Left (IU)	961,742	6.06	+1.43	10	+3
Convergence and Union (CiU)	655,339	4.13	−0.89	17	−1
Ruiz-Mateos Group (Ruiz-Mateos)	608,560	3.84	New	2	+2
Andalusian Party (PA)	267,790	1.69	+1.22	5	+5
Popular Unity (HB)	215,878	1.36	+0.21	6	+1
Basque Nationalist Party (EAJ/PNV)	204,219	1.29	−0.24	5	−1
Basque Solidarity (EA)	139,507	0.88	New	3	+3
Valencian Union (UV)	116,575	0.74	+0.42	2	+1
Basque Country Left (EE)	103,283	0.65	+0.12	2	±0
Republican Left of Catalonia (ERC)	78,408	0.49	+0.07	1	+1
Canarian Independent Groups (AIC)	57,932	0.37	+0.04	1	±0
Galician Coalition (CG)	28,556	0.18	−0.22	0	−1
Regionalist Aragonese Party (PAR)	n/a	n/a	−0.36	0	−1
Others	1,415,891	8.93	—	0	±0
Blank ballots	200,794	1.27	+0.67		
Total	15,858,470			350	±0
Sources
Footnotes: ^{1} People's Party results are compared to People's Coalition totals in the 1986 election.

=== Constituencies ===

Summary of constituency results in the 15 June 1989 European Parliament election in Spain
Constituency	PSOE		PP		CDS		IU		CiU		RMateos		PA		HB		PNV		EA		UV		EE		ERC		AIC	
Constituency	%	S	%	S	%	S	%	S	%	S	%	S	%	S	%	S	%	S	%	S	%	S	%	S	%	S	%	S
La Coruña	36.0	5	29.1	4	7.1	−	2.4	−			5.2	−																
Álava	22.5	1	12.8	1	5.2	−	1.8	−			2.0	−			14.0	1	14.7	1	10.3	−			9.9	−				
Albacete	50.0	3	25.3	1	7.5	−	7.0	−			3.4	−																
Alicante	45.7	6	23.8	3	9.8	1	5.8	−			3.7	−									0.7	−						
Almería	52.8	4	18.2	1	8.6	−	6.1	−			3.3	−	5.9	−														
Asturias	41.5	5	22.5	2	11.3	1	11.7	1			3.1	−																
Ávila	27.9	1	29.4	1	30.1	1	2.6	−			2.8	−																
Badajoz	56.1	5	20.0	1	9.3	−	6.0	−			2.7	−																
Balearics	35.6	3	32.9	3	8.2	−	3.5	−			5.7	−																
Barcelona	37.4	15	8.5	3	3.7	1	6.1	2	25.8	10	2.9	−													3.0	1		
Biscay	18.1	2	7.6	1	2.7	−	2.1	−			1.7	−			17.4	2	26.3	3	9.8	1			9.2	1				
Burgos	32.2	2	35.1	2	10.8	−	4.5	−			5.6	−																
Cáceres	52.6	4	24.6	1	7.5	−	3.1	−			2.1	−																
Cádiz	46.8	6	11.5	1	3.5	−	6.0	−			6.1	−	19.6	2														
Cantabria	40.3	3	32.0	2	7.0	−	4.2	−			4.3	−																
Castellón	43.0	3	30.2	2	7.3	−	3.4	−			3.0	−									1.7	−						
Ceuta	39.9	1	32.6	−	9.2	−	1.5	−			6.4	−																
Ciudad Real	53.3	4	25.5	1	7.5	−	4.7	−			2.6	−																
Córdoba	48.4	4	15.1	1	4.4	−	15.1	1			3.8	−	10.0	1														
Cuenca	45.9	2	34.6	1	7.0	−	3.1	−			2.3	−																
Gipuzkoa	16.9	1	5.6	−	1.9	−	1.3	−			0.8	−			24.1	2	14.2	1	19.6	2			11.0	1				
Gerona	29.7	2	6.6	−	3.2	−	3.0	−	39.4	3	2.5	−													5.0	−		
Granada	48.6	5	19.9	2	4.8	−	7.7	−			5.0	−	5.9	−														
Guadalajara	37.5	1	37.8	2	7.2	−	5.6	−			3.5	−																
Huelva	56.3	4	14.7	1	3.6	−	5.1	−			4.8	−	9.9	−														
Huesca	44.8	2	25.4	1	9.6	−	5.3	−			4.1	−																
Jaén	52.7	4	21.5	2	4.2	−	9.1	−			2.4	−	5.6	−														
La Rioja	38.7	2	33.0	2	7.6	−	3.7	−			4.4	−																
Las Palmas	36.2	3	21.4	2	22.8	2	6.6	−			6.2	−															5.5	−
León	42.3	3	30.4	2	10.6	−	4.3	−			3.1	−																
Lérida	30.6	2	10.4	−	3.4	−	2.7	−	35.3	2	3.0	−													4.4	−		
Lugo	29.1	2	41.7	3	6.6	−	1.3	−			2.7	−																
Madrid	35.5	15	28.0	10	9.3	3	8.4	3			6.1	2																
Málaga	50.1	6	14.6	2	4.9	−	9.7	1			3.9	−	9.7	1														
Melilla	42.2	1	29.5	−	9.0	−	2.1	−			3.2	−																
Murcia	48.2	5	26.7	3	9.3	1	6.0	−			2.9	−																
Navarre	28.6	2	27.1	2	5.4	−	3.1	−			2.9	−			13.8	1	1.1	−	6.2	−			3.7	−				
Orense	31.8	2	38.6	3	5.2	−	1.2	−			2.7	−																
Palencia	36.8	1	37.3	2	8.5	−	3.9	−			3.9	−																
Pontevedra	31.6	4	33.2	4	7.0	−	2.1	−			4.7	−																
Salamanca	38.6	2	30.5	2	13.9	−	3.2	−			4.9	−																
Santa Cruz de Tenerife	38.3	4	14.2	1	11.8	1	4.7	−			3.5	−															18.2	1
Segovia	31.9	1	32.3	1	18.0	1	3.7	−			3.4	−																
Seville	50.8	8	15.4	2	2.1	−	9.6	1			3.6	−	12.2	1														
Soria	35.5	1	40.2	2	9.6	−	3.2	−			2.5	−																
Tarragona	35.9	3	10.5	−	3.8	−	4.1	−	27.9	2	3.4	−													3.5	−		
Teruel	43.8	2	34.2	1	8.2	−	2.7	−			1.9	−																
Toledo	47.1	3	30.1	2	7.4	−	5.9	−			3.2	−																
Valencia	41.0	8	20.7	4	6.3	1	6.5	1			2.9	−									11.0	2						
Valladolid	36.2	3	29.1	2	11.9	−	5.5	−			4.4	−																
Zamora	38.7	2	36.4	1	11.6	−	2.6	−			3.1	−																
Zaragoza	40.4	4	25.5	3	7.3	−	7.2	−			6.5	−																
Total	39.6	187	21.4	96	7.1	13	6.1	10	4.1	17	3.8	2	1.7	5	1.4	6	1.3	5	0.9	3	0.7	2	0.7	2	0.5	1	0.4	1

=== Regions ===

Summary of regional results in the 15 June 1989 European Parliament election in Spain
Region	PSOE		PP		CDS		IU		CiU		RMateos		PA		HB		PNV		EA		UV		EE		ERC		AIC	
Region	%	S	%	S	%	S	%	S	%	S	%	S	%	S	%	S	%	S	%	S	%	S	%	S	%	S	%	S
Andalusia	50.3	41	16.1	12	4.1	−	9.0	3			4.1	−	10.4	5														
Aragon	41.6	8	26.6	5	7.8	−	6.3	−			5.5	−																
Asturias	41.5	5	22.5	2	11.3	1	11.7	1			3.1	−																
Balearics	35.6	3	32.9	3	8.2	−	3.5	−			5.7	−																
Basque Country	18.2	4	7.6	2	2.7	−	1.8	−			1.4	−			19.1	5	21.0	5	13.0	3			9.8	2				
Canary Islands	34.9	7	16.6	3	16.2	3	5.3	−			4.5	−															11.1	1
Cantabria	40.3	3	32.0	2	7.0	−	4.2	−			4.3	−																
Castile and León	36.4	16	32.3	15	13.2	2	4.0	−			4.0	−																
Castilla–La Mancha	48.3	13	29.2	7	7.4	−	5.4	−			3.0	−																
Catalonia	36.4	22	8.6	3	3.7	1	5.5	2	27.5	17	2.9	−													3.3	1		
Ceuta	39.9	1	32.6	−	9.2	−	1.5	−			6.4	−																
Extremadura	54.8	9	21.8	2	8.6	−	4.9	−			2.5	−																
Galicia	33.0	13	33.5	14	6.7	−	2.0	−			4.3	−																
La Rioja	38.7	2	33.0	2	7.6	−	3.7	−			4.4	−																
Madrid	35.5	15	28.0	10	9.3	3	8.4	3			6.1	2																
Melilla	42.2	1	29.5	−	9.0	−	2.1	−			3.2	−																
Murcia	48.2	5	26.7	3	9.3	1	6.0	−			2.9	−																
Navarre	28.6	2	27.1	2	5.4	−	3.1	−			2.9	−			13.8	1	1.1	−	6.2	−			3.7	−				
Valencian Community	42.7	17	22.7	9	7.5	2	5.9	1			3.2	−									6.8	2						
Total	39.6	187	21.4	96	7.1	13	6.1	10	4.1	17	3.8	2	1.7	5	1.4	6	1.3	5	0.9	3	0.7	2	0.7	2	0.5	1	0.4	1
