= 1989 European Parliament election in Spain =

- 15 June 1989

All 60 Spanish seats in the European Parliament
- Opinion polls
- Registered: 29,283,982 ▲2.9%
- Turnout: 16,022,276 (54.7%) ▼13.8 pp
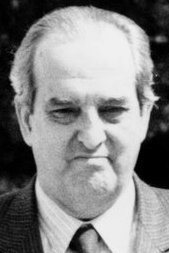

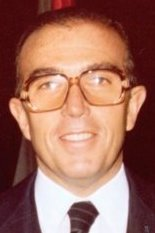

	First party	Second party	Third party
Leader	Fernando Morán	Marcelino Oreja	José Ramón Caso
Party	PSOE	PP	CDS
Alliance	SOC	ED (EPP)	LDR
Leader since	10 April 1987	20 January 1989	28 April 1989
Leader's seat	Spain	Spain	Spain
Last election	28 seats, 39.1%	17 seats, 25.5% (Note: Results for AP (24.6%, 17 seats) and PDP (0.9%, 0 seats) in the 1987 election.)	7 seats, 10.3%
Seats won	27	15	5
Seat change	▼1	▼2	▼2
Popular vote	6,275,552	3,395,015	1,133,429
Percentage	39.6%	21.4%	7.1%
Swing	▲0.5 pp	▼4.1 pp	▼3.2 pp
	Fourth party	Fifth party	Sixth party
Leader	Fernando Pérez Royo	Carles Gasòliba	José María Ruiz-Mateos
Party	IU	CiU	Ruiz-Mateos
Alliance	COM (EUL)	LDR; EPP	EDA
Leader since	25 April 1987	1 January 1986	7 May 1987
Leader's seat	Spain	Spain	Spain
Last election	3 seats, 5.3%	3 seats, 4.4%	0 seats, 0.6%
Seats won	4	2	2
Seat change	▲1	▼1	▲2
Popular vote	961,742	666,602	608,560
Percentage	6.1%	4.2%	3.8%
Swing	▲0.8 pp	▼0.2 pp	▲3.2 pp

An election was held in Spain on 15 June 1989 as part of the concurrent EU-wide election to the 3rd European Parliament. All 60 seats allocated to the Spanish constituency as per the 1985 Treaty of Accession were up for election.

The Spanish Socialist Workers' Party (PSOE) emerged as the largest party, followed by the newly amalgamated People's Party (PP) and Adolfo Suárez's Democratic and Social Centre—both of which scoring far below expectations—, as well as left-wing United Left (IU), which improved slightly on its 1987 performance. Ruiz-Mateos Group was the election surprise by winning two seats, with former Rumasa CEO and party leader José María Ruiz Mateos being elected as MEP—which granted him immunity from criminal prosecution, as he had been a fugitive from Spanish justice at the time of his election—. Registered turnout was a record low at the time for a nationwide election held in Spain, with abstention peaking at 45.3%.

The election was largely influenced by a recent string of PP–CDS agreements to vote no confidence motions on PSOE local governments, which included the Madrid city council and regional governments. This was said to have influenced the election's outcome, which had resulted in a sizeable PSOE win and a collapse in support for both the PP and CDS. His party's showing in this election was said to be one of the reasons that led Prime Minister Felipe González to call a snap general election for 29 October 1989.

== Overview ==
=== Electoral system ===
Voting for the European Parliament in Spain was based on universal suffrage, which comprised all Spanish nationals over 18 years of age with full political rights, provided that they had not been deprived of the right to vote by a final sentence, nor were legally incapacitated.

60 European Parliament seats were allocated to Spain as per the 1985 Treaty of Accession. All were elected in a single multi-member constituency—comprising the entire national territory—using the D'Hondt method and closed-list proportional voting, with no electoral threshold. The use of this electoral method resulted in an effective threshold depending on district magnitude and vote distribution.

The law did not provide for by-elections to fill vacant seats; instead, any vacancies arising after the proclamation of candidates and during the legislative term were filled by the next candidates on the party lists or, when required, by designated substitutes.

=== Outgoing delegation ===
The table below shows the composition of the Spanish delegation in the chamber at the time of the election call.

Delegation composition in May 1989
Groups	Parties	MEPs	
Groups	Parties	Seats	Total
Socialist Group	PSOE	29	29
European Democrats	PP	17	17
Communist and Allies	PCE	1	3
Communist and Allies	PASOC	1	3
Communist and Allies	PSUC	1	3
Liberal and Democratic Reformist Group	CDC	2	2
European People's Party	UDC	1	1
Rainbow Group	EA	1	1
Non-Inscrits	CDS	6	7
Non-Inscrits	HB	1	7

== Parties and candidates ==
The electoral law allowed for parties and federations registered in the interior ministry, alliances and groupings of electors to present lists of candidates. Parties and federations intending to form an alliance were required to inform the relevant electoral commission within 10 days of the election call. In order to be entitled to run, parties, federations, alliances and groupings of electors needed to secure the signature of at least 15,000 registered electors; this requirement could be lifted and replaced through the signature of at least 50 elected officials—deputies, senators, MEPs or members from the legislative assemblies of autonomous communities or from local city councils. Electors and elected officials were disallowed from signing for more than one list.

Below is a list of the main parties and alliances which contested the election:

Candidacy	Parties and alliances	Leading candidate	Ideology	Previous result		Ref.
Candidacy	Parties and alliances	Leading candidate	Ideology	Vote %	Seats	Ref.
PSOE	List: Spanish Socialist Workers' Party (PSOE); Socialists' Party of Catalonia (PSC)	Fernando Morán	Social democracy	39.1%	28	
PP	List: People's Party (PP); Navarrese People's Union (UPN); Centrists of Galicia (CdG)	Marcelino Oreja	Conservatism; Christian democracy	25.5%	15	
CDS	List: Democratic and Social Centre (CDS)	José Ramón Caso	Centrism; Liberalism	10.3%	7	
IU	List: Communist Party of Spain (PCE); Socialist Action Party (PASOC); Republican Left (IR); United Candidacy of Workers (CUT); Initiative for Catalonia (IC) – Unified Socialist Party of Catalonia (PSUC) – Agreement of Left Nationalists (ENE)	Fernando Pérez Royo	Socialism; Communism	5.3%	3	
CiU	List: Democratic Convergence of Catalonia (CDC); Democratic Union of Catalonia (UDC)	Carles Gasòliba	Catalan nationalism Centrism	4.4%	3	
HB	List: Popular Unity (HB) – People's Socialist Revolutionary Party (HASI) – Basque Nationalist Action (EAE/ANV) – Patriotic Socialist Committees (ASK)	Txema Montero	Basque independence Abertzale left Revolutionary socialism	1.9%	1	
PEP	List: Basque Solidarity (EA); Republican Left of Catalonia (ERC); Galician Nationalist Party (PNG)	Carlos Garaikoetxea	Left-wing nationalism	1.7% (Note: Results for CEP in the 1987 election.)	1	
CN	List: Basque Nationalist Party (EAJ/PNV); Canarian Independent Groups (AIC); Galician Coalition (CG); Nationalist Party of Castile and León (PANCAL)	Jon Gangoiti	Regionalism	1.7% (Note: Results for UE (1.2%, 0 seats), AIC (0.5, 0 seats) and PANCAL (0.1%, 0 seats) in the 1987 election.)	0	
IP	List: Basque Country Left (EE); Galician Socialist Party–Galician Left (PSG–EG); Valencian People's Union (UPV); Agreement of Left Nationalists (ENE); Socialist Party of Mallorca (PSM); Nationalist Canarian Assembly (ACN); Aragonese Union (UA–CHA); Socialist Party of Menorca (PSM); Asturianist Party (PAS)	Juan María Bandrés	Left-wing nationalism	1.4% (Note: Results for IP in the 1987 election.)	0	
FPR	List: Valencian Union (UV); Regionalist Party of Cantabria (PRC); United Extremadura (EU); Progressive Riojan Party (PRP); Melillan People's Union (UPM); Regional Party of Madrid (PRM); Regionalist Party of the Leonese Country (PREPAL); Union of Regionalist Parties of Castilla–La Mancha (UPRCLM)	Héctor Villalba	Regionalism	1.1% (Note: Results for UV (0.8%, 0 seats), EU (0.2%, 0 seats) and PRC (0.1%, 0 seats) in the 1987 election.)	0	
PA	List: Andalusian Party (PA)	Pedro Pacheco	Andalusian nationalism Social democracy	1.0%	0	
Ruiz-Mateos	List: Ruiz-Mateos Group (Ruiz-Mateos)	José María Ruiz-Mateos	Right-wing populism	0.6% (Note: Results for AS in the 1987 election.)	0	

== Opinion polls ==
The table below lists voting intention estimates in reverse chronological order, showing the most recent first and using the dates when the survey fieldwork was done, as opposed to the date of publication. Where the fieldwork dates are unknown, the date of publication is given instead. The highest percentage figure in each polling survey is displayed with its background shaded in the leading party's colour. If a tie ensues, this is applied to the figures with the highest percentages. The "Lead" column on the right shows the percentage-point difference between the parties with the highest percentages in a given poll. When available, seat projections are also displayed below the voting estimates in a smaller font.

Color key:

Exit poll

Polling firm/Commissioner	Fieldwork date	Sample size	Turnout	PSOE	AP	CDS	IU	CiU	HB	PEP	IP	CN	PTE–UC	PA	PDP	ARM	LV	PP	Lead
1989 EP election	15 Jun 1989	—N/a	54.7	39.6; 27	(Note: Within PP.)	7.1; 5	6.1; 4	4.2; 2	1.7; 1	1.5; 1	1.8; 1	1.9; 1	1.2; 0	1.9; 1		3.8; 2	1.0; 0	21.4; 15	18.2
PSOE	15 Jun 1989	39,000	54	39.3; 27/28		7.2; 4/5	6.4; 4	4.5; 3	1.6; 1	1.5; 1	1.7; 1	1.5; 1	–	2.2; 1		3.6; 2	–	21.1; 14	18.2
Opina/La Vanguardia	15 Jun 1989	?	54.4	38.0– 39.0; 26/27		7.0; 5	6.4; 4/5	4.4; 3	1.8; 1	1.5; 1	1.7; 1	1.9; 1	1.3; 0/1	1.9; 1		4.0; 2	1.2; 0/1	21.0– 22.0; 14/16	17.0
Sigma Dos/COPE	15 Jun 1989	?	?	35.0– 37.0; 25/26		7.0– 8.0; 5	7.0– 7.5; 5	4.3– 4.8; 3	1.8– 2.0; 1	1.4– 1.6; 1	1.7– 1.9; 1	1.4– 1.6; 1	–	2.0– 2.2; 1		2.5– 3.0; 1/2	–	22.5– 23.5; 15/16	12.5– 13.5
Demoscopia/Cadena SER	15 Jun 1989	?	?	36.4; 24/26		7.9; 5/6	6.7; 4/5	5.1; 3	2.3; 1	1.6; 1	? 1	? 1	–	? 1		4.0; 1/2	–	19.4; 15/16	17.0
Metra Seis/RNE	15 Jun 1989	?	?	36.0– 38.0; 24/26		8.5– 10.0; 5/7	5.5– 7.0; 4/5	4.5– 5.0; 3	1.3– 1.8; 0/1	1.5– 2.0; 0/1	2.0– 2.5; 1	1.5– 2.0; 0/1	–	2.0– 2.5; 1		2.0– 3.0; 1/2	–	24.0– 26.0; 16/18	12.0
OTR–IS/Interviú	9 Jun 1989	?	?	? 26/28		? 7/8	? 3/4	? 3	? 1/2	–	–	–	–	–		–	–	? 15/17	?
Opina/La Vanguardia	5–8 Jun 1989	1,800	50	37.8; 25/26		9.7; 6/7	6.3; 4	6.1; 4	–	1.9; 1	1.6; 1	? 1	–	–		–	–	25.5; 17	12.3
Demoscopia/El País	1–5 Jun 1989	2,500	50	35.3; 23/25		10.4; 6/7	6.8; 4	3.6; 2/3	1.9; 1	1.9; 1	2.5; 1/2	1.7; 1	–	2.7; 1/2		1.5; 0/1	? 0/1	27.7; 17/18	7.6
PP	3 Jun 1989	?	?	? 25		? 7	? 4	? 3/4	? 1	? 1	? 1	–	? 0/1	–		–	–	? 17	?
ICP–Research/Diario 16	30 May–3 Jun 1989	2,400	70	37.6; 24/27		8.3; 6/8	7.7; 5/7	4.6; 3	2.2; 1	0.7; 0/1	2.2; 1	1.1; 0/1	? 1	1.9; 1		–	? 1	19.7; 15/18	17.9
Gruppo/Colpisa	2 Jun 1989	1,000	57–62	33.4; 23/24		10.5; 7	7.2; 5	4.4; 3	1.8; 1	1.5; 1	1.5; 0/1	1.7; 1	–	1.3; 0/1		–	–	26.5; 18/19	6.9
Opina/La Vanguardia	15–26 May 1989	1,800	50	36.1; 25/26		12.4; 8/9	5.7; 4	6.1; 3/4	2.0; 1	? 0/1	2.3; 1	? 0/1	? 0/1	–		–	–	22.4; 16/17	13.7
Demoscopia/El País	17–21 May 1989	2,500	55	37.8; 25		11.1; 7	7.1; 4	3.7; 2	1.7; 1	2.2; 1	1.5; 1	3.0; 1	–	2.6; 1		–	–	25.5; 17	12.3
CIS	9–11 May 1989	4,459	?	41.6; 28		12.1; 8	6.6; 4	5.2; 3	–	–	–	1.2; 0	–	–		–	–	26.1; 17	15.5
Gruppo/Colpisa	26 Apr 1989	1,000	60–69	34.5; 23/24		11.7; 7/8	8.4; 5	4.2; 2/3	1.8; 1	1.6; 1	1.6; 1	1.7; 1	–	–		–	–	26.2; 17/18	8.3
CIS	22–24 Apr 1989	2,499	?	42.0		6.0– 9.0	5.0– 7.0	–	–	–	–	–	–	–		–	–	25.0– 28.0	14.0– 17.0
Opina/La Vanguardia	7–10 Apr 1989	1,610	?	34.8		15.0	5.9	6.7	–	–	–	–	–	–		–	–	27.6	7.2
CIS	6–10 Apr 1989	2,951	?	40.0– 42.0		9.0– 11.0	6.0– 7.0	–	–	–	–	–	–	–		–	–	23.0– 25.0	17.0
Gallup/EE	7 Mar 1989	?	?	? 22		? 7	? 5	? 3	? 0	? 1	? 1	? 0	–	? 1		–	–	? 20	?
1987 EP election	10 Jun 1987	—N/a	68.5	39.1; 28	24.6; 17	10.3; 7	5.3; 3	4.4; 3	1.9; 1	1.7; 1	1.4; 0	1.2; 0	1.2; 0	1.0; 0	0.9; 0	0.6; 0	0.6; 0	–	14.5

== Results ==
=== Overall ===
← Summary of the 15 June 1989 European Parliament election results in Spain →
Parties and alliances	Popular vote			Seats	
Parties and alliances	Votes	%	±pp	Total	+/−
Spanish Socialist Workers' Party (PSOE)	6,275,552	39.57	+0.51	27	−1
People's Party (PP)^{1}	3,395,015	21.41	−4.13	15	−2
Democratic and Social Centre (CDS)	1,133,429	7.15	−3.11	5	−2
United Left (IU)	961,742	6.06	+0.81	4	+1
Convergence and Union (CiU)	666,602	4.20	−0.23	2	−1
Ruiz-Mateos Group (Ruiz-Mateos)^{2}	608,560	3.84	+3.23	2	+2
Nationalist Coalition (CN)^{3}	303,038	1.91	+0.16	1	+1
Andalusian Party (PA)	295,047	1.86	+0.90	1	+1
Left of the Peoples (IP)^{4}	290,286	1.83	+0.47	1	+1
Popular Unity (HB)	269,094	1.70	−0.17	1	±0
For the Europe of the Peoples (PEP)^{5}	238,909	1.51	−0.19	1	±0
Workers' Party of Spain–Communist Unity (PTE–UC)	197,095	1.24	+0.08	0	±0
Green List (Adhered to the European Greens) (LV)^{6}	164,524	1.04	+0.14	0	±0
The Ecologist Greens (LVE)	161,903	1.02	New	0	±0
Federation of Regional Parties (FPR)^{7}	151,835	0.96	−0.16	0	±0
Communist Party of the Peoples of Spain–PCC (PCPE–PCC)	79,970	0.50	New	0	±0
National Front (FN)	60,672	0.38	−0.26	0	±0
Spanish Vertex Ecological Development Revindication (VERDE)	58,686	0.37	New	0	±0
Social Democratic Coalition (CSD)	52,577	0.33	+0.20	0	±0
Green Alternative–Ecologist Movement of Catalonia (AV–MEC)	47,250	0.30	New	0	±0
Galician Nationalist Bloc (BNG)	46,052	0.29	+0.01	0	±0
Workers' Socialist Party–Revolutionary Workers' Party (PST–PORE)^{8}	38,683	0.24	−0.32	0	±0
Europe for Life (EPV)	30,252	0.19	New	0	±0
Spanish Phalanx of the CNSO (FE–JONS)	24,340	0.15	+0.03	0	±0
Free Catalonia (CLL)	19,774	0.12	New	0	±0
Humanist Party (PH)	19,356	0.12	±0.00	0	±0
Alliance for the Republic (AxR)^{9}	17,189	0.11	−0.02	0	±0
Asturian Nationalist Unity (UNA)	13,165	0.08	New	0	±0
Centrist Unity–Democratic Spanish Party (PED)	10,392	0.07	+0.02	0	±0
Andalusian Liberation (LA)	9,421	0.06	+0.01	0	±0
Initiative for a European Democracy (IDE)	8,789	0.06	New	0	±0
Carlist Party (PC)	8,477	0.05	New	0	±0
BACTERIA Electors' Group (BACTERIA)	0	0.00	New	0	±0
Blank ballots	200,794	1.27	+0.28		
Total	15,858,470			60	±0
Valid votes	15,858,470	98.98	+0.17		
Invalid votes	163,806	1.02	−0.17		
Votes cast / turnout	16,022,276	54.71	−13.81		
Abstentions	13,261,706	45.29	+13.81		
Registered voters	29,283,982				
Sources
Footnotes: ^{1} People's Party results are compared to the combined totals of People's Alliance and People's Democratic Party in the 1987 election.; ^{2} Ruiz-Mateos Group results are compared to Social Action totals in the 1987 election.; ^{3} Nationalist Coalition results are compared to the combined totals of Europeanist Union, Canarian Independent Groups and Nationalist Party of Castile and León in the 1987 election.; ^{4} Left of the Peoples (1989) results are compared to Left of the Peoples (1987) totals in the 1987 election.; ^{5} For the Europe of the Peoples results are compared to Coalition for the Europe of the Peoples totals in the 1987 election.; ^{6} Green List (Adhered to the European Greens) results are compared to the combined totals of The Greens and Confederation of the Greens in the 1987 election.; ^{7} Federation of Regional Parties results are compared to the combined totals of Valencian Union, United Extremadura and Regionalist Party of Cantabria in the 1987 election.; ^{8} Workers' Socialist Party–Revolutionary Workers' Party results are compared to the combined totals of Workers' Socialist Party and Revolutionary Workers' Party of Spain in the 1987 election.; ^{9} Alliance for the Republic results are compared to Internationalist Socialist Workers' Party totals in the 1987 election.

Popular vote
PSOE	39.57%
PP	21.41%
CDS	7.15%
IU	6.06%
CiU	4.20%
Ruiz-Mateos	3.84%
CN	1.91%
PA	1.86%
IP	1.83%
HB	1.70%
PEP	1.51%
PTE–UC	1.24%
LV	1.04%
LVE	1.02%
Others	4.39%
Blank ballots	1.27%

Seats
PSOE	45.00%
PP	25.00%
CDS	8.33%
IU	6.67%
CiU	3.33%
Ruiz-Mateos	3.33%
CN	1.67%
PA	1.67%
IP	1.67%
HB	1.67%
PEP	1.67%

=== Maps ===
Vote winner strength by province.

Vote winner strength by autonomous community.

=== Distribution by European group ===
Summary of political group distribution in the 3rd European Parliament (1989–1994)
Groups	Parties	Seats	Total	%
Socialist Group (SOC)	Spanish Socialist Workers' Party (PSOE)	27	27	45.00
European People's Party (EPP)	People's Party (PP); Democratic Union of Catalonia (UDC)	15; 1	16	26.67
Liberal Democrat and Reform Party (LDR)	Democratic and Social Centre (CDS); Democratic Convergence of Catalonia (CDC)	5; 1	6	10.00
European United Left (EUL)	Communist Party of Spain (PCE); Initiative for Catalonia (IC); Socialist Action Party (PASOC)	2; 1; 1	4	6.67
Rainbow Group (RBW)	Basque Solidarity (EA); Andalusian Party (PA)	1; 1	2	3.33
The Green Group in the European Parliament (G)	Basque Country Left (EE)	1	1	1.67
Non-Inscrits (NI)	Ruiz-Mateos Group (Ruiz-Mateos); Popular Unity (HB); Basque Nationalist Party (EAJ/PNV)	2; 1; 1	4	6.67
Total		60	60	100.00

== Bibliography ==
- Ley Orgánica 5/1985, de 19 de junio, del Régimen Electoral General (Organic Law 5/1985). Official State Gazette (in Spanish). 19 June 1985 [version as of 3 April 1987]. BOE-A-1985-11672.
- Act concerning the election of the representatives of the Assembly by direct universal suffrage. Official Journal of the European Communities. 20 September 1976. 41976X1008(01).
- Treaty (signed on 12 June 1985) between the Kingdom of Belgium, the Kingdom of Denmark, the Federal Republic of Germany, the Hellenic Republic, the French Republic, Ireland, the Italian Republic, the Grand Duchy of Luxembourg, the Kingdom of the Netherlands, the United Kingdom of Great Britain and Northern Ireland (Member States of the European Communities) and the Kingdom of Spain and the Portuguese Republic concerning the accession of the Kingdom of Spain and the Portuguese Republic to the European Economic Community and to the European Atomic Energy Community. Official Journal of the European Communities. 15 November 1985. 11985I/TXT.
