= Nationalist Coalition (1989) =

Nationalist Coalition Coalición Nacionalista
- Abbreviation: CN
- Founded: 1989
- Dissolved: 1994
- Preceded by: Europeanist Union
- Succeeded by: Nationalist Coalition (1994)
- Ideology: Peripheral nationalism Regionalism
- European Parliament group: Rainbow Group; European People's Party

Nationalist Coalition (Spanish: Coalición Nacionalista, CN) was a Spanish electoral list in the European Parliament election in 1989 made up from centre-right peripheral nationalist parties. It was the successor of the 1987 Europeanist Union.

== Composition ==
Party	Scope
Basque Nationalist Party (EAJ/PNV)	Basque Country, Navarre
Canarian Independent Groups (AIC)	Canary Islands
Galician Coalition (CG)	Galicia
Nationalist Party of Castile and León (PANCAL)	Castile and León

== Electoral performance ==
=== European Parliament ===
European Parliament
Election	Vote	%	Score	Seats	+/–
1989	303,038	1.9	7th	1 / 60	1
