= Palencia (Congress of Deputies constituency) =

Electoral constituency in Spain

Coordinates: 42°25′N 4°30′W

- Congress of Deputies; Electoral constituency
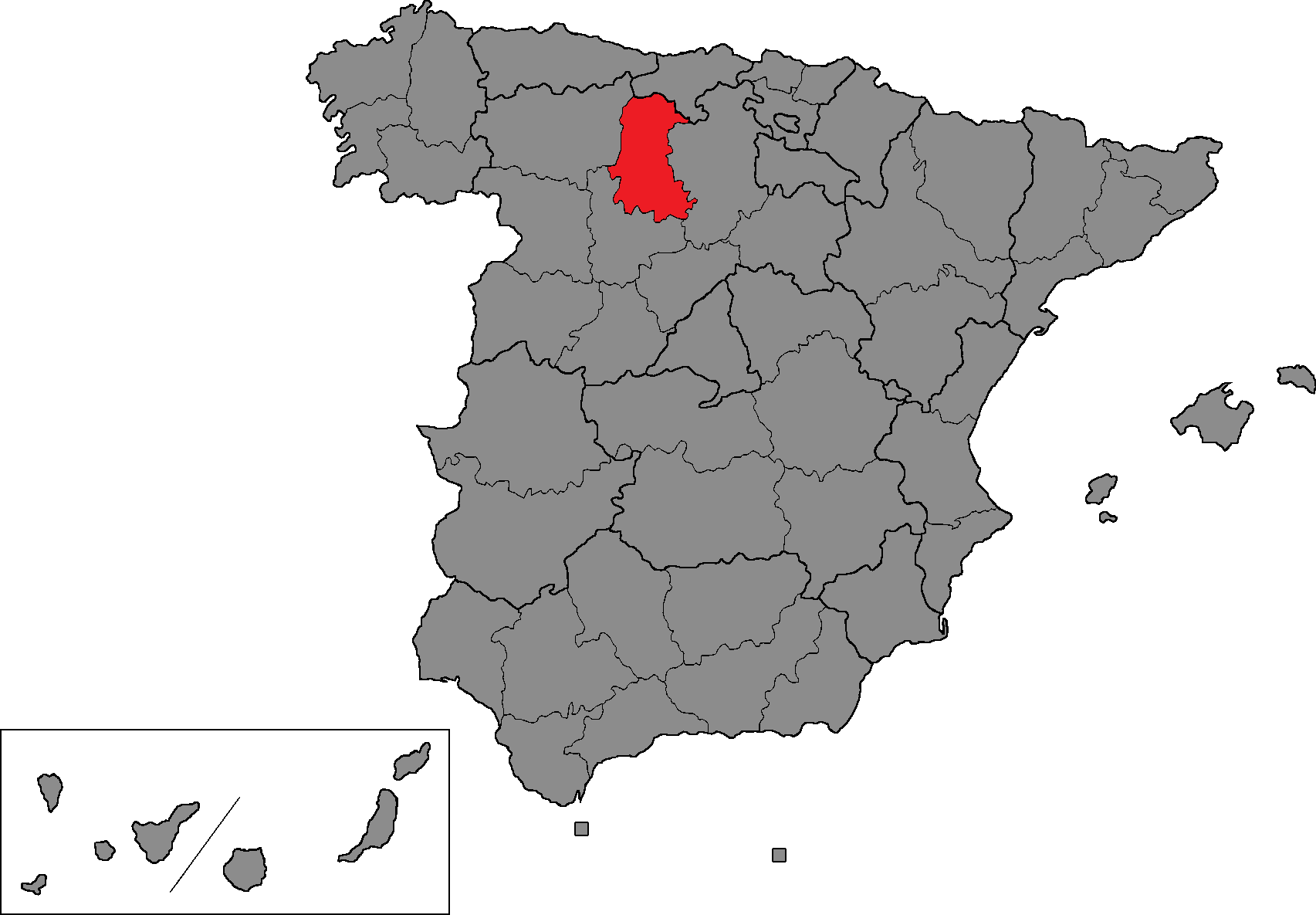
- Location of Palencia within Spain
- Province: Palencia
- Autonomous community: Castile and León
- Population: ▲158,115 (2024)
- Electorate: ▼137,642 (2023)
- Major settlements: Palencia

Current constituency
- Created: 1977
- Seats: 3
- Members: PP (2); PSOE (1)

Palencia is one of the 52 constituencies represented in the Congress of Deputies, the lower chamber of the Spanish parliament, the Cortes Generales. The constituency (whose boundaries correspond to those of the homonymous province) currently elects four deputies. The electoral system uses the D'Hondt method and closed-list proportional voting, with a minimum threshold of three percent.

== Electoral system ==
The constituency was created as per the Political Reform Law and was first contested in the 1977 general election. The Law provided for the provinces of Spain to be established as multi-member districts in the Congress of Deputies, with this regulation being maintained under the Spanish Constitution of 1978. Additionally, the Constitution requires for any modification of the provincial limits to be approved under an organic law, needing an absolute majority in the Cortes Generales.

Voting is based on universal suffrage, comprising all Spanish nationals over 18 years of age with full political rights, provided that they have not been deprived of the right to vote by a final sentence. The only exception was in 1977, when this was limited to nationals over 21 years of age and in full enjoyment of their political and civil rights. Amendments in 2011 required non-resident citizens to apply for voting, a system known as "begged" voting (Spanish: Voto rogado). which was abolished in 2022. Further, amendments in 2018 granted the right to vote to those legally incapacitated. The Congress of Deputies has a minimum of 300 and a maximum of 400 seats, with electoral provisions fixing its size at 350. Of these, 348 are elected in 50 multi-member constituencies corresponding to the provinces of Spain—each of which is assigned an initial minimum of two seats and the remaining 248 distributed in proportion to population—using the D'Hondt method and closed-list proportional voting, with a three percent-threshold of valid votes (including blank ballots) in each constituency. The remaining two seats are allocated to Ceuta and Melilla as single-member districts elected by plurality voting. The use of this electoral method may result in a higher effective threshold depending on district magnitude and vote distribution. The law does not provide for by-elections to fill vacant seats; instead, any vacancies arising after the proclamation of candidates and during the legislative term are filled by the next candidates on the party lists or, when required, by designated substitutes.

The electoral law allows for parties and federations registered in the interior ministry, alliances and groupings of electors to present lists of candidates. Parties and federations intending to form an alliance are required to inform the relevant electoral commission within 10 days of the election call—15 before 1985—whereas groupings of electors need to secure the signature of at least one percent of the electorate in the constituencies for which they seek election—one permille of the electorate, with a compulsory minimum of 500 signatures, until 1985—disallowing electors from signing for more than one list. Also since 2011, parties, federations or alliances that have not obtained a mandate in either chamber of the Cortes at the preceding election are required to secure the signature of at least 0.1 percent of electors in the aforementioned constituencies. Amendments in 2007 required a balanced composition of men and women in the electoral lists, so that candidates of either sex made up at least 40 percent of the total composition; further amendments in 2024 required the use of a zipper system.

== Deputies ==
Deputies 1977–present
Key to parties PSOE Cs UCD PP CP AP
Legislature	Election	Distribution
Constituent	1977	1 / 2
1st	1979	1 / 2
2nd	1982	2 / 1
3rd	1986	2 / 1
4th	1989	1 / 2
5th	1993	1 / 2
6th	1996	1 / 2
7th	2000	1 / 2
8th	2004	1 / 2
9th	2008	1 / 2
10th	2011	1 / 2
11th	2015	1 / 2
12th	2016	1 / 2
13th	2019 (Apr)	1 / 1 / 1
14th	2019 Nov)	1 / 2
15th	2023	1 / 2

== General elections ==
=== 2026 ===
Summary of the 29 November 2026 Congress of Deputies election results in Palencia
Parties and alliances	Popular vote			Seats	
Parties and alliances	Votes	%	±pp	Total	+/−
People's Party (PP)					
Spanish Socialist Workers' Party (PSOE)					
Vox (Vox)					
Broad Front (FA)^{1}			n/a		
We Can (Podemos)^{1}			n/a		
Workers' Front (FO)					
For a Fairer World (M+J)					
Communist Party of the Workers of Spain (PCTE)					
Spanish Phalanx of the CNSO (FE de las JONS)					
The Party is Over (SALF)			New		
Blank Seats to Leave Empty Seats (EB)			New		
Blank ballots					
Total				3	±0
Valid votes					
Invalid votes					
Votes cast / turnout					
Abstentions					
Registered voters	137,466				
Sources
Footnotes: ^{1} Within the Unite alliance in the 2023 election.

=== 2023 ===
Summary of the 23 July 2023 Congress of Deputies election results in Palencia
Parties and alliances	Popular vote			Seats	
Parties and alliances	Votes	%	±pp	Total	+/−
People's Party (PP)	40,709	41.98	+6.28	2	±0
Spanish Socialist Workers' Party (PSOE)	33,613	34.67	+1.42	1	±0
Vox (Vox)	12,504	12.90	–1.52	0	±0
Unite (Sumar)^{1}	5,877	6.06	–2.03	0	±0
Let's Go Palencia (VP)	1,917	1.98	New	0	±0
Empty Spain (España Vaciada)	384	0.40	New	0	±0
Alive Land Palencia Independent Group (GIPTV)	366	0.38	New	0	±0
Animalist Party with the Environment (PACMA)^{2}	295	0.30	–0.31	0	±0
Workers' Front (FO)	139	0.14	New	0	±0
For a Fairer World (PUM+J)	99	0.10	–0.12	0	±0
Communist Party of the Workers of Spain (PCTE)	80	0.08	–0.03	0	±0
Spanish Phalanx of the CNSO (FE de las JONS)	71	0.07	New	0	±0
Zero Cuts (Recortes Cero)	42	0.04	–0.23	0	±0
Walking Together (CJ)	33	0.03	New	0	±0
Blank ballots	833	0.86	–0.20		
Total	96,962			3	±0
Valid votes	96,962	98.86	+0.15		
Invalid votes	1,117	1.14	–0.15		
Votes cast / turnout	98,079	71.26	+2.60		
Abstentions	39,563	28.74	–2.60		
Registered voters	137,642				
Sources
Footnotes: ^{1} Unite results are compared to United We Can totals in the November 2019 election.; ^{2} Animalist Party with the Environment results are compared to Animalist Party Against Mistreatment of Animals totals in the November 2019 election.

=== November 2019 ===
Summary of the 10 November 2019 Congress of Deputies election results in Palencia
Parties and alliances	Popular vote			Seats	
Parties and alliances	Votes	%	±pp	Total	+/−
People's Party (PP)	34,195	35.70	+6.15	2	+1
Spanish Socialist Workers' Party (PSOE)	31,847	33.25	+1.93	1	±0
Vox (Vox)	13,816	14.42	+2.72	0	±0
United We Can (Podemos–IU)	7,746	8.09	–1.14	0	±0
Citizens–Party of the Citizenry (Cs)	5,937	6.20	–9.68	0	–1
Animalist Party Against Mistreatment of Animals (PACMA)	582	0.61	–0.14	0	±0
Zero Cuts–Green Group–PCAS–TC (Recortes Cero–GV–PCAS–TC)	256	0.27	+0.02	0	±0
For a Fairer World (PUM+J)	209	0.22	+0.07	0	±0
Communist Party of the Workers of Spain (PCTE)	106	0.11	–0.02	0	±0
Spanish Phalanx of the CNSO (FE de las JONS)	79	0.08	–0.01	0	±0
Blank ballots	1,015	1.06	+0.11		
Total	95,788			3	±0
Valid votes	95,788	98.71	–0.01		
Invalid votes	1,250	1.29	+0.01		
Votes cast / turnout	97,038	68.66	–7.14		
Abstentions	44,283	31.34	+7.14		
Registered voters	141,321				

=== April 2019 ===
Summary of the 28 April 2019 Congress of Deputies election results in Palencia
Parties and alliances	Popular vote			Seats	
Parties and alliances	Votes	%	±pp	Total	+/−
Spanish Socialist Workers' Party (PSOE)	33,209	31.32	+6.72	1	±0
People's Party (PP)	31,332	29.55	–16.13	1	–1
Citizens–Party of the Citizenry (Cs)	16,843	15.88	+3.53	1	+1
Vox (Vox)	12,407	11.70	New	0	±0
United We Can (Podemos–IU–Equo)	9,787	9.23	–5.75	0	±0
Animalist Party Against Mistreatment of Animals (PACMA)	799	0.75	–0.01	0	±0
Zero Cuts–Green Group–PCAS–TC (Recortes Cero–GV–PCAS–TC)	265	0.25	+0.05	0	±0
For a Fairer World (PUM+J)	159	0.15	New	0	±0
Communist Party of the Workers of Spain (PCTE)	133	0.13	New	0	±0
Spanish Phalanx of the CNSO (FE de las JONS)	99	0.09	–0.09	0	±0
Blank ballots	1,010	0.95	+0.12		
Total	106,043			3	±0
Valid votes	106,043	98.72	–0.09		
Invalid votes	1,373	1.28	+0.09		
Votes cast / turnout	107,416	75.80	+4.97		
Abstentions	34,298	24.20	–4.97		
Registered voters	141,714				

=== 2016 ===
Summary of the 26 June 2016 Congress of Deputies election results in Palencia
Parties and alliances	Popular vote			Seats	
Parties and alliances	Votes	%	±pp	Total	+/−
People's Party (PP)	45,965	45.68	+5.38	2	±0
Spanish Socialist Workers' Party (PSOE)	24,751	24.60	+0.05	1	±0
United We Can (Podemos–IU–Equo)^{1}	15,077	14.98	–2.96	0	±0
Citizens–Party of the Citizenry (C's)	12,428	12.35	–1.80	0	±0
Animalist Party Against Mistreatment of Animals (PACMA)	761	0.76	+0.16	0	±0
Union, Progress and Democracy (UPyD)	273	0.27	–0.52	0	±0
Zero Cuts–Green Group (Recortes Cero–GV)	202	0.20	+0.05	0	±0
Spanish Phalanx of the CNSO (FE de las JONS)	184	0.18	–0.03	0	±0
Communist Party of the Peoples of Spain (PCPE)	90	0.09	–0.03	0	±0
Internationalist Solidarity and Self-Management (SAIn)	57	0.06	–0.01	0	±0
Blank ballots	838	0.83	–0.12		
Total	100,626			3	±0
Valid votes	100,626	98.81	+0.02		
Invalid votes	1,212	1.19	–0.02		
Votes cast / turnout	101,838	70.83	–2.53		
Abstentions	41,931	29.17	+2.53		
Registered voters	143,769				
Sources
Footnotes: ^{1} United We Can results are compared to the combined totals of We Can and United Left–Popular Unity in Common in the 2015 election.

=== 2015 ===
Summary of the 20 December 2015 Congress of Deputies election results in Palencia
Parties and alliances	Popular vote			Seats	
Parties and alliances	Votes	%	±pp	Total	+/−
People's Party (PP)	42,182	40.30	–14.85	2	±0
Spanish Socialist Workers' Party (PSOE)	25,698	24.55	–6.73	1	±0
Citizens–Party of the Citizenry (C's)	14,814	14.15	New	0	±0
We Can (Podemos)	14,083	13.45	New	0	±0
United Left–Popular Unity in Common (IU–UPeC)	4,699	4.49	–1.38	0	±0
Union, Progress and Democracy (UPyD)	828	0.79	–3.61	0	±0
Animalist Party Against Mistreatment of Animals (PACMA)	624	0.60	+0.27	0	±0
Spanish Phalanx of the CNSO (FE de las JONS)	218	0.21	–0.01	0	±0
Blank Seats (EB)	182	0.17	New	0	±0
Zero Cuts–Green Group (Recortes Cero–GV)	159	0.15	New	0	±0
Communist Party of the Peoples of Spain (PCPE)	126	0.12	New	0	±0
Internationalist Solidarity and Self-Management (SAIn)	72	0.07	–0.01	0	±0
Blank ballots	993	0.95	–0.72		
Total	104,678			3	±0
Valid votes	104,678	98.79	+0.31		
Invalid votes	1,277	1.21	–0.31		
Votes cast / turnout	105,955	73.36	+0.15		
Abstentions	38,472	26.64	–0.15		
Registered voters	144,427				

=== 2011 ===
Summary of the 20 November 2011 Congress of Deputies election results in Palencia
Parties and alliances	Popular vote			Seats	
Parties and alliances	Votes	%	±pp	Total	+/−
People's Party (PP)	58,759	55.15	+5.43	2	±0
Spanish Socialist Workers' Party (PSOE)	33,328	31.28	–12.31	1	±0
United Left of Castile and León: Plural Left (IUCyL)	6,259	5.87	+3.27	0	±0
Union, Progress and Democracy (UPyD)	4,686	4.40	+3.12	0	±0
Party of Castile and León (PCAL)^{1}	565	0.53	+0.18	0	±0
Animalist Party Against Mistreatment of Animals (PACMA)	352	0.33	+0.18	0	±0
For a Fairer World (PUM+J)	249	0.23	+0.12	0	±0
Spanish Phalanx of the CNSO (FE de las JONS)	234	0.22	+0.14	0	±0
Regionalist Unity of Castile and León (URCL)	174	0.16	New	0	±0
Internationalist Solidarity and Self-Management (SAIn)	89	0.08	New	0	±0
Communist Unification of Spain (UCE)	77	0.07	New	0	±0
Blank ballots	1,775	1.67	+0.45		
Total	106,547			3	±0
Valid votes	106,547	98.48	–0.77		
Invalid votes	1,644	1.52	+0.77		
Votes cast / turnout	108,191	73.21	–5.96		
Abstentions	39,592	26.79	+5.96		
Registered voters	147,783				
Sources
Footnotes: ^{1} Party of Castile and León results are compared to Commoners' Land totals in the 2008 election.

=== 2008 ===
Summary of the 9 March 2008 Congress of Deputies election results in Palencia
Parties and alliances	Popular vote			Seats	
Parties and alliances	Votes	%	±pp	Total	+/−
People's Party (PP)	58,649	49.72	–0.53	2	±0
Spanish Socialist Workers' Party (PSOE)	51,426	43.59	+0.51	1	±0
United Left–Alternative (IU)	3,069	2.60	–0.24	0	±0
Union, Progress and Democracy (UPyD)	1,510	1.28	New	0	±0
Commoners' Land (TC)	417	0.35	–0.32	0	±0
The Greens (LV)	338	0.29	New	0	±0
The Greens of Europe (LVdE)	183	0.16	New	0	±0
Anti-Bullfighting Party Against Mistreatment of Animals (PACMA)	177	0.15	New	0	±0
Communist Party of the Castilian People (PCPC–PCPE)	132	0.11	+0.01	0	±0
For a Fairer World (PUM+J)	132	0.11	New	0	±0
Spanish Phalanx of the CNSO (FE de las JONS)	100	0.08	+0.02	0	±0
Citizens–Party of the Citizenry (C's)	80	0.07	New	0	±0
Engine and Sports Alternative (AMD)	74	0.06	New	0	±0
Humanist Party (PH)	67	0.06	–0.07	0	±0
National Democracy (DN)	56	0.05	±0.00	0	±0
Authentic Phalanx (FA)	37	0.03	±0.00	0	±0
Spanish Alternative (AES)	36	0.03	New	0	±0
Spanish Front (Frente)	24	0.02	New	0	±0
Centrist Party (PCTR)	17	0.01	New	0	±0
Blank ballots	1,440	1.22	–0.74		
Total	117,964			3	±0
Valid votes	117,964	99.25	+0.06		
Invalid votes	892	0.75	–0.06		
Votes cast / turnout	118,856	79.17	–0.27		
Abstentions	31,274	20.83	+0.27		
Registered voters	150,130				

=== 2004 ===
Summary of the 14 March 2004 Congress of Deputies election results in Palencia
Parties and alliances	Popular vote			Seats	
Parties and alliances	Votes	%	±pp	Total	+/−
People's Party (PP)	60,449	50.25	–5.27	2	±0
Spanish Socialist Workers' Party (PSOE)	51,824	43.08	+7.30	1	±0
United Left (IU)	3,415	2.84	–1.41	0	±0
Commoners' Land–Castilian Nationalist Party (TC–PNC)	804	0.67	–0.26	0	±0
Citizens for Blank Votes (CenB)	287	0.24	New	0	±0
Democratic and Social Centre (CDS)	279	0.23	+0.04	0	±0
Family and Life Party (PFyV)	164	0.14	New	0	±0
Humanist Party (PH)	152	0.13	+0.03	0	±0
Communist Party of the Castilian People (PCPC–PCPE)	124	0.10	–0.04	0	±0
Spanish Democratic Party (PADE)	118	0.10	+0.05	0	±0
Republican Left (IR)	109	0.09	New	0	±0
Spanish Phalanx of the CNSO (FE de las JONS)^{1}	70	0.06	–0.03	0	±0
National Democracy (DN)	55	0.05	New	0	±0
The Phalanx (FE)	41	0.03	–0.04	0	±0
Authentic Phalanx (FA)	34	0.03	New	0	±0
Republican Social Movement (MSR)	20	0.02	New	0	±0
Blank ballots	2,362	1.96	+0.01		
Total	120,307			3	±0
Valid votes	120,307	99.19	+0.02		
Invalid votes	979	0.81	–0.02		
Votes cast / turnout	121,286	79.44	+4.09		
Abstentions	31,395	20.56	–4.09		
Registered voters	152,681				
Sources
Footnotes: ^{1} Spanish Phalanx of the CNSO results are compared to Independent Spanish Phalanx–Phalanx 2000 totals in the 2000 election.

=== 2000 ===
Summary of the 12 March 2000 Congress of Deputies election results in Palencia
Parties and alliances	Popular vote			Seats	
Parties and alliances	Votes	%	±pp	Total	+/−
People's Party (PP)	64,185	55.52	+4.23	2	±0
Spanish Socialist Workers' Party–Progressives (PSOE–p)	41,368	35.78	–2.13	1	±0
United Left (IU)	4,910	4.25	–3.69	0	±0
Commoners' Land–Castilian Nationalist Party (TC–PNC)	1,080	0.93	+0.67	0	±0
Regionalist Unity of Castile and León (URCL)	556	0.48	+0.06	0	±0
Natural Law Party (PLN)	257	0.22	New	0	±0
Centrist Union–Democratic and Social Centre (UC–CDS)	225	0.19	–0.21	0	±0
Cives (Cives)	206	0.18	New	0	±0
Communist Party of the Peoples of Spain (PCPE)	161	0.14	+0.02	0	±0
Humanist Party (PH)	113	0.10	–0.03	0	±0
Independent Spanish Phalanx–Phalanx 2000 (FEI–FE 2000)	100	0.09	New	0	±0
The Phalanx (FE)	78	0.07	New	0	±0
Spain 2000 Platform (ES2000)	64	0.06	New	0	±0
Spanish Democratic Party (PADE)	59	0.05	New	0	±0
Blank ballots	2,251	1.95	+0.58		
Total	115,613			3	±0
Valid votes	115,613	99.17	–0.22		
Invalid votes	963	0.83	+0.22		
Votes cast / turnout	116,576	75.35	–5.63		
Abstentions	38,142	24.65	+5.63		
Registered voters	154,718				

=== 1996 ===
Summary of the 3 March 1996 Congress of Deputies election results in Palencia
Parties and alliances	Popular vote			Seats	
Parties and alliances	Votes	%	±pp	Total	+/−
People's Party (PP)	63,245	51.29	+3.67	2	±0
Spanish Socialist Workers' Party (PSOE)	46,740	37.91	–0.39	1	±0
United Left of Castile and León (IUCL)	9,784	7.94	+1.54	0	±0
Regionalist Unity of Castile and León (URCL)	515	0.42	+0.07	0	±0
Centrist Union (UC)	492	0.40	–2.66	0	±0
Commoners' Land–Castilian Nationalist Party (TC–PNC)	321	0.26	+0.08	0	±0
Humanist Party (PH)	165	0.13	+0.09	0	±0
Communist Party of the Peoples of Spain (PCPE)	143	0.12	±0.00	0	±0
Authentic Spanish Phalanx (FEA)	134	0.11	New	0	±0
Workers' Revolutionary Party (PRT)	71	0.06	New	0	±0
Blank ballots	1,688	1.37	+0.34		
Total	123,298			3	±0
Valid votes	123,298	99.39	+0.02		
Invalid votes	762	0.61	–0.02		
Votes cast / turnout	124,060	80.98	+0.39		
Abstentions	29,145	19.02	–0.39		
Registered voters	153,205				

=== 1993 ===
Summary of the 6 June 1993 Congress of Deputies election results in Palencia
Parties and alliances	Popular vote			Seats	
Parties and alliances	Votes	%	±pp	Total	+/−
People's Party (PP)	57,744	47.62	+3.11	2	±0
Spanish Socialist Workers' Party (PSOE)	46,448	38.30	+1.66	1	±0
United Left of Castile and León (IU)	7,761	6.40	+0.61	0	±0
Democratic and Social Centre (CDS)	3,714	3.06	–5.54	0	±0
People's Palentine Group (APP)	1,410	1.16	New	0	±0
The Greens (LV)^{1}	826	0.68	–0.48	0	±0
Ruiz-Mateos Group (ARM)	550	0.45	New	0	±0
Regionalist Unity of Castile and León (URCL)	428	0.35	New	0	±0
The Ecologists (LE)	322	0.27	–0.41	0	±0
Commoners' Land–Castilian Nationalist Party (TC–PNC)	216	0.18	New	0	±0
Communist Party of the Peoples of Spain (PCPE)	147	0.12	–0.08	0	±0
Spanish Phalanx of the CNSO (FE–JONS)	122	0.10	–0.10	0	±0
Natural Law Party (PLN)	94	0.08	New	0	±0
Castilianist Union (UC)	93	0.08	New	0	±0
Leonese People's Union (UPL)	52	0.04	New	0	±0
Humanist Party (PH)	51	0.04	–0.09	0	±0
Party of El Bierzo (PB)	35	0.03	New	0	±0
Communist Unification of Spain (UCE)	0	0.00	New	0	±0
Blank ballots	1,250	1.03	+0.11		
Total	121,263			3	±0
Valid votes	121,263	99.37	+0.33		
Invalid votes	771	0.63	–0.33		
Votes cast / turnout	122,034	80.59	+4.05		
Abstentions	29,389	19.41	–4.05		
Registered voters	151,423				
Sources
Footnotes: ^{1} The Greens results are compared to The Greens–Green List totals in the 1989 election.

=== 1989 ===
Summary of the 29 October 1989 Congress of Deputies election results in Palencia
Parties and alliances	Popular vote			Seats	
Parties and alliances	Votes	%	±pp	Total	+/−
People's Party (PP)^{1}	50,186	44.51	+4.85	2	+1
Spanish Socialist Workers' Party (PSOE)	41,313	36.64	–3.59	1	–1
Democratic and Social Centre (CDS)	9,696	8.60	–3.77	0	±0
United Left (IU)	6,533	5.79	+2.86	0	±0
The Greens–Green List (LV–LV)	1,307	1.16	New	0	±0
The Ecologist Greens (LVE)	768	0.68	New	0	±0
Workers' Socialist Party (PST)	735	0.65	+0.28	0	±0
Workers' Party of Spain–Communist Unity (PTE–UC)^{2}	398	0.35	–0.62	0	±0
Spanish Phalanx of the CNSO (FE–JONS)	226	0.20	–0.26	0	±0
Communist Party of the Peoples of Spain (PCPE)	222	0.20	New	0	±0
Alliance for the Republic (AxR)^{3}	182	0.16	–0.12	0	±0
Humanist Party (PH)	145	0.13	New	0	±0
Blank ballots	1,041	0.92	+0.18		
Total	112,752			3	±0
Valid votes	112,752	99.04	+0.86		
Invalid votes	1,088	0.96	–0.86		
Votes cast / turnout	113,840	76.54	+0.49		
Abstentions	34,891	23.46	–0.49		
Registered voters	148,731				
Sources
Footnotes: ^{1} People's Party results are compared to People's Coalition totals in the 1986 election.; ^{2} Workers' Party of Spain–Communist Unity results are compared to Communists' Unity Board totals in the 1986 election.; ^{3} Alliance for the Republic results are compared to Internationalist Socialist Workers' Party totals in the 1986 election.

=== 1986 ===
Summary of the 22 June 1986 Congress of Deputies election results in Palencia
Parties and alliances	Popular vote			Seats	
Parties and alliances	Votes	%	±pp	Total	+/−
Spanish Socialist Workers' Party (PSOE)	44,952	40.23	–2.71	2	±0
People's Coalition (AP–PDP–PL)^{1}	44,311	39.66	+0.86	1	±0
Democratic and Social Centre (CDS)	13,819	12.37	+8.47	0	±0
United Left (IU)^{2}	3,271	2.93	+0.62	0	±0
Democratic Reformist Party (PRD)	1,634	1.46	New	0	±0
Communists' Unity Board (MUC)	1,081	0.97	New	0	±0
Spanish Phalanx of the CNSO (FE–JONS)	519	0.46	New	0	±0
Workers' Socialist Party (PST)	410	0.37	New	0	±0
Communist Unification of Spain (UCE)	364	0.33	+0.11	0	±0
Internationalist Socialist Workers' Party (POSI)	317	0.28	New	0	±0
Republican Popular Unity (UPR)	234	0.21	New	0	±0
Party of the Communists of Catalonia (PCC)	0	0.00	New	0	±0
Blank ballots	827	0.74	+0.15		
Total	111,739			3	±0
Valid votes	111,739	98.18	+0.08		
Invalid votes	2,077	1.82	–0.08		
Votes cast / turnout	113,816	76.05	–7.79		
Abstentions	35,841	23.95	+7.79		
Registered voters	149,657				
Sources
Footnotes: ^{1} People's Coalition results are compared to People's Alliance–People's Democratic Party totals in the 1982 election.; ^{2} United Left results are compared to Communist Party of Spain totals in the 1982 election.

=== 1982 ===
Summary of the 28 October 1982 Congress of Deputies election results in Palencia
Parties and alliances	Popular vote			Seats	
Parties and alliances	Votes	%	±pp	Total	+/−
Spanish Socialist Workers' Party (PSOE)	49,756	42.94	+16.87	2	+1
People's Alliance–People's Democratic Party (AP–PDP)^{1}	44,965	38.80	+29.38	1	+1
Union of the Democratic Centre (UCD)	12,330	10.64	–40.79	0	–2
Democratic and Social Centre (CDS)	4,516	3.90	New	0	±0
Communist Party of Spain (PCE)	2,679	2.31	–2.24	0	±0
New Force (FN)^{2}	707	0.61	–3.16	0	±0
Communist Unification of Spain (UCE)	250	0.22	New	0	±0
Revolutionary Communist League (LCR)	0	0.00	New	0	±0
Communist Movement of Castile and León (MC–CL)	0	0.00	–0.30	0	±0
Blank ballots	678	0.59	–0.06		
Total	115,881			3	±0
Valid votes	115,881	98.10	–0.33		
Invalid votes	2,248	1.90	+0.33		
Votes cast / turnout	118,129	83.84	+12.69		
Abstentions	22,767	16.16	–12.69		
Registered voters	140,896				
Sources
Footnotes: ^{1} People's Alliance–People's Democratic Party results are compared to Democratic Coalition totals in the 1979 election.; ^{2} New Force results are compared to National Union totals in the 1979 election.

=== 1979 ===
Summary of the 1 March 1979 Congress of Deputies election results in Palencia
Parties and alliances	Popular vote			Seats	
Parties and alliances	Votes	%	±pp	Total	+/−
Union of the Democratic Centre (UCD)	51,069	51.43	+0.91	2	±0
Spanish Socialist Workers' Party (PSOE)^{1}	25,888	26.07	–2.30	1	±0
Democratic Coalition (CD)^{2}	9,351	9.42	–4.92	0	±0
Communist Party of Spain (PCE)	4,517	4.55	+0.88	0	±0
National Union (UN)	3,746	3.77	New	0	±0
Party of Labour of Spain (PTE)^{3}	1,033	1.04	+0.23	0	±0
Workers' Communist Party (PCT)	571	0.58	New	0	±0
Workers and Peasants Party (POC)	493	0.50	New	0	±0
Spanish Ruralist Party (PRE)	466	0.47	New	0	±0
Spanish Phalanx of the CNSO (Authentic) (FE–JONS(A))	367	0.37	New	0	±0
Workers' Revolutionary Organization (ORT)	325	0.33	New	0	±0
Communist Movement–Organization of Communist Left (MC–OIC)	302	0.30	New	0	±0
Communist Organization of Spain (Red Flag) (OCE–BR)	244	0.25	New	0	±0
Carlist Party (PC)	153	0.15	New	0	±0
Proverist Party (PPr)	117	0.12	New	0	±0
Blank ballots	648	0.65	+0.35		
Total	99,290			3	±0
Valid votes	99,290	98.43	+0.08		
Invalid votes	1,587	1.57	–0.08		
Votes cast / turnout	100,877	71.15	–11.62		
Abstentions	40,906	28.85	+11.62		
Registered voters	141,783				
Sources
Footnotes: ^{1} Spanish Socialist Workers' Party results are compared to the combined totals of Spanish Socialist Workers' Party and People's Socialist Party–Socialist Unity in the 1977 election.; ^{2} Democratic Coalition results are compared to People's Alliance totals in the 1977 election.; ^{3} Party of Labour of Spain results are compared to Democratic Left Front totals in the 1977 election.

=== 1977 ===
Summary of the 15 June 1977 Congress of Deputies election results in Palencia
Parties and alliances	Popular vote			Seats	
Parties and alliances	Votes	%	±pp	Total	+/−
Union of the Democratic Centre (UCD)	51,568	50.52	n/a	2	n/a
Spanish Socialist Workers' Party (PSOE)	25,878	25.35	n/a	1	n/a
People's Alliance (AP)	14,638	14.34	n/a	0	n/a
Communist Party of Spain (PCE)	3,744	3.67	n/a	0	n/a
People's Socialist Party–Socialist Unity (PSP–US)	3,084	3.02	n/a	0	n/a
City and Country Independent Electoral Group (AEICC)	1,623	1.59	n/a	0	n/a
Democratic Left Front (FDI)	829	0.81	n/a	0	n/a
Group of Carlist Electors (ADC)	396	0.39	n/a	0	n/a
Blank ballots	310	0.30	n/a		
Total	102,070			3	n/a
Valid votes	102,070	98.35	n/a		
Invalid votes	1,708	1.65	n/a		
Votes cast / turnout	103,778	82.77	n/a		
Abstentions	21,607	17.23	n/a		
Registered voters	125,385				

== Bibliography ==
- Ley 1/1977, de 4 de enero, para la Reforma Política (Fundamental Law 1/1977). Official State Gazette (in Spanish). 4 January 1977. BOE-A-1977-165.
- Real Decreto-ley 20/1977, de 18 de marzo, sobre Normas Electorales (Royal Decree-Law 20/1977). Official State Gazette (in Spanish). 18 March 1977. BOE-A-1977-7445.
- Constitución Española (Constitution). Official State Gazette (in Spanish). 27 December 1978. BOE-A-1978-31229.
- Ley Orgánica 5/1985, de 19 de junio, del Régimen Electoral General (Organic Law 5/1985). Official State Gazette (in Spanish). 19 June 1985. BOE-A-1985-11672.
- Carreras de Odriozola, Albert; Tafunell Sambola, Xavier (2005) [1989]. Estadísticas históricas de España, siglos XIX-XX (PDF) (in Spanish). Vol. 1 (II ed.). Bilbao: Fundación BBVA. pp. 1072–1097. ISBN 84-96515-00-1. Archived from the original (PDF) on 24 September 2015.
