= Left of the Peoples (1989) =

Left of the Peoples Izquierda de los Pueblos
- Founded: 1989
- Dissolved: 1994
- Preceded by: Left of the Peoples (1987)
- Ideology: Left-wing nationalism Democratic socialism Peripheral nationalism
- Political position: Left-wing
- European Parliament group: The Green Group in the European Parliament

Left of the Peoples (Spanish: Izquierda de los Pueblos, IP) was a Spanish electoral list in the European Parliament election in 1989 made up from left-wing peripheral nationalist parties. It was the successor of the 1987 coalition of the same name.

== Composition ==
Party	Scope
Basque Country Left (EE)	Basque Country, Navarre
Galician Socialist Party–Galician Left (PSG–EG)	Galicia
Valencian People's Union (UPV)	Valencian Community
Agreement of Left Nationalists (ENE)	Catalonia
Socialist Party of Majorca (PSM)	Balearic Islands
Nationalist Canarian Assembly (ACN)	Canary Islands
Aragonese Union (UA–CHA)	Aragon
Socialist Party of Menorca (PSM)	Balearic Islands
Asturianist Party (PAS)	Asturias

== Electoral performance ==
=== European Parliament ===
European Parliament
Election	Vote	%	Seats
1989	290,286 (#9)	1.83	1 / 60
