= Green List (Spain) =

Green List Lista Verde
- Founded: 1989
- Dissolved: 1989
- Preceded by: The Greens; Confederation of the Greens
- Ideology: Green politics

Green List (Spanish: Lista Verde, LV), also The Greens–Green List (Spanish: Los Verdes–Lista Verde, LV–LV), was a Spanish party alliance in the European Parliament election and general election in 1989. It was composed by most members from the 1987 Confederation of the Greens but Green Alternative–Ecologist Movement of Catalonia, as well as The Greens.

== Member parties ==
- The Greens (LV)
- The Alternative Greens (LVA)
- Ecologist Party of the Basque Country (PEE)
- Ecologist Alternative of Galicia (AEG)
