= Confederation of the Greens (1987) =

Confederation of the Greens Confederación de los Verdes
- Founded: 1987
- Succeeded by: Green List
- Ideology: Green politics

Confederation of the Greens (Spanish: Confederación de los Verdes, CV) was a Spanish party alliance in the European Parliament election in 1987.

== Member parties ==
- Green Alternative–Ecologist Movement of Catalonia (AV–MEC)
- The Alternative Greens (LVA)
- Ecologist Party of the Basque Country (PEE)
- Ecologist Alternative of Galicia (AEG)
- Natural Culture (CN)
