= Federation of Regional Parties =

Federation of Regional Parties Federación de Partidos Regionales
- Leader: Héctor Villalba
- President: Miguel Ramón Izquierdo
- Founded: 16 April 1989
- Merger of: Valencian Union; Regionalist Party of Cantabria; Regionalist Party of the Leonese Country; Union of Regionalist Parties of Castilla-La Mancha; United Extremadura; Progressive Riojan Party; Melillan People's Union; Regional Party of Madrid
- Succeeded by: Nationalist Coalition (1994)
- Ideology: Regionalism

Federation of Regional Parties (Spanish: Federación de Partidos Regionales, FPR) was a Spanish electoral list in the European Parliament election in 1989 made up from several centre-right regionalist parties. Navarrese People's Union (UPN) and the Regionalist Aragonese Party (PAR) were initially also expected to join the Federation, but chose to support the newly-founded People's Party (PP) instead.

== Composition ==
Party	Scope
Valencian Union (UV)	Valencian Community
Regionalist Party of Cantabria (PRC)	Cantabria
United Extremadura (EU)	Extremadura
Progressive Riojan Party (PRP)	La Rioja
Melillan People's Union (UPM)	Melilla
Regional Party of Madrid (PRM)	Madrid
Regionalist Party of the Leonese Country (PREPAL)	Castile and León
Union of Regionalist Parties of Castilla–La Mancha (UPRCLM)	Castilla–La Mancha
