= Left of the Peoples (1987) =

Left of the Peoples Izquierda de los Pueblos
- Founded: 1987
- Dissolved: 1989
- Succeeded by: Left of the Peoples (1989)
- Ideology: Left-wing nationalism Democratic socialism Peripheral nationalism
- Political position: Left-wing

Left of the Peoples (Spanish: Izquierda de los Pueblos, IP) was a Spanish electoral list in the European Parliament election in 1987 made up from regionalist parties.

== Composition ==
Party	Scope
Basque Country Left (EE)	Basque Country, Navarre
Galician Socialist Party–Galician Left (PSG–EG)	Galicia
Agreement of Left Nationalists (ENE)	Catalonia
Socialist Party of Majorca (PSM)	Balearic Islands
Socialist Party of Menorca (PSM)	Balearic Islands
Aragonese Union (UA–CHA)	Aragon

== Electoral performance ==
=== European Parliament ===
European Parliament
Election	Vote	%	Seats
1987	261,328 (#8)	1.36	0 / 60
