= Nationalist Party of Castile and León =

Nationalist Party of Castile and León Partido Nacionalista de Castilla y León
- Founded: November 1977
- Dissolved: 2002
- Ideology: Castilian nationalism
- International affiliation: Centrist Democrat International

The Nationalist Party of Castile and León (Spanish: Partido Nacionalista de Castilla y León; PANCAL) was a Castilian nationalist political party in Spain, founded in November 1977 and based in Castile and León. The PANCAL aimed for the merging of Cantabria and La Rioja into Castile and León, the recognition of historical nationality status for this region and tax exemptions for Castile and León similar to those of Navarre and the Basque Country.
