= Green Alternative–Ecologist Movement of Catalonia =

Green Alternative–Ecologist Movement of Catalonia Alternativa Verda–Moviment Ecologista de Catalunya
- Founded: 1983
- Dissolved: 1993
- Succeeded by: The Greens–Ecologist Confederation of Catalonia
- Ideology: Ecologism; Catalan nationalism
- National affiliation: The Greens (1984–85)

Green Alternative–Ecologist Movement of Catalonia (Catalan: Alternativa Verda–Moviment Ecologista de Catalunya, AV–MEC) was an ecologist, catalan nationalist political party in Spain, based in Catalonia. It was founded in 1983 from members of Ecologist Movement of Catalonia and Left Nationalists.
