= 1993 Spanish general election =

- 6 June 1993

All 350 seats in the Congress of Deputies and 208 (of 256) seats in the Senate 176 seats needed for a majority in the Congress of Deputies
- Opinion polls
- Registered: 31,030,511 ▲4.8%
- Turnout: 23,718,816 (76.4%) ▲6.7 pp
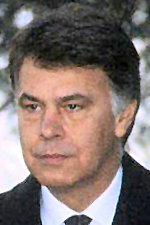

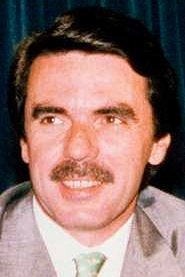

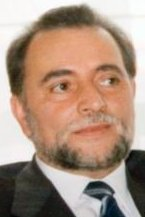

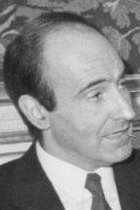

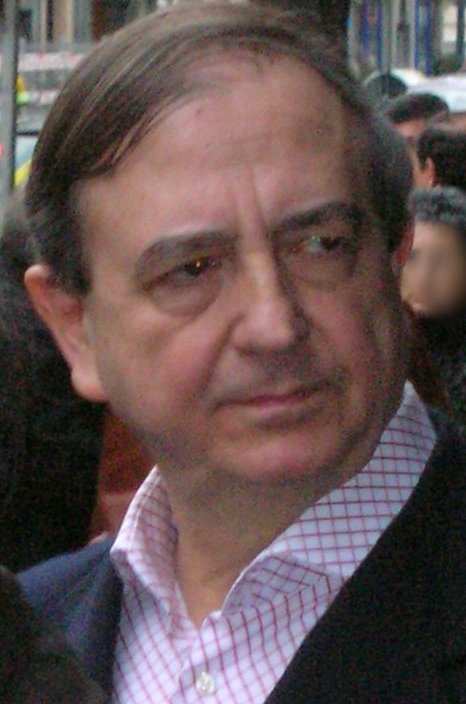

	First party	Second party	Third party
Leader	Felipe González	José María Aznar	Julio Anguita
Party	PSOE	PP	IU
Leader since	28 September 1979	2 September 1989	12 February 1989
Leader's seat	Madrid	Madrid	Madrid
Last election	177 seats, 40.1% (Note: Results for PSOE (39.6%, 175 deputies) and EE (0.5%, 2 deputies) in the 1989 Congress election.)	107 seats, 25.8%	17 seats, 9.1%
Seats won	159	141	18
Seat change	▼18	▲34	▲1
Popular vote	9,150,083	8,201,463	2,253,722
Percentage	38.8%	34.8%	9.6%
Swing	▼1.3 pp	▲9.0 pp	▲0.5 pp
	Fourth party	Fifth party	Sixth party
Leader	Miquel Roca	Iñaki Anasagasti	Luis Mardones
Party	CiU	EAJ/PNV	CC
Leader since	4 July 1982	1986	18 April 1986
Leader's seat	Barcelona	Biscay	Santa Cruz de Tenerife
Last election	18 seats, 5.0%	5 seats, 1.2%	1 seats, 0.3%
Seats won	17	5	4
Seat change	▼1	0	▲3
Popular vote	1,165,783	291,448	207,077
Percentage	4.9%	1.2%	0.9%
Swing	▼0.1 pp	0.0 pp	▲0.6 pp
Prime Minister before election
Felipe González
PSOE
Prime Minister after election
Felipe González
PSOE

A general election was held in Spain on 6 June 1993 to elect the members of the 5th Cortes Generales under the Spanish Constitution of 1978. All 350 seats in the Congress of Deputies were up for election, as well as 208 of 256 seats in the Senate.

The outcome of the 1989 election—amid accusations of irregularities and a re-run in Melilla—had seen the ruling Spanish Socialist Workers' Party (PSOE) under Prime Minister Felipe González forming a de facto majority government, thanks to Herri Batasuna's policy of abstentionism. His third term saw Spain's participation in the Gulf War, the completion of major infrastructure works such as the Madrid–Seville high-speed rail line, the hosting of events such as the Seville Expo '92 and the 1992 Barcelona Olympics, and the signing of the Maastricht Treaty (which led to the adoption of an austerity agenda to meet the euro convergence criteria). This period also saw the unveiling of scandals affecting the ruling PSOE: the Juan Guerra affair (which led to Alfonso Guerra's resignation as deputy prime minister), the Ibercorp affair (involving suspicions of misconduct by the Bank of Spain), and a judicial probe on the alleged illegal funding of PSOE campaigns (the Filesa affair). The outset of the early 1990s recession and the 1992 European Monetary System crisis, and their impact on the Spanish economy—amid rising inflation and unemployment—forced the government to devalue the peseta three times. The mounting crises and political tensions prompted González to call a snap election for June 1993.

Economic uncertainty and opinion polling predictions of a very close result polarized the campaign and fueled a large voter turnout of 76.4%, the highest since 1982. González's PSOE overperformed expectations and emerged as the largest party for a fourth consecutive time, gaining one million votes from 1989, though it lost the overall majority it had held after one decade in power. In contrast, the People's Party (PP) under José María Aznar benefitted from the collapse of the Democratic and Social Centre, making significant inroads by increasing its support to almost 35% of the vote with three million more votes, but it slightly underperformed expectations (which hinted at the PP securing the most seats); this was attributed to González being perceived as decisively defeating Aznar in the second of two head-to-head leaders' debates. United Left (IU) remained stagnant, with party leader Julio Anguita having suffered a stroke that prevented him from campaigning. In his victory speech, an emotional González proclaimed having "understood the message" and the citizens' desire for "change upon change".

For the first time since 1979, the election brought in a hung parliament, but parliamentary arithmetics meant that the PSOE remained the only party able to form a government. His animosity with IU's Anguita forced González to seek the support from peripheral nationalist groups—such as Convergence and Union (CiU) and the Basque Nationalist Party (PNV)—in order to renew his tenure, in exchange for concessions on regional autonomy. His fourth government was a minority one, in spite of coalition offerings made to CiU and PNV being rejected.

== Background ==
The 175-seat victory of the Spanish Socialist Workers' Party (PSOE) in the 1989 general election (exactly half of Congress), together with Herri Batasuna's policy of abstentionism, allowed Felipe González to form a de facto majority government in Spain. Reports of election irregularities over the electoral roll in a number of constituencies saw a re-run in Melilla and only 332 lawmakers being sworn-in by the time of González's investiture as prime minister of Spain, prompting him to submit (and win) a confidence motion in April 1990.

On the international stage, Spain participated in the multinational military coalition formed in response to the Iraqi invasion of Kuwait leading to the Gulf War (which saw an increase in conscientious objectors to compulsory military service in Spain), and in the signing of the Maastricht Treaty, which established the European Union (EU) and provided a roadmap towards a common currency. Domestically, González's third government oversaw the liberalization of the television market (seeing the first private TV channels in Spain—Antena 3, Telecinco and Canal+—challenge RTVE's monopoly on television broadcasting), and a tax harmonization with the European Communities (seeing reforms in VAT and excise taxes such as alcohol, tobacco or fuel). Reforms were enacted in 1991 to improve the procedures for election petition and electoral roll updating. The establishment of a "European citizenship" by Maastricht required a constitutional reform (the first since the approval of the 1978 Constitution) to introduce active and passive suffrage in local elections for nationals of EU member states. These years also saw the country hosting events such as the Madrid Conference of 1991, the Seville Expo '92 (celebrating the Columbus Quincentenary), Madrid's European Capital of Culture designation and the 1992 Summer Olympics in Barcelona (which served as a demonstration of Spain's soft power), as well as the completion of major infrastructure works such as the Madrid–Seville high-speed rail line and the establishment of the first AVE service.

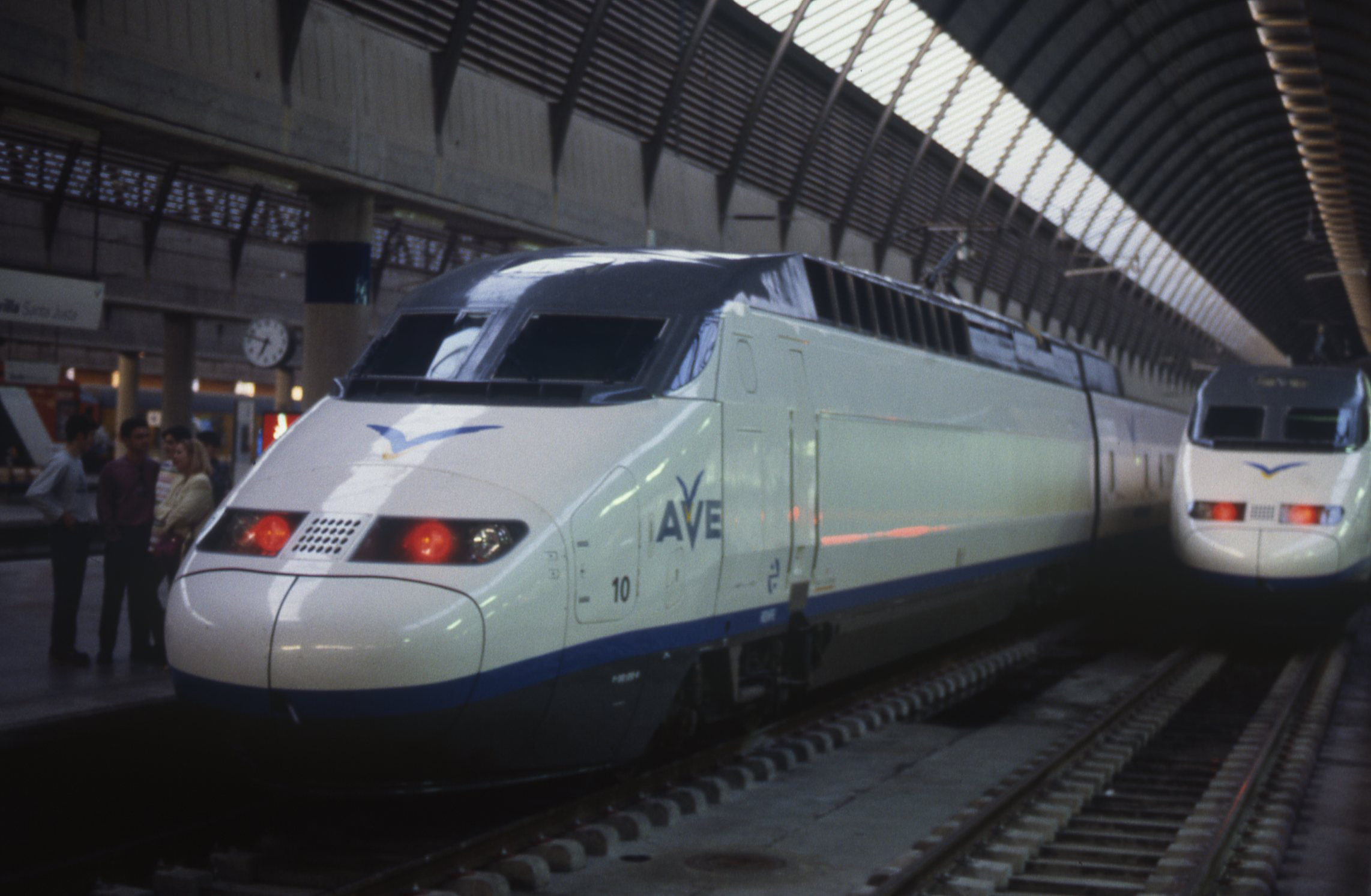
The Spanish economy temporarily weathered the impact of the early 1990s recession thanks to investments in the Seville Expo '92, the Barcelona Olympics or the Madrid–Seville high-speed rail line.

The ETA group intensified its attacks in the run up to the Barcelona Olympics to gain wider attention, seeing the 1990 Sabadell bombing, the 1991 bombings in Mutxamel and Vic (the latter killing 5 children), and the 1992 Madrid bombing, as well as a number of attacks in the Netherlands. A major Franco–Spanish police operation in March 1992 resulted in the arrest of the ETA leadership at the time in the French commune of Bidart. The 1992 Citizen Security Protection Law, aimed both at repealing outdated public security legislation (in force since Franco's dictatorship) and helping the fight against drug-related crimes (which in June 1990 had already seen major action against the Galician mafia), was criticized due to it empowering law enforcement forces to enter a home without the need for a warrant. These provisions (which earned the bill the "Kick in the Door Law" nickname) would be eventually struck by the Spanish Constitutional Court in November 1993, prompting the resignation of the interior minister and the law's promoter, José Luis Corcuera.

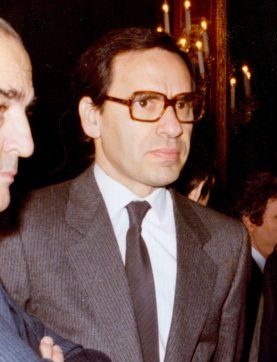
The Juan Guerra affair forced Alfonso Guerra's resignation as deputy prime minister.

Divisions formed within the PSOE over strategy after one decade in power. The party's apparatus under deputy leader Alfonso Guerra (referred to as guerristas) reasserted its control in the 1990 congress (which also formalized the party's separation from the Workers' General Union), but a schism arose with those advocating for the government's political autonomy and greater openness (influenced by González). The rift between the two leaders and the Juan Guerra affair (involving Guerra's brother in a nepotism, influence peddling and tax evasion scandal) prompted Guerra's resignation as deputy prime minister in January 1991. Opposition to the Socialist government coalesced around the People's Party (PP) and its new party leader, José María Aznar. The 1991 local and regional elections saw the PSOE losing important local councils to PP-supported coalitions, such as Valencia and Seville, as well as the collapse of the Democratic and Social Centre and the farewell of its leader, Adolfo Suárez, from active politics.

During this period, a string of political scandals undermined the government's public image. The Filesa affair, an illegal scheme to fund PSOE campaigns in the 1980s (using money funnelled through various party-linked companies in exchange for fictitious consultancy works), was unveiled in May 1991. Julián García Valverde was forced to resign as health minister in January 1992 after it was revealed that RENFE—the state-owned company operating the national Iberian-gauge railway network, which he had presided between 1985 and 1991—had purchased overpriced lands hinting at a possible embezzlement. The Ibercorp affair in February 1992 saw the governor of the Bank of Spain, Mariano Rubio, accused of owning stock shares in the Ibercorp investment bank and concealing these from the National Securities Market Commission; while Rubio denied all accusations, he was not renewed for a new term in the post. November that year saw the uncovering of an illegal kickback-for-contract scheme involving the overpriced purchase of newsprint for the Official State Gazette (BOE), in what would become known as the BOE affair.

From 1992 onwards—amid González's efforts to meet the euro convergence criteria, which earned him a general strike in 1992 over cuts to unemployment benefits and a proposed Law on Strikes—the Spanish economy was severely affected by the early 1990s worldwide recession, the high debt incurred by public administrations and companies over the investments in events and public works (which had temporarily helped Spain weather the crisis's impact), and rising inflation stemming from the 1992 European Monetary System crisis (aggravated by the outcome of the 1992 Danish Maastricht Treaty referendum and the Bundesbank's raise of German interest rates in response to excess expenditure on German reunification). The currency crisis and the economic slowdown strained the Bank of Spain's reserves and led to a sharp increase in the unemployment rate, worsening economic forecasts, and the country entering recession in Q4 1992. This forced the government to devalue the peseta three times in nine months (on 17 September and 21 November 1992, and 13 May 1993; the latter becoming known as "Black Thursday"), approve broad budget cuts, and freeze civil servants' wages for 1993 (partially reversed in January that year).

The last months of the legislative term were dominated by an increasingly hostile opposition from the PP (fueled by improving ratings and the government's growing unpopularity in opinion polls), mounting revelations in the ongoing scandals affecting the ruling party, and the continuation of internal problems within the PSOE (with a growing confrontation between González and the guerrista faction and doubts about the prime minister's willingness to stand for re-election). Polling predictions of a hung parliament also increased the role of regionalist and peripheral nationalist parties as prospective kingmakers (particularly Convergence and Union and the Basque Nationalist Party), with the PP trying a rapprochement with these to overcome the party's perceived difficulty in securing an outright majority. González ultimately chose to run for a fourth term and to advance the election to June 1993, in an effort to prevent further erosion to his party.

== Overview ==
Under the 1978 Constitution, the Spanish Cortes Generales were conceived as an imperfect bicameral system. The Congress of Deputies held greater legislative power than the Senate, having the ability to grant or withdraw confidence from a prime minister and to override Senate vetoes by an absolute majority. Nonetheless, the Senate retained a limited number of specific functions—such as ratifying international treaties, authorizing cooperation agreements between autonomous communities, enforcing direct rule, regulating interterritorial compensation funds, and taking part in constitutional amendments and in the appointment of members to the Constitutional Court and the General Council of the Judiciary—which were not subject to override by Congress.

=== Date ===
The term of each chamber of the Cortes Generales—the Congress and the Senate—expired four years from the date of their previous election, unless they were dissolved earlier. The election decree was required to be issued no later than 25 days before the scheduled expiration date of parliament and published on the following day in the Official State Gazette (BOE), with election day taking place between 54 and 60 days after the decree's publication. The previous election was held on 29 October 1989, which meant that the chambers' terms would have expired on 29 October 1993. The election decree was required to be published in the BOE no later than 5 October 1993, setting the latest possible date for election day on 4 December 1993.

The prime minister had the prerogative to propose the monarch to dissolve both chambers at any given time—either jointly or separately—and call a snap election, provided that no motion of no confidence was in process, no state of emergency was in force and that dissolution did not occur before one year after a previous one. Additionally, both chambers were to be dissolved and a new election called if an investiture process failed to elect a prime minister within a two-month period from the first ballot. Barring this exception, there was no constitutional requirement for simultaneous elections to the Congress and the Senate. Still, as of 2026, there has been no precedent of separate elections taking place under the 1978 Constitution.

Speculation on whether a snap election would be called had been ongoing for over one year before the actual date. In February 1992, González rejected using the 1992 events (the "wonderful year") to gain electoral advantage through an early dissolution. Amid a worsening economic outlook and falling approval ratings for the government and his party, González rejected in June and August 1992 that he was considering an early election. In November 1992, the prevailing view was that both González and his government preferred to serve out their term in the face of the adverse economic and political situation. Renewed speculation emerged in January 1993 after the government reserved several sports pavilions from April to July and from September to December to house computer facilities for electoral organization, despite González's insistence of an autumn election. Ultimately and amid growing economic and political pressure, González U-turned and announced the election for 6 June 1993—half-a-year earlier than scheduled—justifying it in the need to solve "tensions in Spanish political life" that prevented his government from "addressing the economic crisis".

The Cortes Generales were officially dissolved on 13 April 1993 with the publication of the corresponding decree in the BOE, setting election day for 6 June and scheduling for both chambers to reconvene on 29 June.

=== Electoral system ===
Voting for each chamber of the Cortes Generales was based on universal suffrage, comprising all Spanish nationals over 18 years of age with full political rights, provided that they had not been deprived of the right to vote by a final sentence, nor were legally incapacitated.

The Congress of Deputies had a minimum of 300 and a maximum of 400 seats, with electoral provisions fixing its size at 350. Of these, 348 were elected in 50 multi-member constituencies corresponding to the provinces of Spain—each of which was assigned an initial minimum of two seats and the remaining 248 distributed in proportion to population—using the D'Hondt method and closed-list proportional voting, with a three percent-threshold of valid votes (including blank ballots) in each constituency. The remaining two seats were allocated to Ceuta and Melilla as single-member districts elected by plurality voting. The use of this electoral method resulted in a higher effective threshold depending on district magnitude and vote distribution.

As a result of the aforementioned allocation, each Congress multi-member constituency was entitled the following seats:

Seats	Constituencies (Note: The provinces of Gerona and Lérida were officially renamed as "Girona" and "Lleida" on 1 March 1992.)
34	Madrid^{(+1)}
32	Barcelona
16	Valencia
12	Seville
10	Alicante, Málaga
9	Asturias, Biscay^{(−1)}, Cádiz, La Coruña, Murcia
8	Pontevedra
7	Balearics^{(+1)}, Córdoba, Granada, Las Palmas, Santa Cruz de Tenerife, Zaragoza
6	Badajoz, Guipúzcoa^{(−1)}, Jaén, Tarragona^{(+1)}
5	Almería, Cáceres, Cantabria, Castellón, Ciudad Real, Girona, Huelva, León, Lugo, Navarre, Toledo, Valladolid
4	Álava, Albacete, Burgos, La Rioja, Lleida, Orense^{(−1)}, Salamanca
3	Ávila, Cuenca, Guadalajara, Huesca, Palencia, Segovia, Soria, Teruel, Zamora

208 Senate seats were elected using open-list (Note: Parties could group candidates into lists, although each candidate was treated separately for the purpose of the voting procedure.) partial block voting: voters in constituencies electing four seats could choose up to three candidates; in those with two or three seats, up to two; and in single-member districts, one. Each of the 47 peninsular provinces was allocated four seats, while in insular provinces—such as the Balearic and Canary Islands—the districts were the islands themselves, with the larger ones (Mallorca, Gran Canaria and Tenerife) being allocated three seats each, and the smaller ones (Menorca, Ibiza–Formentera, Fuerteventura, La Gomera, El Hierro, Lanzarote and La Palma) one each. Ceuta and Melilla elected two seats each. Additionally, autonomous communities could appoint at least one senator each and were entitled to one additional seat per million inhabitants.

The law did not provide for by-elections to fill vacant seats; instead, any vacancies arising after the proclamation of candidates and during the legislative term were filled by the next candidates on the party lists or, when required, by designated substitutes.

=== Outgoing parliament ===
The tables below show the composition of the parliamentary groups in both chambers at the time of dissolution.

Parliamentary composition in April 1993
Congress of Deputies
Groups	Parties	Deputies	
Groups	Parties	Seats	Total
Socialist Group of the Congress	PSOE	155	175
Socialist Group of the Congress	PSC	20	175
People's Parliamentary Group in the Congress	PP	104	106
People's Parliamentary Group in the Congress	UPN	2	106
Catalan Parliamentary Group (Convergence and Union)	CDC	13	18
Catalan Parliamentary Group (Convergence and Union)	UDC	5	18
United Left–Initiative for Catalonia; Parliamentary Group	IU	14	17
United Left–Initiative for Catalonia; Parliamentary Group	IC	3	17
CDS Parliamentary Group	CDS	12	12
Basque Parliamentary Group (PNV)	EAJ/PNV	5	5
Mixed Parliamentary Group	HB	4	17
Mixed Parliamentary Group	PA	2	17
Mixed Parliamentary Group	UV	2	17
Mixed Parliamentary Group	EA	2	17
Mixed Parliamentary Group	EE	1	17
Mixed Parliamentary Group	EuE	1	17
Mixed Parliamentary Group	PAR	1	17
Mixed Parliamentary Group	AIC	1	17
Mixed Parliamentary Group	INDEP	3 (Note: Carlos Revilla and Antoni Fernández Teixidó, former CDS legislators; Felipe Baeza, former PP legislator.)	17

Parliamentary composition in April 1993
Senate
Groups	Parties	Senators	
Groups	Parties	Seats	Total
Socialist Parliamentary Group	PSOE	120	128
Socialist Parliamentary Group	PSC	8	128
People's Parliamentary Group in the Senate	PP	88	91
People's Parliamentary Group in the Senate	UPN	2	91
People's Parliamentary Group in the Senate	UM	1	91
Convergence and Union's; Catalan Parliamentary Group in the Senate	CDC	11	14
Convergence and Union's; Catalan Parliamentary Group in the Senate	UDC	3	14
Basque Nationalist Senators' Parliamentary Group	EAJ/PNV	6	6
Mixed Parliamentary Group	IU	3	15
Mixed Parliamentary Group	HB	3	15
Mixed Parliamentary Group	AIC	3	15
Mixed Parliamentary Group	CDS	1	15
Mixed Parliamentary Group	EA	1	15
Mixed Parliamentary Group	PAR	1	15
Mixed Parliamentary Group	AM	1	15
Mixed Parliamentary Group	AHI	1	15
Mixed Parliamentary Group	ENV	1	15

== Candidates ==
=== Nomination rules ===
Spanish citizens with the right to vote could run for election, provided that they had not been criminally imprisoned by a final sentence or convicted—whether final or not—of offences that involved loss of eligibility or disqualification from public office (such as rebellion or terrorism, when involving crimes against life, physical integrity or personal freedom). Additional causes of ineligibility applied to the following officials:

- Members of the Spanish royal family and their spouses;
- Holders of a number of senior public or institutional posts, including the heads and members of higher courts and state institutions; (Note: These comprised the Constitutional Court, the General Council of the Judiciary, the Supreme Court, the Council of State, the Court of Auditors and the Economic and Social Council.) the Ombudsman; the State's Attorney General; high-ranking officials of government departments, the Office of the Prime Minister and other state agencies; government delegates in the autonomous communities and civil governors; the director-general of RTVE; the director of the Electoral Register Office; the governor and deputy governor of the Bank of Spain; the heads of official credit institutions; and members of electoral commissions and of the Nuclear Safety Council;
- Heads of diplomatic missions abroad;
- Judges and public prosecutors in active service;
- Members of the Armed Forces and law enforcement bodies in active service.

Other ineligibility provisions also applied to a number of territorial officials in these categories within their areas of jurisdiction, as well as to employees of foreign states and members of regional governments.

Incompatibility rules included those of ineligibility, and also barred running in multiple constituencies or lists, and combining legislative roles (deputy, senator, and regional lawmaker) with each other or with:

- A number of senior public or institutional posts, including the presidency of the Competition Defence Court; and leadership positions in RTVE, government offices, public authorities (such as port authorities, hydrographic confederations, or highway concessionary companies), public entities and state-owned or publicly funded companies;
- Any other paid public or private position, except university teaching.

=== Parties and lists ===
The electoral law allowed for parties and federations registered in the interior ministry, alliances and groupings of electors to present lists of candidates. Parties and federations intending to form an alliance were required to inform the relevant electoral commission within 10 days of the election call, whereas groupings of electors needed to secure the signature of at least one percent of the electorate in the constituencies for which they sought election, disallowing electors from signing for more than one list.

Below is a list of the main parties and alliances which contested the election:

Candidacy	Parties and alliances	Leading candidate	Ideology	Previous result				Gov.	Ref.
Candidacy	Parties and alliances	Leading candidate	Ideology	Congress		Senate		Gov.	Ref.
Candidacy	Parties and alliances	Leading candidate	Ideology	Vote %	Seats	Vote %	Seats	Gov.	Ref.
PSOE	List: Spanish Socialist Workers' Party (PSOE); Socialists' Party of Catalonia (PSC)	Felipe González	Social democracy	40.1%	177	40.7% (Note: Results for PSOE (40.1%, 107 senators) and EE (0.5%, 0 senators) in the 1989 Senate election.)	107	15	
PP	List: People's Party (PP); Navarrese People's Union (UPN)	José María Aznar	Conservatism; Christian democracy	25.8%	107	26.1%	78	15	
CiU	List: Democratic Convergence of Catalonia (CDC); Democratic Union of Catalonia (UDC)	Miquel Roca	Catalan nationalism Centrism	5.0%	18	5.3%	10	15	
IU	List: United Left (IU) – Communist Party of Spain (PCE) – Socialist Action Party (PASOC) – Republican Left (IR) – Collectives for the Unity of Workers (CUT) – Galician Left (EG); Initiative for Catalonia (IC) – Unified Socialist Party of Catalonia (PSUC)	Julio Anguita	Socialism; Communism	9.1%	17	8.8%	1	15	
CDS	List: Democratic and Social Centre (CDS)	Rafael Calvo Ortega	Centrism; Liberalism	7.9%	14	7.6%	1	15	
EAJ/PNV	List: Basque Nationalist Party (EAJ/PNV)	Iñaki Anasagasti	Basque nationalism Christian democracy	1.2%	5	1.3%	4	15	
HB	List: Popular Unity (HB) – Basque Nationalist Action (EAE/ANV) – Patriotic Socialist Committees (ASK)	Jon Idigoras	Basque independence Abertzale left Revolutionary socialism	1.1%	4	1.1%	3	15	
PA	List: Andalusian Party (PA)	Salvador Pérez Bueno	Andalusian nationalism Social democracy	1.0%	2	1.2%	0	15	
UV	List: Valencian Union (UV)	Vicente González Lizondo	Blaverism; Conservatism	0.7%	2	0.6%	0	15	
EA–EuE	List: Basque Solidarity (EA); Basque Left (EuE)	Xabier Albistur	Basque nationalism Social democracy	0.7%	2	0.7%	0	15	
PAR	List: Aragonese Party (PAR)	José María Mur	Regionalism; Centrism	0.4%	1	0.4%	0	15	
CC	List: Canarian Independent Groups (AIC) – Tenerife Group of Independents (ATI) – La Palma Group of Independents (API) – Gomera Group of Independents (AGI) – Independents of Fuerteventura (IF) – Lanzarote Independents Party (PIL); Nationalist Canarian Initiative (ICAN); Independent Canarian Centre (CCI); Canarian Nationalist Party (PNC); Independent Herrenian Group (AHI); Majorera Assembly (AM)	Lorenzo Olarte	Regionalism; Canarian nationalism Centrism	0.3% (Note: Results for AIC in the 1989 election.)	1	0.2%	4	15	
ERC	List: Republican Left of Catalonia (ERC)	Pilar Rahola	Catalan independence Left-wing nationalism Social democracy	0.4%	0	0.4%	0	15	

== Campaign ==
=== Party slogans ===
Party or alliance	Original slogan	English translation	Ref.
PSOE	« Vota futuro » « Por el progreso de la mayoría »	"Vote for the future" "For the progress of the majority"	
PP	« Ahora. Gobierno para todos »	"Now. Government for everyone"	
CiU	« Ara, decidirem »	"Now, we shall decide"	
IU	« Izquierda Unida, sí. La alternativa necesaria »	"United Left, yes. The necessary alternative"	
CDS	« Ahora más que nunca, el centro es necesario » « Esta vez, el voto útil es al auténtico centro »	"Now more than ever, the centre is necessary" "This time, tactical voting is for the true centre"	

=== Debates ===
The 1993 election was the first in Spanish history to see the use of leaders' debates.

1993 Spanish general election debates
Date	Organizer(s)	Moderator(s)	P Present (Note: Denotes a main invitee attending the event.) S Surrogate (Note: Denotes a main invitee not attending the event, sending a surrogate in their place.) NI Not invited I Invited A Absent invitee			
Date	Organizer(s)	Moderator(s)	PSOE	PP	Audience	Ref.
24 May	Antena 3	Manuel Campo Vidal	P González	P Aznar	61.8% (9,625,000)	
31 May	Tele 5	Luis Mariñas	P González	P Aznar	75.3% (10,526,000)	

Opinion polls

Candidate viewed as "performing best" or "most convincing" in each debate
Debate	Polling firm/Commissioner	PSOE	PP	Tie	None	Question
24 May	Demoscopia/El País	21.0	50.0	29.0		
24 May	Opina/La Vanguardia	18.4	42.5	8.1	13.9	17.2
24 May	Sigma Dos/El Mundo	28.0	49.8	22.2		
31 May	Demoscopia/El País	48.0	18.0	34.0		
31 May	Opina/La Vanguardia	36.2	15.3	17.4	13.6	17.5

== Opinion polls ==
Local regression trend line of poll results from 29 October 1989 to 6 June 1993, with each line corresponding to a political party.

== Voter turnout ==
The table below shows registered voter turnout during the election. Figures for election day do not include non-resident citizens, while final figures do.

Region	Time (Election day)									Final		
Region	14:00			18:00			20:00			Final		
Region	1989	1993	+/–	1989	1993	+/–	1989	1993	+/–	1989	1993	+/–
Andalusia	34.43%	42.12%	+7.69	55.25%	61.65%	+6.40	69.46%	76.52%	+7.06	69.33%	76.20%	+6.87
Aragon	37.60%	44.95%	+7.35	56.33%	62.83%	+6.50	70.31%	78.48%	+8.17	70.21%	78.16%	+7.95
Asturias	36.73%	41.68%	+4.95	57.22%	62.00%	+4.78	69.13%	76.16%	+7.03	68.90%	75.43%	+6.53
Balearics	34.63%	41.46%	+6.83	50.40%	56.61%	+6.21	63.59%	72.78%	+9.19	63.54%	72.56%	+9.02
Basque Country	35.89%	37.92%	+2.03	52.92%	54.60%	+1.68	67.00%	69.99%	+2.99	66.90%	69.73%	+2.83
Canary Islands	27.65%	31.24%	+3.59	45.05%	51.59%	+6.54	62.31%	69.34%	+7.03	62.15%	68.92%	+6.77
Cantabria	36.59%	38.60%	+2.01	59.16%	62.49%	+3.33	74.51%	79.61%	+5.10	74.28%	78.98%	+4.70
Castile and León	37.70%	43.39%	+5.69	59.61%	64.42%	+4.81	73.59%	78.92%	+5.33	73.35%	78.27%	+4.92
Castilla–La Mancha	39.10%	45.59%	+6.49	62.19%	67.35%	+5.16	76.54%	82.37%	+5.83	76.44%	82.13%	+5.69
Catalonia	36.27%	41.68%	+5.41	54.52%	59.16%	+4.64	67.71%	75.69%	+7.98	67.62%	75.37%	+7.75
Extremadura	40.83%	47.49%	+6.66	60.67%	66.14%	+5.47	75.72%	80.89%	+5.17	75.57%	80.46%	+4.89
Galicia	27.91%	34.74%	+6.83	49.17%	55.62%	+6.45	60.80%	71.30%	+10.50	60.13%	69.64%	+9.51
La Rioja	39.42%	47.45%	+8.03	57.64%	65.23%	+7.59	72.21%	80.37%	+8.16	72.04%	80.00%	+7.96
Madrid	34.70%	40.67%	+5.97	58.64%	64.20%	+5.56	72.88%	78.99%	+6.11	72.72%	78.92%	+6.20
Murcia	39.19%	47.65%	+8.46	61.27%	66.19%	+4.92	74.41%	81.96%	+7.55	74.25%	81.56%	+7.31
Navarre	34.07%	40.00%	+5.93	53.38%	57.08%	+3.70	68.72%	74.05%	+5.33	68.54%	73.58%	+5.04
Valencian Community	41.92%	48.43%	+6.51	62.16%	68.11%	+5.95	74.93%	82.10%	+7.17	74.80%	81.71%	+6.91
Ceuta	30.23%	35.49%	+5.26	45.86%	50.07%	+4.21	56.14%	62.55%	+6.41	55.94%	62.13%	+6.19
Melilla (Note: 1989 turnout figures in Melilla correspond to the March 1990 re-run.)	30.82%	35.06%	+4.24	46.96%	51.37%	+4.41	51.97%	66.87%	+14.90	51.89%	66.14%	+14.25
Total	35.78%	41.83%	+6.05	56.20%	61.57%	+5.37	69.93%	76.94%	+7.01	69.74%	76.44%	+6.70

== Results ==
=== Congress of Deputies ===
← Summary of the 6 June 1993 Congress of Deputies election results →
Parties and alliances	Popular vote			Seats	
Parties and alliances	Votes	%	±pp	Total	+/−
Spanish Socialist Workers' Party (PSOE)^{1}	9,150,083	38.78	−1.33	159	−18
People's Party (PP)	8,201,463	34.76	+8.97	141	+34
United Left (IU)	2,253,722	9.55	+0.48	18	+1
Convergence and Union (CiU)	1,165,783	4.94	−0.10	17	−1
Democratic and Social Centre (CDS)	414,740	1.76	−6.13	0	−14
Basque Nationalist Party (EAJ/PNV)	291,448	1.24	±0.00	5	±0
Canarian Coalition (CC)^{2}	207,077	0.88	+0.45	4	+3
Popular Unity (HB)	206,876	0.88	−0.18	2	−2
Republican Left of Catalonia (ERC)	189,632	0.80	+0.39	1	+1
The Greens (Verdes)^{3}	185,940	0.79	−0.11	0	±0
Aragonese Party (PAR)	144,544	0.61	+0.26	1	±0
Basque Solidarity–Basque Left (EA–EuE)	129,293	0.55	−0.12	1	−1
Galician Nationalist Bloc (BNG)	126,965	0.54	+0.31	0	±0
Valencian Union (UV)	112,341	0.48	−0.23	1	−1
Andalusian Party (PA)	96,513	0.41	−0.63	0	−2
The Ecologists (LE)	68,851	0.29	−0.38	0	±0
Ruiz-Mateos Group–European Democratic Alliance (ARM–ADE)	54,518	0.23	−0.84	0	±0
Andalusian Progress Party (PAP)	43,169	0.18	New	0	±0
Valencian People's Union (UPV)	41,052	0.17	−0.03	0	±0
Workers' Socialist Party (PST)	30,068	0.13	−0.27	0	±0
Union for the Progress of Cantabria (UPCA)	27,005	0.11	New	0	±0
Nationalists of the Balearic Islands (PSM–ENE)	20,118	0.09	+0.05	0	±0
Regionalist Party of Cantabria (PRC)	18,608	0.08	New	0	±0
Alavese Unity (UA)	16,623	0.07	New	0	±0
Liberal Independent Group (GIL)	16,452	0.07	New	0	±0
Party of Gran Canaria (PGC)	15,246	0.06	New	0	±0
Leonese People's Union (UPL)	13,097	0.06	New	0	±0
Natural Law Party (PLN)	11,392	0.05	New	0	±0
Asturianist Party (PAS)	11,088	0.05	+0.02	0	±0
United Extremadura (EU)	10,653	0.05	±0.00	0	±0
Communist Party of the Peoples of Spain (PCPE)	10,233	0.04	−0.27	0	±0
Majorcan, Menorcan and Pityusic Union (UMMP)	10,053	0.04	New	0	±0
Ecologist Party of Catalonia–VERDE (PEC–VERDE)	9,249	0.04	−0.06	0	±0
Humanist Party (PH)	8,834	0.04	−0.04	0	±0
Revolutionary Workers' Party (POR)	8,667	0.04	±0.00	0	±0
Spanish Phalanx of the CNSO (FE–JONS)	8,000	0.03	−0.09	0	±0
Coalition for a New Socialist Party (CNPS)^{4}	7,991	0.03	−0.03	0	±0
Riojan Party (PR)	7,532	0.03	New	0	±0
Aragonese Union (CHA)	6,344	0.03	+0.01	0	±0
Galician Nationalist Convergence (CNG)	4,663	0.02	New	0	±0
Commoners' Land–Castilian Nationalist Party (TC–PNC)	4,647	0.02	New	0	±0
Galician Alternative (AG)	3,286	0.01	New	0	±0
Spanish Democratic Republican Action (ARDE)	3,063	0.01	+0.01	0	±0
Regionalist Unity of Castile and León (URCL)	2,715	0.01	New	0	±0
Party of El Bierzo (PB)	2,681	0.01	New	0	±0
Extremaduran Regionalist Party (PREx)	2,086	0.01	New	0	±0
Health and Ecology in Solidarity (SEES)	1,959	0.01	New	0	±0
Madrilenian Independent Regional Party (PRIM)^{5}	1,917	0.01	−0.01	0	±0
Gray Panthers of Spain (ACI)	1,644	0.01	New	0	±0
Valencian Nationalist Left (ENV)	1,517	0.01	±0.00	0	±0
Independent Spanish Phalanx (FEI)	1,415	0.01	+0.01	0	±0
People's Palentine Group (APP)	1,410	0.01	New	0	±0
Rainbow (Arcoiris)	1,407	0.01	New	0	±0
The Greens of the Alicantine Country (PVPA)	1,375	0.01	New	0	±0
Cantonal Party (PCAN)	1,300	0.01	New	0	±0
Regionalist Party of the Leonese Country (PREPAL)	1,193	0.01	±0.00	0	±0
Spanish Catholic Movement (MCE)	1,178	0.00	New	0	±0
Tenerife Assembly (ATF)	1,159	0.00	New	0	±0
Socialist Party of the People of Ceuta (PSPC)	1,155	0.00	New	0	±0
Insular Group of Gran Canaria (AIGRANC)	1,009	0.00	New	0	±0
Castilianist Union (UC)	949	0.00	New	0	±0
Andecha Astur (AA)	787	0.00	New	0	±0
Authentic Spanish Phalanx (FEA)	747	0.00	New	0	±0
Alicantine Democratic Union (UniDA)	715	0.00	New	0	±0
Progressive Front of Spain (FPE)	641	0.00	New	0	±0
Union of Autonomies (UDLA)	594	0.00	New	0	±0
Socialist October (OS)	540	0.00	New	0	±0
Independent Council of Asturias (Conceyu)	528	0.00	New	0	±0
Integration Party for Almeria and its Peoples (PIAP)	466	0.00	New	0	±0
Spanish Balearic Alternative (ABE)	416	0.00	New	0	±0
Referendum Tolerant Independent Political Party (PITRCG)	408	0.00	New	0	±0
Party of The People (LG)	385	0.00	New	0	±0
Nationalist Party of Cantabria (PNC)	383	0.00	New	0	±0
Federated Independents of Aragon (IF)	303	0.00	New	0	±0
Radical Balearic Party (PRB)	282	0.00	New	0	±0
Tagoror Party (Tagoror)	278	0.00	±0.00	0	±0
Regionalist Party of Guadalajara (PRGU)	267	0.00	±0.00	0	±0
Social Democratic Spanish Christian Monarchy (MCES)	244	0.00	New	0	±0
Progressive Sorian Union (US)	98	0.00	New	0	±0
Nationalist Party of Castile and León (PANCAL)	70	0.00	−0.01	0	±0
Initiative for Ceuta (INCE)	42	0.00	New	0	±0
Communist Unification of Spain (UCE)	0	0.00	New	0	±0
Coalition for Free Canaries (CCL)	0	0.00	New	0	±0
Centrist Unity–Democratic Spanish Party (PED)	0	0.00	−0.02	0	±0
Freixes Independent Group (Freixes)	0	0.00	New	0	±0
Blank ballots	188,679	0.80	+0.11		
Total	23,591,864			350	±0
Valid votes	23,591,864	99.46	+0.20		
Invalid votes	126,952	0.54	−0.20		
Votes cast / turnout	23,718,816	76.44	+6.70		
Abstentions	7,311,695	23.56	−6.70		
Registered voters	31,030,511				
Sources
Footnotes: ^{1} Spanish Socialist Workers' Party results are compared to the combined totals of Spanish Socialist Workers' Party and Basque Country Left in the 1989 election.; ^{2} Canarian Coalition results are compared to Canarian Independent Groups totals in the 1989 election.; ^{3} The Greens results are compared to the combined totals of Green List and Green Alternative–Ecologist Movement of Catalonia in the 1989 election.; ^{4} Coalition for a New Socialist Party results are compared to Alliance for the Republic totals in the 1989 election.; ^{5} Madrilenian Independent Regional Party results are compared to Regional Party of Madrid totals in the 1989 election.

Popular vote
PSOE	38.78%
PP	34.76%
IU	9.55%
CiU	4.94%
CDS	1.76%
EAJ/PNV	1.24%
CC	0.88%
HB	0.88%
ERC	0.80%
PAR	0.61%
EA–EUE	0.55%
UV	0.48%
Others	3.97%
Blank ballots	0.80%

Seats
PSOE	45.43%
PP	40.29%
IU	5.14%
CiU	4.86%
EAJ/PNV	1.43%
CC	1.14%
HB	0.57%
ERC	0.29%
PAR	0.29%
EA–EUE	0.29%
UV	0.29%

=== Senate ===
← Summary of the 6 June 1993 Senate of Spain election results →
Parties and alliances	Popular vote			Seats	
Parties and alliances	Votes	%	±pp	Total	+/−
Spanish Socialist Workers' Party (PSOE)^{1}	25,441,605	39.02	−1.66	96	−11
People's Party (PP)	22,467,236	34.46	+8.40	93	+15
United Left (IU)	6,172,255	9.47	+0.70	0	−1
Convergence and Union (CiU)	3,458,419	5.30	+0.01	10	±0
Democratic and Social Centre (CDS)	1,189,877	1.82	−5.78	0	−1
Basque Nationalist Party (EAJ/PNV)	846,605	1.30	−0.04	3	−1
Popular Unity (HB)	599,744	0.92	−0.22	1	−2
The Greens (Verdes)^{2}	570,793	0.88	+0.24	0	±0
Aragonese Party (PAR)	465,162	0.71	+0.28	0	±0
Galician Nationalist Bloc (BNG)	402,549	0.62	+0.36	0	±0
Canarian Coalition (CC)^{3}	396,799	0.61	+0.37	5	+1
Basque Solidarity–Basque Left (EA–EuE)	381,356	0.58	−0.14	0	±0
Valencian Union (UV)	347,593	0.53	−0.08	0	±0
Andalusian Party (PA)	312,384	0.48	−0.67	0	±0
Republican Left of Catalonia (ERC)	239,546	0.37	−0.06	0	±0
Ruiz-Mateos Group–European Democratic Alliance (ARM–ADE)	180,139	0.28	−0.43	0	±0
Union for the Progress of Cantabria (UPCA)	144,784	0.22	New	0	±0
Valencian People's Union (UPV)	138,183	0.21	−0.03	0	±0
Andalusian Progress Party (PAP)	133,514	0.20	New	0	±0
The Ecologists (LE)	70,589	0.11	−0.43	0	±0
Liberal Independent Group (GIL)	60,071	0.09	New	0	±0
Leonese People's Union (UPL)	57,797	0.09	New	0	±0
Ecologist Party of Catalonia (PEC)	52,053	0.08	New	0	±0
Alavese Unity (UA)	49,120	0.08	New	0	±0
United Extremadura (EU)	48,113	0.07	−0.01	0	±0
Asturianist Party (PAS)	43,538	0.07	+0.04	0	±0
Workers' Socialist Party (PST)	43,044	0.07	−0.15	0	±0
Nationalists of the Balearic Islands (PSM–ENE)	40,478	0.06	+0.03	0	±0
Communist Party of the Peoples of Spain (PCPE)	35,618	0.05	−0.22	0	±0
Party of Gran Canaria (PGC)	30,285	0.05	New	0	±0
Regionalist Party of Cantabria (PRC)	28,769	0.04	New	0	±0
Aragonese Union (CHA)	28,186	0.04	+0.02	0	±0
Riojan Party (PR)	27,383	0.04	New	0	±0
Majorcan, Menorcan and Pityusic Union (UMMP)	24,450	0.04	New	0	±0
Spanish Phalanx of the CNSO (FE–JONS)	22,845	0.04	−0.09	0	±0
Commoners' Land–Castilian Nationalist Party (TC–PNC)	17,953	0.03	New	0	±0
Galician Nationalist Convergence (CNG)	16,405	0.03	New	0	±0
Coalition for a New Socialist Party (CNPS)^{4}	13,733	0.02	−0.02	0	±0
Regionalist Unity of Castile and León (URCL)	13,041	0.02	New	0	±0
Regionalist Party of the Leonese Country (PREPAL)	12,147	0.02	−0.01	0	±0
Spanish Democratic Republican Action (ARDE)	11,830	0.02	+0.01	0	±0
Humanist Party (PH)	11,176	0.02	−0.05	0	±0
Galician Alternative (AG)	10,849	0.02	New	0	±0
Independent Spanish Phalanx (FEI)	10,768	0.02	+0.02	0	±0
Madrilenian Independent Regional Party (PRIM)^{5}	10,713	0.02	−0.02	0	±0
Gray Panthers of Spain (ACI)	10,681	0.02	New	0	±0
Revolutionary Workers' Party (POR)	10,258	0.02	+0.01	0	±0
Extremaduran Regionalist Party (PREx)	10,253	0.02	New	0	±0
Green Social Unity (USV)	9,802	0.02	New	0	±0
Spanish Vertex Ecological Development Revindication (VERDE)	9,704	0.01	−0.17	0	±0
Spanish Catholic Movement (MCE)	9,507	0.01	−0.02	0	±0
Rainbow (Arcoiris)	5,419	0.01	New	0	±0
Party of El Bierzo (PB)	5,151	0.01	New	0	±0
People's Palentine Group (APP)	4,869	0.01	New	0	±0
Valencian Nationalist Left (ENV)	4,617	0.01	±0.00	0	±0
The Greens of the Alicantine Country (PVPA)	4,439	0.01	New	0	±0
Natural Law Party (PLN)	4,422	0.01	New	0	±0
Cantonal Party (PCAN)	4,333	0.01	New	0	±0
Federal Socialist Party (PSF)	4,168	0.01	New	0	±0
Health and Ecology in Solidarity (SEES)	4,083	0.01	New	0	±0
Centrist Unity–Democratic Spanish Party (PED)	4,047	0.01	±0.00	0	±0
Alicantine Democratic Union (UniDA)	3,611	0.01	New	0	±0
Authentic Spanish Phalanx (FEA)	3,408	0.01	New	0	±0
Andecha Astur (AA)	3,068	0.00	New	0	±0
Castilianist Union (UC)	3,013	0.00	New	0	±0
Tenerife Assembly (ATF)	2,638	0.00	New	0	±0
Spanish Action (AE)	2,595	0.00	±0.00	0	±0
Independent Council of Asturias (Conceyu)	2,326	0.00	New	0	±0
Navarrese Regionalists (RN)	2,213	0.00	New	0	±0
Insular Group of Gran Canaria (AIGRANC)	2,098	0.00	New	0	±0
Socialist Party of the People of Ceuta (PSPC)	1,961	0.00	New	0	±0
Socialist October (OS)	1,751	0.00	New	0	±0
Regionalist Party of Guadalajara (PRGU)	1,641	0.00	±0.00	0	±0
Nationalist Party of Cantabria (PNC)	1,566	0.00	New	0	±0
Natural Culture (CN)	1,557	0.00	−0.01	0	±0
Blue Party of Progressive Rightwing (PADP)	1,086	0.00	New	0	±0
Integration Party for Almeria and its Peoples (PIAP)	1,026	0.00	New	0	±0
Tagoror Party (Tagoror)	1,016	0.00	±0.00	0	±0
Social Democratic Spanish Christian Monarchy (MCES)	1,009	0.00	New	0	±0
Federated Independents of Aragon (IF)	842	0.00	New	0	±0
Spanish Balearic Alternative (ABE)	717	0.00	New	0	±0
Referendum Tolerant Independent Political Party (PITRCG)	583	0.00	New	0	±0
Proverist Party (PPr)	467	0.00	±0.00	0	±0
Radical Balearic Party (PRB)	460	0.00	±0.00	0	±0
Nationalist Party of Castile and León (PANCAL)	352	0.00	−0.02	0	±0
Progressive Sorian Union (US)	347	0.00	New	0	±0
Initiative for Ceuta (INCE)	70	0.00	New	0	±0
Communist Unification of Spain (UCE)	0	0.00	New	0	±0
Freixes Independent Group (Freixes)	0	0.00	New	0	±0
Blank ballots (Note: The percentage of blank ballots is calculated over the official number of valid votes cast, irrespective of the total number of votes shown as a result of adding up the individual results for each party.)	376,829	1.63	−0.04		
Total	65,203,500			208	±0
Valid votes	23,189,174	97.70	+1.13		
Invalid votes	546,821	2.30	−1.13		
Votes cast / turnout	23,735,995	76.49	+6.62		
Abstentions	7,294,516	23.51	−6.62		
Registered voters	31,030,511				
Sources
Footnotes: ^{1} Spanish Socialist Workers' Party results are compared to the combined totals of Spanish Socialist Workers' Party and Basque Country Left in the 1989 election.; ^{2} The Greens results are compared to the combined totals of Green List and Green Alternative–Ecologist Movement of Catalonia in the 1989 election.; ^{3} Canarian Coalition results are compared to the combined totals of Canarian Independent Groups, Lanzarote Independents Group, Majorera Assembly and Independent Herrenian Group in the 1989 election.; ^{4} Coalition for a New Socialist Party results are compared to Alliance for the Republic totals in the 1989 election.; ^{5} Madrilenian Independent Regional Party results are compared to Regional Party of Madrid totals in the 1989 election.

Popular vote
PSOE	39.02%
PP	34.46%
IU	9.47%
CiU	5.30%
CDS	1.82%
EAJ/PNV	1.30%
HB	0.92%
CC	0.61%
Others	6.52%
Blank ballots	1.63%

Seats
PSOE	46.15%
PP	44.71%
CiU	4.81%
CC	2.40%
EAJ/PNV	1.44%
HB	0.48%

=== Maps ===
Election results by constituency (Congress).

Vote winner strength by constituency (Congress).

Vote winner strength by autonomous community (Congress).

== Aftermath ==
=== Government formation ===
Investiture; Congress of Deputies; Nomination of Felipe González (PSOE)
Ballot →	9 July 1993
Required majority →	176 out of 350
Yes: • PSOE (159); • CiU (17); • PNV (5)	181 / 350
No: • PP (141); • IU–IC (17); • CC (4); • ERC (1); • EA (1); • UV (1)	165 / 350
Abstentions: • PAR (1)	1 / 350
Absentees: • HB (2); • IU–IC (1)	3 / 350

== Bibliography ==
Legislation

- Constitución Española (Constitution). Official State Gazette (in Spanish). 27 December 1978 [version as of 28 August 1992]. BOE-A-1978-31229.
- Ley Orgánica 5/1985, de 19 de junio, del Régimen Electoral General (Organic Law 5/1985). Official State Gazette (in Spanish). 19 June 1985 [version as of 3 November 1992]. BOE-A-1985-11672.
- Ley 2/1992, de 28 de febrero, por la que pasan a denominarse oficialmente Girona y Lleida las provincias de Gerona y Lérida (Law 2/1992). Official State Gazette (in Spanish). 28 February 1992. BOE-A-1992-4904.
- Real Decreto 534/1993, de 12 de abril, de disolución del Congreso de los Diputados y del Senado y de convocatoria de elecciones (Royal Decree 534/1993). Official State Gazette (in Spanish). 12 April 1993. BOE-A-1993-9513.

Other

- Fernández-Miranda Campoamor, Carmen (1994). "Elecciones legislativas españolas de 6 de junio de 1993". Revista de Derecho Político (in Spanish) (39). Madrid: National University of Distance Education: 263–289. doi:10.5944/rdp.39.1994.8637. ISSN 0211-979X.
- Carreras de Odriozola, Albert; Tafunell Sambola, Xavier (2005) [1989]. Estadísticas históricas de España, siglos XIX-XX (PDF) (in Spanish). Vol. 1 (II ed.). Bilbao: Fundación BBVA. pp. 1072–1097. ISBN 84-96515-00-1. Archived from the original (PDF) on 24 September 2015.
