= Jaén (Congress of Deputies constituency) =

Electoral constituency in Spain

Coordinates: 38°00′N 3°30′W

- Congress of Deputies; Electoral constituency
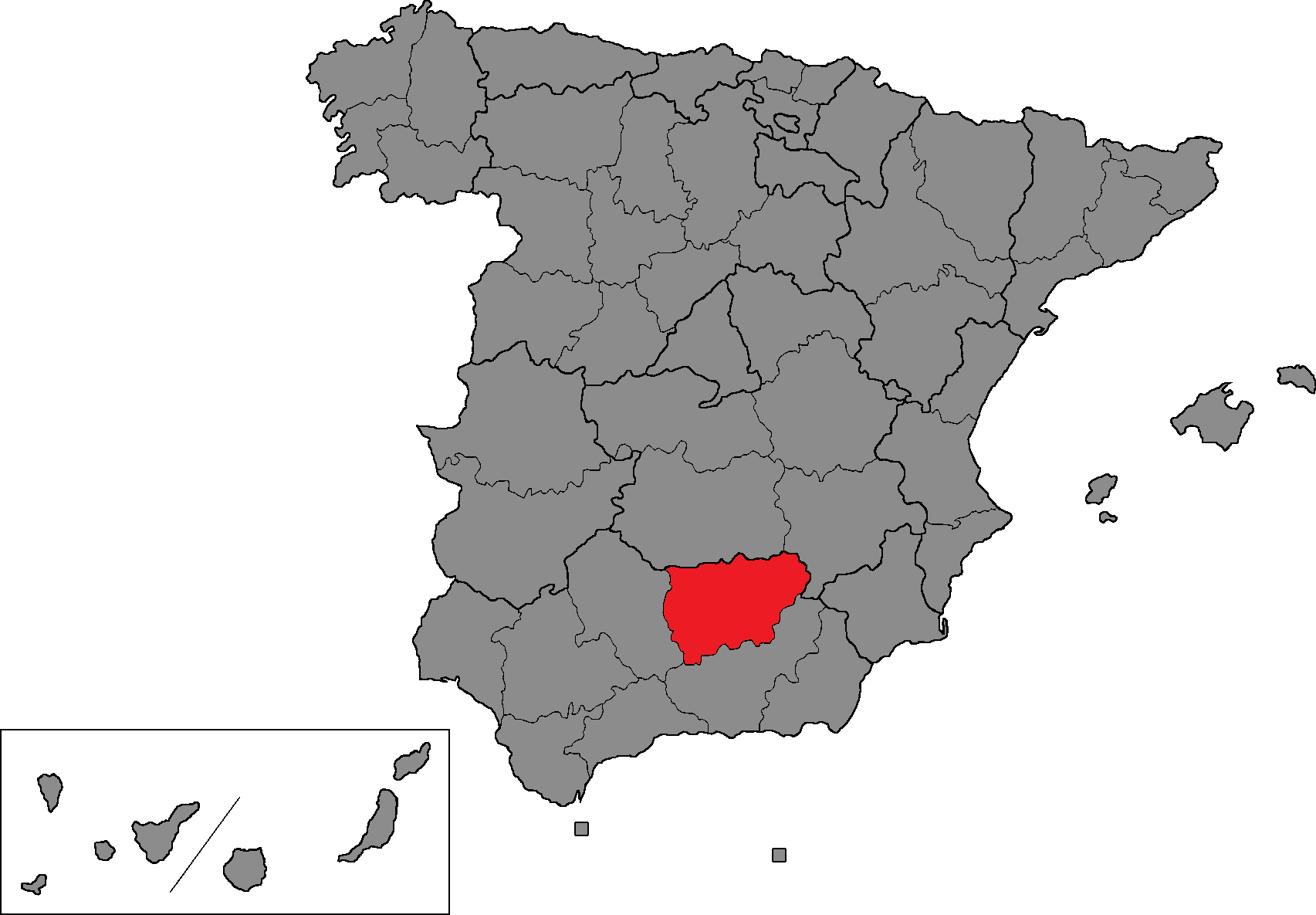
- Location of Jaén within Spain
- Province: Jaén
- Autonomous community: Andalusia
- Population: ▼618,678 (2024)
- Electorate: ▼518,371 (2023)
- Major settlements: Jaén, Linares

Current constituency
- Created: 1977
- Seats: 7 (1977–1986); 6 (1986–2015); 5 (2015–present)
- Members: PP (2); PSOE (2); Vox (1)

Jaén is one of the 52 constituencies represented in the Congress of Deputies, the lower chamber of the Spanish parliament, the Cortes Generales. The constituency (whose boundaries correspond to those of the homonymous province) currently elects five deputies. The electoral system uses the D'Hondt method and closed-list proportional voting, with a minimum threshold of three percent.

== Electoral system ==
The constituency was created as per the Political Reform Law and was first contested in the 1977 general election. The Law provided for the provinces of Spain to be established as multi-member districts in the Congress of Deputies, with this regulation being maintained under the Spanish Constitution of 1978. Additionally, the Constitution requires for any modification of the provincial limits to be approved under an organic law, needing an absolute majority in the Cortes Generales.

Voting is based on universal suffrage, comprising all Spanish nationals over 18 years of age with full political rights, provided that they have not been deprived of the right to vote by a final sentence. The only exception was in 1977, when this was limited to nationals over 21 years of age and in full enjoyment of their political and civil rights. Amendments in 2011 required non-resident citizens to apply for voting, a system known as "begged" voting (Spanish: Voto rogado). which was abolished in 2022. Further, amendments in 2018 granted the right to vote to those legally incapacitated. The Congress of Deputies has a minimum of 300 and a maximum of 400 seats, with electoral provisions fixing its size at 350. Of these, 348 are elected in 50 multi-member constituencies corresponding to the provinces of Spain—each of which is assigned an initial minimum of two seats and the remaining 248 distributed in proportion to population—using the D'Hondt method and closed-list proportional voting, with a three percent-threshold of valid votes (including blank ballots) in each constituency. The remaining two seats are allocated to Ceuta and Melilla as single-member districts elected by plurality voting. The use of this electoral method may result in a higher effective threshold depending on district magnitude and vote distribution. The law does not provide for by-elections to fill vacant seats; instead, any vacancies arising after the proclamation of candidates and during the legislative term are filled by the next candidates on the party lists or, when required, by designated substitutes.

The electoral law allows for parties and federations registered in the interior ministry, alliances and groupings of electors to present lists of candidates. Parties and federations intending to form an alliance are required to inform the relevant electoral commission within 10 days of the election call—15 before 1985—whereas groupings of electors need to secure the signature of at least one percent of the electorate in the constituencies for which they seek election—one permille of the electorate, with a compulsory minimum of 500 signatures, until 1985—disallowing electors from signing for more than one list. Also since 2011, parties, federations or alliances that have not obtained a mandate in either chamber of the Cortes at the preceding election are required to secure the signature of at least 0.1 percent of electors in the aforementioned constituencies. Amendments in 2007 required a balanced composition of men and women in the electoral lists, so that candidates of either sex made up at least 40 percent of the total composition; further amendments in 2024 required the use of a zipper system.

== Deputies ==
Deputies 1977–present
Key to parties PCE U.Podemos PSOE Cs UCD PP CP AP Vox
Legislature	Election	Distribution
Constituent	1977	4 / 3
1st	1979	1 / 3 / 3
2nd	1982	5 / 2
3rd	1986	4 / 2
4th	1989	4 / 2
5th	1993	4 / 2
6th	1996	3 / 3
7th	2000	3 / 3
8th	2004	4 / 2
9th	2008	4 / 2
10th	2011	3 / 3
11th	2015	3 / 2
12th	2016	1 / 2 / 2
13th	2019 (Apr)	3 / 1 / 1
14th	2019 (Nov)	3 / 1 / 1
15th	2023	2 / 2 / 1

== General elections ==
=== 2026 ===
Summary of the 29 November 2026 Congress of Deputies election results in Jaén
Parties and alliances	Popular vote			Seats	
Parties and alliances	Votes	%	±pp	Total	+/−
People's Party (PP)					
Spanish Socialist Workers' Party (PSOE)					
Vox (Vox)					
Andalusian Broad Front (FA)^{1}			n/a		
We Can (Podemos)^{1}			n/a		
Animalist Party with the Environment (PACMA)					
Workers' Front (FO)					
For a Fairer World (M+J)					
Forward Andalusia (Adelante Andalucía)			New		
Communist Party of the Workers of Spain (PCTE)			New		
The Party is Over (SALF)			New		
Blank ballots					
Total				5	±0
Valid votes					
Invalid votes					
Votes cast / turnout					
Abstentions					
Registered voters	515,524				
Sources
Footnotes: ^{1} Within the Unite Andalusia alliance in the 2023 election.

=== 2023 ===
Summary of the 23 July 2023 Congress of Deputies election results in Jaén
Parties and alliances	Popular vote			Seats	
Parties and alliances	Votes	%	±pp	Total	+/−
People's Party (PP)	137,617	37.32	+14.85	2	+1
Spanish Socialist Workers' Party (PSOE)	133,819	36.29	–2.53	2	–1
Vox (Vox)	54,400	14.75	–4.96	1	±0
Unite Andalusia (Sumar)^{1}	29,461	7.99	–1.86	0	±0
Jaén Deserves More (JM+)	8,293	2.25	New	0	±0
Animalist Party with the Environment (PACMA)^{2}	1,671	0.45	–0.31	0	±0
Workers' Front (FO)	410	0.11	New	0	±0
For a Fairer World (PUM+J)	360	0.10	–0.01	0	±0
Zero Cuts (Recortes Cero)	203	0.06	–0.07	0	±0
Blank ballots	2,497	0.68	–0.24		
Total	368,731			5	±0
Valid votes	368,731	98.68	+0.28		
Invalid votes	4,926	1.32	–0.28		
Votes cast / turnout	373,657	72.08	+1.63		
Abstentions	144,714	27.92	–1.63		
Registered voters	518,371				
Sources
Footnotes: ^{1} Unite Andalusia results are compared to United We Can totals in the November 2019 election.; ^{2} Animalist Party with the Environment results are compared to Animalist Party Against Mistreatment of Animals totals in the November 2019 election.

=== November 2019 ===
Summary of the 10 November 2019 Congress of Deputies election results in Jaén
Parties and alliances	Popular vote			Seats	
Parties and alliances	Votes	%	±pp	Total	+/−
Spanish Socialist Workers' Party (PSOE)	141,737	38.82	–0.71	3	±0
People's Party (PP)	82,055	22.47	+2.86	1	±0
Vox (Vox)	71,950	19.71	+7.58	1	+1
United We Can (Podemos–IULV–CA)	35,962	9.85	–0.72	0	±0
Citizens–Party of the Citizenry (Cs)	24,816	6.80	–9.07	0	–1
Animalist Party Against Mistreatment of Animals (PACMA)	2,766	0.76	–0.11	0	±0
Andalusia by Herself (AxSí)	856	0.23	+0.09	0	±0
Communist Party of the Workers of Spain (PCTE)	471	0.13	New	0	±0
Zero Cuts–Green Group (Recortes Cero–GV)	464	0.13	+0.03	0	±0
For a Fairer World (PUM+J)	419	0.11	+0.03	0	±0
Andalusian Solidary Independent Republican Party (RISA)	249	0.07	+0.02	0	±0
Blank ballots	3,361	0.92	+0.27		
Total	365,106			5	±0
Valid votes	365,106	98.40	–0.28		
Invalid votes	5,937	1.60	+0.28		
Votes cast / turnout	371,043	70.45	–3.96		
Abstentions	155,616	29.55	+3.96		
Registered voters	526,659				

=== April 2019 ===
Summary of the 28 April 2019 Congress of Deputies election results in Jaén
Parties and alliances	Popular vote			Seats	
Parties and alliances	Votes	%	±pp	Total	+/−
Spanish Socialist Workers' Party (PSOE)	152,932	39.53	+2.14	3	+1
People's Party (PP)	75,885	19.61	–15.79	1	–1
Citizens–Party of the Citizenry (Cs)	61,413	15.87	+5.38	1	+1
Vox (Vox)	46,934	12.13	+11.96	0	±0
United We Can (Podemos–IULV–CA–Equo)	40,880	10.57	–3.79	0	–1
Animalist Party Against Mistreatment of Animals (PACMA)	3,369	0.87	±0.00	0	±0
United Linares Independent Citizens (CILU–Linares)	1,081	0.28	New	0	±0
Andalusia by Herself (AxSí)	545	0.14	New	0	±0
Communist Party of the Andalusian People (PCPA)	437	0.11	–0.02	0	±0
Zero Cuts–Green Group (Recortes Cero–GV)	401	0.10	–0.02	0	±0
For a Fairer World (PUM+J)	325	0.08	New	0	±0
Andalusian Solidary Independent Republican Party (RISA)	190	0.05	New	0	±0
Blank ballots	2,524	0.65	–0.04		
Total	386,916			5	±0
Valid votes	386,916	98.68	–0.17		
Invalid votes	5,169	1.32	+0.17		
Votes cast / turnout	392,085	74.41	+3.93		
Abstentions	134,826	25.59	–3.93		
Registered voters	526,911				

=== 2016 ===
Summary of the 26 June 2016 Congress of Deputies election results in Jaén
Parties and alliances	Popular vote			Seats	
Parties and alliances	Votes	%	±pp	Total	+/−
Spanish Socialist Workers' Party (PSOE)	138,612	37.39	–0.94	2	–1
People's Party (PP)	131,234	35.40	+3.92	2	±0
United We Can for Andalusia (Podemos–IU–Equo)^{1}	53,239	14.36	–2.52	1	+1
Citizens–Party of the Citizenry (C's)	38,884	10.49	–0.19	0	±0
Animalist Party Against Mistreatment of Animals (PACMA)	3,238	0.87	+0.21	0	±0
United Free Citizens (CILUS)	830	0.22	–0.09	0	±0
Vox (Vox)	638	0.17	–0.01	0	±0
Union, Progress and Democracy (UPyD)	589	0.16	–0.17	0	±0
Communist Party of the Peoples of Spain (PCPE)	498	0.13	+0.01	0	±0
Zero Cuts–Green Group (Recortes Cero–GV)	455	0.12	+0.02	0	±0
Blank ballots	2,545	0.69	–0.01		
Total	370,762			5	±0
Valid votes	370,762	98.85	–0.16		
Invalid votes	4,320	1.15	+0.16		
Votes cast / turnout	375,082	70.48	–2.85		
Abstentions	157,129	29.52	+2.85		
Registered voters	532,211				
Sources
Footnotes: ^{1} United We Can results are compared to the combined totals of We Can and United Left/Greens–Assembly for Andalusia–Popular Unity in Common in the 2015 election.

=== 2015 ===
Summary of the 20 December 2015 Congress of Deputies election results in Jaén
Parties and alliances	Popular vote			Seats	
Parties and alliances	Votes	%	±pp	Total	+/−
Spanish Socialist Workers' Party (PSOE)	148,511	38.33	–2.65	3	±0
People's Party (PP)	121,984	31.48	–13.96	2	–1
We Can (Podemos)	48,640	12.55	New	0	±0
Citizens–Party of the Citizenry (C's)	41,398	10.68	New	0	±0
United Left/Greens–Assembly for Andalusia–Popular Unity (IULV–CA–UPeC)	16,771	4.33	–2.62	0	±0
Animalist Party Against Mistreatment of Animals (PACMA)	2,543	0.66	New	0	±0
Union, Progress and Democracy (UPyD)	1,287	0.33	–3.07	0	±0
United Free Citizens (CILUS)	1,189	0.31	New	0	±0
Vox (Vox)	715	0.18	New	0	±0
Andalusians of Jaén United (AJU)	711	0.18	New	0	±0
Communist Party of the Peoples of Spain (PCPE)	469	0.12	New	0	±0
Zero Cuts–Green Group (Recortes Cero–GV)	371	0.10	New	0	±0
Internationalist Solidarity and Self-Management (SAIn)	198	0.05	–0.06	0	±0
Blank ballots	2,713	0.70	–0.32		
Total	387,500			5	–1
Valid votes	387,500	99.01	+0.02		
Invalid votes	3,886	0.99	–0.02		
Votes cast / turnout	391,386	73.33	–2.56		
Abstentions	142,362	26.67	+2.56		
Registered voters	533,748				

=== 2011 ===
Summary of the 20 November 2011 Congress of Deputies election results in Jaén
Parties and alliances	Popular vote			Seats	
Parties and alliances	Votes	%	±pp	Total	+/−
People's Party (PP)	183,339	45.44	+8.94	3	+1
Spanish Socialist Workers' Party (PSOE)	165,348	40.98	–14.50	3	–1
United Left/The Greens–Assembly for Andalusia: Plural Left (IULV–CA)	28,059	6.95	+2.16	0	±0
Union, Progress and Democracy (UPyD)	13,727	3.40	+2.93	0	±0
Andalusian Party (PA)^{1}	4,920	1.22	+0.10	0	±0
Equo (Equo)	2,149	0.53	New	0	±0
Regionalist Party for Eastern Andalusia (PRAO)	911	0.23	New	0	±0
Internationalist Solidarity and Self-Management (SAIn)	454	0.11	+0.04	0	±0
Communist Unification of Spain (UCE)	412	0.10	New	0	±0
Blank ballots	4,124	1.02	+0.24		
Total	403,443			6	±0
Valid votes	403,443	98.99	–0.45		
Invalid votes	4,130	1.01	+0.45		
Votes cast / turnout	407,573	75.89	–2.72		
Abstentions	129,463	24.11	+2.72		
Registered voters	537,036				
Sources
Footnotes: ^{1} Andalusian Party results are compared to Andalusian Coalition totals in the 2008 election.

=== 2008 ===
Summary of the 9 March 2008 Congress of Deputies election results in Jaén
Parties and alliances	Popular vote			Seats	
Parties and alliances	Votes	%	±pp	Total	+/−
Spanish Socialist Workers' Party (PSOE)	230,026	55.48	+1.07	4	±0
People's Party (PP)	151,340	36.50	+2.39	2	±0
United Left/The Greens–Assembly for Andalusia–Alternative (IULV–CA)	19,859	4.79	–1.04	0	±0
Andalusian Coalition (CA)^{1}	4,637	1.12	–2.82	0	±0
Union, Progress and Democracy (UPyD)	1,958	0.47	New	0	±0
The Greens (Verdes)	647	0.16	New	0	±0
Social Democratic Party (PSD)	458	0.11	New	0	±0
Anti-Bullfighting Party Against Mistreatment of Animals (PACMA)	413	0.10	New	0	±0
Communist Party of the Peoples of Spain (PCPE)	368	0.09	+0.09	0	±0
Internationalist Solidarity and Self-Management (SAIn)	291	0.07	New	0	±0
Citizens for Blank Votes (CenB)	246	0.06	–0.03	0	±0
Citizens–Party of the Citizenry (C's)	201	0.05	New	0	±0
For a Fairer World (PUM+J)	200	0.05	New	0	±0
Spanish Phalanx of the CNSO (FE de las JONS)	182	0.04	+0.01	0	±0
National Democracy (DN)	137	0.03	±0.00	0	±0
Humanist Party (PH)	124	0.03	–0.09	0	±0
Family and Life Party (PFyV)	107	0.03	–0.02	0	±0
Spain 2000 (E–2000)	106	0.03	±0.00	0	±0
Spanish Alternative (AES)	83	0.02	New	0	±0
Blank ballots	3,223	0.78	–0.40		
Total	414,606			6	±0
Valid votes	414,606	99.44	+0.08		
Invalid votes	2,319	0.56	–0.08		
Votes cast / turnout	416,925	78.61	–1.79		
Abstentions	113,417	21.39	+1.79		
Registered voters	530,342				
Sources
Footnotes: ^{1} Andalusian Coalition results are compared to the combined totals of Andalusian Party and Socialist Party of Andalusia in the 2004 election.

=== 2004 ===
Summary of the 14 March 2004 Congress of Deputies election results in Jaén
Parties and alliances	Popular vote			Seats	
Parties and alliances	Votes	%	±pp	Total	+/−
Spanish Socialist Workers' Party (PSOE)	228,611	54.41	+6.66	4	+1
People's Party (PP)	143,288	34.11	–6.22	2	–1
United Left/The Greens–Assembly for Andalusia (IULV–CA)	24,483	5.83	–1.28	0	±0
Andalusian Party (PA)	15,493	3.69	+0.43	0	±0
Socialist Party of Andalusia (PSA)	1,068	0.25	New	0	±0
Humanist Party (PH)	507	0.12	+0.07	0	±0
Citizens for Blank Votes (CenB)	380	0.09	New	0	±0
Democratic and Social Centre (CDS)	225	0.05	+0.01	0	±0
Family and Life Party (PFyV)	221	0.05	New	0	±0
Andalusia Assembly (A)	201	0.05	+0.01	0	±0
Republican Left (IR)	150	0.04	New	0	±0
National Democracy (DN)	134	0.03	New	0	±0
Spanish Phalanx of the CNSO (FE de las JONS)^{1}	134	0.03	+0.01	0	±0
Spain 2000 (E–2000)	109	0.03	±0.00	0	±0
The Phalanx (FE)	105	0.02	–0.03	0	±0
Republican Social Movement (MSR)	72	0.02	New	0	±0
Communist Party of the Peoples of Spain (PCPE)	0	0.00	–0.09	0	±0
Blank ballots	4,951	1.18	+0.17		
Total	420,132			6	±0
Valid votes	420,132	99.36	+0.02		
Invalid votes	2,725	0.64	–0.02		
Votes cast / turnout	422,857	80.40	+3.68		
Abstentions	103,098	19.60	–3.68		
Registered voters	525,955				
Sources
Footnotes: ^{1} Spanish Phalanx of the CNSO results are compared to Independent Spanish Phalanx–Phalanx 2000 totals in the 2000 election.

=== 2000 ===
Summary of the 12 March 2000 Congress of Deputies election results in Jaén
Parties and alliances	Popular vote			Seats	
Parties and alliances	Votes	%	±pp	Total	+/−
Spanish Socialist Workers' Party–Progressives (PSOE–p)	190,958	47.75	–0.93	3	±0
People's Party (PP)	161,285	40.33	+3.44	3	±0
United Left/The Greens–Assembly for Andalusia (IULV–CA)	28,450	7.11	–4.61	0	±0
Andalusian Party (PA)	13,038	3.26	+1.56	0	±0
Andalusian Left (IA)	437	0.11	New	0	±0
Communist Party of the Peoples of Spain (PCPE)	349	0.09	–0.02	0	±0
Andalusian Nation (NA)	250	0.06	±0.00	0	±0
The Phalanx (FE)	196	0.05	New	0	±0
Humanist Party (PH)	186	0.05	+0.01	0	±0
Natural Law Party (PLN)	168	0.04	New	0	±0
Andalusia Assembly (A)	150	0.04	New	0	±0
Centrist Union–Democratic and Social Centre (UC–CDS)	146	0.04	–0.04	0	±0
Spanish Democratic Party (PADE)	102	0.03	New	0	±0
Spain 2000 Platform (ES2000)	102	0.03	New	0	±0
Independent Spanish Phalanx–Phalanx 2000 (FEI–FE 2000)	99	0.02	New	0	±0
Blank ballots	4,033	1.01	+0.39		
Total	399,949			6	±0
Valid votes	399,949	99.34	–0.17		
Invalid votes	2,676	0.66	+0.17		
Votes cast / turnout	402,625	76.72	–6.97		
Abstentions	122,188	23.28	+6.97		
Registered voters	524,813				

=== 1996 ===
Summary of the 3 March 1996 Congress of Deputies election results in Jaén
Parties and alliances	Popular vote			Seats	
Parties and alliances	Votes	%	±pp	Total	+/−
Spanish Socialist Workers' Party of Andalusia (PSOE–A)	205,818	48.68	–3.91	3	–1
People's Party (PP)	155,947	36.89	+4.46	3	+1
United Left/The Greens–Assembly for Andalusia (IULV–CA)	49,564	11.72	+1.39	0	±0
Andalusian Party (PA)^{1}	7,200	1.70	–0.45	0	±0
Communist Party of the Andalusian People (PCPA)	461	0.11	–0.02	0	±0
Centrist Union (UC)	354	0.08	–0.78	0	±0
Andalusian Nation (NA)	236	0.06	New	0	±0
Authentic Spanish Phalanx (FEA)	218	0.05	New	0	±0
Workers' Revolutionary Party (PRT)	182	0.04	New	0	±0
Humanist Party (PH)	171	0.04	+0.02	0	±0
Blank ballots	2,639	0.62	+0.20		
Total	422,790			6	±0
Valid votes	422,790	99.51	–0.14		
Invalid votes	2,076	0.49	+0.14		
Votes cast / turnout	424,866	83.69	+2.70		
Abstentions	82,800	16.31	–2.70		
Registered voters	507,666				
Sources
Footnotes: ^{1} Andalusian Party results are compared to the combined totals of Andalusian Party and Andalusian Progress Party in the 1993 election.

=== 1993 ===
Summary of the 6 June 1993 Congress of Deputies election results in Jaén
Parties and alliances	Popular vote			Seats	
Parties and alliances	Votes	%	±pp	Total	+/−
Spanish Socialist Workers' Party of Andalusia (PSOE–A)	210,306	52.59	–1.53	4	±0
People's Party (PP)	129,705	32.43	+8.10	2	±0
United Left–Assembly for Andalusia (IU–CA)	41,311	10.33	–1.20	0	±0
Andalusian Party (PA)	7,211	1.80	–0.67	0	±0
Democratic and Social Centre (CDS)	3,455	0.86	–3.95	0	±0
The Greens of Andalusia (Verdes)^{1}	1,602	0.40	+0.03	0	±0
Andalusian Progress Party (PAP)	1,380	0.35	New	0	±0
Liberal Independent Group (GIL)	735	0.18	New	0	±0
The Ecologists (LE)	607	0.15	–0.19	0	±0
Socialist October (OS)	540	0.14	New	0	±0
Communist Party of the Andalusian People (PCPA)	526	0.13	–0.17	0	±0
Ruiz-Mateos Group–European Democratic Alliance (ARM–ADE)	324	0.08	–0.62	0	±0
Spanish Phalanx of the CNSO (FE–JONS)	221	0.06	–0.03	0	±0
Coalition for a New Socialist Party (CNPS)^{2}	128	0.03	–0.03	0	±0
Natural Law Party (PLN)	98	0.02	New	0	±0
Humanist Party (PH)	80	0.02	–0.03	0	±0
Communist Unification of Spain (UCE)	0	0.00	New	0	±0
Blank ballots	1,683	0.42	+0.10		
Total	399,912			6	±0
Valid votes	399,912	99.65	+0.43		
Invalid votes	1,397	0.35	–0.43		
Votes cast / turnout	401,309	80.99	+4.57		
Abstentions	94,204	19.01	–4.57		
Registered voters	495,513				
Sources
Footnotes: ^{1} The Greens of Andalusia results are compared to The Greens–Green List totals in the 1989 election.; ^{2} Coalition for a New Socialist Party results are compared to Alliance for the Republic totals in the 1989 election.

=== 1989 ===
Summary of the 29 October 1989 Congress of Deputies election results in Jaén
Parties and alliances	Popular vote			Seats	
Parties and alliances	Votes	%	±pp	Total	+/−
Spanish Socialist Workers' Party of Andalusia (PSOE–A)	197,733	54.12	–0.97	4	±0
People's Party (PP)^{1}	88,906	24.33	–2.57	2	±0
United Left–Assembly for Andalusia (IU–CA)	42,112	11.53	+2.35	0	±0
Democratic and Social Centre (CDS)	17,576	4.81	–0.52	0	±0
Andalusian Party (PA)	9,010	2.47	+3.44	0	±0
Ruiz-Mateos Group (Ruiz-Mateos)	2,540	0.70	New	0	±0
The Greens–Green List (LV–LV)	1,369	0.37	New	0	±0
The Ecologist Greens (LVE)	1,231	0.34	New	0	±0
Workers' Socialist Party (PST)	1,139	0.31	New	0	±0
Communist Party of the Andalusian People (PCPA)	1,089	0.30	New	0	±0
Workers' Party of Spain–Communist Unity (PTE–UC)^{2}	777	0.21	–0.35	0	±0
Spanish Phalanx of the CNSO (FE–JONS)	345	0.09	–0.06	0	±0
Alliance for the Republic (AxR)^{3}	203	0.06	–0.03	0	±0
Humanist Party (PH)	166	0.05	New	0	±0
Blank ballots	1,171	0.32	±0.00		
Total	365,367			6	±0
Valid votes	365,367	99.22	+0.34		
Invalid votes	2,858	0.78	–0.34		
Votes cast / turnout	368,225	76.42	+0.52		
Abstentions	113,620	23.58	–0.52		
Registered voters	481,845				
Sources
Footnotes: ^{1} People's Party results are compared to People's Coalition totals in the 1986 election.; ^{2} Workers' Party of Spain–Communist Unity results are compared to Communists' Unity Board totals in the 1986 election.; ^{3} Alliance for the Republic results are compared to Internationalist Socialist Workers' Party totals in the 1986 election.

=== 1986 ===
Summary of the 22 June 1986 Congress of Deputies election results in Jaén
Parties and alliances	Popular vote			Seats	
Parties and alliances	Votes	%	±pp	Total	+/−
Spanish Socialist Workers' Party (PSOE)	201,494	55.09	–2.03	4	–1
People's Coalition (AP–PDP–PL)^{1}	98,395	26.90	+3.85	2	±0
United Left (IU)^{2}	33,569	9.18	+1.80	0	±0
Democratic and Social Centre (CDS)	19,507	5.33	+4.41	0	±0
Andalusian Party (PA)	4,483	1.23	–0.08	0	±0
Democratic Reformist Party (PRD)	2,569	0.70	New	0	±0
Communists' Unity Board (MUC)	2,042	0.56	New	0	±0
Socialist Party of the Andalusian People (PSPA)	976	0.27	New	0	±0
Spanish Phalanx of the CNSO (FE–JONS)	534	0.15	+0.15	0	±0
Communist Unification of Spain (UCE)	390	0.11	+0.05	0	±0
Internationalist Socialist Workers' Party (POSI)	338	0.09	New	0	±0
Republican Popular Unity (UPR)	316	0.09	New	0	±0
Party of the Communists of Catalonia (PCC)	0	0.00	New	0	±0
Blank ballots	1,171	0.32	+0.15		
Total	365,784			6	–1
Valid votes	365,784	98.88	–0.13		
Invalid votes	4,141	1.12	+0.13		
Votes cast / turnout	369,925	75.90	–6.00		
Abstentions	117,439	24.10	+6.00		
Registered voters	487,364				
Sources
Footnotes: ^{1} People's Coalition results are compared to People's Alliance–People's Democratic Party totals in the 1982 election.; ^{2} United Left results are compared to Communist Party of Andalusia totals in the 1982 election.

=== 1982 ===
Summary of the 28 October 1982 Congress of Deputies election results in Jaén
Parties and alliances	Popular vote			Seats	
Parties and alliances	Votes	%	±pp	Total	+/−
Spanish Socialist Workers' Party of Andalusia (PSA–PSOE)	207,754	57.12	+15.23	5	+2
People's Alliance–People's Democratic Party (AP–PDP)^{1}	83,833	23.05	+19.48	2	+2
Union of the Democratic Centre (UCD)	32,456	8.92	–24.87	0	–3
Communist Party of Andalusia (PCA–PCE)	26,829	7.38	–5.52	0	–1
Socialist Party of Andalusia–Andalusian Party (PSA–PA)	4,750	1.31	–2.13	0	±0
Democratic and Social Centre (CDS)	3,363	0.92	New	0	±0
New Force (FN)^{2}	1,789	0.49	–2.33	0	±0
Workers' Socialist Party (PST)	986	0.27	New	0	±0
Communist Unity Candidacy (CUC)^{3}	425	0.12	–0.06	0	±0
Falangist Movement of Spain (MFE)	285	0.08	New	0	±0
Spanish Agrarian Party (PAE)	222	0.06	New	0	±0
Communist Unification of Spain (UCE)	214	0.06	New	0	±0
Spanish Solidarity (SE)	211	0.06	New	0	±0
Communist League–Internationalist Socialist Workers' Coalition (LC (COSI))	0	0.00	New	0	±0
Communist Movement of Andalusia (MCA)	0	0.00	–0.16	0	±0
Spanish Phalanx of the CNSO (FE–JONS)	0	0.00	New	0	±0
Blank ballots	604	0.17	+0.06		
Total	363,721			7	±0
Valid votes	363,721	99.01	–0.01		
Invalid votes	3,651	0.99	+0.01		
Votes cast / turnout	367,372	81.90	+10.43		
Abstentions	81,201	18.10	–10.43		
Registered voters	448,573				
Sources
Footnotes: ^{1} People's Alliance–People's Democratic Party results are compared to Democratic Coalition totals in the 1979 election.; ^{2} New Force results are compared to National Union totals in the 1979 election.; ^{3} Communist Unity Candidacy results are compared to Workers' Communist Party totals in the 1979 election.

=== 1979 ===
Summary of the 1 March 1979 Congress of Deputies election results in Jaén
Parties and alliances	Popular vote			Seats	
Parties and alliances	Votes	%	±pp	Total	+/−
Spanish Socialist Workers' Party (PSOE)^{1}	137,861	41.89	+0.45	3	–1
Union of the Democratic Centre (UCD)	111,209	33.79	+0.78	3	±0
Communist Party of Spain (PCE)	42,466	12.90	+3.40	1	+1
Democratic Coalition (CD)^{2}	11,752	3.57	–4.84	0	±0
Socialist Party of Andalusia–Andalusian Party (PSA–PA)	11,335	3.44	New	0	±0
National Union (UN)^{3}	9,294	2.82	+2.40	0	±0
Party of Labour of Spain (PTE)^{4}	1,388	0.42	+0.01	0	±0
Spanish Socialist Workers' Party (historical) (PSOEh)^{5}	1,088	0.33	–0.35	0	±0
Workers' Communist Party (PCT)	579	0.18	New	0	±0
Communist Movement–Organization of Communist Left (MC–OIC)	528	0.16	New	0	±0
Republican Left (IR)	422	0.13	New	0	±0
Communist Organization of Spain (Red Flag) (OCE–BR)	398	0.12	New	0	±0
Workers' Revolutionary Organization (ORT)	398	0.12	New	0	±0
Blank ballots	357	0.11	+0.02		
Total	329,075			7	±0
Valid votes	329,075	99.02	–0.21		
Invalid votes	3,251	0.98	+0.21		
Votes cast / turnout	332,326	71.47	–7.07		
Abstentions	132,667	28.53	+7.07		
Registered voters	464,993				
Sources
Footnotes: ^{1} Spanish Socialist Workers' Party results are compared to the combined totals of Spanish Socialist Workers' Party and People's Socialist Party–Socialist Unity in the 1977 election.; ^{2} Democratic Coalition results are compared to People's Alliance totals in the 1977 election.; ^{3} National Union results are compared to José Antonio Circles totals in the 1977 election.; ^{4} Party of Labour of Spain results are compared to Democratic Left Front totals in the 1977 election.; ^{5} Spanish Socialist Workers' Party (historical) results are compared to Democratic Socialist Alliance totals in the 1977 election.

=== 1977 ===
Summary of the 15 June 1977 Congress of Deputies election results in Jaén
Parties and alliances	Popular vote			Seats	
Parties and alliances	Votes	%	±pp	Total	+/−
Spanish Socialist Workers' Party (PSOE)	123,708	39.38	n/a	4	n/a
Union of the Democratic Centre (UCD)	103,697	33.01	n/a	3	n/a
Communist Party of Spain (PCE)	29,847	9.50	n/a	0	n/a
People's Alliance (AP)	26,422	8.41	n/a	0	n/a
Agrarian Social Action (ASA)	8,439	2.69	n/a	0	n/a
People's Socialist Party–Socialist Unity (PSP–US)	6,476	2.06	n/a	0	n/a
Andalusian Regional Unity (URA)	5,291	1.68	n/a	0	n/a
Federation of Christian Democracy (FPD–ID)	3,071	0.98	n/a	0	n/a
Democratic Socialist Alliance (ASDCI)	2,135	0.68	n/a	0	n/a
José Antonio Circles (CJA)	1,308	0.42	n/a	0	n/a
Democratic Left Front (FDI)	1,278	0.41	n/a	0	n/a
Spanish Agrarian Party (PAE)	833	0.27	n/a	0	n/a
Spanish Phalanx of the CNSO (Authentic) (FE–JONS(A))	807	0.26	n/a	0	n/a
Independent Liberal Party (PLI)	596	0.19	n/a	0	n/a
Blank ballots	269	0.09	n/a		
Total	314,177			7	n/a
Valid votes	314,177	99.23	n/a		
Invalid votes	2,436	0.77	n/a		
Votes cast / turnout	316,613	78.54	n/a		
Abstentions	86,529	21.46	n/a		
Registered voters	403,142				

== Bibliography ==
- Ley 1/1977, de 4 de enero, para la Reforma Política (Fundamental Law 1/1977). Official State Gazette (in Spanish). 4 January 1977. BOE-A-1977-165.
- Real Decreto-ley 20/1977, de 18 de marzo, sobre Normas Electorales (Royal Decree-Law 20/1977). Official State Gazette (in Spanish). 18 March 1977. BOE-A-1977-7445.
- Constitución Española (Constitution). Official State Gazette (in Spanish). 27 December 1978. BOE-A-1978-31229.
- Ley Orgánica 5/1985, de 19 de junio, del Régimen Electoral General (Organic Law 5/1985). Official State Gazette (in Spanish). 19 June 1985. BOE-A-1985-11672.
- Carreras de Odriozola, Albert; Tafunell Sambola, Xavier (2005) [1989]. Estadísticas históricas de España, siglos XIX-XX (PDF) (in Spanish). Vol. 1 (II ed.). Bilbao: Fundación BBVA. pp. 1072–1097. ISBN 84-96515-00-1. Archived from the original (PDF) on 24 September 2015.
