= Opinion polling for the 1993 Spanish general election =

In the run up to the 1993 Spanish general election, various organisations carried out opinion polling to gauge voting intention in Spain during the term of the 4th Cortes Generales. Results of such polls are displayed in this article. The date range for these opinion polls is from the previous general election, held on 29 October 1989, to the day the next election was held, on 6 June 1993.

Voting intention estimates refer mainly to a hypothetical Congress of Deputies election. Polls are listed in reverse chronological order, showing the most recent first and using the dates when the survey fieldwork was done, as opposed to the date of publication. Where the fieldwork dates are unknown, the date of publication is given instead. The highest percentage figure in each polling survey is displayed with its background shaded in the leading party's colour. If a tie ensues, this is applied to the figures with the highest percentages. The "Lead" columns on the right shows the percentage-point difference between the parties with the highest percentages in a poll.

== Electoral polling ==
=== Nationwide polling ===
==== Graphical summary ====
Local regression trend line of poll results from 29 October 1989 to 6 June 1993, with each line corresponding to a political party.

==== Voting intention estimates ====
The table below lists nationwide voting intention estimates. Refusals are generally excluded from the party vote percentages, while question wording and the treatment of "don't know" responses and those not intending to vote may vary between polling organisations. When available, seat projections determined by the polling organisations are displayed below (or in place of) the percentages in a smaller font; 176 seats were required for an absolute majority in the Congress of Deputies.

Color key:

Exit poll

Polling firm/Commissioner	Fieldwork date	Sample size	Turnout	PSOE	PP	IU	CDS	CiU	PNV	HB	PA	UV	EA	EE	ERC	PAR	CC	BNG	PAP	Lead
1993 general election	6 Jun 1993	—N/a	76.4	38.8; 159	34.8; 141	9.6; 18	1.8; 0	4.9; 17	1.2; 5	0.9; 2	0.4; 0	0.5; 1	0.5; 1	(Note: Within PSOE.)	0.8; 1	0.6; 1	0.9; 4	0.5; 0	0.2; 0	4.0
Interior Ministry	6 Jun 1993	?	?	? 158/162	? 136/141	–	–	–	–	–	–	–	–		–	–	–	–	–	?
PSOE	6 Jun 1993	?	75	37.5; 150	34.1; 142	–	–	–	–	–	–	–	–		–	–	–	–	–	3.4
Demoscopia/Cadena SER	6 Jun 1993	?	?	37.1; 140/154	34.4; 139/154	10.2; 18/23	? 0	5.0; 17/18	? 6	0.6; 3	–	–	–		1.1; 1/3	–	–	–	–	2.7
Eco Consulting/RTVE	6 Jun 1993	250,000	?	? 139/155	? 134/148	? 20/23	? 0	? 18/20	? 6/7	? 3/5	–	–	–		? 1/3	–	–	–	–	?
Sigma Dos/Tele 5	6 Jun 1993	30,000	?	? 143	? 146	? 22	? 0	? 19	? 6	? 4	–	–	–		? 1	–	–	–	–	?
Motivación/COPE	6 Jun 1993	31,000	?	? 145	? 146	–	–	–	–	–	–	–	–		–	–	–	–	–	?
Gallup/Ya	30 May 1993	6,050	70.2	32.1; 134/139	33.0; 140/147	10.6; 23	2.6; 0	5.6; 21	1.4; 8	1.0; 4/5	–	0.9; 2	0.5; 1		0.7; 1	–	0.8; 4	–	0.5; 2	0.9
Opina/La Vanguardia	26–27 May 1993	2,000	?	35.0; 142/146	35.6; 144/148	11.4; 24/25	2.1; 0/1	5.0; 18/19	1.3; 6/7	–	–	–	–		0.9; 0/1	–	–	–	–	0.6
Vox Pública–Iope/El Periódico	25–27 May 1993	8,148	74.8	34.5; 133/152	32.5; 134/151	10.1; 19/24	2.3; 0/1	5.5; 19/21	1.5; 6/7	1.1; 3/4	0.7; 0	0.9; 2/3	0.7; 1/3		0.7; 1	–	1.0; 4/6	0.5; 1/2	0.5; 1	2.0
Sigma Dos/El Mundo	24–27 May 1993	13,200	?	34.6; 132/141	35.9; 147/155	11.4; 25/28	1.4; 0	4.9; 17/19	1.3; 5/6	1.0; 3/4	0.5; 0	0.5; 1	0.8; 2/3		0.7; 1	? 1	0.6; 3	0.3; 0	0.3; 1	1.3
Diario 16	26 May 1993	?	?	33.9	35.5	–	–	–	–	–	–	–	–		–	–	–	–	–	1.6
Demoscopia/El País	20–26 May 1993	11,000	73	34.5; 135/151	34.8; 141/155	10.7; 20/22	2.4; 0/1	5.0; 18/20	1.4; 6	0.8; 2/3	–	0.6; 2	0.5; 2		0.7; 1	? 1	0.7; 3	0.5; 0/1	–	0.3
Gruppo/ABC	23–25 May 1993	5,000	?	35.0; 134/144	35.8; 144/153	12.1; 26/28	–	4.9; 16/17	1.6; 6/7	1.0; 3	–	0.5; 1	0.8; 2/3		0.6; 1	0.3; 0/1	0.6; 3/4	–	0.3; 1	0.8
ICP–Research/Diario 16	21–24 May 1993	10,000	76.5	33.5; 137/145	32.8; 141/149	10.6; 19/24	3.0; 1/2	5.1; 17/19	1.3; 7/8	? 3/4	–	? 1	? 0/1		? 1/2	–	? 3/4	? 0/1	–	0.7
Sigma Dos/El Mundo	23 May 1993	3,000	?	34.0; 134/143	35.2; 144/153	12.6; 26/29	1.5; 0	5.0; 18/19	1.5; 6/7	1.0; 3/4	0.6; 0	0.5; 1	0.7; 1/2		0.6; 1/2	–	0.5; 2/3	0.3; 0	0.4; 1	1.2
CIS	14–19 May 1993	2,496	71.3	33.8	33.8	12.2	1.5	5.9	1.6	–	–	–	–		–	–	–	–	–	Tie
Vox Pública–Iope/El Periódico	14–18 May 1993	6,415	78.5	35.0; 139/150	30.7; 130/143	10.1; 19/27	2.4; 0/2	5.6; 18/20	1.5; 6/8	0.9; 2/4	–	0.7; 2	0.6; 1/2		0.6; 1	–	0.9; 3/5	0.9; 0/1	0.5; 1	4.3
ICP–Research/Diario 16	14–17 May 1993	1,000	75.7	35.0	33.0	10.7	3.1	5.1	1.3	–	–	–	–		–	–	–	–	–	2.0
Ábaco/El Correo (Note: Undecided and/or abstentionists excluded.)	14–16 May 1993	14,900	?	31.0; 119/132	33.5; 149/172	11.2; 23/28	2.5; 1	4.7; 19	1.6; 5	? 4	? 1	? 1	? 2/3		? 1	? 1	? 1	–	–	2.5
Sigma Dos/El Mundo	11–13 May 1993	10,200	?	34.8; 134/142	35.3; 147/155	12.4; 25/28	1.4; 0	5.0; 17/20	1.5; 6/7	1.0; 2/4	0.4; 0	0.5; 0	0.7; 1/2		0.7; 1	–	0.5; 1/3	0.3; 0	0.3; 1	0.5
Opina/La Vanguardia	10–12 May 1993	2,000	?	36.6; 147/152	35.7; 143/147	10.1; 21/22	2.0; 0/1	5.1; 18/19	1.4; 5/6	–	–	–	–		–	–	–	–	–	0.9
Gruppo/ABC	8–11 May 1993	5,000	?	34.1; 134/147	35.1; 140/150	12.9; 27/29	2.0; 0	4.9; 17/18	1.5; 6/7	1.1; 4	0.3; 0	0.5; 1	0.8; 3		0.6; 1	0.3; 1	0.5; 2/3	0.2; 0	0.3; 1	1.0
PSOE	27 Apr–11 May 1993	27,469	?	? 152	? 137	? 21	? 1	? 18	? 5	? 4	? 1	? 1	? 3		? 1	? 1	? 2	? 2	–	?
ICP–Research/Diario 16	10 May 1993	1,000	?	33.5	33.0	10.6	2.9	4.2	1.0	–	–	–	–		–	–	–	–	–	0.5
Demoscopia/El País	8–10 May 1993	2,500	78	36.6	35.5	11.2	1.4	4.9	1.1	0.8	–	0.6	0.4		0.7	–	0.4	–	–	1.1
Sigma Dos/Tele 5	2–4 May 1993	2,200	?	35.8; 142/152	34.5; 139/148	11.7; 26/27	1.2; 0	4.8; 16/17	1.6; 6/7	? 3/4	–	? 0/1	? 1		? 1/2	–	–	–	? 1	1.3
Sigma Dos/Tele 5	25–28 Apr 1993	?	?	34.9	34.6	12.2	–	5.0	1.6	–	–	–	–		–	–	–	–	–	0.3
CIS	24–28 Apr 1993	2,500	?	33.5; 135/145	34.5; 143/153	? 28/30	–	? 19	? 6/7	? 3/4	–	? 1	? 1		? 1/2	? 0/1	? 1	–	–	?
ICP–Research/Diario 16	26 Apr 1993	1,000	?	34.2	33.4	13.4	2.8	5.2	1.1	–	–	–	–		–	–	–	–	–	0.8
Opina/La Vanguardia	19–21 Apr 1993	2,006	?	35.5; 138/142	36.0; 138/146	11.0; 27/30	1.0; 0	5.5; 17/19	1.2; 4/6	–	–	–	–		–	–	–	–	–	0.5
Sigma Dos/Tele 5	20 Apr 1993	?	?	34.8; 139/147	35.0; 143/151	12.5; 27	–	4.9 ?	1.5 ?	–	–	–	–		–	–	–	–	–	0.2
Gallup/Ya	18 Apr 1993	1,003	?	35.3	35.3	11.9	2.5	4.3	–	–	–	–	–		–	–	–	–	–	Tie
Eco Consulting/CIS	15–16 Apr 1993	1,208	?	33.3	34.2	12.1	1.8	5.4	–	–	–	–	–		–	–	–	–	–	0.9
Vox Pública–Iope/El Periódico	13–16 Apr 1993	6,200	?	36.0; 145/160	32.6; 138/149	10.7; 24/26	1.7; 0	3.5; 17/18	1.0; 5/6	–	–	–	–		–	–	–	–	–	3.4
Sigma Dos/El Mundo	13–15 Apr 1993	8,200	?	34.4; 131/143	35.8; 145/158	12.1; 24/30	1.1; 0	5.0; 18/19	1.6; 6/7	1.1; 3/4	0.6; 0	0.5; 1	0.7; 1		0.7; 1	–	–	0.3; 0	0.4; 1	1.4
Intercampo/CIS	15–26 Mar 1993	2,500	70.2	34.6	33.6	11.6	1.5	4.7	1.4	–	–	–	–		–	–	–	–	–	1.0
Opina/La Vanguardia	22–24 Mar 1993	2,016	?	36.5; 137/150	35.4; 133/141	11.7; 27/30	1.7; 0/1	5.6; 16/19	1.5; 4/6	0.6; 3/4	–	–	–		0.9; 0/1	–	–	–	–	1.1
Demoscopia/El País	7–14 Mar 1993	10,000	65	33.9; 140/152	33.3; 137/149	11.5; 26/29	2.0; 0/1	5.0; 16/20	1.2; 5/6	0.9; 4	–	0.5; 2	0.5; 1/2		0.8; 1	0.5; 0/1	0.5; 1	–	–	0.6
Gallup/Ya	8–26 Feb 1993	1,003	?	32.2	34.5	12.9	–	–	–	–	–	–	–	–	–	–	–	–	–	2.3
PP	20 Feb 1993	?	?	32.2	35.0	13.0	2.0	–	–	–	–	–	–	–	–	–	–	–	–	2.8
Sigma Dos/El Mundo	1 Feb 1993	?	?	36.5; 147/157	33.0; 133/138	–	–	–	–	–	–	–	–	–	–	–	–	–	–	3.5
COPE	23 Dec 1992	?	?	? 149/153	? 138/140	? 18/19	? 0	? 18/19	? 7/8	? 5/6	? 7/8	–	–	? 1/2	–	–	–	–	–	?
Europa Press	23 Dec 1992	23,000	?	? 157/162	? 119/123	? 27/28	? 2/3	? 19/20	? 6/8	–	–	–	–	–	–	–	–	–	–	?
Sigma Dos/El Mundo	14 Dec 1992	?	?	36.9	31.5	10.9	2.3	5.1	1.3	–	–	–	–	–	–	–	–	–	–	5.4
CIS	4–28 Nov 1992	27,357	68.8	36.3; 155	31.0; 127	12.8; 28	2.1; 1	5.2; 18	1.4; 6	1.1; 4	1.4; 3	0.9; 2	0.7; 2	0.2; 0	0.7; 1	0.5; 1	0.5; 2	0.4; 0	–	5.3
CIS	28 Oct–2 Nov 1992	2,499	?	35.9	30.9	11.7	1.2	6.8	1.4	–	–	–	–	–	–	–	–	–	–	5.0
Sigma Dos/El Mundo	20–22 Oct 1992	3,000	?	36.8	31.7	12.0	1.5	–	–	–	–	–	–	–	–	–	–	–	–	5.1
OTR–IS/El Periódico	17–19 Oct 1992	?	?	37.4	31.1	11.5	2.2	5.2	–	–	–	–	–	–	–	–	–	–	–	6.3
Sigma Dos/El Mundo	20 Sep 1992	?	?	38.4	31.0	10.4	2.0	–	–	–	–	–	–	–	–	–	–	–	–	7.4
PSOE	13 Sep 1992	20,000	?	35.0– 37.0; 150/155	30.0– 31.0; 120/130	10.0– 12.0; 30	–	–	–	–	–	–	–	–	–	–	–	–	–	5.0– 6.0
OTR–IS	16 Aug 1992	?	?	37.8	31.2	11.5	–	–	–	–	–	–	–	–	–	–	–	–	–	6.6
Sigma Dos/El Mundo	19 Jul 1992	?	?	37.1	31.6	12.4	–	–	–	–	–	–	–	–	–	–	–	–	–	5.5
PSOE	1–10 Jul 1992	23,000	?	35.2; 155/160	28.2; 121/128	12.2; 28/30	5.3; 3	? 17	? 7	? 3	? 3	? 2	? 2	? 1	? 2	? 1	? 1	? 1	–	7.0
PP	7 Jul 1992	2,500	65	35.0	31.0	11.0	2.5	–	–	–	–	–	–	–	–	–	–	–	–	4.0
Opina/La Vanguardia	19–20 May 1992	1,000	?	37.5	27.8	10.0	2.9	5.5	–	–	–	–	–	–	–	–	–	–	–	9.7
Sigma Dos/El Mundo	26 Apr 1992	?	?	37.6; 159/166	30.8; 118/125	10.6; 23/25	1.4; 1	? 18/20	? 5/6	–	–	–	–	–	–	–	–	–	–	6.8
PP	5 Apr 1992	?	?	38.0	31.0	–	–	–	–	–	–	–	–	–	–	–	–	–	–	7.0
PP	3 Mar 1992	?	?	37.0	30.0	–	–	–	–	–	–	–	–	–	–	–	–	–	–	7.0
Sigma Dos/El Mundo	29 Dec 1991	?	?	38.5	29.3	10.4	–	–	–	–	–	–	–	–	–	–	–	–	–	9.2
Sigma Dos/El Mundo	22 Sep 1991	?	?	39.2	29.5	10.3	2.7	4.8	1.4	1.1	–	–	0.6	0.4	–	–	–	–	–	9.7
1991 local elections	26 May 1991	—N/a	62.8	38.3	25.7	8.4	3.9	4.9	1.6	1.1	1.8	1.0	0.7	0.4	0.5	0.7	0.8	0.6	–	12.6
PSOE	9 Apr 1991	?	?	41.5; 177	26.0; 108	10.7 ?	6.0 ?	5.0 ?	1.2 ?	–	–	–	–	–	–	–	–	–	–	15.5
Sigma Dos/El Mundo	26–28 Oct 1990	1,000	?	39.1	28.2	10.8	4.6	5.0	1.2	1.1	1.3	–	0.6	0.5	–	–	–	–	–	10.9
OTR–IS/El Periódico	20 Sep–1 Oct 1990	?	?	38.3	27.2	10.2	3.9	5.3	–	–	–	–	–	–	–	–	–	–	–	11.1
Sigma Dos/El Mundo	23 Sep 1990	?	?	39.5	28.1	10.4	4.7	5.0	1.2	1.1	1.2	–	0.6	0.5	–	–	–	–	–	11.4
Sigma Dos/El Mundo	25 Jul 1990	1,000	?	39.8	27.4	10.2	5.2	4.8	1.2	1.1	1.3	–	0.1	0.5	–	–	–	–	–	12.4
Sigma Dos/El Mundo	24 Jun 1990	?	?	38.4	28.7	10.9	3.5	4.9	1.2	1.1	1.4	–	0.6	0.5	–	–	–	–	–	9.7
Sigma Dos/El Mundo	27 May 1990	?	?	36.5	29.2	12.1	4.4	5.0	1.1	1.1	1.3	–	0.7	0.5	–	–	–	–	–	7.3
ICP–Research/Diario 16	13 May 1990	?	?	39.5	22.1	–	–	–	–	–	–	–	–	–	–	–	–	–	–	17.4
Sigma Dos/El Mundo	22 Apr 1990	?	?	36.8	28.3	11.8	5.4	4.8	1.3	1.1	1.2	–	0.6	0.5	–	–	–	–	–	8.5
Sigma Dos/El Mundo	25 Mar 1990	?	?	37.6	28.4	11.7	4.2	4.9	1.2	1.1	1.3	–	0.6	0.5	–	–	–	–	–	9.2
Sigma Dos/El Mundo	25 Feb 1990	?	?	36.3	29.0	12.4	4.7	4.5	1.1	1.0	1.2	–	0.6	0.5	–	–	–	–	–	7.3
Sigma Dos/El Mundo	21 Jan 1990	?	?	37.0	29.1	10.4	5.9	4.9	1.2	1.0	1.1	–	0.6	0.5	–	–	–	–	–	7.9
Sigma Dos/El Mundo	31 Dec 1989	?	?	39.8	26.2	9.5	6.9	4.9	1.2	1.1	1.0	–	0.7	0.6	–	–	–	–	–	13.6
1989 general election	29 Oct 1989	—N/a	69.7	39.6; 175	25.8; 107	9.1; 17	7.9; 14	5.0; 18	1.2; 5	1.1; 4	1.0; 2	0.7; 2	0.7; 2	0.5; 2	0.4; 0	0.4; 1	0.3; 1	0.2; 0	–	13.8

==== Voting preferences ====
The table below lists raw, unweighted voting preferences.

Polling firm/Commissioner	Fieldwork date	Sample size	PSOE	PP	IU	CDS	CiU	PNV	HB	LV	Question	X mark	Lead
1993 general election (Note: Does not include non-resident citizens.)	6 Jun 1993	—N/a	29.6	26.7	7.3	1.3	3.8	0.9	0.7	0.6	—N/a	23.1	2.9
CIS	25–29 May 1993	2,503	26.5	17.9	7.1	1.4	2.6	1.0	0.7	1.2	30.3	6.1	8.6
Opina/La Vanguardia	26–27 May 1993	2,000	22.9	22.8	–	–	–	–	–	–	–	–	0.1
ASEP	17–22 May 1993	1,222	32.1	17.7	8.4	1.0	4.7*	*	1.1**	2.8	21.7	7.2	14.4
CIS	14–19 May 1993	2,496	24.3	16.9	6.8	1.1	3.4	0.7	0.5	1.8	32.3	7.6	7.4
Ábaco/El Correo	14–16 May 1993	14,900	19.9	21.5	7.2	1.6	3.0	1.0	–	–	–	–	1.6
Opina/La Vanguardia	10–12 May 1993	2,000	22.6	18.8	5.2	–	–	–	–	–	36.0	–	3.8
CIS	23–29 Apr 1993	2,500	21.9	16.2	6.5	1.0	3.6	0.6	0.7	1.8	35.6	7.3	5.7
ASEP	19–24 Apr 1993	1,218	28.3	18.9	6.5	1.5	4.0*	*	1.3**	3.0	24.2	9.1	9.4
Opina/La Vanguardia	19–21 Apr 1993	2,006	16.3	23.4	6.0	–	–	–	–	–	–	–	7.1
Eco Consulting/CIS	15–16 Apr 1993	1,208	22.8	20.5	4.9	0.1	2.0	0.6	0.0	–	41.2	3.8	2.3
CIS	23–30 Mar 1993	2,499	17.7	15.0	5.1	0.9	2.4	0.5	0.4	–	42.6	11.7	2.7
CIS	15–26 Mar 1993	2,500	27.2	19.0	7.2	1.1	3.5	1.1	0.7	3.2	23.5	10.6	8.2
Opina/La Vanguardia	22–24 Mar 1993	2,016	17.0	19.1	6.0	–	–	–	–	–	–	–	2.1
ASEP	15–20 Mar 1993	1,212	24.6	20.2	7.1	1.4	6.2*	*	1.4**	2.1	21.3	11.9	4.4
CIS	1 Mar 1993	1,000	22.6	19.4	8.7	0.3	2.8	0.3	0.7	3.8	33.4	2.4	3.2
ASEP	15–20 Feb 1993	1,209	26.1	21.8	5.7	1.4	4.7*	*	1.1**	2.9	23.3	10.0	4.3
CIS	8–13 Feb 1993	2,502	22.8	20.3	6.5	1.1	3.1	0.9	0.6	–	29.1	11.5	2.5
CIS	27 Jan–4 Feb 1993	2,502	19.5	12.0	6.3	0.7	2.4	0.6	0.6	–	40.8	13.0	7.5
ASEP	18–23 Jan 1993	1,204	21.6	15.7	7.4	1.3	5.0*	*	1.4**	2.7	31.3	11.0	5.9
CIS	14–23 Jan 1993	2,492	20.7	12.4	5.6	0.9	1.8	0.6	0.7	–	38.6	15.1	8.3
CIS	15–21 Dec 1992	2,499	22.9	13.6	6.5	1.3	2.4	0.8	0.6	–	38.0	10.7	9.3
CIS	9–19 Dec 1992	4,277	18.3	10.3	6.9	1.1	2.7	0.3	0.7	–	43.0	12.2	8.0
ASEP	9–14 Dec 1992	1,212	21.3	17.6	6.7	2.1	4.3*	*	1.6**	2.8	28.4	12.9	3.7
CIS	1–9 Dec 1992	2,497	20.5	11.9	5.0	1.2	2.3	0.5	0.4	–	42.5	12.3	8.6
ASEP	9–14 Nov 1992	1,220	22.1	15.6	6.8	1.6	6.8*	*	1.2**	2.2	27.1	14.6	6.5
CIS	28 Oct–2 Nov 1992	2,499	24.3	12.3	5.6	0.9	2.8	0.8	0.6	–	35.2	14.0	12.0
ASEP	13–17 Oct 1992	1,222	24.1	13.8	6.9	1.6	6.1*	*	1.7**	2.5	26.3	14.0	10.3
CIS	9–17 Oct 1992	2,498	24.4	10.7	4.4	0.8	2.9	0.5	0.2	–	36.9	15.4	13.7
CIS	24–30 Sep 1992	2,497	19.9	9.9	6.3	1.4	2.9	0.8	0.6	–	40.7	14.1	10.0
ASEP	14–19 Sep 1992	1,220	25.5	15.4	6.8	1.6	4.7*	*	2.0**	2.9	24.8	14.2	10.1
CIS	8–14 Sep 1992	2,498	22.4	11.4	6.3	0.7	3.3	0.7	0.4	–	37.8	13.2	11.0
CIS	15–20 Jul 1992	2,488	20.8	11.2	4.9	1.0	3.0	0.8	0.3	–	39.3	14.8	9.6
CIS	9–16 Jul 1992	2,498	26.5	10.6	6.6	1.0	1.9	1.6	0.5	–	34.7	13.1	15.9
ASEP	1–8 Jul 1992	1,216	26.0	16.4	6.2	1.5	5.4*	*	0.6**	3.9	24.3	13.1	9.6
CIS	27 Jun–5 Jul 1992	2,495	23.2	11.7	5.6	1.3	2.5	0.6	0.3	–	38.7	12.2	11.5
CIS	16–22 Jun 1992	2,495	27.0	13.4	6.5	1.2	2.3	0.9	0.4	–	32.4	11.9	13.6
ASEP	8–13 Jun 1992	1,216	27.8	17.7	8.4	1.8	6.4*	*	0.7**	2.8	20.2	12.4	10.1
CIS	23 May–2 Jun 1992	3,412	23.5	11.4	4.8	0.8	2.9	0.7	0.5	–	37.5	14.0	12.1
CIS	5–21 May 1992	2,500	24.3	10.3	6.3	1.2	2.8	0.7	0.4	–	35.2	14.2	14.0
ASEP	11–16 May 1992	1,211	25.1	15.9	8.2	1.8	8.2*	*	0.4**	2.8	22.4	13.2	9.2
CIS	1–10 May 1992	2,494	22.5	8.5	5.0	1.1	3.3	0.5	0.2	–	42.5	12.6	14.0
CIS	24–29 Apr 1992	2,486	21.7	9.3	4.6	1.0	3.3	0.8	0.7	–	38.5	16.8	12.4
CIS	4–22 Apr 1992	2,486	23.2	12.3	5.5	1.3	2.3	0.6	0.4	–	35.3	14.6	10.9
ASEP	6–11 Apr 1992	1,208	29.1	15.7	7.3	1.9	5.9*	*	0.6**	3.1	21.8	12.9	13.4
CIS	26–29 Mar 1992	1,280	27.7	14.2	4.3	0.8	2.2	–	–	–	28.2	14.7	13.5
ASEP	9–14 Mar 1992	1,211	29.0	15.5	6.8	2.6	6.3*	*	0.6**	3.1	20.4	12.8	13.5
CIS	25 Feb–3 Mar 1992	2,490	28.9	11.4	5.2	0.8	2.7	0.6	0.2	–	35.6	11.6	17.5
CIS	18–27 Feb 1992	2,484	28.4	11.7	5.4	1.3	2.1	0.8	0.2	–	33.5	13.7	16.7
ASEP	10–15 Feb 1992	1,213	28.9	16.8	6.7	1.9	5.5*	*	0.5**	2.7	23.6	11.7	12.1
CIS	28 Jan–5 Feb 1992	2,498	26.6	10.4	4.9	1.5	2.6	1.0	0.5	–	36.6	13.1	16.2
ASEP	13–18 Jan 1992	1,206	30.2	15.8	6.6	2.0	6.3*	*	0.8**	3.5	19.6	12.9	14.4
CIS	17–30 Dec 1991	2,494	29.6	11.8	4.7	1.7	2.5	0.6	0.6	–	32.6	11.6	17.8
ASEP	9–14 Dec 1991	1,207	31.1	14.8	6.7	2.1	5.3*	*	0.6**	3.3	18.7	15.7	16.3
CIS	22–27 Nov 1991	2,498	32.7	11.0	6.3	1.5	2.5	1.3	0.6	–	29.7	11.4	22.7
ASEP	11–16 Nov 1991	1,219	31.3	15.0	6.5	3.0	5.7*	*	0.7**	2.9	19.5	13.0	16.3
CIS	19–24 Oct 1991	2,491	28.9	13.4	6.0	1.8	3.1	0.8	0.4	–	29.9	12.2	15.5
ASEP	14–19 Oct 1991	1,215	28.7	12.7	7.1	2.1	6.1*	*	0.4**	3.0	24.3	14.6	16.0
CIS	17–23 Sep 1991	3,350	32.3	11.7	5.4	1.1	2.9	0.8	0.6	–	31.5	10.4	20.6
ASEP	16–20 Sep 1991	1,200	29.7	13.2	5.6	1.7	7.1*	*	0.9**	2.4	23.5	13.9	16.5
CIS	7–15 Jul 1991	2,494	29.3	12.2	6.7	1.8	2.9	0.9	0.9	–	29.9	10.8	17.1
CIS	2–7 Jul 1991	2,462	28.2	10.7	5.3	1.9	2.8	1.1	0.4	–	34.3	11.8	17.5
CIS	27 Jun–3 Jul 1991	2,471	26.6	11.0	6.7	1.5	3.2	1.1	0.3	–	33.2	11.3	15.6
ASEP	10–15 Jun 1991	1,215	30.3	15.5	7.0	2.0	6.9*	*	0.9**	3.1	23.8	9.7	14.8
CIS	5–11 Jun 1991	2,448	27.8	12.0	5.7	1.1	2.9	0.7	0.5	–	34.1	11.6	15.8
CIS	2–6 Jun 1991	3,405	31.0	13.0	7.0	1.0	3.0	1.0	0.0	–	30.0	9.0	14.0
ASEP	13–18 May 1991	1,203	28.7	12.1	7.5	3.5	5.5*	*	0.5**	3.0	26.6	10.6	16.6
CIS	25 Apr–8 May 1991	17,687	26.1	9.0	4.8	1.6	2.7	0.9	0.5	–	39.7	10.8	17.1
CIS	17–20 Apr 1991	2,494	25.2	10.7	4.3	1.2	2.4	0.8	0.4	–	40.1	11.5	14.5
ASEP	15–20 Apr 1991	1,212	29.7	12.1	6.3	2.6	4.3*	*	0.7**	2.5	27.0	12.6	17.6
CIS	20–30 Mar 1991	2,482	31.1	10.8	5.3	1.6	2.8	0.8	0.6	–	34.0	9.2	20.3
ASEP	18–23 Mar 1991	1,218	33.9	12.5	6.6	3.6	6.7*	*	1.3**	2.2	22.0	9.6	21.4
CIS	8–12 Mar 1991	2,479	31.7	11.0	5.6	1.7	3.0	0.6	1.1	–	31.3	11.2	20.7
CIS	22–26 Feb 1991	2,483	28.8	11.3	5.2	1.2	2.8	1.0	1.0	–	34.3	11.3	17.5
CIS	15–19 Feb 1991	2,489	27.9	9.6	7.0	2.1	2.8	1.1	0.8	–	34.8	11.0	18.3
ASEP	11–16 Feb 1991	1,208	28.7	12.8	8.5	4.2	6.1*	*	2.0**	1.5	20.6	13.1	15.9
CIS	7–12 Feb 1991	2,479	27.5	10.3	5.7	1.8	3.1	0.6	0.5	–	34.8	12.3	17.2
CIS	3–5 Feb 1991	2,498	26.0	9.8	6.8	2.3	3.3	1.2	0.6	–	34.1	12.6	16.2
CIS	28–30 Jan 1991	2,434	26.4	10.2	5.9	1.6	2.7	0.7	0.8	–	36.6	12.5	16.2
CIS	21–23 Jan 1991	2,488	27.4	9.2	4.9	2.2	1.9	0.7	0.4	–	36.6	13.2	18.2
ASEP	14–18 Jan 1991	1,233	26.0	13.2	8.6	3.1	5.4*	*	0.9**	2.8	23.8	13.2	12.8
CIS	27 Dec–7 Jan 1991	2,490	32.0	9.0	5.0	2.0	3.0	1.0	0.0	–	34.0	10.0	23.0
CIS	18–26 Dec 1990	2,495	27.6	11.0	6.0	2.4	3.2	1.0	0.2	–	32.1	12.7	16.6
ASEP	10–15 Dec 1990	1,206	26.0	15.5	7.3	4.1	5.7*	*	1.4**	3.0	23.4	12.0	10.5
CIS	22–28 Nov 1990	2,492	33.7	10.6	6.2	1.9	2.9	0.9	0.9	–	29.1	10.5	23.1
ASEP	15–20 Nov 1990	1,238	27.5	13.1	5.5	2.0	5.3*	*	1.3**	2.9	27.3	13.0	14.4
CIS	17–24 Oct 1990	2,487	29.3	10.9	5.5	2.9	3.4	1.0	0.9	–	31.5	11.4	18.4
ASEP	15–20 Oct 1990	1,224	24.5	13.9	6.6	2.5	4.6*	*	1.9**	3.2	29.5	10.8	10.6
OTR–IS/El Periódico	20 Sep–1 Oct 1990	?	21.4	9.3	5.1	1.2	2.1	–	–	–	39.8	14.3	12.1
ASEP	17–21 Sep 1990	1,213	27.1	12.8	5.4	1.7	5.1*	*	1.0**	3.1	30.4	11.1	14.3
CIS	18–20 Sep 1990	2,500	26.9	12.1	6.1	2.6	2.5	0.6	0.7	–	34.2	10.9	14.8
CIS	12–19 Jul 1990	2,485	29.9	8.2	5.8	1.6	2.2	1.0	0.5	–	35.0	12.9	21.7
CIS	9–19 Jul 1990	2,500	32.9	10.8	5.9	2.0	3.0	0.4	0.7	–	29.4	11.0	22.1
ASEP	2–6 Jul 1990	1,208	28.6	13.1	6.4	3.2	4.1*	*	0.9**	2.4	30.7	9.2	15.5
CIS	20–27 Jun 1990	2,492	31.9	12.7	7.5	2.9	3.4	0.9	0.6	–	27.6	9.3	19.2
ASEP	11–16 Jun 1990	1,221	25.3	10.6	7.5	3.9	4.8*	*	1.6**	1.9	31.7	11.0	14.7
CIS	17–21 May 1990	2,492	30.5	11.9	7.9	2.2	2.9	0.9	0.6	–	30.5	8.4	18.6
ASEP	14–19 May 1990	1,219	27.3	11.8	6.7	1.9	5.4*	*	1.1**	2.5	29.9	11.6	15.5
CIS	28 Apr–7 May 1990	2,492	27.2	14.8	7.4	2.6	3.1	1.1	0.6	–	32.6	6.8	13.4
ASEP	16–20 Apr 1990	1,219	25.8	13.8	7.3	2.8	5.8*	*	1.6**	1.3	29.1	10.0	12.0
CIS	7–10 Apr 1990	2,497	31.0	15.0	8.0	2.0	3.0	1.0	0.0	–	29.0	8.0	16.0
CIS	1–5 Apr 1990	2,485	25.0	13.0	6.0	2.0	3.0	1.0	0.0	–	35.0	12.0	12.0
CIS	26–29 Mar 1990	2,484	26.6	13.0	7.7	2.0	3.1	0.5	0.6	–	33.9	9.1	13.6
ASEP	12–17 Mar 1990	1,203	29.5	15.0	7.2	2.9	6.0*	*	1.4**	2.8	23.9	9.7	14.5
CIS	17–26 Feb 1990	2,495	27.5	13.9	7.9	4.3	3.0	1.1	0.7	–	27.6	10.9	13.6
ASEP	12–17 Feb 1990	1,210	30.9	14.8	8.5	3.5	4.9*	*	0.7**	2.5	15.7	14.7	16.1
CIS	17–22 Jan 1990	2,923	34.0	13.3	7.5	3.4	3.0	0.9	0.8	–	25.0	8.0	20.7
CIS	17–22 Jan 1990	2,496	30.0	12.0	7.0	3.0	3.0	1.0	0.0	–	28.0	12.0	18.0
ASEP	15–20 Jan 1990	1,210	30.7	11.0	8.4	4.1	5.9*	*	1.8**	2.3	25.8	8.3	19.7
CIS	28 Dec–8 Jan 1990	2,492	26.0	10.0	6.0	4.0	3.0	1.0	0.0	–	35.0	10.0	16.0
CIS	15–28 Dec 1989	2,493	30.2	11.9	8.1	3.3	3.4	0.6	0.3	–	30.4	7.8	18.3
CIS	14–20 Dec 1989	3,195	32.9	10.7	8.0	2.4	3.0	0.7	0.6	–	30.0	7.7	22.2
ASEP	29 Nov–7 Dec 1989	1,215	29.9	11.5	11.0	3.9	5.5*	*	1.1**	2.1	25.6	8.1	18.4
CIS	23–28 Nov 1989	?	30.0	10.6	7.4	3.9	3.2	0.6	0.5	–	30.7	8.6	19.4
CIS	17–23 Nov 1989	2,463	31.3	11.6	8.8	3.5	3.6	1.3	0.7	–	25.8	9.0	19.7
ASEP	6–11 Nov 1989	1,203	32.1	12.9	10.9	3.0	6.0*	*	0.9**	1.8	23.2	7.1	19.2
1989 general election	29 Oct 1989	—N/a	27.5	17.9	6.3	5.5	3.5	0.9	0.7	0.5	—N/a	30.1	9.6
(*) Includes data for CiU, PNV, EA, CG, PRC, PAR, UPN, PA, UV, EU and AIC/CC. (**) Includes data for HB, ERC, EE and BNG.

==== Victory preference ====
The table below lists opinion polling on the victory preferences for each party in the event of a general election taking place.

Polling firm/Commissioner	Fieldwork date	Sample size	PSOE	PP	IU	CDS	CiU	PNV	Other/ None	Question	Lead
CIS	25–29 May 1993	2,503	39.5	23.3	–	–	–	–	9.2	27.9	16.2
Opina/La Vanguardia	26–27 May 1993	2,000	29.9	29.4	5.5	–	4.0	0.9	5.9	24.4	0.5
Demoscopia/El País	20–26 May 1993	11,000	42.0	23.0	–	–	–	–	35.0		19.0
CIS	14–19 May 1993	2,496	35.9	20.0	–	–	–	–	10.8	33.3	15.9
Opina/La Vanguardia	10–12 May 1993	2,000	30.1	23.9	6.8	–	2.7	0.4	8.4	27.8	6.2
CIS	23–29 Apr 1993	2,500	34.4	20.0	–	–	–	–	14.0	31.7	14.4
Opina/La Vanguardia	19–21 Apr 1993	2,006	24.0	26.3	7.6	–	3.3	0.6	6.5	31.6	2.3
Eco Consulting/CIS	15–16 Apr 1993	1,208	30.8	23.6	–	–	–	–	20.7	24.8	7.2
Opina/La Vanguardia	22–24 Mar 1993	2,016	22.2	21.4	5.7	–	1.5	0.4	7.6	41.1	0.8
CIS	1 Mar 1993	1,000	34.7	26.4	4.5	–	–	–	17.0	17.3	8.3
CIS	8–12 Mar 1991	2,479	36.3	13.2	6.4	1.9	3.1	0.7	4.0	34.3	23.1
CIS	22–26 Feb 1991	2,483	33.0	13.3	5.9	1.5	2.8	1.0	4.1	38.3	19.7
CIS	15–19 Feb 1991	2,489	32.9	11.8	8.3	2.2	3.0	1.1	3.8	36.8	21.1
CIS	7–12 Feb 1991	2,479	32.0	12.4	6.9	2.0	3.4	0.6	3.5	39.4	19.6
CIS	3–5 Feb 1991	2,498	30.5	12.3	7.6	3.0	3.8	1.1	3.7	38.0	18.2
CIS	18–26 Dec 1990	2,495	30.1	13.5	7.0	2.7	3.2	1.1	3.8	38.6	16.6
CIS	22–28 Nov 1990	2,492	39.8	12.9	7.1	2.6	3.1	0.9	5.2	28.3	26.9
CIS	17–24 Oct 1990	2,487	35.2	12.9	6.0	3.3	3.5	1.0	3.4	34.5	22.3
CIS	9–19 Jul 1990	2,500	35.3	12.9	6.2	2.7	3.1	0.5	5.0	34.2	22.4
CIS	20–27 Jun 1990	2,492	35.6	14.4	8.1	3.2	3.7	1.0	4.6	29.4	21.2
CIS	17–21 May 1990	2,492	36.1	14.6	8.7	3.0	3.3	0.7	5.2	28.4	21.5
CIS	28 Apr–7 May 1990	2,492	32.0	17.5	8.2	2.7	3.3	1.1	4.5	30.6	14.5
CIS	26–29 Mar 1990	2,484	29.5	15.6	8.1	2.8	3.1	0.7	3.4	36.8	13.9
CIS	17–26 Feb 1990	2,495	32.6	17.6	9.3	5.4	3.4	1.2	7.4	23.0	15.0
CIS	17–22 Jan 1990	2,923	39.9	16.2	8.8	4.4	3.5	0.9	6.5	20.0	23.7
CIS	17–23 Nov 1989	2,463	36.5	14.6	9.3	4.4	3.7	1.2	6.8	23.5	21.9

==== Victory likelihood ====
The table below lists opinion polling on the perceived likelihood of victory for each party in the event of a general election taking place.

Polling firm/Commissioner	Fieldwork date	Sample size	PSOE	PP	IU	CDS	CiU	PNV	Other/ None	Question	Lead
CIS	25–29 May 1993	2,503	38.7	14.0	–	–	–	–	25.1	22.2	24.7
Opina/La Vanguardia	26–27 May 1993	2,000	45.6	25.2	0.3	–	0.6	0.2	1.0	27.2	20.4
Demoscopia/El País	20–26 May 1993	11,000	59.0	13.0	–	–	–	–	28.0		46.0
ASEP	17–22 May 1993	1,222	61.6	16.8	0.7	0.5	0.2	0.1	4.7	15.4	44.8
CIS	14–19 May 1993	2,496	42.8	10.9	–	–	–	–	22.0	24.2	31.9
Opina/La Vanguardia	10–12 May 1993	2,000	56.9	15.3	0.2	–	0.1	0.0	2.3	25.1	41.6
CIS	23–29 Apr 1993	2,500	41.4	11.5	–	–	–	–	23.7	23.3	29.9
ASEP	19–24 Apr 1993	1,218	52.5	18.7	0.6	0.4	0.4	–	6.0	21.2	33.8
Opina/La Vanguardia	19–21 Apr 1993	2,006	50.5	23.7	0.5	–	0.1	0.0	1.8	23.5	26.8
Eco Consulting/CIS	15–16 Apr 1993	1,208	37.8	12.4	–	–	–	–	34.7	15.0	25.4
CIS	15–26 Mar 1993	2,500	69.9	20.2	–	–	–	–	–	9.9	49.7
Opina/La Vanguardia	22–24 Mar 1993	2,016	42.3	17.6	0.3	–	0.1	0.0	2.4	37.2	24.7
ASEP	15–20 Mar 1993	1,212	56.8	20.2	0.8	0.3	0.2	0.1	2.6	19.0	36.6
CIS	1 Mar 1993	1,000	63.8	16.3	–	–	–	–	4.2	15.6	47.5
ASEP	15–20 Feb 1993	1,209	48.4	23.2	0.8	0.2	0.2	–	2.9	24.3	25.2
CIS	8–13 Feb 1993	2,502	61.3	18.6	–	–	–	–	–	19.9	42.7
ASEP	18–23 Jan 1993	1,204	53.9	14.5	0.9	0.2	0.2	0.2	2.7	27.3	39.4
ASEP	9–14 Dec 1992	1,212	51.7	13.5	1.2	0.5	–	–	4.3	28.9	38.2

=== Sub-national polling ===
==== Catalonia ====
Polling firm/Commissioner	Fieldwork date	Sample size	Turnout	PSC	CiU	PP	IC	CDS	ERC	Lead
1993 general election	6 Jun 1993	—N/a	75.4	34.9; 18	31.8; 17	17.0; 8	7.5; 3	0.8; 0	5.1; 1	3.1
Opina/La Vanguardia	10–12 May 1993	?	?	? 16/17	? 18/19	? 7	? 4/5	? 0	? 1/2	?
Opina/La Vanguardia	19–21 Apr 1993	?	?	28.0; 15/16	32.0; 17/19	15.0; 6/7	12.0; 4/5	? 0	7.0; 1/2	4.0
Opina/La Vanguardia	22–24 Mar 1993	?	?	? 16/18	? 16/19	? 7/9	? 4/5	? 0	? 0/1	?
1989 general election	29 Oct 1989	—N/a	67.6	35.6; 20	32.7; 18	10.6; 4	7.3; 3	4.3; 1	2.7; 0	2.9
