= Common front =

Political alliance

In politics, a common front is an alliance between different groups, forces, or interests in pursuit of a common goal or in opposition to a common enemy. Other words that may be used are "alliance" or "coalition", though the term "common front" is often used when groups want to emphasize that their alliance is of a temporary nature and that individual groups within the front maintain their independence and do not consider themselves subservient to a collective partnership.

The practice of uniting with anyone against a common enemy is called frontism. Historically, it has been a practice of Marxist–Leninist parties to unite with non-communist forces in revolution. In left-wing politics, there are two main types of common fronts: the popular front and the united front.
