= Juan Guerra affair =

Corruption scandal in Spain

The Juan Guerra affair (Spanish: caso Juan Guerra) was a political scandal in Spain involving Juan Guerra, the brother of then deputy prime minister and deputy secretary-general of the Spanish Socialist Workers' Party (PSOE), Alfonso Guerra, during the premiership of Felipe González.

In January 1990, it was unveiled that Juan Guerra had been using an official office in the Government Delegation in Andalusia to conduct personal business, while invoking his brother's name to assert his authority and extract concessions. A judicial investigation was opened amid accusations of nepotism, influence peddling, fraud and tax evasion, ultimately leading to the resignation of Alfonso Guerra as deputy prime minister in January 1991.
