= Socialist October =

Socialist October Octubre Socialista
- Leader: Alfonso Fernández Malo
- Founded: 1986
- Ideology: Democratic socialism Marxism

Octubre Socialista (Spanish: Octubre Socialista) was a left-wing political party active in the province of Jaén, Spain.

== History ==
It was formed in 1986 by Alberto Fernández Malo, who broke away from the Spanish Socialist Workers' Party (PSOE). Fernández had previous been a member of the Socialist Left, a leftist tendency inside PSOE. The party took part in founding the United Left (IU) in 1986.

In the 1993 parliamentary election Octubre Socialista got 540 votes (0.14% of the votes in the province). In the municipality of Torreperogil it obtained 211 votes (4.07%). In the city of Jaén, it obtained 125 votes (0.2%).

== Elections ==
=== 1991 municipal election ===
| Municipality | Votes | % | Seats |
|---|---|---|---|
| Jaén | 237 | 0.5% | 0 |
| Torreperogil | 481 | 10.71% | 1 |

=== 1995 municipal election ===
| Municipality | Votes | % | Seats |
|---|---|---|---|
| Jaén | 216 | 0.37% | 0 |
| Torreperogil | 929 | 18.89% | 2 |
