= 1991 Spanish elections =

1991 Spanish elections may refer to one of two nationwide elections held in Spain on 26 May 1991:

- 1991 Spanish local elections, to elect local seats in Spanish municipalities, provinces and island councils.
- 1991 Spanish regional elections, to elect the regional parliaments of thirteen autonomous communities.
