= Ibercorp affair =

Corruption scandal in Spain

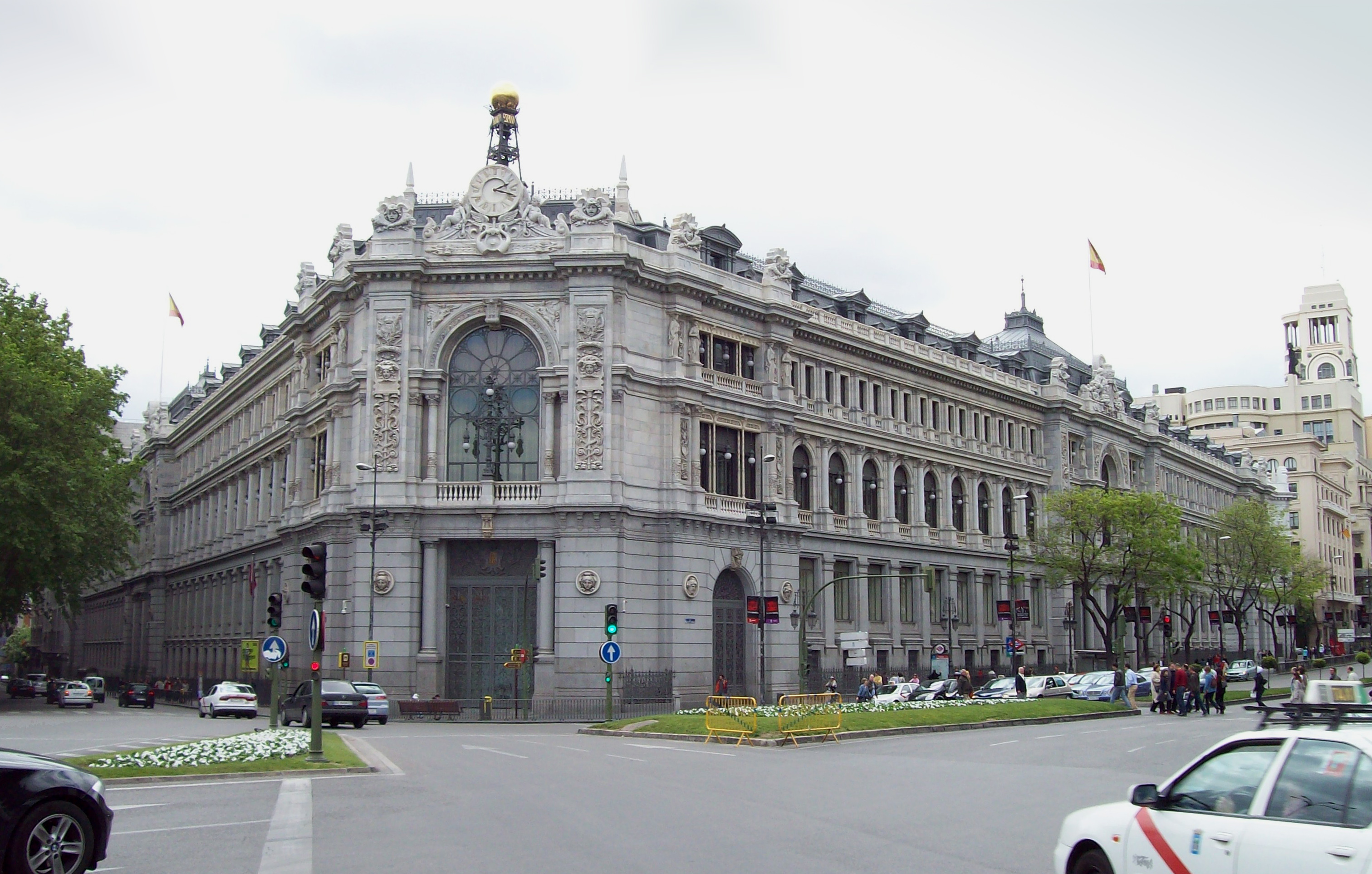
The Bank of Spain Building in 2009

The Ibercorp affair (Spanish: caso Ibercorp) was a political corruption case in Spain during the premiership of Felipe González, involving insider trading, forgery, secret bank accounts and institutional favoritism, related to the Ibercorp investment bank and affecting the then governor of the Bank of Spain, Mariano Rubio, and close allies (which included former Spanish economy minister between 1982 and 1985, Miguel Boyer, and socialite Isabel Preysler). The scandal would serve as a symbol of the connections between the PSOE government and the so-called "beautiful people": businessmen and nouveau riche who had emerged during the Socialist era.

The scandal broke out after the unveiling of financial irregularities in several companies in the Ibercorp Group throughout 1991, hinting at market manipulation through pump and dump and with the involvement of the Bank of Spain. In February 1992, El Mundo revealed that the Group's chairman, Manuel de la Concha, had lied to the National Securities Market Commission (CNMV) in a previous investigation into his operations, while Rubio himself was accused of owning stock shares in the Ibercorp bank, prompting the CNMV to re-open its inquiry. In March 1992, the CNMV initiated several sanctioning proceedings against Ibercorp for inflating the value of its shares. While Rubio denied all accusations of wrongdoing, he was replaced from his post in July that year.

In April 1994, it transpired that Rubio had 130 million Ptas of undeclared money in a secret bank account at Ibercorp, and that the Bank of Spain he presided had favored Ibercorp by granting loans with advantageous conditions despite knowing the entity's financial situation. These new revelations forced the resignations of Carlos Solchaga as PSOE's parliamentary spokesperson (who had backed Rubio while serving as economy minister in 1992) and Vicente Albero as agriculture minister (after he was discovered to own a secret account with undeclared money related to the scandal).

== Bibliography ==
- Argandoña, Antonio (1998). Ethics in Finance and Public Policy: The Ibercorp Affair (PDF). IESE Business School (Thesis). Barcelona: University of Navarre.
