= Filesa affair =

Corruption scandal in Spain

The Filesa affair (Spanish: caso Filesa) was a political corruption case in Spain involving the illegal financing of several election campaigns by the Spanish Socialist Workers' Party (PSOE) during the premiership of Felipe González. Under the scheme, the then-ruling PSOE collected large corporate donations for fictitious consultancy work that was never carried out. The scandal's name refers to Barcelona-based consultancy group that were used as shell corporations for collecting the kickbacks to be transferred to the PSOE.

In May 1991, it was revealed that a number of PSOE-linked companies (Filesa, Malesa and Time Export) had been paid hundreds of millions for consultancy works that were never carried out; these funds would later be used to illegally fund the party's campaigns in the late 1980s.

Judicial investigations lasted for several years, resulting in the conviction of several individuals by the Spanish Supreme Court in 1997, and its confirmation by the Constitutional Court of Spain in 2001. The Filesa scandal would draw comparisons to the later Gürtel affair, concerning the illegal financing of People's Party campaigns.
