= 1991 Mutxamel bombing =

Attempted car bombing by the Basque separatist organisation ETA in 1991

Mutxamel bombing
- Part of the Basque conflict
- Location: Mutxamel, Spain
- Date: 16 September 1991; 0930 (UTC+1)
- Target: Civil Guard barracks
- Attack type: Car bombing
- Deaths: 3
- Injuries: 30
- Perpetrator: ETA

A car bombing was carried out by the Basque separatist organisation ETA on 16 September 1991 in the town of Mutxamel (Spanish: Muchamiel) near Alicante. The target was the Civil Guard barracks in the town. However the bomb initially failed to explode near its target. The police treated the car as an abandoned vehicle, not realising that it contained a bomb and while being towed away, the car bomb exploded, killing two police officers and the civilian towing the car away. The bombing was the deadliest of the 40 attacks which ETA carried out in the Province of Alicante between 1979 and 2004.

== The attack ==
ETA had carried out similar attacks against Civil Guard barracks in Zaragoza in 1987, killing 12 people, and in Vic three and a half months before the Mutxamel attack, killing ten people. The Mutxamel barracks was home to six Civil Guards, three of them married and living there with their families.

To commit the attack, ETA used a Ford Fiesta, bearing false number plates, which had been stolen months earlier in the Basque country, loading it with 50 kilos of explosives. They used an anti-theft bar, attached to the steering wheel, to guide the direction, ignition and gears and pushed the driverless car towards the barracks. However it missed its target, crashing instead into the wall of a nearby bank. Having failed to detonate the bomb, they abandoned the vehicle. An hour later, employees of the bank began arriving for work and notified the police of the vehicle. Believing that they were dealing with a simple traffic accident, potentially caused by a drunk driver who had panicked and abandoned his vehicle, the police ordered the vehicle to be towed away. Inside the car pound, the bomb exploded, with the tow truck driver and the two police accompanying him killed instantly. A further 30 people were injured.

== Convictions ==
In 1995, Gonzalo Rodriguez Cordero and Jose Gabriel Zabala Erasun were each sentenced to 136 years in prison for unlawful use of motor vehicles, unlawfully replacing license plates, possession of explosives and as participants in a crime of assault, three of murder, four of causing injuries and one of terrorism.

In January 2007, three streets in the town were renamed in memory of the victims.
