= Mariano Rubio =

Spanish economist (1931–1999)

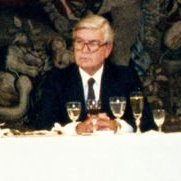
- Born: Mariano Rubio Jiménez; 14 November 1931; Burgos
- Died: 4 October 1999 (aged 67); Madrid
- Occupation: Economist
- Years active: 1960s–July 1992
- Known for: Governor of Bank of Spain (1984–1992); Ibercorp scandal
- Spouses: Isabel Azcárate (divorced) Carmen Posadas (m. 1988)

Mariano Rubio (14 November 1931–4 October 1999) was a Spanish economist who served as the governor of the Bank of Spain from 1984 to 1992. He was involved in a scandal known as the Ibercorp incident and was forced to resign from the office.

== Early life and education ==
Rubio was born in Burgos on 14 November 1931. He studied law, but he did not complete his studies. He later graduated from the University of Madrid receiving a bachelor's degree in economics. During his undergraduate studies he was part of the University Socialist Association and arrested due to his anti-Francoist activities.

== Career ==
Following his release from the prison Rubio left Spain for Paris where he worked at the Organization for Economic Cooperation and Development. He returned to Spain in 1963 and began to work at the treasury. In 1965 he was appointed deputy director of the research department of the Bank of Spain. Ángel Madroñero, the head of the department, was instrumental in his appointment.

Rubio became general director of financial policy department of the ministry of finance in 1970 and remained in the office until his resignation in 1972. Next year he was named as the head of Enagás company. Between 1977 and 1984 he was deputy governor of the Bank of Spain. He succeeded J. R. Álvarez Rendueles as governor of the bank in July 1984. Rubio's appointment was supported by the Economy Minister Carlos Solchaga. Rubio had to resign from the office in July 1992 due to his involvement in a scandal known as Ibercorp affair and was replaced by Luis Angel Rojo in the post. Rubio was accused of employing some confidential information to gain dividends in the stock market and of falsifying official documents.

During his tenure as governor of the bank Spanish credit market was radically transformed and became much more liberal than the previous periods.

== Later years, personal life and death ==
Following the Ibercorp case Carlos Solchaga resigned from the office. Miguel Boyer also implicated in the case, and both Boyer and Rubio in addition to others, including their wives, were taken to the court. Rubio arrested and jailed due to his involvement in the scandal in 1994.

Rubio married twice. He first married Isabel Azcárate. His second wife was Uruguay-born author Carmen Posadas with who he wed in January 1988. He died of colon cancer in Madrid on 4 October 1999.

== See also ==
- Delors Committee
