= ETA attacks in the Netherlands =

1989 and 1990 terrorist attacks

ETA attacks in Netherlands
- Part of Basque conflict
- Location: The Hague and Amsterdam, Netherlands
- Date: 1989-1990
- Target: Spanish interests
- Attack type: Bombings
- Deaths: 0
- Injuries: 5~
- Perpetrator: ETA

The Euskadi Ta Askatasuna (ETA) separatist organisation committed several attacks on Spanish consulates and businesses in the Netherlands in 1989 and 1990. The bomb attacks were the heaviest in the country since World War II.

- 24 October 1989, The Hague: Spanish consul J. Gil Catalina's car was blown up by a bomb. No injuries.
- 27 October 1989, The Hague: Two bombs explode at the Spanish commercial and employment offices in Patijnlaan and Riouwstraat.
- 6 December 1989, The Hague: The home of the Spanish ambassador, Manuel María Sassot Cañadas, in Lange Voorhout, was damaged by two grenades, believed to have been fired from the roof of a car.
- 30 June 1990, Amsterdam: Bomb attack at an office building in Overtoom where the airline Iberia is based. There were no injuries but damage was caused.
- 8 July 1990, Amsterdam: A bomb explodes at a Banco de Bilbao Vizcaya bank branch in Herengracht, damaging the building's façade. Three people were hurt from flying glass.

Contrary to the ETA's usual tactics, the group did not immediately claim the attacks, leading to police investigations into the perpetrators. Following the bomb at the Spanish ambassador's house, Spanish authorities asked the Dutch government for increased protection for their diplomats. Extra guards were deployed at Spanish consulates in the country. On 24 July 1990 the group claimed responsibility for the bombings in Amsterdam.

== See also ==
- 1988 IRA attacks in the Netherlands - another foreign group which committed attacks on Dutch territory at the time
