= Blue Party of Progressive Rightwing =

Blue Party of Progressive Rightwing (in Spanish: Partido Azul de Derecha Progresista) was a political party in Spain. It was registered with the election authorities in 1992.
