= Results of the 1994 European Parliament election in Spain =

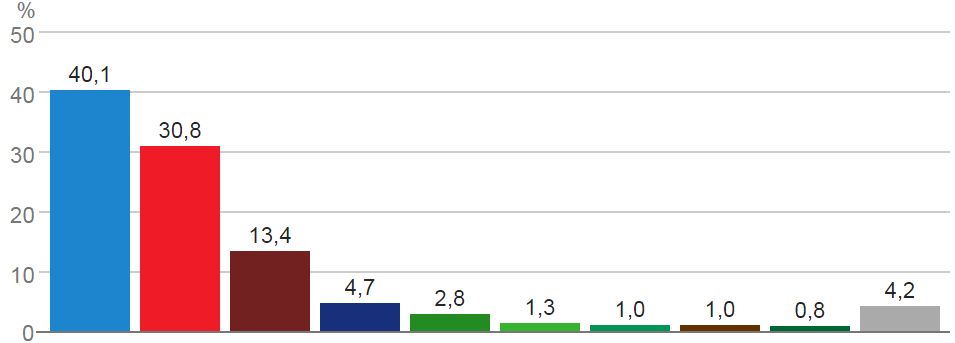
(Spain)	Main: 1994 European Parliament election in Spain
← 1989 12 June 1994 1999 →
Party		Votes	%	Seats
	PP	7,453,900	40.1%	28
	PSOE	5,719,707	30.8%	22
	IU	2,497,671	13.4%	9
	CiU	865,913	4.7%	3
	CN	518,532	2.8%	2
	PEP	239,339	1.3%	0
	Foro–CDS	183,418	1.0%	0
	HB	180,324	1.0%	0
	PA–PAP	140,445	0.8%	0
	Others	779,166	4.2%	0
Total		18,578,415	100.0%	64

This article presents the results breakdown of the election to the European Parliament held in Spain on 12 June 1994. The following tables show detailed results in each of the country's 17 autonomous communities and in the autonomous cities of Ceuta and Melilla.

== Nationwide ==
← Summary of the 12 June 1994 European Parliament election results in Spain →
Parties and alliances	Popular vote			Seats	
Parties and alliances	Votes	%	±pp	Total	+/−
People's Party (PP)	7,453,900	40.12	+18.71	28	+13
Spanish Socialist Workers' Party (PSOE)^{1}	5,719,707	30.79	−9.43	22	−5
United Left (IU)	2,497,671	13.44	+7.38	9	+5
Convergence and Union (CiU)^{2}	865,913	4.66	+0.12	3	+1
Nationalist Coalition (CN)^{3}	518,532	2.79	+0.18	2	+1
For the Europe of the Peoples (PEP)^{4}	239,339	1.29	−0.14	0	−1
Forum–Democratic and Social Centre (Foro–CDS)	183,418	0.99	−6.16	0	−5
Popular Unity (HB)	180,324	0.97	−0.73	0	−1
Andalusian Coalition–Andalusian Power (PA–PAP)^{5}	140,445	0.76	−1.10	0	−1
Galician Nationalist Bloc (BNG)	139,221	0.75	+0.46	0	±0
Green Group (GV)	109,567	0.59	New	0	±0
Ruiz-Mateos Group (Ruiz-Mateos)	82,410	0.44	−3.40	0	−2
The Greens–Ecologist Confederation of Catalonia (EV–CEC)^{6}	42,237	0.23	−0.07	0	±0
Communist Party of the Peoples of Spain (PCPE)	29,692	0.16	−0.34	0	±0
Hunting, Fishing, Nature, Tradition (CPNT)	29,025	0.16	New	0	±0
Revolutionary Workers' Party (POR)	16,144	0.09	New	0	±0
Asturianist Party (PAS)^{7}	14,846	0.08	+0.05	0	±0
United Extremadura (EU)^{8}	13,580	0.07	±0.00	0	±0
Spanish Phalanx of the CNSO (FE–JONS)	11,733	0.06	−0.09	0	±0
Regionalist Unity of Castile and León (URCL)	10,019	0.05	New	0	±0
Natural Law Party (PLN)	7,845	0.04	New	0	±0
Humanist Party (PH)	7,499	0.04	−0.08	0	±0
Coalition for a New Socialist Party (CNPS)^{9}	7,349	0.04	−0.07	0	±0
Regionalist Party of the Leonese Country (PREPAL)	6,197	0.03	New	0	±0
Independent Spanish Phalanx (FEI)	5,602	0.03	New	0	±0
Carlist Traditionalist Communion (CTC)	5,226	0.03	New	0	±0
Justice and Welfare Party (JyB)	4,992	0.03	New	0	±0
Extremaduran Regionalist Party (PREx)	4,836	0.03	New	0	±0
National Democratic Alternative (ADN)	4,689	0.03	New	0	±0
Carlist Party (PC)	4,640	0.02	−0.03	0	±0
Galician Alternative (AG)	4,431	0.02	New	0	±0
GPOR–PST (LVS) Coalition (GPOR–PST)^{10}	3,765	0.02	−0.22	0	±0
Lanzarote Independents Party (PIL)	0	0.00	New	0	±0
The Greens of the Region of Murcia (LVRM)	0	0.00	New	0	±0
Canarian Nationalist Party (PNC)	0	0.00	New	0	±0
Left of the Peoples (IP)^{11}	n/a	n/a	−0.81	0	−1
Blank ballots	213,621	1.15	−0.12		
Total	18,578,415			64	+4
Valid votes	18,578,415	99.54	+0.56		
Invalid votes	85,640	0.46	−0.56		
Votes cast / turnout	18,664,055	59.14	+4.43		
Abstentions	12,894,944	40.86	−4.43		
Registered voters	31,558,999				
Sources
Footnotes: ^{1} Spanish Socialist Workers' Party results are compared to the combined totals of Spanish Socialist Workers' Party and Left of the Peoples in the Basque Country and Navarre in the 1989 election.; ^{2} Convergence and Union results are compared to the combined totals of Convergence and Union and Left of the Peoples in the Balearic Islands and the Valencian Community in the 1989 election.; ^{3} Nationalist Coalition (1994) results are compared to the combined totals of Nationalist Coalition (1989)—not including results in Castile and León—and Federation of Regional Parties in the Valencian Community in the 1989 election.; ^{4} For the Europe of the Peoples (1994) results are compared to For the Europe of the Peoples (1989) totals in the 1989 election, not including results in Galicia.; ^{5} Andalusian Coalition–Andalusian Power results are compared to Andalusian Party totals in the 1989 election.; ^{6} The Greens–Ecologist Confederation of Catalonia results are compared to Green Alternative–Ecologist Movement of Catalonia totals in the 1989 election.; ^{7} Asturianist Party results are compared to Left of the Peoples totals in Asturias in the 1989 election.; ^{8} United Extremadura results are compared to Federation of Regional Parties totals in Extremadura in the 1989 election.; ^{9} Coalition for a New Socialist Party results are compared to Alliance for the Republic totals in the 1989 election.; ^{10} GPOR–PST (LVS) Coalition results are compared to Workers' Socialist Party–Revolutionary Workers' Party totals in the 1989 election.; ^{11} Left of the Peoples does not include results in Asturias, Basque Country, Balearic Islands, Navarre and Valencian Community.

== Autonomous communities ==
=== Andalusia ===
← Summary of the 12 June 1994 European Parliament election results in Andalusia →
Parties and alliances	Popular vote		
Parties and alliances	Votes	%	±pp
Spanish Socialist Workers' Party (PSOE)	1,479,280	41.07	−9.19
People's Party (PP)	1,254,932	34.84	+18.75
United Left/The Greens–Assembly for Andalusia (IULV–CA)	613,999	17.05	+8.00
Andalusian Coalition–Andalusian Power (PA–PAP)^{1}	136,046	3.78	−6.66
Forum–Democratic and Social Centre (Foro–CDS)	16,334	0.45	−3.61
Ruiz-Mateos Group (Ruiz-Mateos)	14,249	0.40	−3.70
Green Group (GV)	13,153	0.37	New
Hunting, Fishing, Nature, Tradition (CPNT)	9,217	0.26	New
Communist Party of the Peoples of Spain (PCPE)	5,952	0.17	−0.23
Revolutionary Workers' Party (POR)	3,124	0.09	New
Spanish Phalanx of the CNSO (FE–JONS)	2,403	0.07	−0.05
The Greens–Ecologist Confederation of Catalonia (EV–CEC)^{2}	2,334	0.06	±0.00
Popular Unity (HB)	1,805	0.05	−0.13
Coalition for a New Socialist Party (CNPS)^{3}	1,680	0.05	−0.03
Humanist Party (PH)	1,609	0.04	−0.03
Nationalist Coalition (CN)^{4}	1,407	0.04	−0.03
United Extremadura (EU)	1,208	0.03	New
Asturianist Party (PAS)	1,165	0.03	New
Convergence and Union (CiU)	1,165	0.03	−0.02
Regionalist Unity of Castile and León (URCL)	1,084	0.03	New
Independent Spanish Phalanx (FEI)	1,043	0.03	New
Natural Law Party (PLN)	1,040	0.03	New
Regionalist Party of the Leonese Country (PREPAL)	1,016	0.03	New
Justice and Welfare Party (JyB)	885	0.02	New
Carlist Traditionalist Communion (CTC)	862	0.02	New
Galician Nationalist Bloc (BNG)	838	0.02	−0.02
GPOR–PST (LVS) Coalition (GPOR–PST)^{5}	818	0.02	−0.17
National Democratic Alternative (ADN)	777	0.02	New
For the Europe of the Peoples (PEP)^{6}	696	0.02	−0.02
Carlist Party (PC)	672	0.02	−0.01
Galician Alternative (AG)	570	0.02	New
Extremaduran Regionalist Party (PREx)	565	0.02	New
The Greens of the Region of Murcia (LVRM)	0	0.00	New
Blank ballots	30,060	0.83	+0.16
Total	3,601,988		
Valid votes	3,601,988	99.40	+0.20
Invalid votes	21,720	0.60	−0.20
Votes cast / turnout	3,623,708	67.23	+14.48
Abstentions	1,766,036	32.77	−14.48
Registered voters	5,389,744		
Sources
Footnotes: ^{1} Andalusian Coalition–Andalusian Power results are compared to Andalusian Party totals in the 1989 election.; ^{2} The Greens–Ecologist Confederation of Catalonia results are compared to Green Alternative–Ecologist Movement of Catalonia totals in the 1989 election.; ^{3} Coalition for a New Socialist Party results are compared to Alliance for the Republic totals in the 1989 election.; ^{4} Nationalist Coalition (1994) results are compared to Nationalist Coalition (1989) totals in the 1989 election.; ^{5} GPOR–PST (LVS) Coalition results are compared to Workers' Socialist Party–Revolutionary Workers' Party totals in the 1989 election.; ^{6} For the Europe of the Peoples (1994) results are compared to For the Europe of the Peoples (1989) totals in the 1989 election.

=== Aragon ===
← Summary of the 12 June 1994 European Parliament election results in Aragon →
Parties and alliances	Popular vote		
Parties and alliances	Votes	%	±pp
People's Party (PP)	257,637	44.90	+18.28
Spanish Socialist Workers' Party (PSOE)	164,732	28.71	−12.93
United Left (IU)	78,653	13.71	+7.40
Aragonese Party (Nationalist Coalition) (PAR)	44,132	7.69	New
Forum–Democratic and Social Centre (Foro–CDS)	6,200	1.08	−6.73
Green Group (GV)	3,155	0.55	New
Ruiz-Mateos Group (Ruiz-Mateos)	2,824	0.49	−5.03
Hunting, Fishing, Nature, Tradition (CPNT)	2,033	0.35	New
Popular Unity (HB)	592	0.10	−0.27
Communist Party of the Peoples of Spain (PCPE)	575	0.10	−0.14
Convergence and Union (CiU)	559	0.10	−0.04
Revolutionary Workers' Party (POR)	387	0.07	New
The Greens–Ecologist Confederation of Catalonia (EV–CEC)^{1}	336	0.06	−0.02
Spanish Phalanx of the CNSO (FE–JONS)	301	0.05	−0.12
Natural Law Party (PLN)	268	0.05	New
Republican Left of Catalonia–Catalan Action (PEP) (ERC–AC)	234	0.04	New
United Extremadura (EU)	203	0.04	New
Humanist Party (PH)	199	0.03	−0.14
Asturianist Party (PAS)	197	0.03	New
Coalition for a New Socialist Party (CNPS)^{2}	183	0.03	−0.10
Carlist Party (PC)	176	0.03	−0.05
Independent Spanish Phalanx (FEI)	167	0.03	New
National Democratic Alternative (ADN)	152	0.03	New
Carlist Traditionalist Communion (CTC)	131	0.02	New
Justice and Welfare Party (JyB)	124	0.02	New
Regionalist Unity of Castile and León (URCL)	123	0.02	New
Galician Nationalist Bloc (BNG)	117	0.02	−0.02
Andalusian Coalition–Andalusian Power (PA–PAP)^{3}	109	0.02	−0.09
Extremaduran Regionalist Party (PREx)	103	0.02	New
Regionalist Party of the Leonese Country (PREPAL)	87	0.02	New
GPOR–PST (LVS) Coalition (GPOR–PST)^{4}	81	0.01	−0.30
Galician Alternative (AG)	55	0.01	New
The Greens of the Region of Murcia (LVRM)	0	0.00	New
Blank ballots	8,960	1.56	−0.61
Total	573,785		
Valid votes	573,785	99.59	+0.92
Invalid votes	2,345	0.41	−0.92
Votes cast / turnout	576,130	58.44	+4.18
Abstentions	409,686	41.56	−4.18
Registered voters	985,816		
Sources
Footnotes: ^{1} The Greens–Ecologist Confederation of Catalonia results are compared to Green Alternative–Ecologist Movement of Catalonia totals in the 1989 election.; ^{2} Coalition for a New Socialist Party results are compared to Alliance for the Republic totals in the 1989 election.; ^{3} Andalusian Coalition–Andalusian Power results are compared to Andalusian Party totals in the 1989 election.; ^{4} GPOR–PST (LVS) Coalition results are compared to Workers' Socialist Party–Revolutionary Workers' Party totals in the 1989 election.

=== Asturias ===
← Summary of the 12 June 1994 European Parliament election results in Asturias →
Parties and alliances	Popular vote		
Parties and alliances	Votes	%	±pp
People's Party (PP)	231,151	42.60	+20.05
Spanish Socialist Workers' Party (PSOE)	173,986	32.07	−9.41
United Left (IU)	105,723	19.49	+7.78
Asturianist Party (PAS)	9,679	1.78	+0.64
Forum–Democratic and Social Centre (Foro–CDS)	8,167	1.51	−9.80
Green Group (GV)	2,572	0.47	New
Ruiz-Mateos Group (Ruiz-Mateos)	1,134	0.21	−2.94
Communist Party of the Peoples of Spain (PCPE)	980	0.18	−0.33
Popular Unity (HB)	639	0.12	−0.43
Revolutionary Workers' Party (POR)	428	0.08	New
Spanish Phalanx of the CNSO (FE–JONS)	319	0.06	−0.08
Hunting, Fishing, Nature, Tradition (CPNT)	298	0.05	New
The Greens–Ecologist Confederation of Catalonia (EV–CEC)^{1}	260	0.05	−0.01
Galician Nationalist Bloc (BNG)	162	0.03	−0.01
Natural Law Party (PLN)	157	0.03	New
Coalition for a New Socialist Party (CNPS)^{2}	152	0.03	−0.05
Convergence and Union (CiU)	144	0.03	−0.02
National Democratic Alternative (ADN)	143	0.03	New
Humanist Party (PH)	140	0.03	−0.07
Regionalist Unity of Castile and León (URCL)	130	0.02	New
Nationalist Coalition (CN)^{3}	111	0.02	−0.03
Independent Spanish Phalanx (FEI)	107	0.02	New
For the Europe of the Peoples (PEP)^{4}	101	0.02	−0.03
Justice and Welfare Party (JyB)	98	0.02	New
United Extremadura (EU)	94	0.02	New
Regionalist Party of the Leonese Country (PREPAL)	89	0.02	New
Carlist Traditionalist Communion (CTC)	84	0.02	New
Extremaduran Regionalist Party (PREx)	76	0.01	New
Galician Alternative (AG)	69	0.01	New
Carlist Party (PC)	67	0.01	−0.03
Andalusian Coalition–Andalusian Power (PA–PAP)^{5}	64	0.01	−0.03
GPOR–PST (LVS) Coalition (GPOR–PST)^{6}	58	0.01	−0.25
The Greens of the Region of Murcia (LVRM)	0	0.00	New
Blank ballots	5,179	0.95	−0.33
Total	542,561		
Valid votes	542,561	99.63	+0.96
Invalid votes	1,997	0.37	−0.96
Votes cast / turnout	544,558	58.20	+3.84
Abstentions	391,070	41.80	−3.84
Registered voters	935,628		
Sources
Footnotes: ^{1} The Greens–Ecologist Confederation of Catalonia results are compared to Green Alternative–Ecologist Movement of Catalonia totals in the 1989 election.; ^{2} Coalition for a New Socialist Party results are compared to Alliance for the Republic totals in the 1989 election.; ^{3} Nationalist Coalition (1994) results are compared to Nationalist Coalition (1989) totals in the 1989 election.; ^{4} For the Europe of the Peoples (1994) results are compared to For the Europe of the Peoples (1989) totals in the 1989 election.; ^{5} Andalusian Coalition–Andalusian Power results are compared to Andalusian Party totals in the 1989 election.; ^{6} GPOR–PST (LVS) Coalition results are compared to Workers' Socialist Party–Revolutionary Workers' Party totals in the 1989 election.

=== Balearics ===
← Summary of the 12 June 1994 European Parliament election results in the Balearics →
Parties and alliances	Popular vote		
Parties and alliances	Votes	%	±pp
People's Party (PP)	147,376	50.56	+17.68
Spanish Socialist Workers' Party (PSOE)	72,430	24.85	−10.73
United Left (IU)	28,782	9.87	+6.41
Socialist Party of Mallorca–Nationalists of Majorca (CiU) (PSM–NM)^{1}	17,404	5.97	+1.30
Majorcan Union (Nationalist Coalition) (UM)	7,673	2.63	New
Green Group (GV)	2,564	0.88	New
Forum–Democratic and Social Centre (Foro–CDS)	2,383	0.82	−7.35
Nationalist and Ecologist Agreement–Republican Left (PEP) (ENE–ERC)	2,350	0.81	New
The Greens–Ecologist Confederation of Catalonia (EV–CEC)^{2}	1,757	0.60	+0.24
Ruiz-Mateos Group (Ruiz-Mateos)	1,685	0.58	−5.16
Communist Party of the Peoples of Spain (PCPE)	488	0.18	−0.33
Revolutionary Workers' Party (POR)	353	0.08	New
Popular Unity (HB)	315	0.11	−0.26
Hunting, Fishing, Nature, Tradition (CPNT)	219	0.08	New
Spanish Phalanx of the CNSO (FE–JONS)	212	0.07	−0.13
Natural Law Party (PLN)	187	0.06	New
United Extremadura (EU)	179	0.06	New
Coalition for a New Socialist Party (CNPS)^{3}	174	0.06	−0.08
Independent Spanish Phalanx (FEI)	143	0.05	New
Galician Nationalist Bloc (BNG)	126	0.04	−0.02
Andalusian Coalition–Andalusian Power (PA–PAP)^{4}	120	0.04	−0.35
Humanist Party (PH)	118	0.04	−0.08
Regionalist Unity of Castile and León (URCL)	108	0.04	New
Asturianist Party (PAS)	106	0.04	New
National Democratic Alternative (ADN)	99	0.03	New
Justice and Welfare Party (JyB)	97	0.03	New
Carlist Party (PC)	75	0.03	−0.04
Extremaduran Regionalist Party (PREx)	72	0.02	New
GPOR–PST (LVS) Coalition (GPOR–PST)^{5}	70	0.02	−0.23
Carlist Traditionalist Communion (CTC)	69	0.02	New
Galician Alternative (AG)	65	0.02	New
Regionalist Party of the Leonese Country (PREPAL)	62	0.02	New
The Greens of the Region of Murcia (LVRM)	0	0.00	New
Blank ballots	3,638	1.25	−0.26
Total	291,499		
Valid votes	291,499	99.61	+0.80
Invalid votes	1,151	0.39	−0.80
Votes cast / turnout	292,650	49.78	+5.04
Abstentions	295,219	50.22	−5.04
Registered voters	587,869		
Sources
Footnotes: ^{1} Socialist Party of Mallorca–Nationalists of Majorca (CiU) results are compared to the combined totals of Socialist Party of Mallorca and Convergence and Union in the 1989 election.; ^{2} The Greens–Ecologist Confederation of Catalonia results are compared to Green Alternative–Ecologist Movement of Catalonia totals in the 1989 election.; ^{3} Coalition for a New Socialist Party results are compared to Alliance for the Republic totals in the 1989 election.; ^{4} Andalusian Coalition–Andalusian Power results are compared to Andalusian Party totals in the 1989 election.; ^{5} GPOR–PST (LVS) Coalition results are compared to Workers' Socialist Party–Revolutionary Workers' Party totals in the 1989 election.

=== Basque Country ===
← Summary of the 12 June 1994 European Parliament election results in the Basque Country →
Parties and alliances	Popular vote		
Parties and alliances	Votes	%	±pp
Basque Nationalist Party (Nationalist Coalition) (EAJ/PNV)	233,626	25.85	+4.90
Socialist Party of the Basque Country–Basque Country Left (PSE–EE (PSOE))^{1}	165,063	18.26	−9.83
People's Party (PP)	158,010	17.48	+9.87
Popular Unity (HB)	140,859	15.59	−3.55
United Left (IU–EB)	86,435	9.56	+7.79
Basque Solidarity (For the Europe of the Peoples) (EA)	78,418	8.68	−4.32
Green Group (GV)	7,133	0.79	New
Forum–Democratic and Social Centre (Foro–CDS)	3,901	0.43	−2.29
Ruiz-Mateos Group (Ruiz-Mateos)	2,358	0.26	−1.17
The Greens–Ecologist Confederation of Catalonia (EV–CEC)^{2}	1,496	0.17	+0.04
Communist Party of the Peoples of Spain (PCPE)	1,146	0.13	−0.07
Hunting, Fishing, Nature, Tradition (CPNT)	1,069	0.12	New
Galician Nationalist Bloc (BNG)	761	0.08	+0.02
Natural Law Party (PLN)	662	0.07	New
United Extremadura (EU)	580	0.06	New
Revolutionary Workers' Party (LIA)	516	0.06	New
Carlist Party (PC)	442	0.05	−0.02
Humanist Party (PH)	431	0.05	−0.06
Carlist Traditionalist Communion (CTC)	404	0.04	New
Asturianist Party (PAS)	394	0.04	New
Regionalist Party of the Leonese Country (PREPAL)	333	0.04	New
Regionalist Unity of Castile and León (URCL)	301	0.03	New
Justice and Welfare Party (JyB)	301	0.03	New
Convergence and Union (CiU)	295	0.03	−0.02
Coalition for a New Socialist Party (CNPS)^{3}	271	0.03	−0.04
Spanish Phalanx of the CNSO (FE–JONS)	233	0.03	−0.03
Extremaduran Regionalist Party (PREx)	192	0.02	New
Andalusian Coalition–Andalusian Power (PA–PAP)^{4}	178	0.02	−0.04
Independent Spanish Phalanx (FEI)	152	0.02	New
National Democratic Alternative (ADN)	150	0.02	New
GPOR–PST (LVS) Coalition (GPOR–PST)^{5}	141	0.02	−0.16
Galician Alternative (AG)	124	0.01	New
The Greens of the Region of Murcia (LVRM)	0	0.00	New
Blank ballots	17,340	1.92	+0.83
Total	903,715		
Valid votes	903,715	99.30	+0.16
Invalid votes	6,381	0.70	−0.16
Votes cast / turnout	910,096	52.28	−6.21
Abstentions	830,735	47.72	+6.21
Registered voters	1,740,831		
Sources
Footnotes: ^{1} Spanish Socialist Workers' Party results are compared to the combined totals of Socialist Party of the Basque Country and Basque Country Left in the 1989 election.; ^{2} The Greens–Ecologist Confederation of Catalonia results are compared to Green Alternative–Ecologist Movement of Catalonia totals in the 1989 election.; ^{3} Coalition for a New Socialist Party results are compared to Alliance for the Republic totals in the 1989 election.; ^{4} Andalusian Coalition–Andalusian Power results are compared to Andalusian Party totals in the 1989 election.; ^{5} GPOR–PST (LVS) Coalition results are compared to Workers' Socialist Party–Revolutionary Workers' Party totals in the 1989 election.

=== Canary Islands ===
← Summary of the 12 June 1994 European Parliament election results in the Canary Islands →
Parties and alliances	Popular vote		
Parties and alliances	Votes	%	±pp
People's Party (PP)	264,840	43.91	+27.27
Spanish Socialist Workers' Party (PSOE)	149,626	24.81	−10.08
Canarian Coalition (Nationalist Coalition) (CC)^{1}	113,677	18.85	+7.70
Canarian United Left (IUC)	50,232	8.33	+3.04
Forum–Democratic and Social Centre (Foro–CDS)	4,274	0.71	−15.44
Green Group (GV)	3,869	0.64	New
Ruiz-Mateos Group (Ruiz-Mateos)	1,844	0.31	−4.21
Communist Party of the Peoples of Spain (PCPE)	1,383	0.23	−0.22
Popular Unity (HB)	671	0.11	−0.41
Hunting, Fishing, Nature, Tradition (CPNT)	665	0.11	New
Revolutionary Workers' Party (POR)	572	0.09	New
The Greens–Ecologist Confederation of Catalonia (EV–CEC)^{2}	544	0.09	−0.06
Convergence and Union (CiU)	481	0.08	−0.06
United Extremadura (EU)	456	0.08	New
Coalition for a New Socialist Party (CNPS)^{3}	416	0.07	−0.10
Humanist Party (PH)	385	0.06	−0.13
Galician Nationalist Bloc (BNG)	361	0.06	−0.05
GPOR–PST (LVS) Coalition (GPOR–PST)^{4}	346	0.06	−0.35
Natural Law Party (PLN)	342	0.06	New
Regionalist Unity of Castile and León (URCL)	315	0.05	New
Spanish Phalanx of the CNSO (FE–JONS)	302	0.05	−0.10
Asturianist Party (PAS)	298	0.05	New
Andalusian Coalition–Andalusian Power (PA–PAP)^{5}	284	0.05	−0.09
Carlist Traditionalist Communion (CTC)	266	0.04	New
National Democratic Alternative (ADN)	248	0.04	New
Independent Spanish Phalanx (FEI)	244	0.04	New
For the Europe of the Peoples (PEP)^{6}	244	0.04	−0.08
Justice and Welfare Party (JyB)	239	0.04	New
Extremaduran Regionalist Party (PREx)	205	0.03	New
Galician Alternative (AG)	192	0.03	New
Carlist Party (PC)	169	0.03	−0.05
Regionalist Party of the Leonese Country (PREPAL)	165	0.03	New
The Greens of the Region of Murcia (LVRM)	0	0.00	New
Canarian Nationalist Party (PNC)	0	0.00	New
Lanzarote Independents Party (PIL)	0	0.00	New
Blank ballots	4,983	0.83	−0.18
Total	603,138		
Valid votes	603,138	99.64	+0.65
Invalid votes	2,192	0.36	−0.65
Votes cast / turnout	605,330	49.87	+0.38
Abstentions	608,605	50.13	−0.38
Registered voters	1,213,935		
Sources
Footnotes: ^{1} Canarian Coalition results are compared to Canarian Independent Groups totals in the 1989 election.; ^{2} The Greens–Ecologist Confederation of Catalonia results are compared to Green Alternative–Ecologist Movement of Catalonia totals in the 1989 election.; ^{3} Coalition for a New Socialist Party results are compared to Alliance for the Republic totals in the 1989 election.; ^{4} GPOR–PST (LVS) Coalition results are compared to Workers' Socialist Party–Revolutionary Workers' Party totals in the 1989 election.; ^{5} Andalusian Coalition–Andalusian Power results are compared to Andalusian Party totals in the 1989 election.; ^{6} For the Europe of the Peoples (1994) results are compared to For the Europe of the Peoples (1989) totals in the 1989 election.

=== Cantabria ===
← Summary of the 12 June 1994 European Parliament election results in Cantabria →
Parties and alliances	Popular vote		
Parties and alliances	Votes	%	±pp
People's Party (PP)	130,872	49.54	+17.55
Spanish Socialist Workers' Party (PSOE)	85,052	32.19	−8.10
United Left (IU)	32,392	12.26	+8.08
Forum–Democratic and Social Centre (Foro–CDS)	4,143	1.57	−5.42
Green Group (GV)	1,798	0.68	New
Ruiz-Mateos Group (Ruiz-Mateos)	1,148	0.43	−3.91
Hunting, Fishing, Nature, Tradition (CPNT)	573	0.22	New
Communist Party of the Peoples of Spain (PCPE)	485	0.18	−0.27
Popular Unity (HB)	465	0.18	−0.37
Spanish Phalanx of the CNSO (FE–JONS)	349	0.13	−0.22
The Greens–Ecologist Confederation of Catalonia (EV–CEC)^{1}	220	0.08	+0.01
Nationalist Coalition (CN)^{2}	211	0.08	−0.01
Revolutionary Workers' Party (POR)	197	0.07	New
Convergence and Union (CiU)	133	0.05	−0.01
Natural Law Party (PLN)	117	0.04	New
Regionalist Unity of Castile and León (URCL)	113	0.04	New
Humanist Party (PH)	106	0.04	−0.12
Commoners' Land–Castilian Nationalist Party (PEP) (TC–PNC)	100	0.04	New
United Extremadura (EU)	100	0.04	New
Coalition for a New Socialist Party (CNPS)^{3}	96	0.04	−0.09
Independent Spanish Phalanx (FEI)	92	0.03	New
Carlist Party (PC)	86	0.03	−0.01
Justice and Welfare Party (JyB)	85	0.03	New
Galician Nationalist Bloc (BNG)	71	0.03	−0.02
Carlist Traditionalist Communion (CTC)	67	0.03	New
National Democratic Alternative (ADN)	66	0.02	New
Asturianist Party (PAS)	64	0.02	New
Extremaduran Regionalist Party (PREx)	53	0.02	New
GPOR–PST (LVS) Coalition (GPOR–PST)^{4}	49	0.02	−0.26
Regionalist Party of the Leonese Country (PREPAL)	45	0.02	New
Galician Alternative (AG)	42	0.02	New
Andalusian Coalition–Andalusian Power (PA–PAP)^{5}	40	0.02	−0.06
The Greens of the Region of Murcia (LVRM)	0	0.00	New
Blank ballots	4,761	1.80	+0.12
Total	264,191		
Valid votes	264,191	99.47	+0.70
Invalid votes	1,417	0.53	−0.70
Votes cast / turnout	265,608	61.92	+1.39
Abstentions	163,341	38.08	−1.39
Registered voters	428,949		
Sources
Footnotes: ^{1} The Greens–Ecologist Confederation of Catalonia results are compared to Green Alternative–Ecologist Movement of Catalonia totals in the 1989 election.; ^{2} Nationalist Coalition (1994) results are compared to Nationalist Coalition (1989) totals in the 1989 election.; ^{3} Coalition for a New Socialist Party results are compared to Alliance for the Republic totals in the 1989 election.; ^{4} GPOR–PST (LVS) Coalition results are compared to Workers' Socialist Party–Revolutionary Workers' Party totals in the 1989 election.; ^{5} Andalusian Coalition–Andalusian Power results are compared to Andalusian Party totals in the 1989 election.

=== Castile and León ===
← Summary of the 12 June 1994 European Parliament election results in Castile and León →
Parties and alliances	Popular vote		
Parties and alliances	Votes	%	±pp
People's Party (PP)	697,369	53.73	+21.40
Spanish Socialist Workers' Party (PSOE)	374,327	28.84	−7.61
United Left (IU)	142,548	10.98	+6.97
Forum–Democratic and Social Centre (Foro–CDS)	23,526	1.81	−11.37
Green Group (GV)	8,488	0.65	New
Ruiz-Mateos Group (Ruiz-Mateos)	6,083	0.47	−3.91
Regionalist Unity of Castile and León (URCL)	4,446	0.34	New
Commoners' Land–Castilian Nationalist Party (PEP) (TC–PNC)	3,011	0.23	New
Regionalist Party of the Leonese Country (PREPAL)	2,250	0.17	New
Communist Party of the Peoples of Spain (PCPE)	1,898	0.15	−0.13
Hunting, Fishing, Nature, Tradition (CPNT)	1,676	0.13	New
Popular Unity (HB)	1,107	0.09	−0.19
Spanish Phalanx of the CNSO (FE–JONS)	1,103	0.08	−0.12
Revolutionary Workers' Party (POR)	1,059	0.08	New
The Greens–Ecologist Confederation of Catalonia (EV–CEC)^{1}	965	0.07	−0.02
Natural Law Party (PLN)	644	0.05	New
Coalition for a New Socialist Party (CNPS)^{2}	571	0.04	−0.12
Convergence and Union (CiU)	556	0.04	−0.03
Humanist Party (PH)	545	0.04	−0.10
Justice and Welfare Party (JyB)	536	0.04	New
Nationalist Coalition (CN)	519	0.04	New
Galician Nationalist Bloc (BNG)	504	0.04	−0.02
Independent Spanish Phalanx (FEI)	437	0.03	New
National Democratic Alternative (ADN)	395	0.03	New
United Extremadura (EU)	394	0.03	New
Asturianist Party (PAS)	386	0.03	New
Carlist Traditionalist Communion (CTC)	340	0.03	New
Extremaduran Regionalist Party (PREx)	300	0.02	New
Carlist Party (PC)	288	0.02	−0.03
Andalusian Coalition–Andalusian Power (PA–PAP)^{3}	281	0.02	−0.06
GPOR–PST (LVS) Coalition (GPOR–PST)^{4}	259	0.02	−0.26
Galician Alternative (AG)	257	0.02	New
The Greens of the Region of Murcia (LVRM)	0	0.00	New
Blank ballots	20,750	1.60	−0.23
Total	1,297,818		
Valid votes	1,297,818	99.48	+1.03
Invalid votes	6,761	0.52	−1.03
Votes cast / turnout	1,304,579	61.98	+4.44
Abstentions	800,266	38.02	−4.44
Registered voters	2,104,845		
Sources
Footnotes: ^{1} The Greens–Ecologist Confederation of Catalonia results are compared to Green Alternative–Ecologist Movement of Catalonia totals in the 1989 election.; ^{2} Coalition for a New Socialist Party results are compared to Alliance for the Republic totals in the 1989 election.; ^{3} Andalusian Coalition–Andalusian Power results are compared to Andalusian Party totals in the 1989 election.; ^{4} GPOR–PST (LVS) Coalition results are compared to Workers' Socialist Party–Revolutionary Workers' Party totals in the 1989 election.

=== Castilla–La Mancha ===
← Summary of the 12 June 1994 European Parliament election results in Castilla–La Mancha →
Parties and alliances	Popular vote		
Parties and alliances	Votes	%	±pp
People's Party (PP)	417,409	47.93	+18.71
Spanish Socialist Workers' Party (PSOE)	329,979	37.89	−10.39
United Left (IU)	91,200	10.47	+5.08
Forum–Democratic and Social Centre (Foro–CDS)	8,936	1.03	−6.34
Green Group (GV)	4,318	0.50	New
Ruiz-Mateos Group (Ruiz-Mateos)	2,249	0.26	−2.74
Communist Party of the Peoples of Spain (PCPE)	972	0.11	−0.21
Hunting, Fishing, Nature, Tradition (CPNT)	763	0.09	New
Revolutionary Workers' Party (POR)	625	0.07	New
Spanish Phalanx of the CNSO (FE–JONS)	623	0.07	−0.19
The Greens–Ecologist Confederation of Catalonia (EV–CEC)^{1}	536	0.07	+0.01
Commoners' Land–Castilian Nationalist Party (PEP) (TC–PNC)	508	0.06	New
Natural Law Party (PLN)	292	0.03	New
Humanist Party (PH)	287	0.03	−0.07
Regionalist Unity of Castile and León (URCL)	284	0.03	New
Popular Unity (HB)	279	0.03	−0.11
Independent Spanish Phalanx (FEI)	241	0.03	New
Convergence and Union (CiU)	224	0.03	−0.03
Regionalist Party of the Leonese Country (PREPAL)	211	0.02	New
Nationalist Coalition (CN)^{2}	187	0.02	−0.03
Coalition for a New Socialist Party (CNPS)^{3}	184	0.02	−0.09
United Extremadura (EU)	184	0.02	New
Justice and Welfare Party (JyB)	179	0.02	New
Galician Nationalist Bloc (BNG)	178	0.02	−0.02
Andalusian Coalition–Andalusian Power (PA–PAP)^{4}	164	0.02	−0.06
Asturianist Party (PAS)	153	0.02	New
National Democratic Alternative (ADN)	145	0.02	New
Carlist Party (PC)	124	0.01	−0.03
GPOR–PST (LVS) Coalition (GPOR–PST)^{5}	120	0.01	−0.20
Extremaduran Regionalist Party (PREx)	116	0.01	New
Carlist Traditionalist Communion (CTC)	111	0.01	New
Galician Alternative (AG)	103	0.01	New
The Greens of the Region of Murcia (LVRM)	0	0.00	New
Blank ballots	8,939	1.03	−0.03
Total	870,823		
Valid votes	870,823	99.52	+0.62
Invalid votes	4,195	0.48	−0.62
Votes cast / turnout	875,018	65.46	+5.68
Abstentions	461,788	34.54	−5.68
Registered voters	1,336,806		
Sources
Footnotes: ^{1} The Greens–Ecologist Confederation of Catalonia results are compared to Green Alternative–Ecologist Movement of Catalonia totals in the 1989 election.; ^{2} Nationalist Coalition (1994) results are compared to Nationalist Coalition (1989) totals in the 1989 election.; ^{3} Coalition for a New Socialist Party results are compared to Alliance for the Republic totals in the 1989 election.; ^{4} Andalusian Coalition–Andalusian Power results are compared to Andalusian Party totals in the 1989 election.; ^{5} GPOR–PST (LVS) Coalition results are compared to Workers' Socialist Party–Revolutionary Workers' Party totals in the 1989 election.

=== Catalonia ===
← Summary of the 12 June 1994 European Parliament election results in Catalonia →
Parties and alliances	Popular vote		
Parties and alliances	Votes	%	±pp
Convergence and Union (CiU)	806,610	31.50	+3.97
Socialists' Party of Catalonia (PSC–PSOE)	721,374	28.17	−8.19
People's Party (PP)	473,716	18.50	+9.90
United Left–Initiative for Catalonia (IU–IC)	283,779	11.08	+5.55
Republican Left of Catalonia–Catalan Action (PEP) (ERC–AC)	141,285	5.52	+2.23
The Greens–Ecologist Confederation of Catalonia (EV–CEC)^{1}	25,420	0.99	−0.46
Forum–Democratic and Social Centre (Foro–CDS)	17,286	0.68	−2.98
Green Group (GV)	14,665	0.57	New
Ruiz-Mateos Group (Ruiz-Mateos)	10,421	0.41	−2.47
Communist Party of the Peoples of Spain (PCPE)	6,671	0.26	−1.17
Popular Unity (HB)	4,481	0.17	−0.48
Hunting, Fishing, Nature, Tradition (CPNT)	3,343	0.13	New
Revolutionary Workers' Party (POR)	3,195	0.12	New
Galician Nationalist Bloc (BNG)	1,721	0.07	+0.01
United Extremadura (EU)	1,434	0.06	New
Spanish Phalanx of the CNSO (FE–JONS)	1,419	0.06	−0.05
Nationalist Coalition (CN)^{2}	1,357	0.05	−0.02
Andalusian Coalition–Andalusian Power (PA–PAP)^{3}	1,247	0.05	−0.41
Natural Law Party (PLN)	1,221	0.05	New
Coalition for a New Socialist Party (CNPS)^{4}	1,057	0.04	−0.06
Humanist Party (PH)	1,018	0.04	−0.09
National Democratic Alternative (ADN)	875	0.03	New
Regionalist Unity of Castile and León (URCL)	813	0.03	New
Carlist Traditionalist Communion (CTC)	759	0.03	New
Independent Spanish Phalanx (FEI)	728	0.03	New
Regionalist Party of the Leonese Country (PREPAL)	727	0.03	New
GPOR–PST (LVS) Coalition (GPOR–PST)^{5}	719	0.03	−0.27
Asturianist Party (PAS)	698	0.03	New
Carlist Party (PC)	661	0.03	−0.01
Justice and Welfare Party (JyB)	658	0.03	New
Extremaduran Regionalist Party (PREx)	570	0.02	New
Galician Alternative (AG)	431	0.02	New
The Greens of the Region of Murcia (LVRM)	0	0.00	New
Blank ballots	30,431	1.19	−0.07
Total	2,560,790		
Valid votes	2,560,790	99.59	+0.39
Invalid votes	10,648	0.41	−0.39
Votes cast / turnout	2,571,438	51.89	+0.36
Abstentions	2,384,323	48.11	−0.36
Registered voters	4,955,761		
Sources
Footnotes: ^{1} The Greens–Ecologist Confederation of Catalonia results are compared to Green Alternative–Ecologist Movement of Catalonia totals in the 1989 election.; ^{2} Nationalist Coalition (1994) results are compared to Nationalist Coalition (1989) totals in the 1989 election.; ^{3} Andalusian Coalition–Andalusian Power results are compared to Andalusian Party totals in the 1989 election.; ^{4} Coalition for a New Socialist Party results are compared to Alliance for the Republic totals in the 1989 election.; ^{5} GPOR–PST (LVS) Coalition results are compared to Workers' Socialist Party–Revolutionary Workers' Party totals in the 1989 election.

=== Extremadura ===
← Summary of the 12 June 1994 European Parliament election results in Extremadura →
Parties and alliances	Popular vote		
Parties and alliances	Votes	%	±pp
Spanish Socialist Workers' Party (PSOE)	248,375	45.02	−9.77
People's Party (PP)	221,889	40.22	+18.45
United Left (IU)	59,054	10.70	+5.81
United Extremadura (EU)	5,457	0.99	−1.34
Forum–Democratic and Social Centre (Foro–CDS)	3,778	0.68	−7.92
Green Group (GV)	2,024	0.37	New
Extremaduran Regionalist Party (PREx)	1,270	0.23	New
Ruiz-Mateos Group (Ruiz-Mateos)	1,091	0.20	−2.26
Communist Party of the Peoples of Spain (PCPE)	891	0.16	−0.26
Revolutionary Workers' Party (POR)	513	0.09	New
Hunting, Fishing, Nature, Tradition (CPNT)	409	0.07	New
Spanish Phalanx of the CNSO (FE–JONS)	271	0.05	−0.15
The Greens–Ecologist Confederation of Catalonia (EV–CEC)^{1}	246	0.04	−0.02
Nationalist Coalition (CN)^{2}	238	0.04	+0.01
Coalition for a New Socialist Party (CNPS)^{3}	229	0.04	−0.06
Regionalist Unity of Castile and León (URCL)	170	0.03	New
Natural Law Party (PLN)	167	0.03	New
Independent Spanish Phalanx (FEI)	147	0.03	New
Convergence and Union (CiU)	142	0.03	−0.02
Humanist Party (PH)	116	0.02	−0.04
Andalusian Coalition–Andalusian Power (PA–PAP)^{4}	115	0.02	−0.05
Justice and Welfare Party (JyB)	102	0.02	New
Asturianist Party (PAS)	101	0.02	New
Galician Nationalist Bloc (BNG)	91	0.02	−0.02
National Democratic Alternative (ADN)	84	0.02	New
GPOR–PST (LVS) Coalition (GPOR–PST)^{5}	84	0.02	−0.21
Carlist Party (PC)	81	0.01	−0.02
Carlist Traditionalist Communion (CTC)	75	0.01	New
Galician Alternative (AG)	70	0.01	New
For the Europe of the Peoples (PEP)^{6}	69	0.01	New
Regionalist Party of the Leonese Country (PREPAL)	59	0.01	New
The Greens of the Region of Murcia (LVRM)	0	0.00	New
Blank ballots	4,314	0.78	−0.03
Total	551,722		
Valid votes	551,722	99.60	+0.60
Invalid votes	2,224	0.40	−0.60
Votes cast / turnout	553,946	66.19	+5.83
Abstentions	282,945	33.81	−5.83
Registered voters	836,891		
Sources
Footnotes: ^{1} The Greens–Ecologist Confederation of Catalonia results are compared to Green Alternative–Ecologist Movement of Catalonia totals in the 1989 election.; ^{2} Nationalist Coalition (1994) results are compared to Nationalist Coalition (1989) totals in the 1989 election.; ^{3} Coalition for a New Socialist Party results are compared to Alliance for the Republic totals in the 1989 election.; ^{4} Andalusian Coalition–Andalusian Power results are compared to Andalusian Party totals in the 1989 election.; ^{5} GPOR–PST (LVS) Coalition results are compared to Workers' Socialist Party–Revolutionary Workers' Party totals in the 1989 election.; ^{6} For the Europe of the Peoples (1994) results are compared to For the Europe of the Peoples (1989) totals in the 1989 election.

=== Galicia ===
← Summary of the 12 June 1994 European Parliament election results in Galicia →
Parties and alliances	Popular vote		
Parties and alliances	Votes	%	±pp
People's Party (PP)	634,364	54.56	+21.08
Socialists' Party of Galicia (PSdeG–PSOE)	288,341	24.80	−8.25
Galician Nationalist Bloc (BNG)	132,507	11.40	+7.23
United Left (EU)	58,988	5.07	+3.08
Forum–Democratic and Social Centre (Foro–CDS)	6,841	0.59	−6.14
Ruiz-Mateos Group (Ruiz-Mateos)	5,051	0.43	−3.91
Galician Coalition (Nationalist Coalition) (CG)	4,384	0.38	−2.67
Green Group (GV)	3,649	0.31	New
Galician Alternative (AG)	1,741	0.15	New
Communist Party of the Peoples of Spain (PCPE)	1,617	0.14	−0.18
Hunting, Fishing, Nature, Tradition (CPNT)	1,142	0.10	New
Popular Unity (HB)	1,135	0.10	−0.41
Revolutionary Workers' Party (POR)	825	0.07	New
The Greens–Ecologist Confederation of Catalonia (EV–CEC)^{1}	816	0.07	−0.06
Coalition for a New Socialist Party (CNPS)^{2}	731	0.06	−0.16
Spanish Phalanx of the CNSO (FE–JONS)	531	0.05	−0.10
Regionalist Unity of Castile and León (URCL)	516	0.04	New
United Extremadura (EU)	503	0.04	New
Independent Spanish Phalanx (FEI)	428	0.04	New
Convergence and Union (CiU)	420	0.04	−0.08
Humanist Party (PH)	411	0.04	−0.12
Justice and Welfare Party (JyB)	399	0.03	New
Natural Law Party (PLN)	398	0.03	New
Asturianist Party (PAS)	388	0.03	New
For the Europe of the Peoples (PEP)	366	0.03	New
National Democratic Alternative (ADN)	364	0.03	New
Andalusian Coalition–Andalusian Power (PA–PAP)^{3}	347	0.03	−0.06
GPOR–PST (LVS) Coalition (GPOR–PST)^{4}	318	0.03	−0.33
Carlist Traditionalist Communion (CTC)	309	0.03	New
Carlist Party (PC)	301	0.03	−0.05
Regionalist Party of the Leonese Country (PREPAL)	276	0.02	New
Extremaduran Regionalist Party (PREx)	268	0.02	New
The Greens of the Region of Murcia (LVRM)	0	0.00	New
Blank ballots	14,121	1.21	−0.43
Total	1,162,796		
Valid votes	1,162,796	99.50	+0.64
Invalid votes	5,793	0.50	−0.64
Votes cast / turnout	1,168,589	50.25	+7.51
Abstentions	1,156,940	49.75	−7.51
Registered voters	2,325,529		
Sources
Footnotes: ^{1} The Greens–Ecologist Confederation of Catalonia results are compared to Green Alternative–Ecologist Movement of Catalonia totals in the 1989 election.; ^{2} Coalition for a New Socialist Party results are compared to Alliance for the Republic totals in the 1989 election.; ^{3} Andalusian Coalition–Andalusian Power results are compared to Andalusian Party totals in the 1989 election.; ^{4} GPOR–PST (LVS) Coalition results are compared to Workers' Socialist Party–Revolutionary Workers' Party totals in the 1989 election.

=== La Rioja ===
← Summary of the 12 June 1994 European Parliament election results in La Rioja →
Parties and alliances	Popular vote		
Parties and alliances	Votes	%	±pp
People's Party (PP)	69,520	53.12	+20.08
Spanish Socialist Workers' Party (PSOE)	39,430	30.13	−8.54
United Left (IU)	14,193	10.84	+7.17
Forum–Democratic and Social Centre (Foro–CDS)	1,838	1.40	−6.18
Green Group (GV)	926	0.71	New
Ruiz-Mateos Group (Ruiz-Mateos)	553	0.42	−3.99
Hunting, Fishing, Nature, Tradition (CPNT)	477	0.36	New
Popular Unity (HB)	246	0.19	−0.43
Nationalist Coalition (CN)^{1}	159	0.12	−0.01
Communist Party of the Peoples of Spain (PCPE)	150	0.11	−0.14
Spanish Phalanx of the CNSO (FE–JONS)	101	0.08	−0.07
The Greens–Ecologist Confederation of Catalonia (EV–CEC)^{2}	100	0.08	±0.00
Natural Law Party (PLN)	80	0.06	New
Carlist Party (PC)	80	0.06	−0.03
Revolutionary Workers' Party (POR)	67	0.05	New
Regionalist Unity of Castile and León (URCL)	57	0.04	New
Convergence and Union (CiU)	55	0.04	−0.07
Humanist Party (PH)	55	0.04	−0.08
Carlist Traditionalist Communion (CTC)	51	0.04	New
Independent Spanish Phalanx (FEI)	47	0.04	New
Coalition for a New Socialist Party (CNPS)^{3}	46	0.04	−0.12
Commoners' Land–Castilian Nationalist Party (PEP) (TC–PNC)	40	0.03	New
Justice and Welfare Party (JyB)	32	0.02	New
Galician Nationalist Bloc (BNG)	30	0.02	−0.03
Andalusian Coalition–Andalusian Power (PA–PAP)^{4}	29	0.02	−0.06
United Extremadura (EU)	27	0.02	New
National Democratic Alternative (ADN)	26	0.02	New
Asturianist Party (PAS)	22	0.02	New
Galician Alternative (AG)	22	0.02	New
Regionalist Party of the Leonese Country (PREPAL)	21	0.02	New
Extremaduran Regionalist Party (PREx)	20	0.02	New
GPOR–PST (LVS) Coalition (GPOR–PST)^{5}	18	0.01	−0.26
The Greens of the Region of Murcia (LVRM)	0	0.00	New
Blank ballots	2,363	1.81	−0.60
Total	130,881		
Valid votes	130,881	99.58	+0.99
Invalid votes	557	0.42	−0.99
Votes cast / turnout	131,438	60.80	+2.16
Abstentions	84,727	39.20	−2.16
Registered voters	216,165		
Sources
Footnotes: ^{1} Nationalist Coalition (1994) results are compared to Nationalist Coalition (1989) totals in the 1989 election.; ^{2} The Greens–Ecologist Confederation of Catalonia results are compared to Green Alternative–Ecologist Movement of Catalonia totals in the 1989 election.; ^{3} Coalition for a New Socialist Party results are compared to Alliance for the Republic totals in the 1989 election.; ^{4} Andalusian Coalition–Andalusian Power results are compared to Andalusian Party totals in the 1989 election.; ^{5} GPOR–PST (LVS) Coalition results are compared to Workers' Socialist Party–Revolutionary Workers' Party totals in the 1989 election.

=== Madrid ===
← Summary of the 12 June 1994 European Parliament election results in Madrid →
Parties and alliances	Popular vote		
Parties and alliances	Votes	%	±pp
People's Party (PP)	1,209,999	50.27	+22.29
Spanish Socialist Workers' Party (PSOE)	577,509	24.00	−11.47
United Left (IU)	470,613	19.55	+11.11
Forum–Democratic and Social Centre (Foro–CDS)	48,562	2.02	−7.30
Green Group (GV)	22,730	0.94	New
Ruiz-Mateos Group (Ruiz-Mateos)	18,354	0.76	−5.33
Nationalist Coalition (CN)^{1}	2,493	0.10	+0.03
Hunting, Fishing, Nature, Tradition (CPNT)	2,325	0.10	New
Communist Party of the Peoples of Spain (PCPE)	1,965	0.08	−0.13
Popular Unity (HB)	1,827	0.08	−0.25
United Extremadura (EU)	1,762	0.07	New
Revolutionary Workers' Party (POR)	1,706	0.07	New
Spanish Phalanx of the CNSO (FE–JONS)	1,672	0.07	−0.11
The Greens–Ecologist Confederation of Catalonia (EV–CEC)^{2}	1,605	0.07	±0.00
Convergence and Union (CiU)	1,484	0.06	−0.01
Humanist Party (PH)	1,173	0.05	−0.13
Galician Nationalist Bloc (BNG)	1,149	0.05	+0.01
Natural Law Party (PLN)	1,051	0.04	New
Independent Spanish Phalanx (FEI)	798	0.03	New
Regionalist Unity of Castile and León (URCL)	793	0.03	New
Andalusian Coalition–Andalusian Power (PA–PAP)^{3}	727	0.03	−0.28
Commoners' Land–Castilian Nationalist Party (PEP) (TC–PNC)	700	0.03	New
Asturianist Party (PAS)	689	0.03	New
Coalition for a New Socialist Party (CNPS)^{4}	686	0.03	−0.06
Extremaduran Regionalist Party (PREx)	597	0.02	New
National Democratic Alternative (ADN)	562	0.02	New
Justice and Welfare Party (JyB)	548	0.02	New
Regionalist Party of the Leonese Country (PREPAL)	455	0.02	New
Carlist Traditionalist Communion (CTC)	407	0.02	New
Carlist Party (PC)	296	0.01	−0.02
Galician Alternative (AG)	291	0.01	New
GPOR–PST (LVS) Coalition (GPOR–PST)^{5}	241	0.01	−0.16
The Greens of the Region of Murcia (LVRM)	0	0.00	New
Blank ballots	30,998	1.29	−0.37
Total	2,406,767		
Valid votes	2,406,767	99.70	+0.74
Invalid votes	7,315	0.30	−0.74
Votes cast / turnout	2,414,082	59.42	+0.94
Abstentions	1,648,618	40.58	−0.94
Registered voters	4,062,700		
Sources
Footnotes: ^{1} Nationalist Coalition (1994) results are compared to Nationalist Coalition (1989) totals in the 1989 election.; ^{2} The Greens–Ecologist Confederation of Catalonia results are compared to Green Alternative–Ecologist Movement of Catalonia totals in the 1989 election.; ^{3} Andalusian Coalition–Andalusian Power results are compared to Andalusian Party totals in the 1989 election.; ^{4} Coalition for a New Socialist Party results are compared to Alliance for the Republic totals in the 1989 election.; ^{5} GPOR–PST (LVS) Coalition results are compared to Workers' Socialist Party–Revolutionary Workers' Party totals in the 1989 election.

=== Murcia ===
← Summary of the 12 June 1994 European Parliament election results in Murcia →
Parties and alliances	Popular vote		
Parties and alliances	Votes	%	±pp
People's Party (PP)	287,135	52.21	+25.47
Spanish Socialist Workers' Party (PSOE)	170,300	30.97	−17.21
United Left (IU)	71,931	13.08	+7.05
Forum–Democratic and Social Centre (Foro–CDS)	6,392	1.16	−8.16
Green Group (GV)	3,002	0.55	New
Ruiz-Mateos Group (Ruiz-Mateos)	1,458	0.27	−2.66
Hunting, Fishing, Nature, Tradition (CPNT)	717	0.13	New
Communist Party of the Peoples of Spain (PCPE)	704	0.13	−0.40
Revolutionary Workers' Party (POR)	480	0.09	New
The Greens–Ecologist Confederation of Catalonia (EV–CEC)^{1}	462	0.08	±0.00
Convergence and Union (CiU)	373	0.07	±0.00
Spanish Phalanx of the CNSO (FE–JONS)	306	0.06	−0.07
Natural Law Party (PLN)	266	0.05	New
Popular Unity (HB)	207	0.04	−0.12
Regionalist Unity of Castile and León (URCL)	187	0.03	New
Humanist Party (PH)	184	0.03	−0.12
Independent Spanish Phalanx (FEI)	181	0.03	New
Coalition for a New Socialist Party (CNPS)^{2}	143	0.03	−0.07
Justice and Welfare Party (JyB)	137	0.02	New
Nationalist Coalition (CN)^{3}	121	0.02	−0.03
For the Europe of the Peoples (PEP)^{4}	119	0.02	−0.03
Galician Nationalist Bloc (BNG)	116	0.02	−0.02
Andalusian Coalition–Andalusian Power (PA–PAP)^{5}	107	0.02	−0.08
Asturianist Party (PAS)	96	0.02	New
Carlist Party (PC)	92	0.02	−0.01
National Democratic Alternative (ADN)	90	0.02	New
Galician Alternative (AG)	81	0.01	New
United Extremadura (EU)	81	0.01	New
Regionalist Party of the Leonese Country (PREPAL)	78	0.01	New
Carlist Traditionalist Communion (CTC)	67	0.01	New
Extremaduran Regionalist Party (PREx)	65	0.01	New
GPOR–PST (LVS) Coalition (GPOR–PST)^{6}	58	0.01	−0.21
The Greens of the Region of Murcia (LVRM)	0	0.00	New
Blank ballots	4,217	0.77	+0.01
Total	549,953		
Valid votes	549,953	99.65	+0.44
Invalid votes	1,946	0.35	−0.44
Votes cast / turnout	551,899	66.55	+7.84
Abstentions	277,446	33.45	−7.84
Registered voters	829,345		
Sources
Footnotes: ^{1} The Greens–Ecologist Confederation of Catalonia results are compared to Green Alternative–Ecologist Movement of Catalonia totals in the 1989 election.; ^{2} Coalition for a New Socialist Party results are compared to Alliance for the Republic totals in the 1989 election.; ^{3} Nationalist Coalition (1994) results are compared to Nationalist Coalition (1989) totals in the 1989 election.; ^{4} For the Europe of the Peoples (1994) results are compared to For the Europe of the Peoples (1989) totals in the 1989 election.; ^{5} Andalusian Coalition–Andalusian Power results are compared to Andalusian Party totals in the 1989 election.; ^{6} GPOR–PST (LVS) Coalition results are compared to Workers' Socialist Party–Revolutionary Workers' Party totals in the 1989 election.

=== Navarre ===
← Summary of the 12 June 1994 European Parliament election results in Navarre →
Parties and alliances	Popular vote		
Parties and alliances	Votes	%	±pp
People's Party (PP)	94,005	40.83	+13.68
Spanish Socialist Workers' Party (PSOE)^{1}	57,102	24.80	−7.53
United Left of Navarre (IU/EB)	29,393	12.77	+9.63
Popular Unity (HB)	24,016	10.43	−3.32
Basque Solidarity (For the Europe of the Peoples) (EA)	8,607	3.74	−2.49
Basque Nationalist Party (Nationalist Coalition) (EAJ/PNV)	2,835	1.23	+0.18
Green Group (GV)	2,014	0.87	New
Forum–Democratic and Social Centre (Foro–CDS)	2,005	0.87	−4.52
Hunting, Fishing, Nature, Tradition (CPNT)	1,632	0.71	New
Ruiz-Mateos Group (Ruiz-Mateos)	1,326	0.58	−2.36
Carlist Party (PC)	583	0.25	−0.29
Carlist Traditionalist Communion (CTC)	473	0.21	New
The Greens–Ecologist Confederation of Catalonia (EV–CEC)^{2}	375	0.16	+0.05
Spanish Phalanx of the CNSO (FE–JONS)	299	0.13	+0.04
Communist Party of the Peoples of Spain (PCPE)	292	0.13	−0.06
Natural Law Party (PLN)	155	0.07	New
Convergence and Union (CiU)	141	0.06	−0.02
Revolutionary Workers' Party (LIA)	102	0.04	New
United Extremadura (EU)	98	0.04	New
Humanist Party (PH)	92	0.04	−0.06
Justice and Welfare Party (JyB)	92	0.04	New
Asturianist Party (PAS)	79	0.03	New
Galician Nationalist Bloc (BNG)	79	0.03	+0.02
Coalition for a New Socialist Party (CNPS)^{3}	61	0.03	−0.06
Andalusian Coalition–Andalusian Power (PA–PAP)^{4}	54	0.02	−0.04
Regionalist Unity of Castile and León (URCL)	50	0.02	New
Extremaduran Regionalist Party (PREx)	46	0.02	New
National Democratic Alternative (ADN)	46	0.02	New
GPOR–PST (LVS) Coalition (GPOR–PST)^{5}	38	0.02	−0.22
Independent Spanish Phalanx (FEI)	32	0.01	New
Galician Alternative (AG)	30	0.01	New
Regionalist Party of the Leonese Country (PREPAL)	28	0.01	New
The Greens of the Region of Murcia (LVRM)	0	0.00	New
Blank ballots	4,076	1.77	−0.04
Total	230,256		
Valid votes	230,256	99.42	+0.72
Invalid votes	1,351	0.58	−0.72
Votes cast / turnout	231,607	53.61	−3.73
Abstentions	200,449	46.39	+3.73
Registered voters	432,056		
Sources
Footnotes: ^{1} Spanish Socialist Workers' Party results are compared to the combined totals of Spanish Socialist Workers' Party and Basque Country Left in the 1989 election.; ^{2} The Greens–Ecologist Confederation of Catalonia results are compared to Green Alternative–Ecologist Movement of Catalonia totals in the 1989 election.; ^{3} Coalition for a New Socialist Party results are compared to Alliance for the Republic totals in the 1989 election.; ^{4} Andalusian Coalition–Andalusian Power results are compared to Andalusian Party totals in the 1989 election.; ^{5} GPOR–PST (LVS) Coalition results are compared to Workers' Socialist Party–Revolutionary Workers' Party totals in the 1989 election.

=== Valencian Community ===
← Summary of the 12 June 1994 European Parliament election results in the Valencian Community →
Parties and alliances	Popular vote		
Parties and alliances	Votes	%	±pp
People's Party (PP)	882,448	44.19	+21.44
Spanish Socialist Workers' Party (PSOE)	608,897	30.49	−12.18
United Left of the Valencian Country (EUPV)	277,999	13.92	+8.01
Valencian Union (Nationalist Coalition) (UV)	105,389	5.28	−1.51
Valencian People's Union–Convergence and Union (UPV–CiU)^{1}	35,703	1.79	−0.88
Forum–Democratic and Social Centre (Foro–CDS)	18,522	0.93	−6.56
Green Group (GV)	13,284	0.67	New
Ruiz-Mateos Group (Ruiz-Mateos)	10,463	0.52	−2.64
The Greens–Ecologist Confederation of Catalonia (EV–CEC)^{2}	4,723	0.24	+0.10
Communist Party of the Peoples of Spain (PCPE)	3,482	0.17	−0.25
Republican Left of Catalonia–Catalan Action (PEP) (ERC–AC)	2,482	0.12	New
Hunting, Fishing, Nature, Tradition (CPNT)	2,402	0.12	New
Revolutionary Workers' Party (POR)	1,965	0.10	New
Popular Unity (HB)	1,680	0.08	−0.24
Spanish Phalanx of the CNSO (FE–JONS)	1,247	0.06	−0.11
United Extremadura (EU)	799	0.04	New
Natural Law Party (PLN)	777	0.04	New
Carlist Traditionalist Communion (CTC)	739	0.04	New
Coalition for a New Socialist Party (CNPS)^{3}	643	0.03	−0.07
Humanist Party (PH)	604	0.03	−0.06
Independent Spanish Phalanx (FEI)	591	0.03	New
Regionalist Unity of Castile and León (URCL)	518	0.03	New
Justice and Welfare Party (JyB)	453	0.02	New
National Democratic Alternative (ADN)	452	0.02	New
Andalusian Coalition–Andalusian Power (PA–PAP)^{4}	451	0.02	−0.14
Carlist Party (PC)	434	0.02	−0.02
Galician Nationalist Bloc (BNG)	388	0.02	−0.02
GPOR–PST (LVS) Coalition (GPOR–PST)^{5}	334	0.02	−0.21
Asturianist Party (PAS)	312	0.02	New
Extremaduran Regionalist Party (PREx)	303	0.02	New
Galician Alternative (AG)	276	0.01	New
Regionalist Party of the Leonese Country (PREPAL)	275	0.01	New
The Greens of the Region of Murcia (LVRM)	0	0.00	New
Blank ballots	17,999	0.90	−0.22
Total	1,997,034		
Valid votes	1,997,034	99.63	+0.67
Invalid votes	7,348	0.37	−0.67
Votes cast / turnout	2,004,382	64.98	+3.29
Abstentions	1,080,110	35.02	−3.29
Registered voters	3,084,492		
Sources
Footnotes: ^{1} Valencian People's Union–Convergence and Union results are compared to the combined totals of Valencian People's Union and Convergence and Union in the 1989 election.; ^{2} The Greens–Ecologist Confederation of Catalonia results are compared to Green Alternative–Ecologist Movement of Catalonia totals in the 1989 election.; ^{3} Coalition for a New Socialist Party results are compared to Alliance for the Republic totals in the 1989 election.; ^{4} Andalusian Coalition–Andalusian Power results are compared to Andalusian Party totals in the 1989 election.; ^{5} GPOR–PST (LVS) Coalition results are compared to Workers' Socialist Party–Revolutionary Workers' Party totals in the 1989 election.

== Autonomous cities ==
=== Ceuta ===
← Summary of the 12 June 1994 European Parliament election results in Ceuta →
Parties and alliances	Popular vote		
Parties and alliances	Votes	%	±pp
People's Party (PP)	12,094	60.27	+27.63
Spanish Socialist Workers' Party (PSOE)	6,183	30.81	−9.10
United Left (IU)	857	4.27	+2.75
Forum–Democratic and Social Centre (Foro–CDS)	145	0.72	−8.45
Green Group (GV)	127	0.63	New
Ruiz-Mateos Group (Ruiz-Mateos)	59	0.29	−6.08
Hunting, Fishing, Nature, Tradition (CPNT)	50	0.25	New
Andalusian Coalition–Andalusian Power (PA–PAP)^{1}	42	0.21	−1.81
The Greens–Ecologist Confederation of Catalonia (EV–CEC)^{2}	28	0.14	−0.04
Spanish Phalanx of the CNSO (FE–JONS)	24	0.12	−0.16
Communist Party of the Peoples of Spain (PCPE)	21	0.10	−0.11
Coalition for a New Socialist Party (CNPS)^{3}	18	0.09	−0.07
Convergence and Union (CiU)	17	0.08	+0.03
Revolutionary Workers' Party (POR)	15	0.07	New
Humanist Party (PH)	12	0.06	±0.00
Regionalist Party of the Leonese Country (PREPAL)	12	0.06	New
Independent Spanish Phalanx (FEI)	12	0.06	New
Justice and Welfare Party (JyB)	11	0.05	New
Extremaduran Regionalist Party (PREx)	10	0.05	New
Asturianist Party (PAS)	10	0.05	New
Natural Law Party (PLN)	9	0.04	New
Carlist Traditionalist Communion (CTC)	8	0.04	New
Carlist Party (PC)	7	0.03	−0.07
Galician Nationalist Bloc (BNG)	7	0.03	−0.02
Galician Alternative (AG)	7	0.03	New
Nationalist Coalition (CN)^{4}	6	0.03	−0.03
GPOR–PST (LVS) Coalition (GPOR–PST)^{5}	6	0.03	−0.32
Regionalist Unity of Castile and León (URCL)	5	0.02	New
United Extremadura (EU)	5	0.02	New
National Democratic Alternative (ADN)	3	0.01	New
For the Europe of the Peoples (PEP)^{6}	3	0.01	−0.05
The Greens of the Region of Murcia (LVRM)	0	0.00	New
Blank ballots	253	1.26	−0.17
Total	20,066		
Valid votes	20,066	98.88	+0.36
Invalid votes	228	1.12	−0.36
Votes cast / turnout	20,294	40.44	+0.67
Abstentions	29,892	59.56	−0.67
Registered voters	50,186		
Sources
Footnotes: ^{1} Andalusian Coalition–Andalusian Power results are compared to Andalusian Party totals in the 1989 election.; ^{2} The Greens–Ecologist Confederation of Catalonia results are compared to Green Alternative–Ecologist Movement of Catalonia totals in the 1989 election.; ^{3} Coalition for a New Socialist Party results are compared to Alliance for the Republic totals in the 1989 election.; ^{4} Nationalist Coalition (1994) results are compared to Nationalist Coalition (1989) totals in the 1989 election.; ^{5} GPOR–PST (LVS) Coalition results are compared to Workers' Socialist Party–Revolutionary Workers' Party totals in the 1989 election.; ^{6} For the Europe of the Peoples (1994) results are compared to For the Europe of the Peoples (1989) totals in the 1989 election.

=== Melilla ===
← Summary of the 12 June 1994 European Parliament election results in Melilla →
Parties and alliances	Popular vote		
Parties and alliances	Votes	%	±pp
People's Party (PP)	9,134	49.02	+19.55
Spanish Socialist Workers' Party (PSOE)	7,721	41.44	−0.77
United Left (IU)	900	4.83	+2.71
Forum–Democratic and Social Centre (Foro–CDS)	185	0.99	−8.04
Green Group (GV)	96	0.52	New
Ruiz-Mateos Group (Ruiz-Mateos)	60	0.32	−2.88
Andalusian Coalition–Andalusian Power (PA–PAP)^{1}	40	0.21	−1.21
Communist Party of the Peoples of Spain (PCPE)	20	0.11	−0.18
Spanish Phalanx of the CNSO (FE–JONS)	18	0.10	−0.05
United Extremadura (EU)	16	0.09	New
Justice and Welfare Party (JyB)	16	0.09	New
Galician Nationalist Bloc (BNG)	15	0.08	+0.05
Revolutionary Workers' Party (POR)	15	0.08	New
Hunting, Fishing, Nature, Tradition (CPNT)	15	0.08	New
Humanist Party (PH)	14	0.08	−0.01
The Greens–Ecologist Confederation of Catalonia (EV–CEC)^{2}	14	0.08	−0.04
Natural Law Party (PLN)	12	0.06	New
Independent Spanish Phalanx (FEI)	12	0.06	New
National Democratic Alternative (ADN)	12	0.06	New
Asturianist Party (PAS)	9	0.05	New
Coalition for a New Socialist Party (CNPS)^{3}	8	0.04	−0.06
Regionalist Party of the Leonese Country (PREPAL)	8	0.04	New
Convergence and Union (CiU)	7	0.04	−0.06
GPOR–PST (LVS) Coalition (GPOR–PST)^{4}	7	0.04	−0.07
Nationalist Coalition (CN)^{5}	7	0.04	−0.06
Carlist Party (PC)	6	0.03	−0.04
Regionalist Unity of Castile and León (URCL)	6	0.03	New
For the Europe of the Peoples (PEP)^{6}	6	0.03	−0.01
Extremaduran Regionalist Party (PREx)	5	0.03	New
Galician Alternative (AG)	5	0.03	New
Carlist Traditionalist Communion (CTC)	4	0.02	New
The Greens of the Region of Murcia (LVRM)	0	0.00	New
Blank ballots	239	1.28	−0.01
Total	18,632		
Valid votes	18,632	99.62	+1.01
Invalid votes	71	0.38	−1.01
Votes cast / turnout	18,703	45.12	+5.23
Abstentions	22,748	54.88	−5.23
Registered voters	41,451		
Sources
Footnotes: ^{1} Andalusian Coalition–Andalusian Power results are compared to Andalusian Party totals in the 1989 election.; ^{2} The Greens–Ecologist Confederation of Catalonia results are compared to Green Alternative–Ecologist Movement of Catalonia totals in the 1989 election.; ^{3} Coalition for a New Socialist Party results are compared to Alliance for the Republic totals in the 1989 election.; ^{4} GPOR–PST (LVS) Coalition results are compared to Workers' Socialist Party–Revolutionary Workers' Party totals in the 1989 election.; ^{5} Nationalist Coalition (1994) results are compared to Nationalist Coalition (1989) totals in the 1989 election.; ^{6} For the Europe of the Peoples (1994) results are compared to For the Europe of the Peoples (1989) totals in the 1989 election.

== Congress of Deputies projection ==
A projection of European Parliament election results using electoral rules for the Congress of Deputies would have given the following seat allocation, as distributed per constituencies and regions: (Note: Note that results are compared with party totals in the preceding general election—held in June 1993—for consistency.)

Summary of the 12 June 1994 Congress of Deputies projected election results
Parties and alliances	Popular vote			Seats	
Parties and alliances	Votes	%	±pp	Total	+/−
People's Party (PP)	7,453,900	40.12	+5.36	169	+28
Spanish Socialist Workers' Party (PSOE)	5,719,707	30.79	−7.99	116	−43
United Left (IU)	2,497,671	13.44	+3.89	30	+12
Convergence and Union (CiU)	806,610	4.34	−0.60	19	+2
Basque Nationalist Party (EAJ/PNV)	236,461	1.27	+0.03	5	±0
Popular Unity (HB)	164,875	0.89	+0.01	3	+1
Republican Left of Catalonia–Catalan Action (ERC–AC)	146,351	0.79	−0.01	1	±0
Galician Nationalist Bloc (BNG)	132,507	0.71	+0.17	2	+2
Canarian Coalition (CC)	113,677	0.61	−0.27	3	−1
Valencian Union (UV)	105,389	0.57	+0.09	1	±0
Basque Solidarity (EA)	87,025	0.47	−0.08	1	±0
Aragonese Party (PAR)	44,132	0.24	−0.37	0	−1
Others	856,489	4.61	—	0	±0
Blank ballots	213,621	1.15	+0.35		
Total	18,578,415			350	±0

=== Constituencies ===

Summary of constituency results in the 12 June 1994 European Parliament election in Spain
Constituency	PP		PSOE		IU		CiU		PNV		HB		ERC–AC		BNG		CC		UV		EA	
Constituency	%	S	%	S	%	S	%	S	%	S	%	S	%	S	%	S	%	S	%	S	%	S
La Coruña	51.9	5	25.7	3	5.9	−									11.9	1						
Álava	27.4	2	19.7	1	12.3	−			18.9	1	9.6	−									5.9	−
Albacete	45.2	2	38.5	2	12.4	−																
Alicante	47.1	5	32.1	4	13.6	1							0.1	−					1.4	−		
Almería	42.0	3	39.9	2	13.1	−																
Asturias	42.6	4	32.1	3	19.5	2																
Ávila	58.2	2	26.4	1	8.3	−																
Badajoz	39.3	3	45.6	3	11.8	−																
Balearics	50.6	5	24.8	2	9.9	−							0.8	−								
Barcelona	18.7	6	28.9	10	12.5	4	29.5	11					5.0	1								
Biscay	17.6	2	18.4	2	10.0	1			30.9	3	12.9	1									6.0	−
Burgos	55.3	3	24.2	1	12.7	−																
Cáceres	41.7	2	44.1	3	8.9	−																
Cádiz	34.4	4	37.5	4	16.7	1																
Cantabria	49.5	3	32.2	2	12.3	−																
Castellón	47.2	3	32.8	2	9.1	−							0.2	−					3.6	−		
Ceuta	60.3	1	30.8	−	4.3	−																
Ciudad Real	45.1	3	41.2	2	10.4	−																
Córdoba	31.6	2	39.6	3	22.2	2																
Cuenca	51.7	2	37.9	1	7.2	−																
Gipuzkoa	13.3	1	17.5	1	7.7	−			19.4	1	22.9	2									14.7	1
Girona	12.6	1	25.0	1	5.5	−	43.5	3					8.1	−								
Granada	38.9	3	40.4	3	14.9	1																
Guadalajara	53.5	2	28.9	1	12.3	−																
Huelva	33.7	2	46.0	3	13.6	−																
Huesca	41.6	2	34.4	1	10.0	−							0.1	−								
Jaén	36.4	2	44.4	3	14.3	1																
La Rioja	53.1	3	30.1	1	10.8	−																
Las Palmas	50.7	4	20.3	2	9.0	−											16.2	1				
León	51.3	3	33.0	2	10.5	−																
Lleida	19.9	1	23.8	1	5.2	−	39.1	2					7.5	−								
Lugo	61.2	4	22.9	1	3.5	−									9.1	−						
Madrid	50.3	19	24.0	8	19.6	7																
Málaga	37.0	4	36.7	4	19.6	2																
Melilla	49.0	1	41.4	−	4.8	−																
Murcia	52.2	5	31.0	3	13.1	1																
Navarre	40.8	3	24.8	1	12.8	1			1.2	−	10.4	−									3.7	−
Orense	56.3	3	27.2	1	2.7	−									10.4	−						
Palencia	53.3	2	30.3	1	9.6	−																
Pontevedra	54.0	5	23.5	2	5.9	−									12.3	1						
Salamanca	54.1	3	30.5	1	9.6	−																
Santa Cruz de Tenerife	36.1	3	30.0	2	7.6	−											22.0	2				
Segovia	55.8	2	25.4	1	10.4	−																
Seville	30.8	4	44.7	6	17.2	2																
Soria	57.6	2	27.9	1	9.1	−																
Tarragona	20.9	1	27.8	2	7.7	−	32.1	3					6.5	−								
Teruel	46.3	2	35.0	1	7.2	−							0.0	−								
Toledo	49.1	3	37.2	2	10.1	−																
Valencia	41.9	8	29.1	5	15.1	2							0.1	−					7.8	1		
Valladolid	51.2	3	27.1	1	15.1	1																
Zamora	55.4	2	31.9	1	6.9	−																
Zaragoza	45.5	4	26.2	2	15.8	1							0.0	−								
Total	40.1	169	30.8	116	13.4	30	4.3	19	1.3	5	0.9	3	0.8	1	0.7	2	0.6	3	0.6	1	0.5	1

=== Regions ===

Summary of regional results in the 12 June 1994 European Parliament election in Spain
Region	PP		PSOE		IU		CiU		PNV		HB		ERC		BNG		CC		UV		EA	
Region	%	S	%	S	%	S	%	S	%	S	%	S	%	S	%	S	%	S	%	S	%	S
Andalusia	34.8	24	41.1	28	17.0	9																
Aragon	44.9	8	28.7	4	13.7	1							0.0	−								
Asturias	42.6	4	32.1	3	19.5	2																
Balearics	50.6	5	24.8	2	9.9	−							0.8	−								
Basque Country	17.5	5	18.3	4	9.6	1			25.9	5	15.6	3									8.7	1
Canary Islands	43.9	7	24.8	4	8.3	−											18.8	3				
Cantabria	49.5	3	32.2	2	12.3	−																
Castile and León	53.7	22	28.8	10	11.0	1																
Castilla–La Mancha	47.9	12	37.9	8	10.5	−																
Catalonia	18.5	9	28.2	14	11.1	4	31.5	19					5.5	1								
Ceuta	60.3	1	30.8	−	4.3	−																
Extremadura	40.2	5	45.0	6	10.7	−																
Galicia	54.6	17	24.8	7	5.1	−									11.4	2						
La Rioja	53.1	3	30.1	1	10.8	−																
Madrid	50.3	19	24.0	8	19.6	7																
Melilla	49.0	1	41.4	−	4.8	−																
Murcia	52.2	5	31.0	3	13.1	1																
Navarre	40.8	3	24.8	1	12.8	1			1.2	−	10.4	−									3.7	−
Valencian Community	44.2	16	30.5	11	13.9	3							0.1	−					5.3	1		
Total	40.1	169	30.8	116	13.4	30	4.3	19	1.3	5	0.9	3	0.8	1	0.7	2	0.6	3	0.6	1	0.5	1
