= Seville (Parliament of Andalusia constituency) =

Coordinates: 37°30′N 5°30′W

- Parliament of Andalusia; Electoral constituency
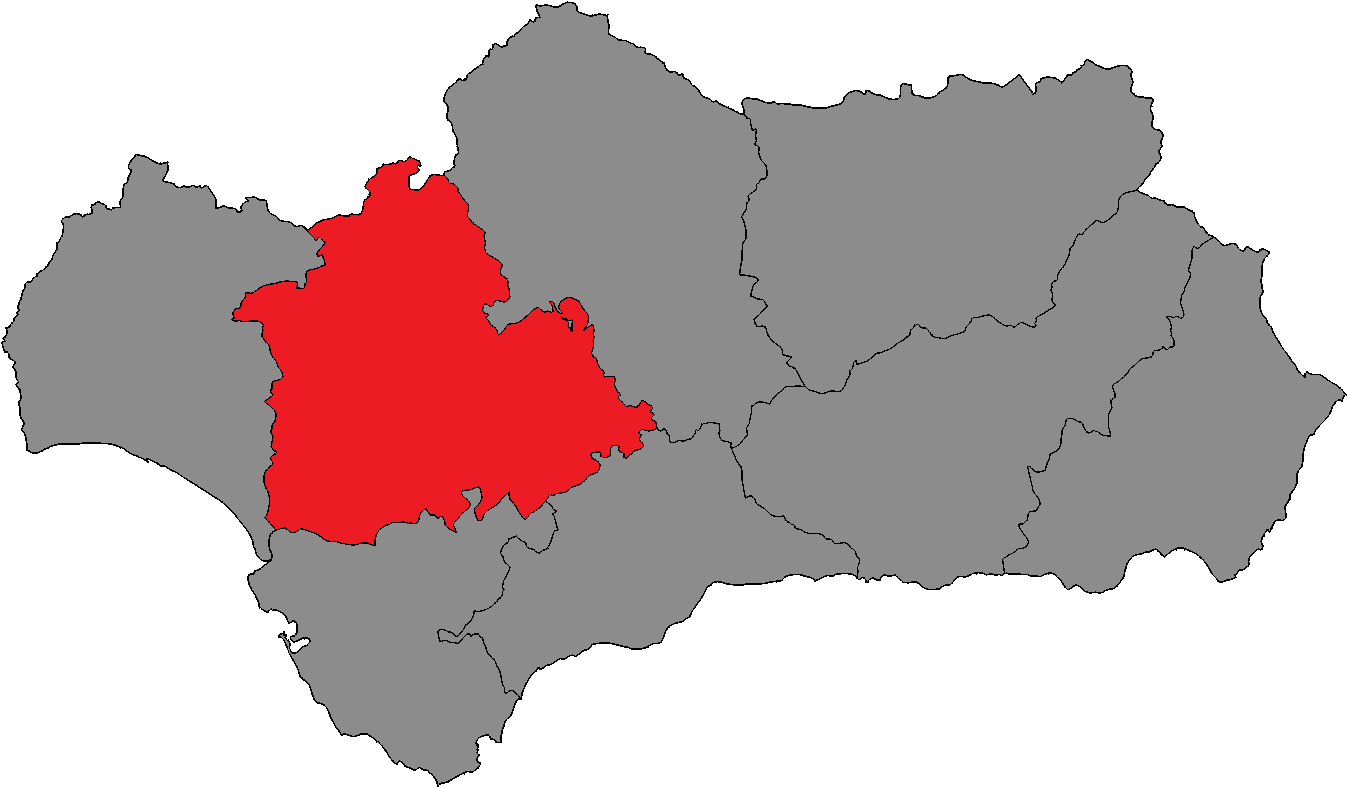
- Location of Seville within Andalusia
- Province: Seville
- Autonomous community: Andalusia
- Population: ▲1,976,624 (2025)
- Electorate: ▲1,598,181 (2026)
- Major settlements: Seville, Dos Hermanas, Alcalá de Guadaíra, Utrera, Écija

Current constituency
- Created: 1982
- Seats: 18 (1982–1996); 19 (1996–2000); 18 (2000–present)
- Members: PP (8); PSOE–A (5); AA (2); Vox (2); PorA (1)

Seville (Spanish: Sevilla) is one of the eight constituencies (Spanish: circunscripciones) represented in the Parliament of Andalusia, the regional legislature of the Autonomous Community of Andalusia. The constituency currently elects 18 deputies. Its boundaries correspond to those of the Spanish province of Seville. The electoral system uses the D'Hondt method and closed-list proportional representation, with a minimum threshold of three percent.

== Electoral system ==
The constituency was established under the Statute of Autonomy for Andalusia of 1981 and was first contested in the 1982 regional election. The Statute (reformed in 2007) provides for the eight provinces in Andalusia—Almería, Cádiz, Córdoba, Granada, Huelva, Jaén, Málaga and Seville—to be set as multi-member constituencies in the Parliament of Andalusia, each of which is assigned an initial minimum of eight seats and the remaining ones are distributed in proportion to population (with the number of seats in each province not exceeding two times that of any other). The exception was the 1982 election, when each constituency was allocated a fixed number of seats. Seats are elected using the D'Hondt method and closed-list proportional voting, with a three percent-threshold of valid votes (including blank ballots) in each constituency. The use of this electoral method may result in a higher effective threshold depending on district magnitude and vote distribution. The law does not provide for by-elections to fill vacant seats; instead, any vacancies arising after the proclamation of candidates and during the legislative term are filled by the next candidates on the party lists or, when required, by designated substitutes.

Voting is based on universal suffrage, comprising all Spanish nationals over 18 years of age, registered in the constituency and with full political rights. Amendments in 2011 required non-resident citizens to apply for voting, a system known as "begged" voting (Spanish: Voto rogado), which was abolished in 2022 and attributed responsibility for a major decrease in the turnout of Spaniards abroad during the years it was in force. Additionally, those legally incapacitated were also barred from voting before amendments in 2018 granted them the right to vote.

The electoral law allows for parties and federations registered in the interior ministry, alliances and groupings of electors to present lists of candidates. Parties and federations intending to form an alliance are required to inform the relevant electoral commission within 10 days of the election call—15 before 1985—whereas groupings of electors need to secure the signature of at least one percent of the electorate in the constituencies for which they seek election (before 1985 this was one permille, with a compulsory minimum of 500 signatures), disallowing electors from signing for more than one list. Amendments in 2005 required a balanced composition of men and women in the electoral lists through the use of a zipper system.

== Deputies ==
Deputies 1982–present
Key to parties PCA–PCE IU–CA IULV–CA Adelante AA PorA Podemos PA PSOE–A Cs UCD PP CP AP Vox
Parliament	Election	Distribution
1st	1982	2 / 1 / 11 / 1 / 3
2nd	1986	3 / 1 / 10 / 4
3rd	1990	2 / 2 / 10 / 4
4th	1994	3 / 1 / 8 / 6
5th	1996	2 / 1 / 10 / 6
6th	2000	1 / 1 / 10 / 6
7th	2004	1 / 1 / 11 / 5
8th	2008	1 / 11 / 6
9th	2012	2 / 9 / 7
10th	2015	1 / 3 / 8 / 2 / 4
11th	2018	4 / 6 / 3 / 3 / 2
12th	2022	1 / 1 / 5 / 9 / 2
13th	2026	2 / 1 / 5 / 8 / 2

== Regional elections ==
=== 2026 ===
Summary of the 17 May 2026 Parliament of Andalusia election results in Seville
Parties and alliances	Popular vote			Seats	
Parties and alliances	Votes	%	±pp	Total	+/−
People's Party (PP)	411,730	39.38	−0.72	8	−1
Spanish Socialist Workers' Party of Andalusia (PSOE–A)	250,448	23.95	−2.66	5	±0
Forward Andalusia (Adelante Andalucía)	134,654	12.88	+6.61	2	+1
Vox (Vox)	112,691	10.78	−0.65	2	±0
For Andalusia (IU–Podemos–MS–IdPA–VQ–ALTER–AV)	78,097	7.47	−0.89	1	±0
The Party is Over (SALF)	27,343	2.62	New	0	±0
Animalist Party with the Environment (PACMA)^{1}	6,809	0.65	−0.34	0	±0
Andalusians–Andalusian People–Forum of Montellano (Andalucistas–PA)^{2}	2,917	0.28	−0.23	0	±0
Blank Seats to Leave Empty Seats (EB)	2,346	0.22	+0.11	0	±0
Spanish Phalanx of the CNSO (FE de las JONS)	1,411	0.13	+0.07	0	±0
Self-employed Party (Partido Autónomos)	1,329	0.13	+0.05	0	±0
For a Fairer World (M+J)	1,161	0.11	+0.04	0	±0
Andalusian Power (Poder Andaluz)	1,084	0.10	New	0	±0
Communist Party of the Andalusian People (PCPA)	1,051	0.10	−0.01	0	±0
Communist Party of the Workers of Spain (PCTE)	770	0.07	−0.02	0	±0
Andalusian Nation (NA)	708	0.07	±0.00	0	±0
Blank ballots	11,062	1.06	+0.01		
Total	1,045,611			18	±0
Valid votes	1,045,611	98.83	+0.05		
Invalid votes	12,349	1.17	−0.05		
Votes cast / turnout	1,057,960	66.20	+6.68		
Abstentions	540,217	33.80	−6.68		
Registered voters	1,598,177				
Sources
Footnotes: ^{1} Animalist Party with the Environment results are compared to Animalist Party Against Mistreatment of Animals totals in the 2022 election.; ^{2} Andalusians–Andalusian People–Forum of Montellano results are compared to Arise Andalusians Coalition in the 2022 election.

=== 2022 ===
Summary of the 19 June 2022 Parliament of Andalusia election results in Seville
Parties and alliances	Popular vote			Seats	
Parties and alliances	Votes	%	±pp	Total	+/−
People's Party (PP)	367,561	40.10	+23.59	9	+6
Spanish Socialist Workers' Party of Andalusia (PSOE–A)	243,885	26.61	–3.35	5	–1
Vox (Vox)	104,759	11.43	+0.71	2	±0
United Left–More Country–Greens Equo–Initiative: For Andalusia (PorA)^{1}	76,603	8.36	n/a	1	±0
Forward Andalusia–Andalusians (Adelante Andalucía–Andalucistas)^{1}	57,431	6.27	n/a	1	–2
Citizens–Party of the Citizenry (Cs)	35,001	3.82	–13.96	0	–3
Animalist Party Against Mistreatment of Animals (PACMA)	9,035	0.99	–1.09	0	±0
Arise Andalusians Coalition (AL)^{2}	4,705	0.51	–0.13	0	±0
The Greens (Los Verdes)	1,457	0.16	New	0	±0
Blank Seats (EB)	1,006	0.11	New	0	±0
Communist Party of the Andalusian People (PCPA)	985	0.11	–0.03	0	±0
Communist Party of the Workers of Spain (PCTE)	860	0.09	New	0	±0
Self-employed Party (Partido Autónomos)	706	0.08	New	0	±0
For a Fairer World (PUM+J)	636	0.07	New	0	±0
Andalusian Nation (NA)	623	0.07	–0.09	0	±0
Spanish Phalanx of the CNSO (FE de las JONS)	569	0.06	–0.02	0	±0
Zero Cuts (Recortes Cero)	483	0.05	–0.17	0	±0
We Are Future (Somos Futuro)	266	0.03	New	0	±0
Wake Up–Constitutionalist Sociopolitical Party (Despierta)	261	0.03	New	0	±0
Blank ballots	9,665	1.05	–0.75		
Total	916,497			18	±0
Valid votes	916,497	98.78	+1.14		
Invalid votes	11,341	1.22	–1.14		
Votes cast / turnout	927,838	59.52	+0.28		
Abstentions	630,943	40.48	–0.28		
Registered voters	1,558,781				
Sources
Footnotes: ^{1} Within the Forward–We Can–United Left–Spring–Andalusian Left alliance in the 2018 election.; ^{2} Arise Andalusians Coalition results are compared to Andalusia by Herself totals in the 2018 election.

=== 2018 ===
Summary of the 2 December 2018 Parliament of Andalusia election results in Seville
Parties and alliances	Popular vote			Seats	
Parties and alliances	Votes	%	±pp	Total	+/−
Spanish Socialist Workers' Party of Andalusia (PSOE–A)	266,875	29.96	–8.11	6	–2
Forward–We Can–United Left–Spring–Andalusian Left (Adelante Andalucía)^{1}	168,290	18.89	–4.73	4	±0
Citizens–Party of the Citizenry (Cs)	158,345	17.78	+8.63	3	+1
People's Party (PP)	147,078	16.51	–5.44	3	–1
Vox (Vox)	95,512	10.72	+9.92	2	+2
Animalist Party Against Mistreatment of Animals (PACMA)	18,508	2.08	+1.30	0	±0
Andalusia by Herself (AxSí)^{2}	5,680	0.64	–1.02	0	±0
Equo Greens–Andalusia Initiative (Equo–Iniciativa)	4,278	0.48	New	0	±0
Spanish Communist Workers' Party (PCOE)	2,133	0.24	New	0	±0
Zero Cuts–For a Fairer World–Green Group (Recortes Cero–M+J–GV)^{3}	1,928	0.22	+0.13	0	±0
Union, Progress and Democracy (UPyD)	1,900	0.21	–1.65	0	±0
Andalusian Nation (NA)	1,421	0.16	New	0	±0
Communist Party of the Andalusian People (PCPA)	1,203	0.14	+0.08	0	±0
Republican Alternative (ALTER)	930	0.10	New	0	±0
Spanish Phalanx of the CNSO (FE de las JONS)	672	0.08	–0.02	0	±0
Blank ballots	16,037	1.80	+0.43		
Total	890,790			18	±0
Valid votes	890,790	97.64	–1.28		
Invalid votes	21,515	2.36	+1.28		
Votes cast / turnout	912,305	59.24	–6.75		
Abstentions	627,672	40.76	+6.75		
Registered voters	1,539,977				
Sources
Footnotes: ^{1} Forward–We Can–United Left–Spring–Andalusian Left results are compared to the combined totals of We Can and United Left/The Greens–Assembly for Andalusia in the 2015 election.; ^{2} Andalusia by Herself results are compared to Andalusian Party totals in the 2015 election.; ^{3} Zero Cuts–For a Fairer World–Green Group results are compared to Zero Cuts totals in the 2015 election.

=== 2015 ===
Summary of the 22 March 2015 Parliament of Andalusia election results in Seville
Parties and alliances	Popular vote			Seats	
Parties and alliances	Votes	%	±pp	Total	+/−
Spanish Socialist Workers' Party of Andalusia (PSOE–A)	380,093	38.07	–5.06	8	–1
People's Party (PP)	219,171	21.95	–13.34	4	–3
We Can (Podemos)	165,806	16.61	New	3	+3
Citizens–Party of the Citizenry (C's)	91,390	9.15	New	2	+2
United Left/The Greens–Assembly for Andalusia (IULV–CA)	70,067	7.02	–5.15	1	–1
Union, Progress and Democracy (UPyD)	18,540	1.86	–1.88	0	±0
Andalusian Party (PA)	16,571	1.66	–1.22	0	±0
Vox (Vox)	8,002	0.80	New	0	±0
Animalist Party Against Mistreatment of Animals (PACMA)	7,755	0.78	+0.57	0	±0
United Free Citizens (CILUS)	3,844	0.39	New	0	±0
Spanish Phalanx of the CNSO (FE de las JONS)	1,028	0.10	+0.04	0	±0
Zero Cuts (Recortes Cero)	894	0.09	+0.07	0	±0
Communist Party of the Peoples of Spain (PCPE)	561	0.06	–0.01	0	±0
Socialists and Republicans (SyR)	480	0.05	+0.02	0	±0
Local and Global (LyG)	317	0.03	New	0	±0
Andalusian Nationalist People (PNdeA)	302	0.03	+0.01	0	±0
Blank ballots	13,713	1.37	+0.41		
Total	998,534			18	±0
Valid votes	998,534	98.92	–0.44		
Invalid votes	10,923	1.08	+0.44		
Votes cast / turnout	1,009,457	65.99	+1.99		
Abstentions	520,366	34.01	–1.99		
Registered voters	1,529,823				

=== 2012 ===
Summary of the 25 March 2012 Parliament of Andalusia election results in Seville
Parties and alliances	Popular vote			Seats	
Parties and alliances	Votes	%	±pp	Total	+/−
Spanish Socialist Workers' Party of Andalusia (PSOE–A)	414,272	43.13	–11.27	9	–2
People's Party (PP)	338,964	35.29	+3.61	7	+1
United Left/The Greens–Assembly for Andalusia (IULV–CA)	116,865	12.17	+4.85	2	+1
Union, Progress and Democracy (UPyD)	35,917	3.74	+2.89	0	±0
Andalusian Party (PA)^{1}	27,638	2.88	–0.32	0	±0
Equo (Equo)	7,428	0.77	New	0	±0
Animalist Party Against Mistreatment of Animals (PACMA)	2,050	0.21	New	0	±0
Blank Seats (EB)	1,338	0.14	New	0	±0
Hartos.org (Hartos.org)	1,006	0.10	New	0	±0
We Won't Pay this Crisis (ECNP)	703	0.07	New	0	±0
Communist Party of the Peoples of Spain (PCPE)	632	0.07	–0.02	0	±0
For a Fairer World (PUM+J)	629	0.07	New	0	±0
Spanish Phalanx of the CNSO (FE de las JONS)	571	0.06	–0.01	0	±0
Democratic Majority (MD)	515	0.05	New	0	±0
Humanist Party (PH)	469	0.05	–0.02	0	±0
Engine and Sports Alternative (AMD)	362	0.04	New	0	±0
Socialists and Republicans (SyR)	332	0.03	New	0	±0
Liberal Democratic Centre (CDL)	312	0.03	New	0	±0
Family and Life Party (PFyV)	301	0.03	–0.05	0	±0
Internationalist Solidarity and Self-Management (SAIn)	289	0.03	New	0	±0
Communist Unification of Spain (UCE)	176	0.02	New	0	±0
Spanish Alternative (AES)	161	0.02	New	0	±0
Andalusian Nationalist People (PNdeA)	156	0.02	New	0	±0
Regionalist Call for Andalusia (CReA)	146	0.02	New	0	±0
Citizens of Democratic Centre (CCD)	127	0.01	New	0	±0
Blank ballots	9,231	0.96	–0.26		
Total	960,590			18	±0
Valid votes	960,590	99.36	–0.11		
Invalid votes	6,218	0.64	+0.11		
Votes cast / turnout	966,808	64.00	–9.71		
Abstentions	543,879	36.00	+9.71		
Registered voters	1,510,687				
Sources
Footnotes: ^{1} Andalusian Party results are compared to Andalusian Coalition totals in the 2008 election.

=== 2008 ===
Summary of the 9 March 2008 Parliament of Andalusia election results in Seville
Parties and alliances	Popular vote			Seats	
Parties and alliances	Votes	%	±pp	Total	+/−
Spanish Socialist Workers' Party of Andalusia (PSOE–A)	586,006	54.40	–1.54	11	±0
People's Party (PP)	341,239	31.68	+5.48	6	+1
United Left/The Greens–Assembly for Andalusia (IULV–CA)	78,854	7.32	–0.60	1	±0
Andalusian Coalition (CA)^{1}	34,524	3.20	–4.56	0	–1
Union, Progress and Democracy (UPyD)	9,172	0.85	New	0	±0
The Greens (LV)	5,614	0.52	New	0	±0
Andalusian Convergence (CAnda)	1,528	0.14	New	0	±0
Andalusian Social Democratic Party (PSDA)	1,477	0.14	+0.07	0	±0
Internationalist Solidarity and Self-Management (SAIn)	1,323	0.12	New	0	±0
Citizens–Party of the Citizenry (C's)	1,103	0.10	New	0	±0
Republican Left (IR)	910	0.08	–0.03	0	±0
Family and Life Party (PFyV)	890	0.08	New	0	±0
Spanish Phalanx of the CNSO (FE de las JONS)	747	0.07	–0.01	0	±0
Humanist Party (PH)	732	0.07	–0.05	0	±0
Blank ballots	13,122	1.22	–0.36		
Total	1,077,241			18	±0
Valid votes	1,077,241	99.47	+0.06		
Invalid votes	5,765	0.53	–0.06		
Votes cast / turnout	1,083,006	73.71	–3.29		
Abstentions	386,245	26.29	+3.29		
Registered voters	1,469,251				
Sources
Footnotes: ^{1} Andalusian Coalition results are compared to the combined totals of Andalusian Party, Andalusian Forum and Socialist Party of Andalusia in the 2004 election.

=== 2004 ===
Summary of the 14 March 2004 Parliament of Andalusia election results in Seville
Parties and alliances	Popular vote			Seats	
Parties and alliances	Votes	%	±pp	Total	+/−
Spanish Socialist Workers' Party of Andalusia (PSOE–A)	613,185	55.94	+7.36	11	+1
People's Party (PP)	287,210	26.20	–6.52	5	–1
United Left/The Greens–Assembly for Andalusia (IULV–CA)	86,798	7.92	–0.69	1	±0
Andalusian Party (PA)	67,404	6.15	–1.06	1	±0
Andalusian Forum (FA)	11,192	1.02	New	0	±0
Socialist Party of Andalusia (PSA)	6,437	0.59	New	0	±0
New Andalusian Green Left (NIVA)	1,541	0.14	New	0	±0
Humanist Party (PH)	1,293	0.12	+0.03	0	±0
Republican Left (IR)	1,185	0.11	New	0	±0
Andalusia Assembly (A)	929	0.08	+0.02	0	±0
Spanish Phalanx of the CNSO (FE de las JONS)^{1}	859	0.08	+0.04	0	±0
Andalusian Social Democratic Party (PSDA)	750	0.07	New	0	±0
Blank ballots	17,290	1.58	–0.05		
Total	1,096,073			18	±0
Valid votes	1,096,073	99.41	–0.01		
Invalid votes	6,542	0.59	+0.01		
Votes cast / turnout	1,102,615	77.00	+7.26		
Abstentions	329,290	23.00	–7.26		
Registered voters	1,431,905				
Sources
Footnotes: ^{1} Spanish Phalanx of the CNSO results are compared to Independent Spanish Phalanx totals in the 2000 election.

=== 2000 ===
Summary of the 12 March 2000 Parliament of Andalusia election results in Seville
Parties and alliances	Popular vote			Seats	
Parties and alliances	Votes	%	±pp	Total	+/−
Spanish Socialist Workers' Party of Andalusia (PSOE–A)	481,399	49.53	+2.16	10	±0
People's Party (PP)	314,166	32.32	+2.58	6	±0
United Left/The Greens–Assembly for Andalusia (IULV–CA)	83,660	8.61	–5.25	1	–1
Andalusian Party (PA)	70,084	7.21	–0.33	1	±0
Andalusian Left (IA)	1,755	0.18	New	0	±0
Humanist Party (PH)	836	0.09	–0.02	0	±0
Andalusian Nation (NA)	754	0.08	–0.01	0	±0
Voice of the Andalusian People (VDPA)	732	0.08	±0.00	0	±0
Party of the Separated and Divorced (PSD)	694	0.07	New	0	±0
The Phalanx (FE)	594	0.06	New	0	±0
Andalusia Assembly (A)	558	0.06	New	0	±0
Centrist Union–Democratic and Social Centre (UC–CDS)	492	0.05	New	0	±0
Independent Spanish Phalanx (FEI)	355	0.04	New	0	±0
Blank ballots	15,867	1.63	+0.70		
Total	971,946			18	–1
Valid votes	971,946	99.42	–0.06		
Invalid votes	5,676	0.58	+0.06		
Votes cast / turnout	977,622	69.74	–9.86		
Abstentions	424,108	30.26	+9.86		
Registered voters	1,401,730				

=== 1996 ===
Summary of the 3 March 1996 Parliament of Andalusia election results in Seville
Parties and alliances	Popular vote			Seats	
Parties and alliances	Votes	%	±pp	Total	+/−
Spanish Socialist Workers' Party of Andalusia (PSOE–A)	492,994	47.37	+5.41	10	+2
People's Party (PP)	309,531	29.74	–0.90	6	±0
United Left/The Greens–Assembly for Andalusia (IULV–CA)	144,269	13.86	–5.66	2	–1
Andalusian Party (PA)^{1}	78,516	7.54	+1.73	1	±0
Communist Party of the Andalusian People (PCPA)	1,689	0.16	–0.21	0	±0
Humanist Party (PH)	1,139	0.11	–0.01	0	±0
Authentic Spanish Phalanx (FEA)	1,138	0.11	New	0	±0
Andalusian Nation (NA)	906	0.09	–0.08	0	±0
Voice of the Andalusian People (VDPA)	840	0.08	New	0	±0
Blank ballots	9,662	0.93	–0.23		
Total	1,040,684			19	+1
Valid votes	1,040,684	99.48	+0.02		
Invalid votes	5,473	0.52	–0.02		
Votes cast / turnout	1,046,157	79.60	+11.05		
Abstentions	268,054	20.40	–11.05		
Registered voters	1,314,211				
Sources
Footnotes: ^{1} Andalusian Party results are compared to Andalusian Coalition–Andalusian Power totals in the 1994 election.

=== 1994 ===
Summary of the 12 June 1994 Parliament of Andalusia election results in Seville
Parties and alliances	Popular vote			Seats	
Parties and alliances	Votes	%	±pp	Total	+/−
Spanish Socialist Workers' Party of Andalusia (PSOE–A)	361,350	41.96	–8.39	8	–2
People's Party (PP)	263,864	30.64	+11.11	6	+2
United Left/The Greens–Assembly for Andalusia (IULV–CA)	168,064	19.52	+6.97	3	+1
Andalusian Coalition–Andalusian Power (PA–PAP)^{1}	50,049	5.81	–7.78	1	–1
Communist Party of the Andalusian People (PCPA)	3,211	0.37	+0.12	0	±0
Andalusian Nation (NA)^{2}	1,454	0.17	+0.12	0	±0
Forum–Democratic and Social Centre (Foro–CDS)	1,187	0.14	–0.27	0	±0
Humanist Party (PH)	1,014	0.12	+0.06	0	±0
Spanish Phalanx of the CNSO (FE–JONS)	633	0.07	–0.01	0	±0
Independent Spanish Phalanx (FEI)	350	0.04	New	0	±0
Blank ballots	9,959	1.16	+0.61		
Total	861,135			18	±0
Valid votes	861,135	99.46	–0.11		
Invalid votes	4,646	0.54	+0.11		
Votes cast / turnout	865,781	68.55	+13.59		
Abstentions	397,250	31.45	–13.59		
Registered voters	1,263,031				
Sources
Footnotes: ^{1} Andalusian Coalition–Andalusian Power results are compared to Andalusian Party totals in the 1990 election.; ^{2} Andalusian Nation results are compared to Andalusian Front of Liberation totals in the 1990 election.

=== 1990 ===
Summary of the 23 June 1990 Parliament of Andalusia election results in Seville
Parties and alliances	Popular vote			Seats	
Parties and alliances	Votes	%	±pp	Total	+/−
Spanish Socialist Workers' Party of Andalusia (PSOE–A)	318,533	50.37	+1.77	10	±0
People's Party (PP)^{1}	123,360	19.51	–0.48	4	±0
Andalusian Party (PA)	85,946	13.59	+4.74	2	+1
United Left–Assembly for Andalusia (IU–CA)	79,342	12.55	–4.95	2	–1
Workers' Party of Spain–Communist Unity (PTE–UC)^{2}	4,477	0.71	–1.13	0	±0
Greens of Andalusia (VA)	3,495	0.55	New	0	±0
Socialist Democracy (DS)	3,133	0.50	New	0	±0
Democratic and Social Centre (CDS)	2,636	0.42	–1.30	0	±0
The Ecologist Greens (LVE)	2,310	0.37	New	0	±0
Communist Party of the Andalusian People (PCPA)	1,605	0.25	New	0	±0
Ruiz-Mateos Group (ARM)	1,578	0.25	New	0	±0
Communist Party of Spain (Marxist–Leninist) (PCE (m–l))	759	0.12	New	0	±0
Spanish Phalanx of the CNSO (FE–JONS)	525	0.08	New	0	±0
Humanist Party (PH)	361	0.06	–0.11	0	±0
Andalusian Front of Liberation (FAL)	340	0.05	New	0	±0
Alliance for the Republic (AxR)	339	0.05	New	0	±0
Falangist Movement of Spain (MFE)	188	0.03	New	0	±0
Blank ballots	3,474	0.55	+0.20		
Total	632,401			18	±0
Valid votes	632,401	99.53	+0.80		
Invalid votes	3,002	0.47	–0.80		
Votes cast / turnout	635,403	54.97	–18.26		
Abstentions	520,515	45.06	+18.26		
Registered voters	1,155,918				
Sources
Footnotes: ^{1} People's Party results are compared to People's Coalition totals in the 1986 election.; ^{2} Workers' Party of Spain–Communist Unity results are compared to Communists' Unity Board totals in the 1986 election.

=== 1986 ===
Summary of the 22 June 1986 Parliament of Andalusia election results in Seville
Parties and alliances	Popular vote			Seats	
Parties and alliances	Votes	%	±pp	Total	+/−
Spanish Socialist Workers' Party of Andalusia (PSOE–A)	386,940	48.60	–4.73	10	–1
People's Coalition (AP–PDP–PL)^{1}	159,129	19.99	+1.38	4	+1
United Left–Assembly for Andalusia (IU–CA)^{2}	139,371	17.50	+7.41	3	+1
Andalusian Party (PA)	70,477	8.85	+3.27	1	±0
Communists' Unity Board (MUC)	14,687	1.84	New	0	±0
Democratic and Social Centre (CDS)	13,669	1.72	New	0	±0
Socialist Party of the Andalusian People (PSPA)	3,461	0.43	New	0	±0
Democratic Reformist Party (PRD)	3,190	0.40	New	0	±0
Humanist Party (PH)	1,350	0.17	New	0	±0
Andalusian Liberation (LA)	1,199	0.15	New	0	±0
Union of the Democratic Centre (UCD)	n/a	n/a	–9.28	0	–1
Blank ballots	2,766	0.35	–0.04		
Total	796,239			18	±0
Valid votes	796,239	98.73	–0.29		
Invalid votes	10,283	1.27	+0.29		
Votes cast / turnout	806,522	73.23	+4.98		
Abstentions	294,860	26.77	–4.98		
Registered voters	1,101,382				
Sources
Footnotes: ^{1} People's Coalition results are compared to People's Alliance–People's Democratic Party totals in the 1982 election.; ^{2} United Left–Assembly for Andalusia results are compared to Communist Party of Andalusia totals in the 1982 election.

=== 1982 ===
Summary of the 23 May 1982 Parliament of Andalusia election results in Seville
Parties and alliances	Popular vote			Seats	
Parties and alliances	Votes	%	±pp	Total	+/−
Spanish Socialist Workers' Party of Andalusia (PSOE–A)	357,109	53.33	n/a	11	n/a
People's Alliance (AP)	124,596	18.61	n/a	3	n/a
Communist Party of Andalusia (PCA–PCE)	67,566	10.09	n/a	2	n/a
Union of the Democratic Centre (UCD)	62,142	9.28	n/a	1	n/a
Socialist Party of Andalusia–Andalusian Party (PSA–PA)	37,348	5.58	n/a	1	n/a
New Force (FN)	5,486	0.82	n/a	0	n/a
Spanish Communist Workers' Party (PCOE)	4,313	0.64	n/a	0	n/a
Workers' Socialist Party (PST)	4,220	0.63	n/a	0	n/a
Communist Movement of Andalusia (MCA)	1,112	0.17	n/a	0	n/a
Communist Unification of Spain (UCE)	953	0.14	n/a	0	n/a
Communist Party of Spain (Marxist–Leninist) (PCE (m–l))	816	0.12	n/a	0	n/a
Falangist Movement of Spain (MFE)	804	0.12	n/a	0	n/a
Revolutionary Communist League (LCR)	502	0.07	n/a	0	n/a
Blank ballots	2,606	0.39	n/a		
Total	669,573			18	n/a
Valid votes	669,573	99.02	n/a		
Invalid votes	6,644	0.98	n/a		
Votes cast / turnout	676,217	68.25	n/a		
Abstentions	314,529	31.75	n/a		
Registered voters	990,746				

== Bibliography ==
- Real Decreto-ley 20/1977, de 18 de marzo, sobre Normas Electorales (Royal Decree-Law 20/1977). Official State Gazette (in Spanish). 18 March 1977. BOE-A-1977-7445.
- Ley Orgánica 6/1981, de 30 de diciembre, de Estatuto de Autonomía para Andalucía (Organic Law 6/1981). Official State Gazette (in Spanish). 30 December 1981. BOE-A-1982-633.
- Decreto 18/1982, de ocho de Marzo, por el que se convocan Elecciones al Parlamento de Andalucía (PDF) (Decree 18/1982). Official Gazette of the Regional Government of Andalusia (in Spanish). 8 March 1982.
- Ley Orgánica 5/1985, de 19 de junio, del Régimen Electoral General (Organic Law 5/1985). Official State Gazette (in Spanish). 19 June 1985. BOE-A-1985-11672.
- Ley 1/1986, de 2 de enero, Electoral de Andalucía (Law 1/1986). Official State Gazette (in Spanish). 2 January 1986. BOE-A-1986-2788.
- Ley Orgánica 2/2007, de 19 de marzo, de reforma del Estatuto de Autonomía para Andalucía (Organic Law 2/2007). Official State Gazette (in Spanish). 19 March 2007. BOE-A-2007-5825.
