= Europe of the Peoples =

Europe of the Peoples (or variants) was the name adopted by various electoral coalitions formed in Spain for elections to the European Parliament. The coalitions were headed by Republican Left of Catalonia and Basque Solidarity:

- Coalition for the Europe of the Peoples, in the 1987 election.
- For the Europe of the Peoples (1989), in the 1989 election.
- For the Europe of the Peoples (1994), in the 1994 election.
- Nationalist Coalition–Europe of the Peoples, in the 1999 election (combined with Nationalist Coalition).
- Europe of the Peoples (2004), in the 2004 election.
- Europe of the Peoples–Greens, in the 2009 election.
