= 1994 Andalusian regional election =

Election in the Spanish region of Andalusia

- 12 June 1994

All 109 seats in the Parliament of Andalusia 55 seats needed for a majority
- Opinion polls
- Registered: 5,389,552 ▲7.6%
- Turnout: 3,625,445 (67.3%) ▲12.0 pp
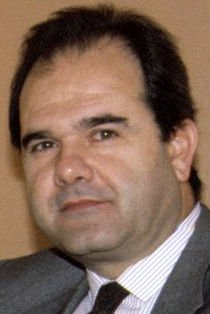

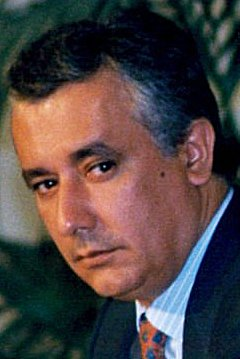

	First party	Second party	Third party
Leader	Manuel Chaves	Javier Arenas	Luis Carlos Rejón
Party	PSOE–A	PP	IULV–CA
Leader since	19 April 1990	25 July 1993	21 July 1988
Leader's seat	Cádiz	Seville	Córdoba
Last election	62 seats, 49.6%	26 seats, 22.2%	11 seats, 12.7%
Seats won	45	41	20
Seat change	▼17	▲15	▲9
Popular vote	1,395,131	1,238,252	689,815
Percentage	38.7%	34.4%	19.1%
Swing	▼10.9 pp	▲12.2 pp	▲6.4 pp
	Fourth party
Leader	Pedro Pacheco
Party	PA–PAP
Leader since	1994
Leader's seat	Cádiz
Last election	10 seats, 10.8% (Note: Results for PA in the 1990 election.)
Seats won	3
Seat change	▼7
Popular vote	208,862
Percentage	5.8%
Swing	▼5.0 pp
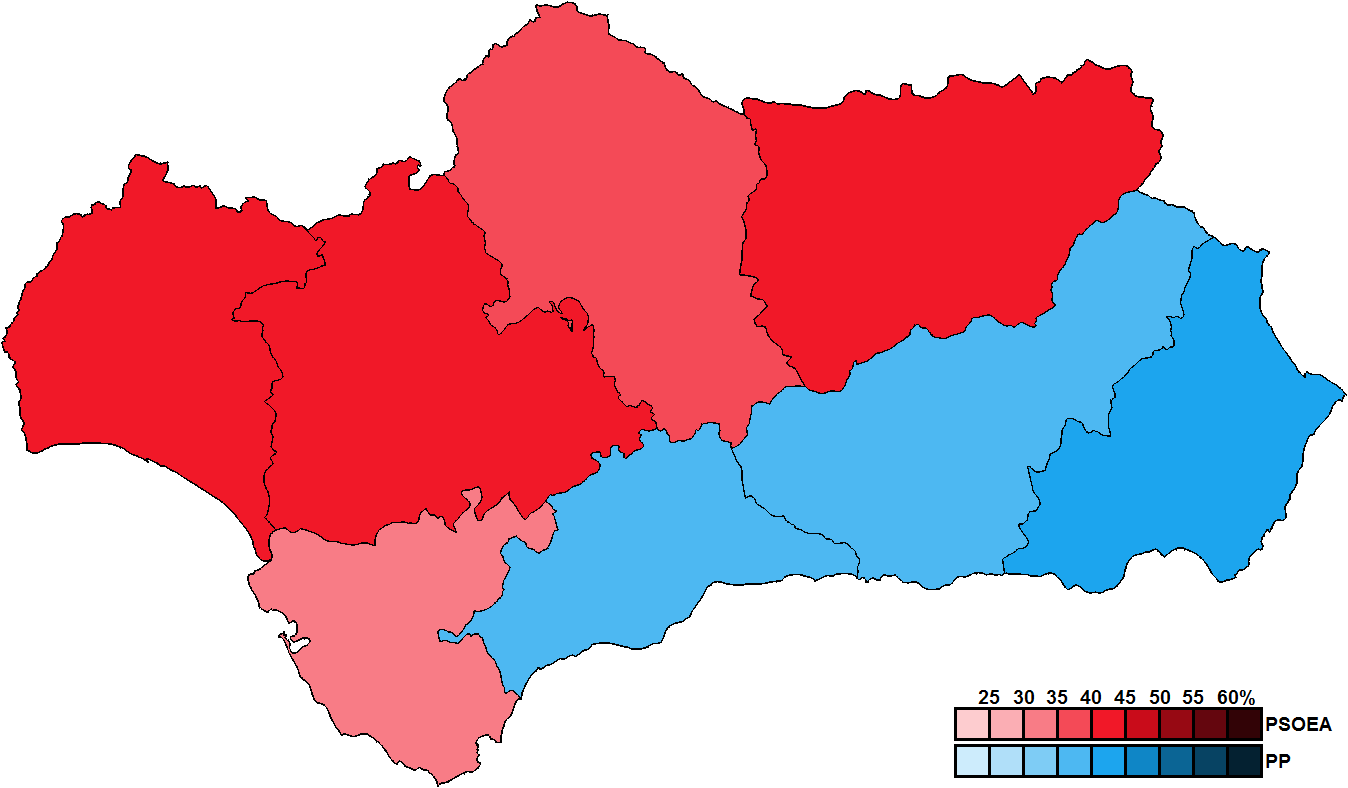
- Constituency results map for the Parliament of Andalusia
President before election
Manuel Chaves
PSOE–A
President after election
Manuel Chaves
PSOE–A

A regional election was held in Andalusia on 12 June 1994 to elect the 4th Parliament of the autonomous community. All 109 seats in the Parliament were up for election. It was held concurrently with the 1994 European Parliament election.

The candidate for the PSOE, Manuel Chaves, was invested as President of the Regional Government of Andalusia after winning the election. However, the poor results obtained by his party forced him to form a minority government 10 seats short of a majority. Eventually, a snap election had to be called in 1996 due to the impracticality of government resulting from the union, at times, of the two main opposition parties (People's Party and United Left).

== Overview ==
Under the 1981 Statute of Autonomy, the Parliament of Andalusia was the unicameral legislature of the homonymous autonomous community, having legislative power in devolved matters, as well as the ability to grant or withdraw confidence from a regional president. The electoral and procedural rules were supplemented by national law provisions.

=== Date ===
The term of the Parliament of Andalusia expired four years after the date of its previous election, unless it was dissolved earlier. The election decree was required to be issued no later than 25 days before the scheduled expiration date of parliament and published on the following day in the Official Gazette of the Regional Government of Andalusia (BOJA), with election day taking place 54 days after the decree's publication (barring any date within from 1 July to 31 August). The previous election was held on 23 June 1990, which meant that the chamber's term would have expired on 23 June 1994. Due to the ban on summer elections, the latest possible date for election day was 30 June 1994, meaning the election decree was required to be published in the BOJA no later than 7 May 1994.

Amendments earlier in 1994 granted the regional president the prerogative to dissolve the Parliament of Andalusia at any given time and call a snap election, provided that no motion of no confidence was in process and that dissolution did not occur before one year after a previous one.

The election to the Parliament of Andalusia was officially called on 19 April 1994 with the publication of the corresponding decree in the BOJA, setting election day for 12 June and scheduling for the chamber to reconvene on 5 July.

=== Electoral system ===
Voting for the Parliament was based on universal suffrage, comprising all Spanish nationals over 18 years of age, registered in Andalusia and with full political rights, provided that they had not been deprived of the right to vote by a final sentence, nor were legally incapacitated.

The Parliament of Andalusia had a minimum of 90 and a maximum of 110 seats, with electoral provisions fixing its size at 109. All were elected in eight multi-member constituencies—corresponding to the provinces of Almería, Cádiz, Córdoba, Granada, Huelva, Jaén, Málaga and Seville, each of which was assigned an initial minimum of eight seats and the remaining 45 distributed in proportion to population (with the number of seats in each province not exceeding two times that of any other)—using the D'Hondt method and closed-list proportional voting, with a three percent-threshold of valid votes (including blank ballots) in each constituency. The use of this electoral method resulted in a higher effective threshold depending on district magnitude and vote distribution.

As a result of the aforementioned allocation, each Parliament constituency was entitled the following seats:

Seats	Constituencies
18	Seville
16	Málaga
15	Cádiz
13	Córdoba, Granada
12	Jaén
11	Almería, Huelva

The law did not provide for by-elections to fill vacant seats; instead, any vacancies arising after the proclamation of candidates and during the legislative term were filled by the next candidates on the party lists or, when required, by designated substitutes.

=== Outgoing parliament ===
The table below shows the composition of the parliamentary groups in the chamber at the time of the election call.

Parliamentary composition in April 1994
Parliamentary groups	Parties	Legislators	
Parliamentary groups	Parties	Seats	Total
Socialist Parliamentary Group	PSOE–A	62	62
Andalusian People's Parliamentary Group	PP	26	26
United Left/The Greens Parliamentary Group	IULV–CA	11	11
Andalusian Parliamentary Group	PA	6	6
Mixed Group	PAP	4 (Note: Manuel González Fustegueras, José Guerrero, Antonio Núñez and Pedro Pacheco, former PA legislators.)	4

== Parties and candidates ==
The electoral law allowed for parties and federations registered in the interior ministry, alliances and groupings of electors to present lists of candidates. Parties and federations intending to form an alliance were required to inform the relevant electoral commission within 10 days of the election call, whereas groupings of electors needed to secure the signature of at least one percent of the electorate in the constituencies for which they sought election, disallowing electors from signing for more than one list.

Below is a list of the main parties and alliances which contested the election:

Candidacy	Parties and alliances	Leading candidate	Ideology	Previous result		Gov.	Ref.
Candidacy	Parties and alliances	Leading candidate	Ideology	Vote %	Seats	Gov.	Ref.
PSOE–A	List: Spanish Socialist Workers' Party of Andalusia (PSOE–A)	Manuel Chaves	Social democracy	49.6%	62	Yes	
PP	List: People's Party (PP)	Javier Arenas	Conservatism; Christian democracy	22.2%	26	No	
IULV–CA	List: United Left/The Greens–Assembly for Andalusia (IULV–CA) – Communist Party of Andalusia (PCA) – Socialist Action Party (PASOC) – Republican Left (IR) – Collectives for the Unity of Workers (CUT)	Luis Carlos Rejón	Socialism; Communism	12.7%	11	No	
PA–PAP	List: Andalusian Party (PA); Andalusian Power (PAP)	Pedro Pacheco	Andalusian nationalism Social democracy	10.8%	10	No	

== Campaign ==
=== Debates ===
1994 Andalusian regional election debates
Date	Organizer(s)	Moderator(s)	P Present (Note: Denotes a main invitee attending the event.) S Surrogate (Note: Denotes a main invitee not attending the event, sending a surrogate in their place.) NI Not invited I Invited A Absent invitee			
Date	Organizer(s)	Moderator(s)	PSOE–A	PP	Audience	Ref.
2 June	Canal Sur; Antena 3	Manuel Campo Vidal	P Chaves	P Arenas	40.6% (1,102,000)	

== Opinion polls ==
The tables below list opinion polling results in reverse chronological order, showing the most recent first and using the dates when the survey fieldwork was done, as opposed to the date of publication. Where the fieldwork dates are unknown, the date of publication is given instead. The highest percentage figure in each polling survey is displayed with its background shaded in the leading party's colour. If a tie ensues, this is applied to the figures with the highest percentages. The "Lead" column on the right shows the percentage-point difference between the parties with the highest percentages in a poll.

=== Voting intention estimates ===
The table below lists weighted voting intention estimates. Refusals are generally excluded from the party vote percentages, while question wording and the treatment of "don't know" responses and those not intending to vote may vary between polling organisations. When available, seat projections determined by the polling organisations are displayed below (or in place of) the percentages in a smaller font; 55 seats were required for an absolute majority in the Parliament of Andalusia.

Color key:

Exit poll

Polling firm/Commissioner	Fieldwork date	Sample size	Turnout	PSOE–A	PP	IULV	PA	PAP	CA–PA	Lead
1994 regional election	12 Jun 1994	—N/a	67.3	38.7; 45	34.4; 41	19.1; 20	(Note: Within PA–PAP.)		5.8; 3	4.3
Sigma Dos/COPE	12 Jun 1994	?	?	? 46/47	? 41/44	? 17			? 3	?
Vox Pública/Antena 3	12 Jun 1994	?	?	? 46	? 41	? 19			? 3	?
Demoscopia/Cadena SER	12 Jun 1994	?	?	? 43/47	? 37/43	? 18/22			? 3/4	?
Eco Consulting/RTVE	12 Jun 1994	?	?	? 45/48	? 37/39	? 20/23			? 2/4	?
ICP–Research/Diario 16	5 Jun 1994	?	?	40.6; 46/48	26.8; 30/33	19.2; 17/21			5.4; 3/4	13.8
Sigma Dos/El Mundo	3–4 Jun 1994	?	?	39.4; 45/49	32.2; 38/40	17.8; 17/20			6.9; 3/5	7.2
Opina/La Vanguardia	30 May–1 Jun 1994	2,000	?	40.0; 45/49	34.0; 37/41	15.0; 14/16			8.0; 7/9	6.0
Demoscopia/El País	29–31 May 1994	?	?	40.7; 48/51	30.9; 34/37	18.2; 18/20			7.9; 5	9.8
Metra Seis	26–31 May 1994	3,700	?	? 41/46	? 35/39	? 16/18			? 9/16	?
CIS	19–23 May 1994	2,000	?	? 45/46	? 37/38	? 19/20			? 3/4	?
Sigma Dos/El Mundo	16 May 1994	?	?	39.2; 44/49	31.4; 37/39	? 14/16			? 9/11	6.8
CIS	13–28 Apr 1994	4,000	?	? 45	? 38	? 20			? 6	?
Opina/La Vanguardia	8–11 Apr 1994	2,000	?	37.0; 42/46	34.0; 36/40	14.0; 14/15			12.0; 12/13	3.0
PSOE	7 Apr 1994	?	?	? 42	? 32/35	? 20			? 12/15	?
PP	7 Mar 1994	2,500	?	40.0– 42.0; 50/53	34.0; 38/41	13.0– 16.0; 14/16	3.0; 4.0; 1/2	–	–	6.0– 8.0
PP	5–18 Nov 1993	2,500	?	42.0; 52/55	32.0; 36	14.0; 14/16	4.0– 6.0; 1/2	3.0; 1	–	10.0
1993 general election	6 Jun 1993	—N/a	76.2	51.5 (63)	29.8 (35)	12.1 (11)	2.4 (0)	1.1 (0)	–	21.7
1990 regional election	23 Jun 1990	—N/a	55.3	49.6; 62	22.2; 26	12.7; 11	10.8; 10	–	–	27.4

=== Voting preferences ===
The table below lists raw, unweighted voting preferences.

Polling firm/Commissioner	Fieldwork date	Sample size	PSOE–A	PP	IULV	PA	PAP	CA–PA	Question	X mark	Lead
1994 regional election (Note: Does not include non-resident citizens.)	12 Jun 1994	—N/a	25.9	23.2	12.9			3.9	—N/a	32.3	2.7
CIS	19–23 May 1994	1,994	26.6	18.6	11.5			4.8	29.4	7.7	8.0
CIS	13 Apr–2 May 1994	3,992	26.2	19.4	11.8	4.9	0.5	–	28.5	6.5	6.8
1993 general election	6 Jun 1993	—N/a	39.1	22.8	9.2	1.8	0.8	–	—N/a	23.5	16.3
CIS	11–24 Nov 1992	4,446	29.4	7.7	6.4	7.6	–	–	34.8	12.8	21.7
1990 regional election	23 Jun 1990	—N/a	27.4	12.3	7.0	6.0	–	–	—N/a	44.5	15.1

=== Victory preferences ===
The table below lists opinion polling on the victory preferences for each party in the event of a regional election taking place.

Polling firm/Commissioner	Fieldwork date	Sample size	PSOE–A	PP	IULV	PA	Other/ None	Question	Lead
Opina/La Vanguardia	30 May–1 Jun 1994	2,000	23.2	21.3	9.3	5.9	4.7	35.6	1.9
CIS	19–23 May 1994	1,994	32.4	21.1	–	–	10.1	36.4	11.3
CIS	13 Apr–2 May 1994	3,992	34.1	22.9	–	–	9.3	33.7	11.2
Opina/La Vanguardia	8–11 Apr 1994	2,000	18.1	21.8	7.7	4.2	1.6	46.7	3.7

=== Victory likelihood ===
The table below lists opinion polling on the perceived likelihood of victory for each party in the event of a regional election taking place.

Polling firm/Commissioner	Fieldwork date	Sample size	PSOE–A	PP	IULV	PA	Other/ None	Question	Lead
Opina/La Vanguardia	30 May–1 Jun 1994	2,000	42.7	12.1	1.2	2.4	1.0	40.5	30.6
CIS	19–23 May 1994	1,994	40.6	13.8	–	–	21.0	24.6	26.8
CIS	13 Apr–2 May 1994	3,992	37.2	14.8	–	–	18.6	29.4	22.4
Opina/La Vanguardia	8–11 Apr 1994	2,000	37.2	12.0	2.2	2.2	0.7	45.7	25.2

== Results ==
=== Overall ===
← Summary of 12 June 1994 Parliament of Andalusia election results →
Parties and alliances	Popular vote			Seats	
Parties and alliances	Votes	%	±pp	Total	+/−
Spanish Socialist Workers' Party of Andalusia (PSOE–A)	1,395,131	38.72	−10.88	45	−17
People's Party (PP)	1,238,252	34.36	+12.18	41	+15
United Left/The Greens–Assembly for Andalusia (IULV–CA)	689,815	19.14	+6.47	20	+9
Andalusian Coalition–Andalusian Power (PA–PAP)^{1}	208,862	5.80	−4.95	3	−7
Communist Party of the Andalusian People (PCPA)	12,078	0.34	+0.11	0	±0
Forum–Democratic and Social Centre (Foro–CDS)	9,875	0.27	−0.91	0	±0
Andalusian Nation (NA)^{2}	9,690	0.27	+0.21	0	±0
Humanist Party (PH)	5,510	0.15	+0.08	0	±0
Spanish Phalanx of the CNSO (FE–JONS)	2,637	0.07	−0.01	0	±0
Socialist October (OS)	641	0.02	New	0	±0
Independent Spanish Phalanx (FEI)	350	0.01	New	0	±0
Blank ballots	30,750	0.85	+0.41		
Total	3,603,591			109	±0
Valid votes	3,603,591	99.40	−0.16		
Invalid votes	21,854	0.60	+0.16		
Votes cast / turnout	3,625,445	67.27	+11.93		
Abstentions	1,764,107	32.73	−11.93		
Registered voters	5,389,552				
Sources
Footnotes: ^{1} Andalusian Coalition–Andalusian Power results are compared to Andalusian Party totals in the 1990 election.; ^{2} Andalusian Nation results are compared to Andalusian Front of Liberation totals in the 1990 election.

Popular vote
PSOE–A	38.72%
PP	34.36%
IULV–CA	19.14%
PA–PAP	5.80%
Others	1.13%
Blank ballots	0.85%

Seats
PSOE–A	41.28%
PP	37.61%
IULV–CA	18.35%
PA–PAP	2.75%

=== Distribution by constituency ===
Constituency	PSOE–A		PP		IULV–CA		PA–PAP	
Constituency	%	S	%	S	%	S	%	S
Almería	38.1	5	41.9	5	15.0	1	3.2	−
Cádiz	34.5	5	33.2	5	18.2	3	11.6	2
Córdoba	37.5	6	30.8	4	24.6	3	5.3	−
Granada	38.3	5	38.6	6	16.8	2	4.4	−
Huelva	44.1	5	33.3	4	15.7	2	5.2	−
Jaén	42.6	5	35.9	5	15.6	2	4.1	−
Málaga	34.3	6	36.5	6	22.4	4	4.7	−
Seville	42.0	8	30.6	6	19.5	3	5.8	1
Total	38.7	45	34.4	41	19.1	20	5.8	3

== Aftermath ==
=== Government formation ===
Investiture; Nomination of Manuel Chaves (PSOE–A)
Ballot →	20 July 1994	23 July 1994	29 July 1994 (Note: 19 IULV–CA MPs did not participate in 29 July vote.)
Required majority →	55 out of 109	Simple	Simple
Yes: • PSOE–A (44) (43 on 23 Jul)	44 / 109	43 / 109	44 / 109
No: • PP (41) (40 on 20 Jul); • IULV–CA (20) (until 23 Jul); • PA–PAP (3) (until 23 Jul)	63 / 109	64 / 109	41 / 109
Abstentions: • PA–PAP (3) (on 29 Jul); • IULV–CA (1) (on 29 Jul)	0 / 109	0 / 109	4 / 109
Absentees: • PSOE–A (1) (2 on 23 Jul); • PP (1) (on 20 Jul)	2 / 109	2 / 109	1 / 109

== Bibliography ==
- Ley Orgánica 6/1981, de 30 de diciembre, de Estatuto de Autonomía para Andalucía (Organic Law 6/1981). Official State Gazette (in Spanish). 30 December 1981. BOE-A-1982-633.
- Ley 6/1983, de 21 de julio, del Gobierno y la Administración de la Comunidad Autónoma (Law 6/1983). Official State Gazette (in Spanish). 21 July 1983. BOE-A-1983-23960.
- Ley Orgánica 5/1985, de 19 de junio, del Régimen Electoral General (Organic Law 5/1985). Official State Gazette (in Spanish). 19 June 1985 [version as of 31 March 1994]. BOE-A-1985-11672.
- Ley 1/1986, de 2 de enero, Electoral de Andalucía (Law 1/1986). Official State Gazette (in Spanish). 2 January 1986 [version as of 25 May 1994]. BOE-A-1986-2788.
- Ley 6/1994, de 18 de mayo, de Modificación de la Ley 6/1983, de 21 de julio, del Gobierno y la Administración de la Comunidad Autónoma, y la Ley 1/1986, de 2 de enero, Electoral de Andalucía (Law 6/1994). Official State Gazette (in Spanish). 18 May 1994. BOE-A-1994-14602.
- Decreto del Presidente 85/1994, de 18 de abril, por el que se convocan elecciones al Parlamento de Andalucía (PDF) (Decree 85/1994). Official Gazette of the Regional Government of Andalusia (in Spanish). 18 April 1994.
