= For the Europe of the Peoples (1994) =

For the Europe of the Peoples Por la Europa de los Pueblos
- Founded: 1994
- Dissolved: 1999
- Preceded by: For the Europe of the Peoples (1989)
- Succeeded by: Nationalist Coalition–Europe of the Peoples
- Ideology: Peripheral nationalism

For the Europe of the Peoples (Spanish: Por la Europa de los Pueblos, PEP) was a Spanish electoral list in the European Parliament election in 1994 made up from regionalist parties. It was the successor of the 1989 coalition of the same name.

== Composition ==
Party	Scope
Basque Solidarity (EA)	Basque Country, Navarre
Catalan Action (AC)	Catalonia
Republican Left of Catalonia (ERC)	Catalonia
Nationalist and Ecologist Agreement (ENE)	Balearic Islands
Commoners' Land–Castilian Nationalist Party (TC–PNC)	Cantabria, Castile and León, Castilla–La Mancha, La Rioja, Madrid

== Electoral performance ==
=== European Parliament ===
European Parliament
Election	Vote	%	Seats
1994	239,339 (#6)	1.29	0 / 64
