= For the Europe of the Peoples (1989) =

For the Europe of the Peoples Por la Europa de los Pueblos
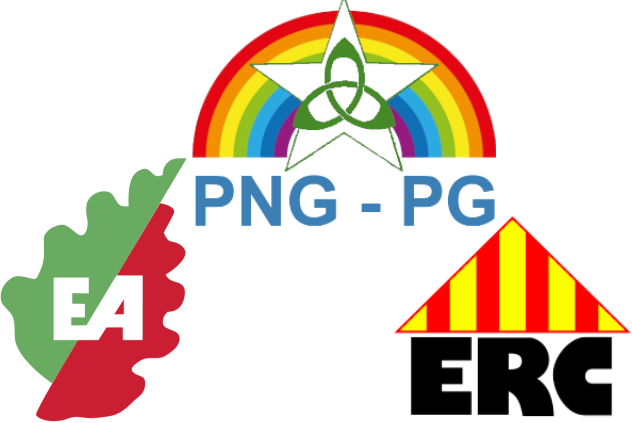
- Founded: 1989
- Dissolved: 1994
- Preceded by: Coalition for the Europe of the Peoples
- Succeeded by: For the Europe of the Peoples (1994)
- Ideology: Peripheral nationalism
- Political position: Centre-left
- European Parliament group: Rainbow Group

For the Europe of the Peoples (Spanish: Por la Europa de los Pueblos, PEP) was a Spanish electoral list in the European Parliament election in 1989 made up from regionalist parties. It was the successor of the 1987 Coalition for the Europe of the Peoples.

== Composition ==
Party	Scope
Basque Solidarity (EA)	Basque Country, Navarre
Republican Left of Catalonia (ERC)	Catalonia
Galician Nationalist Party–Galicianist Party (PNG–PG)	Galicia

== Electoral performance ==
=== European Parliament ===
European Parliament
Election	Vote	%	Seats
1989	238,909 (#11)	1.51	1 / 60
