= Andalusian Progress Party =

Andalusian Progress Party Partido Andaluz del Progreso
- Chairman: Pedro Pacheco Herrera
- Founded: May 23, 1993
- Dissolved: 1996
- Merged into: Andalusian Party
- Ideology: Andalusian nationalism Social democracy
- Colors: Light green White
- Parliament of Andalusia (1993-1994): 4 / 109
- Parliament of Andalusia (1994-1996): 1 / 109

The Andalusian Progress Party (in Spanish: Partido Andaluz del Progreso; PAP) was an Andalusian nationalist political party in Andalusia, founded in 1993 by Pedro Pacheco (then mayor of Jerez de la Frontera), as the result of a split in the Andalusian Party (PA) due to the confrontation between Alejandro Rojas-Marcos and Pacheco himself, who it ended with the departure of him and his supporters from the party.

== History ==
After the split, the PAP had four of the ten former deputies in the Parliament of Andalusia and several mayors of the PA. In the general elections of 1993 the party gained 43,169 votes and no representation, while in the Andalusian elections of 1994 the party joined a coalition with the PA called Andalusian Coalition–Andalusian Power. The coalition gained 3 seats. In 1996 PAP joined the PA again.
