= Andalusian Coalition–Andalusian Power =

Andalusian Coalition–Andalusian Power Coalición Andalucista–Poder Andaluz
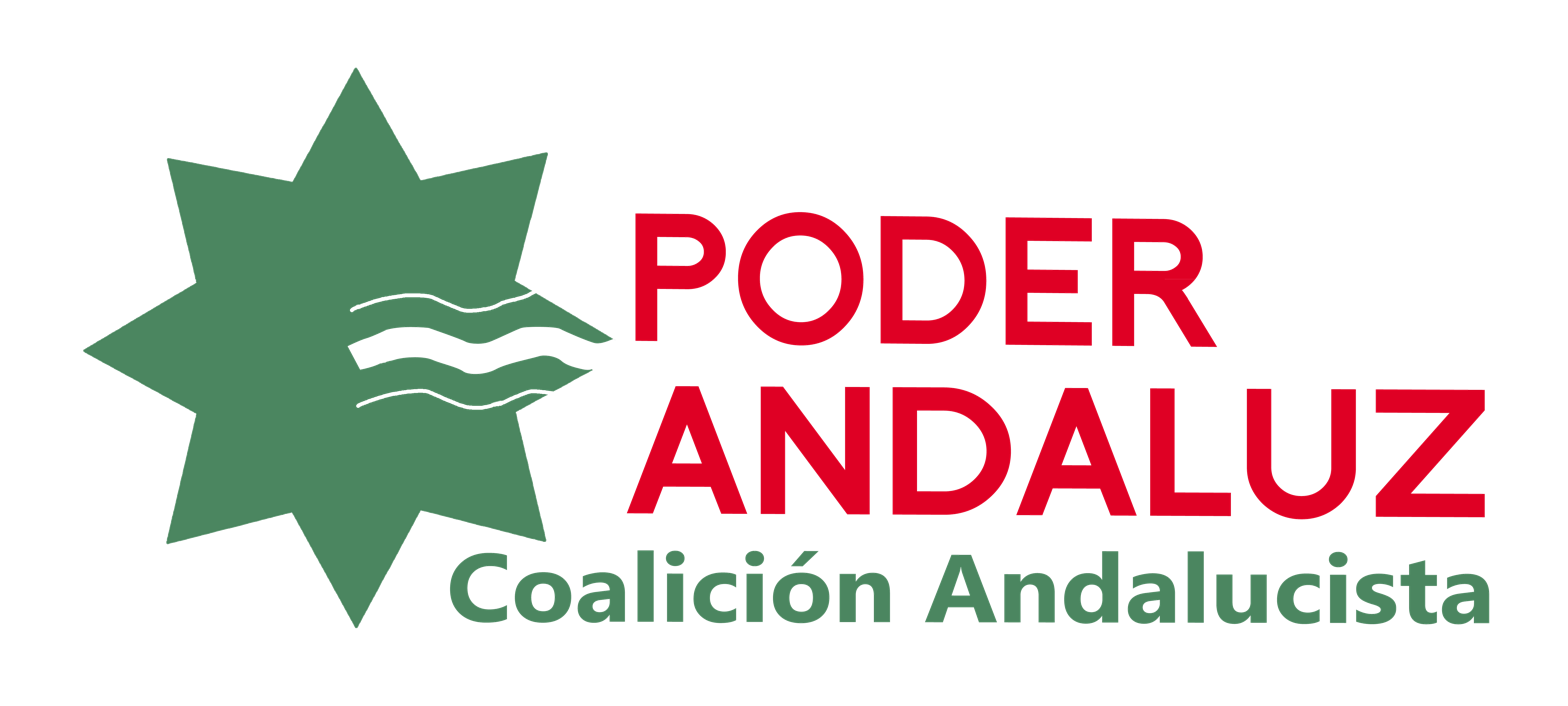
- Founded: 1994
- Dissolved: 1994
- Ideology: Andalusian nationalism
- Political position: Left-wing

Andalusian Coalition–Andalusian Power (Spanish: Coalición Andalucista–Poder Andaluz) was an Andalusian electoral alliance created for the 1994 European Parliament and Andalusian regional elections. It was composed by the Andalusian Party and the Andalusian Progress Party.

== Composition ==
Party
Andalusian Party (PA)
Andalusian Progress Party (PAP)
