= Forum (Spanish political party) =

Defunct political party in Spain

Forum Foro
- Leader: Eduard Punset
- Founded: December 1991
- Dissolved: March 1995
- Ideology: Centrism; Liberalism
- Political position: Centre
- International affiliation: Liberal International

Forum (Spanish: Foro) was a centrist, liberal political party in Spain, founded in 1991 by Eduard Punset.
