= Results of the 2008 Spanish Congress election =

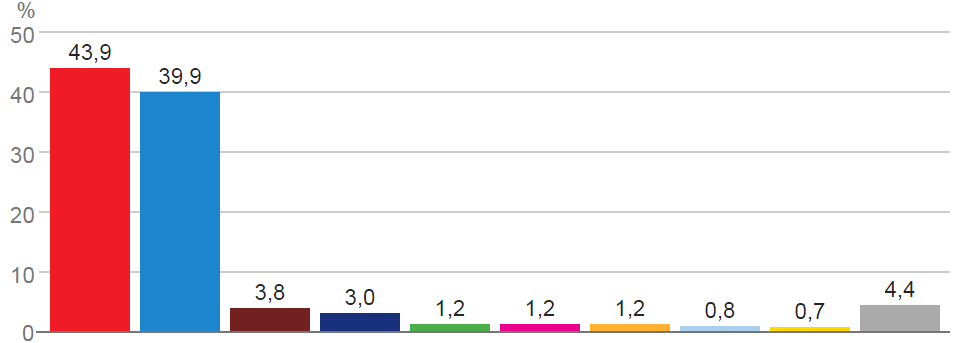
(Spain)	Main: 2008 Spanish general election
← 2004 9 March 2008 2011 →
Party		Votes	%	Seats
	PSOE	11,289,335	43.9%	169
	PP	10,278,010	39.9%	154
	IU	969,946	3.8%	2
	CiU	779,425	3.0%	10
	EAJ/PNV	306,128	1.2%	6
	UPyD	306,079	1.2%	1
	esquerra	298,139	1.2%	3
	BNG	212,543	0.8%	2
	CC–PNC	174,629	0.7%	2
	Others	1,120,629	4.4%	1
Total		25,734,863	100.0%	350

This article presents the results breakdown of the election to the Congress of Deputies held in Spain on 9 March 2008. The following tables show detailed results in each of the country's 17 autonomous communities and in the autonomous cities of Ceuta and Melilla, as well as a summary of constituency and regional results.

== Nationwide ==
← Summary of the 9 March 2008 Congress of Deputies election results →
Parties and alliances	Popular vote			Seats	
Parties and alliances	Votes	%	±pp	Total	+/−
Spanish Socialist Workers' Party (PSOE)	11,289,335	43.87	+1.28	169	+5
People's Party (PP)	10,278,010	39.94	+2.23	154	+6
United Left (IU)	969,946	3.77	−1.19	2	−3
Convergence and Union (CiU)	779,425	3.03	−0.20	10	±0
Basque Nationalist Party (EAJ/PNV)	306,128	1.19	−0.44	6	−1
Union, Progress and Democracy (UPyD)	306,079	1.19	New	1	+1
Republican Left of Catalonia (esquerra)	298,139	1.16	−1.36	3	−5
Galician Nationalist Bloc (BNG)	212,543	0.83	+0.02	2	±0
Canarian Coalition–Canarian Nationalist Party (CC–PNC)^{1}	174,629	0.68	−0.25	2	−1
Andalusian Coalition (CA)^{2}	68,679	0.27	−0.52	0	±0
Navarre Yes (NaBai)	62,398	0.24	±0.00	1	±0
Basque Solidarity (EA)	50,371	0.20	−0.11	0	−1
The Greens (Verdes)	49,355	0.19	−0.01	0	±0
The Greens (Verdes)	41,531	0.16	+0.10	0	±0
The Greens (EV–LV)^{3}	7,824	0.03	−0.11	0	±0
Citizens–Party of the Citizenry (C's)	46,313	0.18	New	0	±0
Anti-Bullfighting Party Against Mistreatment of Animals (PACMA)	44,795	0.17	New	0	±0
Aragonese Party (PAR)	40,054	0.16	+0.02	0	±0
Aragonese Union (CHA)	38,202	0.15	−0.21	0	−1
New Canaries–Canarian Centre (NC–CCN)	38,024	0.15	New	0	±0
The Greens–Green Group (LV–GV)	30,840	0.12	+0.07	0	±0
Aralar (Aralar)	29,989	0.12	−0.03	0	±0
Bloc–Initiative–Greens (Bloc–IdPV–EVEE)	29,760	0.12	−0.04	0	±0
Unity for the Isles (UIB)^{4}	25,454	0.10	n/a	0	±0
For a Fairer World (PUM+J)	23,318	0.09	New	0	±0
The Greens of Europe (LVdE)^{5}	20,419	0.08	±0.00	0	±0
Social Democratic Party (PSD)	20,126	0.08	New	0	±0
Communist Party of the Peoples of Spain (PCPE)	20,030	0.08	+0.03	0	±0
Citizens for Blank Votes (CenB)	14,193	0.06	−0.10	0	±0
Spanish Phalanx of the CNSO (FE de las JONS)	14,023	0.05	±0.00	0	±0
National Democracy (DN)	12,836	0.05	−0.01	0	±0
The Greens–The Ecologist Alternative (EV–AE)	12,561	0.05	−0.07	0	±0
Family and Life Party (PFyV)	9,882	0.04	−0.02	0	±0
Humanist Party (PH)	9,056	0.04	−0.04	0	±0
Party of Almería (PdeAL)	8,451	0.03	New	0	±0
Navarrese Cannabis Representation (RCN/NOK)	7,769	0.03	−0.04	0	±0
Internationalist Socialist Workers' Party (POSI)	7,386	0.03	±0.00	0	±0
Spanish Alternative (AES)	7,300	0.03	New	0	±0
Spain 2000 (E–2000)	6,906	0.03	+0.01	0	±0
Catalan Republican Party (RC)	6,746	0.03	New	0	±0
Valencian Coalition (CVa)	5,424	0.02	New	0	±0
Unsubmissive Seats–Alternative of Discontented Democrats (Ei–ADD)	5,035	0.02	+0.01	0	±0
Commoners' Land (TC)	4,796	0.02	−0.01	0	±0
Authentic Phalanx (FA)	4,607	0.02	±0.00	0	±0
Leonese People's Union (UPL)	4,509	0.02	−0.03	0	±0
Internationalist Solidarity and Self-Management (SAIn)	3,885	0.02	New	0	±0
Engine and Sports Alternative (AMD)	3,829	0.01	New	0	±0
Pensioners in Action Party (PDLPEA)	3,050	0.01	New	0	±0
Republican Left (IR)	2,899	0.01	−0.06	0	±0
Riojan Party (PR)	2,837	0.01	New	0	±0
National Alliance (AN)	2,737	0.01	+0.01	0	±0
Alternative in Blank (ABLA)	2,460	0.01	New	0	±0
United Extremadura (EU)	2,346	0.01	−0.01	0	±0
The Greens–Green Alternative (EV–AV)	2,028	0.01	±0.00	0	±0
Carlist Party (PC)	1,956	0.01	±0.00	0	±0
Party for Catalonia (PxCat)	1,919	0.01	New	0	±0
Non-Smokers' Party (PNF)	1,616	0.01	New	0	±0
Union for Leganés (ULEG)	1,566	0.01	New	0	±0
Spanish Front (Frente)	1,539	0.01	New	0	±0
Liberal Democratic Centre (CDL)	1,503	0.01	New	0	±0
Valencian Nationalist Option (ONV)	1,490	0.01	New	0	±0
Democratic and Social Centre (CDS)	1,362	0.01	−0.12	0	±0
Andecha Astur (AA)	1,299	0.01	±0.00	0	±0
Regionalist Party of the Leonese Country (PREPAL)	1,278	0.00	−0.01	0	±0
Spanish Democratic Centre (CDEs)	1,047	0.00	New	0	±0
Canarian Nationalist Alternative (ANC)	1,017	0.00	New	0	±0
Civil Liberties Party (PLCI)	888	0.00	New	0	±0
Unity (Unidá)	848	0.00	New	0	±0
Liberal Party of State Employment and Housing (PLEVE)	786	0.00	New	0	±0
Internationalist Struggle (LI (LIT–CI))	722	0.00	±0.00	0	±0
Unity of the People (UP)	699	0.00	New	0	±0
For the Valencian Republic (plRV)	645	0.00	New	0	±0
Centrist Party (PCTR)	509	0.00	New	0	±0
Movement for the Unity of the Canarian People (MUPC)	497	0.00	New	0	±0
Aragon United Citizens Party (pCUA)	475	0.00	New	0	±0
Citizens' Union–Independent Progressives of Canaries (UC–PIC)	464	0.00	New	0	±0
Kingdom of Valencia Identity (IRV)	449	0.00	−0.01	0	±0
Regionalist Unity of Castile and León (URCL)	423	0.00	New	0	±0
State of Spain Unionist Party (PUEDE)	414	0.00	New	0	±0
People of El Bierzo (PB–UB)	385	0.00	New	0	±0
Islander Party of the Balearic Islands (PIIB)	360	0.00	New	0	±0
Christian Positivist Party (PPCr)	300	0.00	±0.00	0	±0
Carlist Traditionalist Communion (CTC)	218	0.00	New	0	±0
Asturian Democratic Convergence (CDAS)	216	0.00	New	0	±0
Merindades of Castile Initiative (IMC)	202	0.00	New	0	±0
Castilian Unity (UdCa)	198	0.00	±0.00	0	±0
European Ibero-American Alliance Party (PAIE)	174	0.00	New	0	±0
Workers for Democracy Coalition (TD)	159	0.00	±0.00	0	±0
Regionalist Party of Guadalajara (PRGU)	152	0.00	±0.00	0	±0
Balearic Alliance (ABA)	145	0.00	New	0	±0
Electronic Voting Assembly (AVE)	144	0.00	New	0	±0
Liberal Centrist Union (UCL)	124	0.00	±0.00	0	±0
Alliance for Burgos (AxB)	123	0.00	New	0	±0
Burgalese Citizen Initiative (ICBur)	109	0.00	New	0	±0
We Are (N Som)	105	0.00	New	0	±0
Independents for Cuenca (ixC)	100	0.00	New	0	±0
Citizens' Group (AGRUCI)	79	0.00	New	0	±0
Falangist Movement of Spain (MFE)	68	0.00	New	0	±0
Aitch Party (PHache)	0	0.00	New	0	±0
Blank ballots	286,182	1.11	−0.47		
Total	25,734,863			350	±0
Valid votes	25,734,863	99.36	+0.37		
Invalid votes	165,576	0.64	−0.37		
Votes cast / turnout	25,900,439	73.85	−1.81		
Abstentions	9,172,740	26.15	+1.81		
Registered voters	35,073,179				
Sources
Footnotes: ^{1} Canarian Coalition–Canarian Nationalist Party results are compared to the combined totals of Canarian Coalition and the Canarian Nationalist Party in the 2004 election.; ^{2} Andalusian Coalition results are compared to the combined totals of Andalusian Party and Socialist Party of Andalusia in the 2004 election.; ^{3} The Greens results are compared to The Eco-pacifist Greens totals in the 2004 election.; ^{4} Within the Progressives for the Balearic Islands alliance in the 2004 election.; ^{5} The Greens of Europe results are compared to The Greens of the Community of Madrid totals in the 2004 election.

== Summary ==
=== Constituencies ===

Summary of constituency results in the 9 March 2008 Congress of Deputies election
Constituency	PSOE		PP		IU		CiU		PNV		UPyD		esquerra		BNG		CC–PNC		NaBai	
Constituency	%	S	%	S	%	S	%	S	%	S	%	S	%	S	%	S	%	S	%	S
A Coruña	41.0	3	42.7	4	1.6	−					0.6	−			12.0	1				
Álava	40.7	2	26.5	1	4.2	−			18.7	1	1.2	−								
Albacete	45.7	2	47.4	2	3.4	−					1.3	−								
Alicante	41.1	5	52.4	7	2.3	−					0.7	−	0.2	−						
Almería	42.0	3	49.9	3	2.7	−					0.5	−								
Asturias	46.9	4	41.6	4	7.2	−					1.4	−								
Ávila	35.0	1	58.6	2	2.6	−					1.4	−								
Badajoz	52.3	3	41.8	3	3.1	−					0.8	−								
Balearic Islands	44.2	4	44.0	4	2.8	−					0.7	−								
Barcelona	46.8	16	16.8	6	5.6	1	19.6	6			0.2	−	6.6	2						
Biscay	37.0	4	18.4	1	4.4	−			31.1	3	1.0	−								
Burgos	40.5	2	50.5	2	2.9	−					2.1	−								
Cáceres	52.2	2	41.9	2	2.7	−					0.8	−								
Cádiz	51.1	5	38.2	4	4.8	−					0.9	−								
Cantabria	43.6	2	50.0	3	2.3	−					1.4	−								
Castellón	44.2	2	49.0	3	2.1	−					0.6	−	0.3	−						
Ceuta	40.5	−	55.1	1	0.7	−					1.3	−								
Ciudad Real	46.8	2	47.8	3	2.6	−					0.8	−								
Córdoba	50.8	4	37.6	2	7.0	−					0.6	−								
Cuenca	45.2	1	49.8	2	2.4	−					0.8	−								
Girona	39.5	3	12.2	−	3.2	−	27.2	2			0.1	−	13.2	1						
Granada	50.0	4	41.1	3	5.0	−					1.0	−								
Guadalajara	41.0	1	50.7	2	3.3	−					2.1	−								
Guipúzcoa	39.0	3	14.6	1	4.8	−			23.8	2	0.9	−								
Huelva	55.7	3	35.0	2	4.9	−					0.9	−								
Huesca	47.6	2	37.6	1	2.9	−					1.3	−								
Jaén	55.5	4	36.5	2	4.8	−					0.5	−								
La Rioja	43.6	2	49.5	2	1.9	−					1.3	−								
Las Palmas	42.6	4	39.7	4	1.1	−					0.4	−					6.1	−		
León	50.1	3	43.3	2	2.1	−					0.8	−								
Lleida	37.2	2	15.0	1	2.6	−	28.6	1			0.1	−	12.9	−						
Lugo	41.4	2	44.5	2	1.0	−					0.5	−			10.8	−				
Madrid	39.7	15	49.2	18	4.7	1					3.7	1								
Málaga	47.0	5	43.0	5	5.1	−					1.0	−								
Melilla	48.1	−	49.0	1							1.1	−								
Murcia	32.9	3	61.2	7	2.9	−					0.9	−								
Navarre	34.8	2	39.2	2	3.3	−					0.8	−							18.4	1
Ourense	39.0	2	47.3	2	0.7	−					0.5	−			10.8	−				
Palencia	43.6	1	49.7	2	2.6	−					1.3	−								
Pontevedra	40.5	3	43.7	3	1.6	−					0.5	−			11.5	1				
Salamanca	40.0	2	53.8	2	1.7	−					1.7	−								
Santa Cruz de Tenerife	36.5	3	30.2	2	1.4	−					0.4	−					29.2	2		
Segovia	39.0	1	53.4	2	2.7	−					1.6	−								
Seville	58.1	8	31.5	4	5.4	−					1.2	−								
Soria	42.6	1	49.8	1	2.2	−					2.0	−								
Tarragona	44.9	4	17.8	1	3.0	−	21.1	1			0.1	−	9.4	−						
Teruel	44.5	2	39.6	1	2.6	−					0.4	−								
Toledo	43.0	3	51.2	3	3.0	−					1.0	−								
Valencia	40.2	7	51.6	9	3.1	−					0.7	−	0.2	−						
Valladolid	42.6	2	49.3	3	3.2	−					2.0	−								
Zamora	42.8	1	51.4	2	2.3	−					0.9	−								
Zaragoza	46.4	4	36.5	3	2.9	−					1.2	−								
Total	43.9	169	39.9	154	3.8	2	3.0	10	1.2	6	1.2	1	1.2	3	0.8	2	0.7	2	0.2	1

=== Regions ===

Summary of regional results in the 9 March 2008 Congress of Deputies election
Region	PSOE		PP		IU		CiU		PNV		UPyD		esquerra		BNG		CC–PNC		NaBai	
Region	%	S	%	S	%	S	%	S	%	S	%	S	%	S	%	S	%	S	%	S
Andalusia	51.9	36	38.2	25	5.1	−					0.9	−								
Aragon	46.4	8	37.0	5	2.8	−					1.1	−								
Asturias	46.9	4	41.6	4	7.2	−					1.4	−								
Balearic Islands	44.2	4	44.0	4	2.8	−					0.7	−								
Basque Country	38.1	9	18.5	3	4.5	−			27.1	6	0.9	−								
Canary Islands	39.6	7	35.0	6	1.2	−					0.4	−					17.5	2		
Cantabria	43.6	2	50.0	3	2.3	−					1.4	−								
Castile and León	42.8	14	50.0	18	2.5	−					1.5	−								
Castilla–La Mancha	44.5	9	49.4	12	2.9	−					1.1	−								
Catalonia	45.4	25	16.4	8	4.9	1	20.9	10			0.2	−	7.8	3						
Ceuta	40.5	−	55.1	1	0.7	−					1.3	−								
Extremadura	52.3	5	41.8	5	2.9	−					0.8	−								
Galicia	40.6	10	43.9	11	1.4	−					0.5	−			11.5	2				
La Rioja	43.6	2	49.5	2	1.9	−					1.3	−								
Madrid	39.7	15	49.2	18	4.7	1					3.7	1								
Melilla	48.1	−	49.0	1							1.1	−								
Murcia	32.9	3	61.2	7	2.9	−					0.9	−								
Navarre	34.8	2	39.2	2	3.3	−					0.8	−							18.4	1
Valencian Community	41.0	14	51.6	19	2.7	–					0.7	–	0.2	–						
Total	43.9	169	39.9	154	3.8	2	3.0	10	1.2	6	1.2	1	1.2	3	0.8	2	0.7	2	0.2	1

== Autonomous communities ==
=== Andalusia ===
← Summary of the 9 March 2008 Congress of Deputies election results in Andalusia →
Parties and alliances	Popular vote			Seats	
Parties and alliances	Votes	%	±pp	Total	+/−
Spanish Socialist Workers' Party (PSOE)	2,342,277	51.93	−0.93	36	−2
People's Party (PP)	1,721,824	38.18	+4.49	25	+2
United Left/The Greens–Assembly for Andalusia–Alternative (IULV–CA)	230,335	5.11	−1.28	0	±0
Andalusian Coalition (CA)^{1}	68,679	1.52	−3.06	0	±0
Union, Progress and Democracy (UPyD)	40,568	0.90	New	0	±0
The Greens (Verdes)	14,294	0.32	New	0	±0
Party of Almería (PdeAL)	8,451	0.19	New	0	±0
Anti-Bullfighting Party Against Mistreatment of Animals (PACMA)	6,910	0.15	New	0	±0
Social Democratic Party (PSD)	4,308	0.10	New	0	±0
For a Fairer World (PUM+J)	4,081	0.09	New	0	±0
Citizens–Party of the Citizenry (C's)	3,849	0.09	New	0	±0
Communist Party of the Peoples of Spain (PCPE)	3,551	0.08	+0.07	0	±0
Spanish Phalanx of the CNSO (FE de las JONS)	1,949	0.04	−0.01	0	±0
Family and Life Party (PFyV)	1,836	0.04	−0.02	0	±0
Humanist Party (PH)	1,799	0.04	−0.05	0	±0
National Democracy (DN)	1,784	0.04	±0.00	0	±0
Spanish Alternative (AES)	1,515	0.03	New	0	±0
Internationalist Solidarity and Self-Management (SAIn)	1,386	0.03	New	0	±0
Navarrese Cannabis Representation (RCN/NOK)	1,155	0.03	New	0	±0
Internationalist Socialist Workers' Party (POSI)	1,058	0.02	New	0	±0
Authentic Phalanx (FA)	777	0.02	+0.01	0	±0
Spain 2000 (E–2000)	680	0.02	+0.01	0	±0
Citizens for Blank Votes (CenB)	520	0.01	−0.14	0	±0
National Alliance (AN)	466	0.01	New	0	±0
Engine and Sports Alternative (AMD)	356	0.01	New	0	±0
Christian Positivist Party (PPCr)	300	0.01	−0.01	0	±0
Spanish Front (Frente)	241	0.01	New	0	±0
Democratic and Social Centre (CDS)	114	0.00	−0.07	0	±0
Blank ballots	45,124	1.00	−0.65		
Total	4,510,187			61	±0
Valid votes	4,510,187	99.42	+0.03		
Invalid votes	26,212	0.58	−0.03		
Votes cast / turnout	4,536,399	72.77	−2.00		
Abstentions	1,697,889	27.23	+2.00		
Registered voters	6,234,288				
Sources
Footnotes: ^{1} Andalusian Coalition results are compared to the combined totals of Andalusian Party and Socialist Party of Andalusia in the 2004 election.

=== Aragon ===
← Summary of the 9 March 2008 Congress of Deputies election results in Aragon →
Parties and alliances	Popular vote			Seats	
Parties and alliances	Votes	%	±pp	Total	+/−
Spanish Socialist Workers' Party (PSOE)	356,050	46.39	+5.11	8	+1
People's Party (PP)	284,068	37.01	+0.53	5	±0
Aragonese Party (PAR)	40,054	5.22	+0.54	0	±0
Aragonese Union (CHA)	38,202	4.98	−7.09	0	−1
United Left (IU)	21,816	2.84	+0.04	0	±0
Union, Progress and Democracy (UPyD)	8,728	1.14	New	0	±0
The Greens–Green Group (LV–GV)	2,489	0.32	New	0	±0
Anti-Bullfighting Party Against Mistreatment of Animals (PACMA)	1,230	0.16	New	0	±0
Citizens–Party of the Citizenry (C's)	997	0.13	New	0	±0
Citizens for Blank Votes (CenB)	545	0.07	−0.06	0	±0
For a Fairer World (PUM+J)	497	0.06	New	0	±0
Aragon United Citizens Party (pCUA)	475	0.06	New	0	±0
National Democracy (DN)	433	0.06	−0.01	0	±0
Social Democratic Party–Federation of Independents of Aragon (PSD–FIA)	395	0.05	New	0	±0
Spanish Phalanx of the CNSO (FE de las JONS)	352	0.05	+0.01	0	±0
Family and Life Party (PFyV)	330	0.04	−0.05	0	±0
Communist Party of the Peoples of Spain (PCPE)	314	0.04	+0.02	0	±0
National Alliance (AN)	244	0.03	New	0	±0
Authentic Phalanx (FA)	190	0.02	±0.00	0	±0
Humanist Party (PH)	121	0.02	−0.03	0	±0
Spanish Alternative (AES)	118	0.02	New	0	±0
Spanish Front (Frente)	113	0.01	New	0	±0
Spain 2000 (E–2000)	89	0.01	New	0	±0
Centrist Party (PCTR)	10	0.00	New	0	±0
Blank ballots	9,620	1.25	−0.76		
Total	767,480			13	±0
Valid votes	767,480	99.46	+0.06		
Invalid votes	4,153	0.54	−0.06		
Votes cast / turnout	771,633	75.92	−1.12		
Abstentions	244,787	24.08	+1.12		
Registered voters	1,016,420				

=== Asturias ===
← Summary of the 9 March 2008 Congress of Deputies election results in Asturias →
Parties and alliances	Popular vote			Seats	
Parties and alliances	Votes	%	±pp	Total	+/−
Spanish Socialist Workers' Party (PSOE)	326,477	46.93	+3.55	4	±0
People's Party (PP)	289,305	41.58	−2.19	4	±0
United Left–Bloc for Asturias–The Greens (IU–BA–LV)	49,936	7.18	−1.24	0	±0
Union, Progress and Democracy (UPyD)	9,485	1.36	New	0	±0
The Greens–Green Group (LV–GV)	1,906	0.27	New	0	±0
Andecha Astur (AA)	1,299	0.19	−0.09	0	±0
Anti-Bullfighting Party Against Mistreatment of Animals (PACMA)	1,193	0.17	New	0	±0
Communist Party of the Peoples of Spain (PCPE)	946	0.14	+0.03	0	±0
Unity (Unidá)	848	0.12	New	0	±0
Social Democratic Party (PSD)	778	0.11	New	0	±0
Citizens for Blank Votes (CenB)	617	0.09	−0.10	0	±0
Citizens–Party of the Citizenry (C's)	575	0.08	New	0	±0
National Democracy (DN)	549	0.08	+0.04	0	±0
Republican Left (IR)	529	0.08	+0.03	0	±0
For a Fairer World (PUM+J)	446	0.06	New	0	±0
Engine and Sports Alternative (AMD)	369	0.05	New	0	±0
Internationalist Socialist Workers' Party (POSI)	262	0.04	New	0	±0
Internationalist Solidarity and Self-Management (SAIn)	250	0.04	New	0	±0
Spanish Phalanx of the CNSO (FE de las JONS)	237	0.03	−0.01	0	±0
Asturian Democratic Convergence (CDAS)	216	0.03	−0.05	0	±0
Family and Life Party (PFyV)	159	0.02	New	0	±0
Humanist Party (PH)	151	0.02	−0.04	0	±0
State of Spain Unionist Party (PUEDE)	117	0.02	New	0	±0
Spanish Alternative (AES)	98	0.01	New	0	±0
Authentic Phalanx (FA)	90	0.01	−0.02	0	±0
Spanish Front (Frente)	75	0.01	New	0	±0
Falangist Movement of Spain (MFE)	68	0.01	New	0	±0
National Alliance (AN)	67	0.01	New	0	±0
Carlist Party (PC)	57	0.01	New	0	±0
Blank ballots	8,630	1.24	−0.81		
Total	695,735			8	±0
Valid votes	695,735	99.35	−0.10		
Invalid votes	4,533	0.65	+0.10		
Votes cast / turnout	700,268	71.29	−0.44		
Abstentions	281,962	28.71	+0.44		
Registered voters	982,230				

=== Balearic Islands ===
← Summary of the 9 March 2008 Congress of Deputies election results in the Balearic Islands →
Parties and alliances	Popular vote			Seats	
Parties and alliances	Votes	%	±pp	Total	+/−
Spanish Socialist Workers' Party (PSOE)	209,451	44.23	+4.75	4	±0
People's Party (PP)	208,246	43.97	−1.92	4	±0
Unity for the Isles (UIB)^{1}	25,454	5.37	n/a	0	±0
United Left–The Greens (EU–EV)^{1}	13,447	2.84	n/a	0	±0
Union, Progress and Democracy (UPyD)	3,107	0.66	New	0	±0
The Greens–Green Group (LV–GV)	2,098	0.44	New	0	±0
Anti-Bullfighting Party Against Mistreatment of Animals (PACMA)	1,173	0.25	New	0	±0
Citizens for Blank Votes (CenB)	1,010	0.21	−0.13	0	±0
Citizens–Party of the Citizenry (C's)	723	0.15	New	0	±0
For a Fairer World (PUM+J)	425	0.09	New	0	±0
Communist Party of the Peoples of Spain (PCPE)	415	0.09	New	0	±0
Islander Party of the Balearic Islands (PIIB)	360	0.08	New	0	±0
Spanish Phalanx of the CNSO (FE de las JONS)	334	0.07	±0.00	0	±0
Family and Life Party (PFyV)	284	0.06	New	0	±0
National Democracy (DN)	250	0.05	±0.00	0	±0
Humanist Party (PH)	206	0.04	New	0	±0
Workers for Democracy Coalition (TD)	159	0.03	−0.06	0	±0
Authentic Phalanx (FA)	158	0.03	New	0	±0
Balearic Alliance (ABA)	145	0.03	New	0	±0
Spanish Alternative (AES)	112	0.02	New	0	±0
Blank ballots	6,026	1.27	−0.66		
Total	473,583			8	±0
Valid votes	473,583	99.15	−0.14		
Invalid votes	4,079	0.85	+0.14		
Votes cast / turnout	477,662	67.57	−1.27		
Abstentions	229,276	32.43	+1.27		
Registered voters	706,938				
Sources
Footnotes: ^{1} Within the Progressives for the Balearic Islands alliance in the 2004 election.

=== Basque Country ===
← Summary of the 9 March 2008 Congress of Deputies election results in the Basque Country →
Parties and alliances	Popular vote			Seats	
Parties and alliances	Votes	%	±pp	Total	+/−
Socialist Party of the Basque Country–Basque Country Left (PSE–EE (PSOE))	430,690	38.14	+10.92	9	+2
Basque Nationalist Party (EAJ/PNV)	306,128	27.11	−6.61	6	−1
People's Party (PP)	209,244	18.53	−0.36	3	−1
United Left–Greens–Alternative (EB–B)	50,403	4.46	−3.74	0	±0
Basque Solidarity (EA)	50,371	4.46	−2.02	0	−1
Aralar (Aralar)	29,989	2.66	−0.43	0	±0
Union, Progress and Democracy (UPyD)	10,636	0.94	New	0	±0
The Greens (B/LV)	6,434	0.57	New	0	±0
Anti-Bullfighting Party Against Mistreatment of Animals (PACMA)	4,237	0.38	New	0	±0
For a Fairer World (PUM+J)	2,770	0.25	New	0	±0
Internationalist Socialist Workers' Party (POSI)	1,325	0.12	−0.01	0	±0
Engine and Sports Alternative (AMD)	1,207	0.11	New	0	±0
Communist Party of the Peoples of Spain–Basque Communists (PCPE–EK)	1,053	0.09	New	0	±0
Family and Life Party (PFyV)	1,011	0.09	New	0	±0
Humanist Party (PH)	797	0.07	−0.25	0	±0
Citizens–Party of the Citizenry (C's)	772	0.07	New	0	±0
Carlist Party of the Basque Country–Carlist Party (EKA–PC)	464	0.04	±0.00	0	±0
National Democracy (DN)	385	0.03	−0.03	0	±0
Spanish Phalanx of the CNSO (FE de las JONS)	361	0.03	±0.00	0	±0
Spanish Alternative (AES)	205	0.02	New	0	±0
National Alliance (AN)	113	0.01	New	0	±0
Liberal Centrist Union (UCL)	44	0.00	New	0	±0
Blank ballots	20,682	1.83	+0.48		
Total	1,129,321			18	−1
Valid votes	1,129,321	99.02	+6.71		
Invalid votes	11,190	0.98	−6.71		
Votes cast / turnout	1,140,511	64.03	−10.94		
Abstentions	640,629	35.97	+10.94		
Registered voters	1,781,140				

=== Canary Islands ===
← Summary of the 9 March 2008 Congress of Deputies election results in the Canary Islands →
Parties and alliances	Popular vote			Seats	
Parties and alliances	Votes	%	±pp	Total	+/−
Spanish Socialist Workers' Party (PSOE)	395,182	39.57	+5.12	7	+1
People's Party (PP)	349,568	35.00	−0.44	6	±0
Canarian Coalition–Canarian Nationalist Party (CC–PNC)^{1}	174,629	17.49	−7.26	2	−1
New Canaries–Canarian Centre (NC–CCN)	38,024	3.81	New	0	±0
Canarian United Left–Alternative (IUC)	12,472	1.25	−0.68	0	±0
The Greens (Verdes)	4,957	0.50	New	0	±0
Union, Progress and Democracy (UPyD)	3,577	0.36	New	0	±0
The Greens–Green Group (LV–GV)	2,718	0.27	−0.87	0	±0
Communist Party of the Canarian People (PCPC)	1,358	0.14	−0.02	0	±0
Canarian Nationalist Alternative (ANC)	1,017	0.10	New	0	±0
Social Democratic Party (PSD)	857	0.09	New	0	±0
For a Fairer World (PUM+J)	853	0.09	New	0	±0
Unity of the People (UP)	699	0.07	New	0	±0
Citizens for Blank Votes (CenB)	675	0.07	New	0	±0
Humanist Party (PH)	634	0.06	−0.03	0	±0
Anti-Bullfighting Party Against Mistreatment of Animals (PACMA)	631	0.06	New	0	±0
Movement for the Unity of the Canarian People (MUPC)	497	0.05	New	0	±0
Citizens' Union–Independent Progressives of Canaries (UC–PIC)	464	0.05	New	0	±0
National Democracy (DN)	418	0.04	−0.01	0	±0
Citizens–Party of the Citizenry (C's)	353	0.04	New	0	±0
Family and Life Party (PFyV)	350	0.04	New	0	±0
Spanish Alternative (AES)	348	0.03	New	0	±0
Spanish Phalanx of the CNSO (FE de las JONS)	299	0.03	−0.02	0	±0
Authentic Phalanx (FA)	243	0.02	−0.03	0	±0
Internationalist Solidarity and Self-Management (SAIn)	235	0.02	New	0	±0
Liberal Democratic Centre (CDL)	208	0.02	New	0	±0
Spanish Front (Frente)	85	0.01	New	0	±0
Blank ballots	7,336	0.73	−0.34		
Total	998,687			15	±0
Valid votes	998,687	99.34	−0.08		
Invalid votes	6,608	0.66	+0.08		
Votes cast / turnout	1,005,295	65.87	−0.83		
Abstentions	520,883	34.13	+0.83		
Registered voters	1,526,178				
Sources
Footnotes: ^{1} Canarian Coalition–Canarian Nationalist Party results are compared to the combined totals of Canarian Coalition and the Canarian Nationalist Party in the 2004 election.

=== Cantabria ===
← Summary of the 9 March 2008 Congress of Deputies election results in Cantabria →
Parties and alliances	Popular vote			Seats	
Parties and alliances	Votes	%	±pp	Total	+/−
People's Party (PP)	184,853	49.99	−1.91	3	±0
Spanish Socialist Workers' Party (PSOE)	161,279	43.61	+2.74	2	±0
United Left (IU)	8,395	2.27	−1.04	0	±0
Union, Progress and Democracy (UPyD)	5,094	1.38	New	0	±0
The Greens of Europe (LVdE)	1,060	0.29	New	0	±0
Anti-Bullfighting Party Against Mistreatment of Animals (PACMA)	713	0.19	New	0	±0
Communist Party of the Peoples of Spain (PCPE)	497	0.13	+0.01	0	±0
Social Democratic Party (PSD)	444	0.12	New	0	±0
Engine and Sports Alternative (AMD)	394	0.11	New	0	±0
For a Fairer World (PUM+J)	353	0.10	New	0	±0
Alternative in Blank (ABLA)	305	0.08	New	0	±0
Spanish Phalanx of the CNSO (FE de las JONS)	302	0.08	+0.02	0	±0
Citizens for Blank Votes (CenB)	297	0.08	−0.28	0	±0
Citizens–Party of the Citizenry (C's)	286	0.08	New	0	±0
Internationalist Solidarity and Self-Management (SAIn)	219	0.06	New	0	±0
Humanist Party (PH)	175	0.05	−0.14	0	±0
Family and Life Party (PFyV)	166	0.04	New	0	±0
Spanish Alternative (AES)	157	0.04	New	0	±0
National Democracy (DN)	154	0.04	−0.02	0	±0
Authentic Phalanx (FA)	112	0.03	−0.01	0	±0
Blank ballots	4,551	1.23	−1.02		
Total	369,806			5	±0
Valid votes	369,806	99.21	+0.09		
Invalid votes	2,926	0.79	−0.09		
Votes cast / turnout	372,732	76.38	−0.85		
Abstentions	115,277	23.62	+0.85		
Registered voters	488,009				

=== Castile and León ===
← Summary of the 9 March 2008 Congress of Deputies election results in Castile and León →
Parties and alliances	Popular vote			Seats	
Parties and alliances	Votes	%	±pp	Total	+/−
People's Party (PP)	836,228	50.01	−0.30	18	−1
Spanish Socialist Workers' Party (PSOE)	715,263	42.78	+0.88	14	±0
United Left–Alternative (IU)	41,964	2.51	−0.31	0	±0
Union, Progress and Democracy (UPyD)	25,504	1.53	New	0	±0
Leonese People's Union (UPL)	4,509	0.27	−0.57	0	±0
Commoners' Land (TC)	3,537	0.21	−0.20	0	±0
The Greens of Europe (LVdE)	3,209	0.19	New	0	±0
Anti-Bullfighting Party Against Mistreatment of Animals (PACMA)	2,440	0.15	New	0	±0
The Greens (Verdes)	2,022	0.12	New	0	±0
Citizens–Party of the Citizenry (C's)	2,010	0.12	New	0	±0
Social Democratic Party (PSD)	1,770	0.11	New	0	±0
For a Fairer World (PUM+J)	1,548	0.09	New	0	±0
The Greens–Green Group (LV–GV)	1,368	0.08	−0.01	0	±0
National Democracy (DN)	1,314	0.08	+0.04	0	±0
Communist Party of the Peoples of Spain (PCPE)	1,293	0.08	+0.03	0	±0
Spanish Phalanx of the CNSO (FE de las JONS)	1,151	0.07	+0.02	0	±0
Citizens for Blank Votes (CenB)	1,104	0.07	−0.15	0	±0
Regionalist Party of the Leonese Country (PREPAL)	1,028	0.06	−0.02	0	±0
Humanist Party (PH)	589	0.04	−0.04	0	±0
Regionalist Unity of Castile and León (URCL)	423	0.03	New	0	±0
Internationalist Solidarity and Self-Management (SAIn)	421	0.03	New	0	±0
Spanish Alternative (AES)	421	0.03	New	0	±0
People of El Bierzo (PB–UB)	385	0.02	New	0	±0
Authentic Phalanx (FA)	373	0.02	−0.01	0	±0
Carlist Party (PC)	313	0.02	+0.01	0	±0
Engine and Sports Alternative (AMD)	238	0.01	New	0	±0
Merindades of Castile Initiative (IMC)	202	0.01	New	0	±0
Family and Life Party (PFyV)	200	0.01	New	0	±0
Spain 2000 (E–2000)	176	0.01	±0.00	0	±0
National Alliance (AN)	157	0.01	New	0	±0
Centrist Party (PCTR)	134	0.01	New	0	±0
Spanish Front (Frente)	131	0.01	New	0	±0
Alliance for Burgos (AxB)	123	0.01	New	0	±0
Burgalese Citizen Initiative (ICBur)	109	0.01	New	0	±0
Alternative in Blank (ABLA)	97	0.01	New	0	±0
State of Spain Unionist Party (PUEDE)	83	0.00	New	0	±0
Liberal Centrist Union (UCL)	80	0.00	−0.01	0	±0
Citizens' Group (AGRUCI)	79	0.00	New	0	±0
Spanish Democratic Centre (CDEs)	52	0.00	New	0	±0
Carlist Traditionalist Communion (CTC)	18	0.00	New	0	±0
Blank ballots	20,023	1.20	−0.80		
Total	1,672,089			32	−1
Valid votes	1,672,089	99.27	+0.04		
Invalid votes	12,218	0.73	−0.04		
Votes cast / turnout	1,684,307	77.66	−0.15		
Abstentions	484,648	22.34	+0.15		
Registered voters	2,168,955				

=== Castilla–La Mancha ===
← Summary of the 9 March 2008 Congress of Deputies election results in Castilla–La Mancha →
Parties and alliances	Popular vote			Seats	
Parties and alliances	Votes	%	±pp	Total	+/−
People's Party (PP)	597,088	49.36	+1.96	12	+1
Spanish Socialist Workers' Party (PSOE)	538,402	44.51	−1.99	9	±0
United Left–Alternative (IU)	35,425	2.93	−0.44	0	±0
Union, Progress and Democracy (UPyD)	13,230	1.09	New	0	±0
The Greens of Europe (LVdE)	2,423	0.20	New	0	±0
Social Democratic Party (PSD)	1,303	0.11	New	0	±0
Anti-Bullfighting Party Against Mistreatment of Animals (PACMA)	1,104	0.09	New	0	±0
Citizens for Blank Votes (CenB)	1,064	0.09	−0.11	0	±0
For a Fairer World (PUM+J)	1,028	0.08	New	0	±0
The Greens–Green Group (LV–GV)	1,004	0.08	New	0	±0
Spanish Phalanx of the CNSO (FE de las JONS)	698	0.06	+0.02	0	±0
Communist Party of the Peoples of Spain (PCPE)	679	0.06	−0.01	0	±0
Citizens–Party of the Citizenry (C's)	671	0.06	New	0	±0
Commoners' Land (TC)	648	0.05	−0.04	0	±0
National Democracy (DN)	534	0.04	−0.02	0	±0
Humanist Party (PH)	521	0.04	−0.03	0	±0
Family and Life Party (PFyV)	414	0.03	−0.09	0	±0
Spanish Alternative (AES)	356	0.03	New	0	±0
Spain 2000 (E–2000)	262	0.02	New	0	±0
Authentic Phalanx (FA)	220	0.02	−0.01	0	±0
Castilian Unity (UdCa)	198	0.02	−0.03	0	±0
Spanish Democratic Centre (CDEs)	167	0.01	New	0	±0
Regionalist Party of Guadalajara (PRGU)	152	0.01	−0.02	0	±0
Independents for Cuenca (ixC)	100	0.01	New	0	±0
National Alliance (AN)	79	0.01	New	0	±0
Centrist Party (PCTR)	41	0.00	New	0	±0
Spanish Front (Frente)	39	0.00	New	0	±0
Carlist Traditionalist Communion (CTC)	28	0.00	New	0	±0
Blank ballots	11,673	0.97	−0.65		
Total	1,209,551			21	+1
Valid votes	1,209,551	99.26	+0.12		
Invalid votes	9,003	0.74	−0.12		
Votes cast / turnout	1,218,554	80.02	+0.12		
Abstentions	304,278	19.98	−0.12		
Registered voters	1,522,832				

=== Catalonia ===
← Summary of the 9 March 2008 Congress of Deputies election results in Catalonia →
Parties and alliances	Popular vote			Seats	
Parties and alliances	Votes	%	±pp	Total	+/−
Socialists' Party of Catalonia (PSC–PSOE)	1,689,911	45.39	+5.92	25	+4
Convergence and Union (CiU)	779,425	20.93	+0.15	10	±0
People's Party (PP)	610,473	16.40	+0.82	8	+2
Republican Left of Catalonia (esquerra)	291,532	7.83	−8.06	3	−5
Initiative for Catalonia Greens–United and Alternative Left (ICV–EUiA)	183,338	4.92	−0.92	1	−1
Citizens–Party of the Citizenry (C's)	27,512	0.74	New	0	±0
The Greens–The Ecologist Alternative (EV–AE)	12,561	0.34	−0.42	0	±0
Anti-Bullfighting Party Against Mistreatment of Animals (PACMA)	10,686	0.29	New	0	±0
The Greens (EV–LV)	7,324	0.20	New	0	±0
Catalan Republican Party (RC)	6,746	0.18	New	0	±0
Union, Progress and Democracy (UPyD)	6,252	0.17	New	0	±0
Unsubmissive Seats–Alternative of Discontented Democrats (Ei–ADD)	5,035	0.14	+0.08	0	±0
Communist Party of the Catalan People (PCPC)	4,225	0.11	+0.05	0	±0
Citizens for Blank Votes (CenB)	3,512	0.09	±0.00	0	±0
Pensioners in Action Party (PDLPEA)	3,050	0.08	New	0	±0
Internationalist Socialist Workers' Party (POSI)	2,830	0.08	New	0	±0
Republican Left–Left Republican Party (IR–PRE)	2,370	0.06	−0.02	0	±0
For a Fairer World (PUM+J)	2,339	0.06	New	0	±0
The Greens–Green Alternative (EV–AV)	2,028	0.05	±0.00	0	±0
Party for Catalonia (PxCat)	1,919	0.05	New	0	±0
National Democracy (DN)	1,788	0.05	+0.02	0	±0
Family and Life Party (PFiV)	1,658	0.04	±0.00	0	±0
Spanish Phalanx of the CNSO (FE de las JONS)	1,593	0.04	±0.00	0	±0
Engine and Sports Alternative (AMD)	1,265	0.03	New	0	±0
Social Democratic Party (PSD)	1,103	0.03	New	0	±0
Humanist Party (PH)	944	0.03	−0.01	0	±0
Spain 2000 (E–2000)	728	0.02	+0.02	0	±0
Civil Liberties Party (PLCI)	676	0.02	New	0	±0
Spanish Alternative (AES)	657	0.02	New	0	±0
Authentic Phalanx (FA)	647	0.02	New	0	±0
Internationalist Struggle (LI (LIT–CI))	539	0.01	±0.00	0	±0
National Alliance (AN)	530	0.01	New	0	±0
Carlist Party of Catalonia (PCdeC)	496	0.01	+0.01	0	±0
Internationalist Solidarity and Self-Management (SAIn)	293	0.01	New	0	±0
We Are (N Som)	105	0.00	New	0	±0
Spanish Front (Frente)	57	0.00	New	0	±0
Blank ballots	57,274	1.54	+0.65		
Total	3,723,421			47	±0
Valid votes	3,723,421	99.47	−0.21		
Invalid votes	19,939	0.53	+0.21		
Votes cast / turnout	3,743,360	70.30	−5.66		
Abstentions	1,581,549	29.70	+5.66		
Registered voters	5,324,909				

=== Extremadura ===
← Summary of the 9 March 2008 Congress of Deputies election results in Extremadura →
Parties and alliances	Popular vote			Seats	
Parties and alliances	Votes	%	±pp	Total	+/−
Spanish Socialist Workers' Party (PSOE)	365,752	52.29	+1.07	5	±0
People's Party (PP)	292,453	41.81	−0.58	5	±0
United Left–Alternative (IU)	20,606	2.95	−0.52	0	±0
Union, Progress and Democracy (UPyD)	5,366	0.77	New	0	±0
United Extremadura (EU)	2,346	0.34	−0.22	0	±0
The Greens (LV)	2,151	0.31	−0.14	0	±0
For a Fairer World (PUM+J)	947	0.14	New	0	±0
Anti-Bullfighting Party Against Mistreatment of Animals (PACMA)	844	0.12	New	0	±0
Communist Party of the Peoples of Spain (PCPE)	608	0.09	−0.04	0	±0
Citizens–Party of the Citizenry (C's)	459	0.07	New	0	±0
Social Democratic Party (PSD)	427	0.06	New	0	±0
Citizens for Blank Votes (CenB)	422	0.06	−0.05	0	±0
National Democracy (DN)	281	0.04	±0.00	0	±0
Spanish Phalanx of the CNSO (FE de las JONS)	257	0.04	±0.00	0	±0
Humanist Party (PH)	182	0.03	−0.01	0	±0
Authentic Phalanx (FA)	173	0.02	−0.01	0	±0
Spanish Alternative (AES)	119	0.02	New	0	±0
Spain 2000 (E–2000)	88	0.01	New	0	±0
Family and Life Party (PFyV)	82	0.01	−0.04	0	±0
National Alliance (AN)	51	0.01	New	0	±0
Carlist Traditionalist Communion (CTC)	26	0.00	New	0	±0
Blank ballots	5,840	0.83	−0.45		
Total	699,480			10	±0
Valid votes	699,480	99.31	+0.05		
Invalid votes	4,843	0.69	−0.05		
Votes cast / turnout	704,323	78.55	−0.71		
Abstentions	192,360	21.45	+0.71		
Registered voters	896,683				

=== Galicia ===
← Summary of the 9 March 2008 Congress of Deputies election results in Galicia →
Parties and alliances	Popular vote			Seats	
Parties and alliances	Votes	%	±pp	Total	+/−
People's Party (PP)	809,879	43.86	−3.29	11	−1
Socialists' Party of Galicia (PSdeG–PSOE)	750,492	40.64	+3.45	10	±0
Galician Nationalist Bloc (BNG)	212,543	11.51	+0.14	2	±0
United Left–Alternative (EU–IU)	25,308	1.37	−0.37	0	±0
Union, Progress and Democracy (UPyD)	10,110	0.55	New	0	±0
The Greens of Europe (LVdE)	3,802	0.21	New	0	±0
Anti-Bullfighting Party Against Mistreatment of Animals (PACMA)	2,854	0.15	New	0	±0
Social Democratic Party (PSD)	2,596	0.14	New	0	±0
For a Fairer World (PUM+J)	2,172	0.12	New	0	±0
Citizens–Party of the Citizenry (C's)	1,131	0.06	New	0	±0
The Greens–Green Group (OV–GV)	1,030	0.06	+0.07	0	±0
Humanist Party (PH)	1,027	0.06	−0.09	0	±0
Spanish Phalanx of the CNSO (FE de las JONS)	1,001	0.05	+0.01	0	±0
Family and Life Party (PFyV)	891	0.05	New	0	±0
National Democracy (DN)	583	0.03	−0.03	0	±0
Communist Party of the Galician People (PCPG)	507	0.03	New	0	±0
Spanish Alternative (AES)	307	0.02	New	0	±0
Internationalist Solidarity and Self-Management (SAIn)	287	0.02	New	0	±0
Alternative in Blank (ABLA)	182	0.01	New	0	±0
Liberal Democratic Centre (CDL)	181	0.01	New	0	±0
Electronic Voting Assembly (AVE)	144	0.01	New	0	±0
Spanish Front (Frente)	114	0.01	New	0	±0
National Alliance (AN)	58	0.00	New	0	±0
Blank ballots	19,289	1.04	−0.53		
Total	1,846,488			23	−1
Valid votes	1,846,488	99.29	±0.00		
Invalid votes	13,266	0.71	±0.00		
Votes cast / turnout	1,859,754	70.48	−0.49		
Abstentions	779,062	29.52	+0.49		
Registered voters	2,638,816				

=== La Rioja ===
← Summary of the 9 March 2008 Congress of Deputies election results in La Rioja →
Parties and alliances	Popular vote			Seats	
Parties and alliances	Votes	%	±pp	Total	+/−
People's Party (PP)	93,104	49.51	−0.43	2	±0
Spanish Socialist Workers' Party (PSOE)	82,032	43.63	−0.34	2	±0
United Left (IU)	3,647	1.94	−0.82	0	±0
Riojan Party (PR)	2,837	1.51	New	0	±0
Union, Progress and Democracy (UPyD)	2,405	1.28	New	0	±0
The Greens (Verdes)	853	0.45	New	0	±0
For a Fairer World (PUM+J)	221	0.12	New	0	±0
Social Democratic Party (PSD)	214	0.11	New	0	±0
Communist Party of the Peoples of Spain (PCPE)	150	0.08	New	0	±0
Citizens–Party of the Citizenry (C's)	102	0.05	New	0	±0
Family and Life Party (PFyV)	72	0.04	−0.19	0	±0
National Democracy (DN)	72	0.04	−0.03	0	±0
Spanish Alternative (AES)	61	0.03	New	0	±0
Spanish Phalanx of the CNSO (FE de las JONS)	60	0.03	New	0	±0
Humanist Party (PH)	48	0.03	New	0	±0
Authentic Phalanx (FA)	39	0.02	New	0	±0
Spain 2000 (E–2000)	37	0.02	New	0	±0
Carlist Party (PC)	11	0.01	−0.02	0	±0
Blank ballots	2,068	1.10	−0.97		
Total	188,033			4	±0
Valid votes	188,033	99.30	+0.08		
Invalid votes	1,328	0.70	−0.08		
Votes cast / turnout	189,361	79.29	−0.17		
Abstentions	49,447	20.71	+0.17		
Registered voters	238,808				

=== Madrid ===
← Summary of the 9 March 2008 Congress of Deputies election results in Madrid →
Parties and alliances	Popular vote			Seats	
Parties and alliances	Votes	%	±pp	Total	+/−
People's Party (PP)	1,737,688	49.19	+4.17	18	+1
Spanish Socialist Workers' Party (PSOE)	1,401,785	39.68	−4.43	15	−1
United Left of the Community of Madrid–Alternative (IUCM)	164,595	4.66	−1.77	1	−1
Union, Progress and Democracy (UPyD)	132,095	3.74	New	1	+1
The Greens–Green Group (LV–GV)	10,875	0.31	New	0	±0
The Greens of the Community of Madrid–The Greens of Europe (LVCM–LVdE)	9,925	0.28	−0.28	0	±0
Anti-Bullfighting Party Against Mistreatment of Animals (PACMA)	4,755	0.13	New	0	±0
Citizens–Party of the Citizenry (C's)	3,996	0.11	New	0	±0
Spanish Phalanx of the CNSO (FE de las JONS)	3,250	0.09	+0.01	0	±0
National Democracy (DN)	3,087	0.09	−0.03	0	±0
Citizens for Blank Votes (CenB)	2,687	0.08	−0.21	0	±0
For a Fairer World (PUM+J)	2,516	0.07	New	0	±0
Communist Party of the Peoples of Spain (PCPE)	2,130	0.06	+0.01	0	±0
Spanish Alternative (AES)	2,082	0.06	New	0	±0
Alternative in Blank (ABLA)	1,876	0.05	New	0	±0
Non-Smokers' Party (PNF)	1,616	0.05	New	0	±0
Union for Leganés (ULEG)	1,566	0.04	New	0	±0
Social Democratic Party (PSD)	1,350	0.04	New	0	±0
Internationalist Socialist Workers' Party (POSI)	1,340	0.04	+0.01	0	±0
Democratic and Social Centre (CDS)	1,248	0.04	−0.17	0	±0
Family and Life Party (PFyV)	998	0.03	−0.05	0	±0
Humanist Party (PH)	901	0.03	−0.02	0	±0
Spanish Democratic Centre (CDEs)	828	0.02	New	0	±0
Liberal Party of State Employment and Housing (PLEVE)	786	0.02	New	0	±0
Authentic Phalanx (FA)	776	0.02	−0.01	0	±0
Spain 2000 (E–2000)	764	0.02	±0.00	0	±0
Commoners' Land (TC)	611	0.02	−0.01	0	±0
Spanish Front (Frente)	552	0.02	New	0	±0
Internationalist Solidarity and Self-Management (SAIn)	434	0.01	New	0	±0
National Alliance (AN)	406	0.01	−0.02	0	±0
Carlist Party (PC)	291	0.01	±0.00	0	±0
Regionalist Party of the Leonese Country (PREPAL)	250	0.01	New	0	±0
State of Spain Unionist Party (PUEDE)	214	0.01	New	0	±0
Civil Liberties Party (PLCI)	212	0.01	New	0	±0
Internationalist Struggle (LI (LIT–CI))	183	0.01	±0.00	0	±0
European Ibero-American Alliance Party (PAIE)	174	0.00	New	0	±0
Aitch Party (PHache)	0	0.00	New	0	±0
Blank ballots	33,539	0.95	−1.11		
Total	3,532,381			35	±0
Valid votes	3,532,381	99.48	−0.02		
Invalid votes	18,477	0.52	+0.02		
Votes cast / turnout	3,550,858	79.08	+0.15		
Abstentions	939,182	20.92	−0.15		
Registered voters	4,490,040				

=== Murcia ===
← Summary of the 9 March 2008 Congress of Deputies election results in Murcia →
Parties and alliances	Popular vote			Seats	
Parties and alliances	Votes	%	±pp	Total	+/−
People's Party (PP)	469,380	61.24	+3.82	7	+1
Spanish Socialist Workers' Party (PSOE)	251,822	32.85	−2.15	3	±0
United Left of the Region of Murcia–Alternative (IURM)	22,512	2.94	−1.33	0	±0
Union, Progress and Democracy (UPyD)	7,172	0.94	New	0	±0
The Greens (Verdes)	3,496	0.46	−0.52	0	±0
Anti-Bullfighting Party Against Mistreatment of Animals (PACMA)	1,178	0.15	New	0	±0
Liberal Democratic Centre (CDL)	767	0.10	New	0	±0
Social Democratic Party (PSD)	717	0.09	New	0	±0
For a Fairer World (PUM+J)	666	0.09	New	0	±0
Citizens–Party of the Citizenry (C's)	432	0.06	New	0	±0
Communist Party of the Peoples of Spain (PCPE)	431	0.06	±0.00	0	±0
Citizens for Blank Votes (CenB)	417	0.05	−0.08	0	±0
National Democracy (DN)	333	0.04	±0.00	0	±0
Spanish Phalanx of the CNSO (FE de las JONS)	318	0.04	−0.01	0	±0
Family and Life Party (PFyV)	292	0.04	−0.05	0	±0
Authentic Phalanx (FA)	176	0.02	−0.03	0	±0
Spanish Alternative (AES)	175	0.02	New	0	±0
National Alliance (AN)	132	0.02	New	0	±0
Spanish Front (Frente)	132	0.02	New	0	±0
Centrist Party (PCTR)	124	0.02	New	0	±0
Spain 2000 (E–2000)	116	0.02	±0.00	0	±0
Carlist Traditionalist Communion (CTC)	76	0.01	New	0	±0
Blank ballots	5,649	0.74	−0.69		
Total	766,510			10	+1
Valid votes	766,510	99.30	−0.08		
Invalid votes	5,402	0.70	+0.08		
Votes cast / turnout	771,912	79.58	+2.52		
Abstentions	198,034	20.42	−2.52		
Registered voters	969,946				

=== Navarre ===
← Summary of the 9 March 2008 Congress of Deputies election results in Navarre →
Parties and alliances	Popular vote			Seats	
Parties and alliances	Votes	%	±pp	Total	+/−
Navarrese People's Union–People's Party (UPN–PP)	133,059	39.22	+1.62	2	±0
Spanish Socialist Workers' Party (PSOE)	117,920	34.76	+1.21	2	±0
Navarre Yes (NaBai)	62,398	18.39	+0.41	1	±0
United Left of Navarre–Alternative (IUN/NEB)	11,098	3.27	−2.59	0	±0
Union, Progress and Democracy (UPyD)	2,608	0.77	New	0	±0
Navarrese Cannabis Representation (RCN/NOK)	2,288	0.67	New	0	±0
The Greens–Green Group (LV–GV)	1,252	0.37	New	0	±0
For a Fairer World (PUM+J)	560	0.17	New	0	±0
Anti-Bullfighting Party Against Mistreatment of Animals (PACMA)	530	0.16	New	0	±0
Social Democratic Party (PSD)	478	0.14	New	0	±0
Internationalist Solidarity and Self-Management (SAIn)	360	0.11	New	0	±0
Carlist Party (PC)	324	0.10	−0.08	0	±0
Family and Life Party (PFyV)	239	0.07	−0.16	0	±0
Citizens–Party of the Citizenry (C's)	218	0.06	New	0	±0
Communist Party of the Peoples of Spain–Basque Communists (PCPE–EK)	213	0.06	New	0	±0
Humanist Party (PH)	188	0.06	−0.22	0	±0
National Democracy (DN)	137	0.04	−0.06	0	±0
Spanish Phalanx of the CNSO (FE de las JONS)	128	0.04	New	0	±0
Spain 2000 (E–2000)	91	0.03	−0.04	0	±0
Spanish Alternative (AES)	90	0.03	New	0	±0
Authentic Phalanx (FA)	50	0.01	New	0	±0
Blank ballots	5,001	1.47	−0.51		
Total	339,230			5	±0
Valid votes	339,230	99.31	+3.77		
Invalid votes	2,360	0.69	−3.77		
Votes cast / turnout	341,590	72.06	−4.16		
Abstentions	132,468	27.94	+4.16		
Registered voters	474,058				

=== Valencian Community ===
← Summary of the 9 March 2008 Congress of Deputies election results in the Valencian Community →
Parties and alliances	Popular vote			Seats	
Parties and alliances	Votes	%	±pp	Total	+/−
People's Party (PP)	1,415,793	51.59	+4.81	19	+2
Spanish Socialist Workers' Party (PSOE)	1,124,414	40.97	−1.48	14	±0
United and Republican Left (EUPV–IR)	74,405	2.71	−1.94	0	−1
Bloc–Initiative–Greens (Bloc–IdPV–EVEE)	29,760	1.08	−0.45	0	±0
Union, Progress and Democracy (UPyD)	19,294	0.70	New	0	±0
The Greens (EV–LV)^{1}	7,824	0.29	−0.52	0	±0
Republican Left of the Valencian Country (esquerra–PV)	6,607	0.24	−0.26	0	±0
The Greens–Green Group (LV–GV)	5,803	0.21	New	0	±0
Valencian Coalition (CVa)	5,424	0.20	New	0	±0
Navarrese Cannabis Representation (RCN/NOK)	4,326	0.16	−0.41	0	±0
Anti-Bullfighting Party Against Mistreatment of Animals (PACMA)	4,213	0.15	New	0	±0
Spain 2000 (E–2000)	3,875	0.14	+0.04	0	±0
Social Democratic Party (PSD)	3,246	0.12	New	0	±0
Citizens–Party of the Citizenry (C's)	2,156	0.08	New	0	±0
For a Fairer World (PUM+J)	1,821	0.07	New	0	±0
Communist Party of the Peoples of Spain (PCPE)	1,660	0.06	−0.03	0	±0
Spanish Phalanx of the CNSO (FE de las JONS)	1,631	0.06	+0.01	0	±0
Valencian Nationalist Option (ONV)	1,490	0.05	New	0	±0
Citizens for Blank Votes (CenB)	1,323	0.05	−0.18	0	±0
Family and Life Party (PFyV)	900	0.03	−0.05	0	±0
Humanist Party (PH)	773	0.03	−0.04	0	±0
National Democracy (DN)	734	0.03	−0.04	0	±0
For the Valencian Republic (plRV)	645	0.02	New	0	±0
Authentic Phalanx (FA)	583	0.02	−0.02	0	±0
Internationalist Socialist Workers' Party (POSI)	571	0.02	−0.02	0	±0
Spanish Alternative (AES)	461	0.02	New	0	±0
Kingdom of Valencia Identity (IRV)	449	0.02	−0.06	0	±0
National Alliance (AN)	434	0.02	New	0	±0
Liberal Democratic Centre (CDL)	347	0.01	New	0	±0
Centrist Party (PCTR)	200	0.01	New	0	±0
Carlist Traditionalist Communion (CTC)	70	0.00	New	0	±0
Blank ballots	23,230	0.85	−0.61		
Total	2,744,462			33	+1
Valid votes	2,744,462	99.33	−0.02		
Invalid votes	18,558	0.67	+0.02		
Votes cast / turnout	2,763,020	78.84	+1.13		
Abstentions	741,393	21.16	−1.13		
Registered voters	3,504,413				
Sources
Footnotes: ^{1} The Greens results are compared to The Eco-pacifist Greens totals in the 2004 election.

== Autonomous cities ==
=== Ceuta ===
← Summary of the 9 March 2008 Congress of Deputies election results in Ceuta →
Parties and alliances	Popular vote			Seats	
Parties and alliances	Votes	%	±pp	Total	+/−
People's Party (PP)	20,040	55.11	−4.13	1	±0
Spanish Socialist Workers' Party (PSOE)	14,716	40.47	+4.69	0	±0
Union, Progress and Democracy (UPyD)	481	1.32	New	0	±0
United Left of Ceuta (IU)	244	0.67	+0.06	0	±0
The Greens–Green Group (LV–GV)	220	0.60	New	0	±0
Anti-Bullfighting Party Against Mistreatment of Animals (PACMA)	104	0.29	New	0	±0
Social Democratic Party (PSD)	67	0.18	New	0	±0
Spanish Phalanx of the CNSO (FE de las JONS)	58	0.16	New	0	±0
For a Fairer World (PUM+J)	42	0.12	New	0	±0
Citizens–Party of the Citizenry (C's)	32	0.09	New	0	±0
Spanish Alternative (AES)	18	0.05	New	0	±0
Blank ballots	342	0.94	−0.50		
Total	36,364			1	±0
Valid votes	36,364	99.34	+0.23		
Invalid votes	241	0.66	−0.23		
Votes cast / turnout	36,605	63.32	−0.13		
Abstentions	21,200	36.68	+0.13		
Registered voters	57,805				

=== Melilla ===
← Summary of the 9 March 2008 Congress of Deputies election results in Melilla →
Parties and alliances	Popular vote			Seats	
Parties and alliances	Votes	%	±pp	Total	+/−
People's Party (PP)	15,717	49.03	−5.57	1	±0
Spanish Socialist Workers' Party (PSOE)	15,420	48.10	+6.67	0	±0
Union, Progress and Democracy (UPyD)	367	1.14	New	0	±0
The Greens–Green Group (LV–GV)	77	0.24	−0.26	0	±0
Social Democratic Party (PSD)	73	0.23	New	0	±0
Spanish Phalanx of the CNSO (FE de las JONS)	44	0.14	New	0	±0
Citizens–Party of the Citizenry (C's)	39	0.12	New	0	±0
For a Fairer World (PUM+J)	33	0.10	New	0	±0
Blank ballots	285	0.89	−0.71		
Total	32,055			1	±0
Valid votes	32,055	99.26	+0.08		
Invalid votes	240	0.74	−0.08		
Votes cast / turnout	32,295	63.68	+7.84		
Abstentions	18,416	36.32	−7.84		
Registered voters	50,711				
