= A Coruña (Senate constituency) =

Senate constituency in Spain

Coordinates: 43°22′N 8°24′W

- Senate of Spain; Electoral constituency
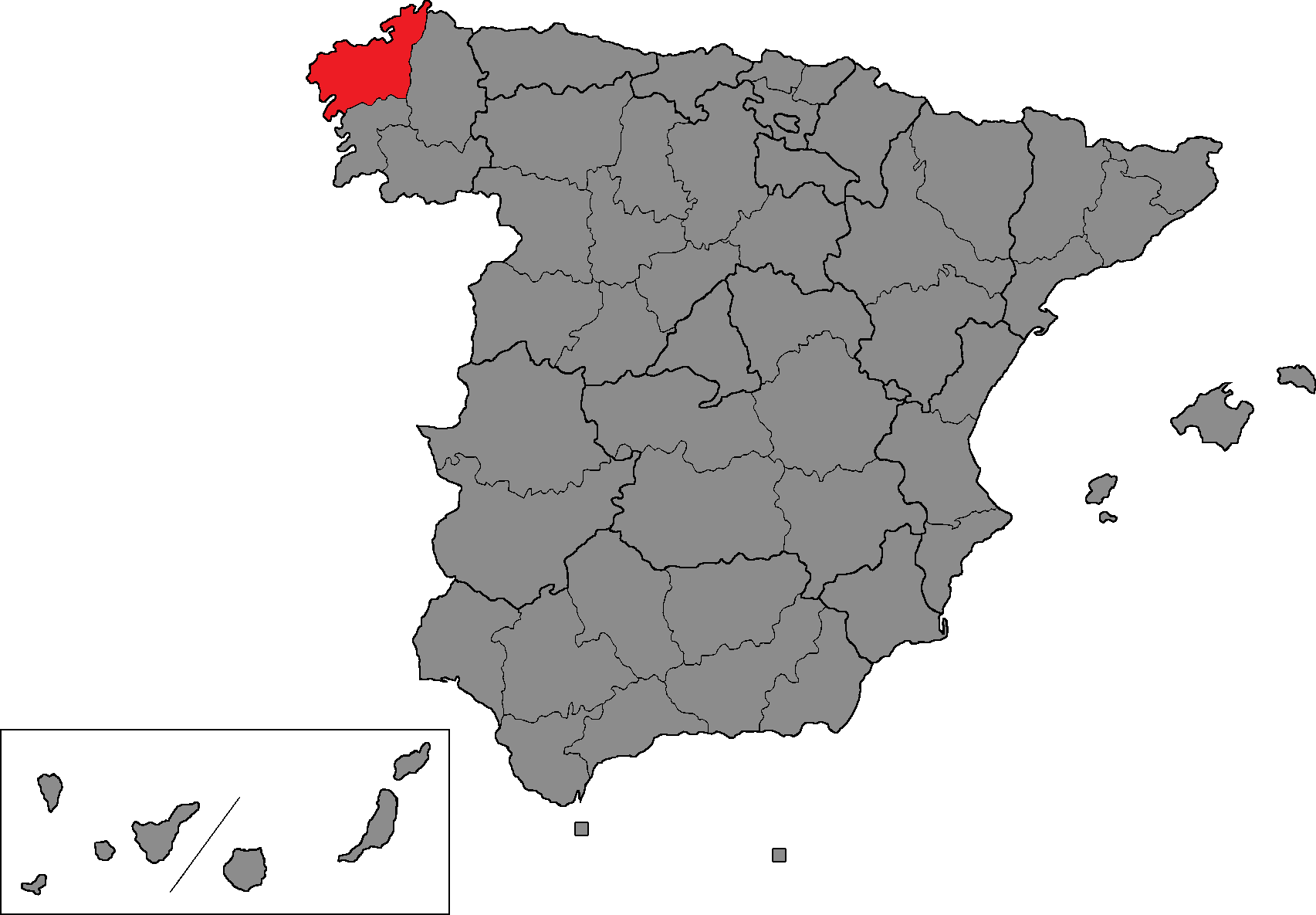
- Location of A Coruña within Spain
- Province: A Coruña
- Autonomous community: Galicia
- Population: ▲1,128,320 (2024)
- Electorate: ▼1,085,673 (2023)
- Major settlements: A Coruña, Santiago de Compostela, Ferrol

Current constituency
- Created: 1977
- Seats: 4
- Members: PP (3); PSOE (1)

A Coruña (Spanish: La Coruña, English: Corunna) is one of the 60 constituencies represented in the Senate of Spain, the upper chamber of the Spanish parliament, the Cortes Generales. The constituency (whose boundaries correspond to those of the homonymous province) elects four senators. The electoral system uses open-list (Note: Parties can group candidates into lists, although each candidate is treated separately for the purpose of the voting procedure.) partial block voting, with electors voting for individual candidates instead of parties. Electors can vote for up to three candidates.

== Electoral system ==
The constituency was created as per the Political Reform Law and was first contested in the 1977 general election. The Law provided for the provinces of Spain to be established as multi-member districts in the Senate, with this regulation being maintained under the Spanish Constitution of 1978. Additionally, the Constitution requires for any modification of the provincial limits to be approved under an organic law, needing an absolute majority in the Cortes Generales.

Voting is based on universal suffrage, comprising all Spanish nationals over 18 years of age with full political rights, provided that they have not been deprived of the right to vote by a final sentence. The only exception was in 1977, when this was limited to nationals over 21 years of age and in full enjoyment of their political and civil rights. Amendments in 2011 required non-resident citizens to apply for voting, a system known as "begged" voting (Spanish: Voto rogado). which was abolished in 2022. Further, amendments in 2018 granted the right to vote to those legally incapacitated. 209 Senate seats (207 in 1977, 208 from 1978 to 2026) are elected using open-list partial block voting: voters in constituencies electing four seats can choose up to three candidates; in those with two or three seats, up to two; and in single-member districts, one. Each of the 47 peninsular provinces is allocated four seats, while in insular provinces—such as the Balearic and Canary Islands—the districts are the islands themselves, with the larger ones (Mallorca, Gran Canaria and Tenerife) being allocated three seats each, and the smaller ones (Menorca, Ibiza, Formentera, Fuerteventura, La Gomera, El Hierro, Lanzarote and La Palma) one each. (Note: La Gomera and El Hierro comprised a single constituency for the 1977 election. A constitutional reform in 2026 awarded Formentera an independent senator separate from Ibiza.) Ceuta and Melilla elect two seats each. Until 1985, the law also provided for by-elections to fill Senate seats vacated up to two years into the legislature; subsequently, any vacancies arising after the proclamation of candidates and during the legislative term are filled by the next candidates on the party lists or, when required, by designated substitutes.

The electoral law allows for parties and federations registered in the interior ministry, alliances and groupings of electors to present lists of candidates. Parties and federations intending to form an alliance are required to inform the relevant electoral commission within 10 days of the election call—15 before 1985—whereas groupings of electors need to secure the signature of at least one percent of the electorate in the constituencies for which they seek election—one permille of the electorate, with a compulsory minimum of 500 signatures, until 1985—disallowing electors from signing for more than one list. Also since 2011, parties, federations or alliances that have not obtained a mandate in either chamber of the Cortes at the preceding election are required to secure the signature of at least 0.1 percent of electors in the aforementioned constituencies. Amendments in 2007 required a balanced composition of men and women in the electoral lists, so that candidates of either sex made up at least 40 percent of the total composition; further amendments in 2024 required the use of a zipper system.

== Senators ==
Senators for A Coruña 1977–
Key to parties En Marea CDG PSOE UCD PP CP AP
Legislature	Election	Distribution
Constituent	1977	1 / 3
1st	1979	1 / 3
2nd	1982	3 / 1
3rd	1986	3 / 1
4th	1989	1 / 3
5th	1993	1 / 3
6th	1996	1 / 3
7th	2000	1 / 3
8th	2004	1 / 3
9th	2008	1 / 3
10th	2011	1 / 3
11th	2015	1 / 3
12th	2016	1 / 3
13th	2019 (Apr)	3 / 1
14th	2019 (Nov)	1 / 3
15th	2023	1 / 3

== General elections ==
=== 2023 ===
Summary of the 23 July 2023 Senate of Spain election results in A Coruña
Parties and alliances	Popular vote			Seats	
Parties and alliances	Votes	%	±pp	Total	+/−
People's Party (PP)	828,849	43.48	+9.34	3	±0
Socialists' Party of Galicia (PSdeG–PSOE)	540,616	28.36	−3.47	1	±0
Galician Nationalist Bloc (BNG)	231,247	12.13	+0.58	0	±0
Unite Galicia (Sumar)^{1}	197,637	10.37	−1.97	0	±0
Vox (Vox)	78,257	4.11	+1.65	0	±0
Animalist Party with the Environment (PACMA)^{2}	15,723	0.82	−0.52	0	±0
Zero Cuts (Recortes Cero)	1,840	0.10	−0.04	0	±0
Blank ballots (Note: The percentage of blank ballots is calculated over the official number of valid votes cast, irrespective of the total number of votes shown as a result of adding up the individual results for each party.)	12,064	1.82	−0.88		
Total	1,906,233			4	±0
Valid votes	661,153	98.00	+0.42		
Invalid votes	13,488	2.00	−0.42		
Votes cast / turnout	674,641	62.14	+5.79		
Abstentions	411,032	37.86	−5.79		
Registered voters	1,085,673				
Sources
Footnotes: ^{1} Unite Galicia results are compared to the combined totals of In Common–United We Can and More Country–Equo in the November 2019 election.; ^{2} Animalist Party with the Environment results are compared to Animalist Party Against Mistreatment of Animals totals in the November 2019 election.

=== November 2019 ===
Summary of the 10 November 2019 Senate of Spain election results in A Coruña
Parties and alliances	Popular vote			Seats	
Parties and alliances	Votes	%	±pp	Total	+/−
People's Party (PP)	567,261	34.14	+6.18	3	+2
Socialists' Party of Galicia (PSdeG–PSOE)	528,901	31.83	+0.42	1	−2
Galician Nationalist Bloc (BNG)	191,857	11.55	+3.18	0	±0
In Common–United We Can (Podemos–EU)	187,357	11.28	−1.24	0	±0
Citizens–Party of the Citizenry (Cs)	83,249	5.01	−5.83	0	±0
Vox (Vox)	40,906	2.46	−1.84	0	±0
Animalist Party Against Mistreatment of Animals (PACMA)	22,225	1.34	−0.27	0	±0
More Country–Equo (Más País–Equo)	17,552	1.06	New	0	±0
Zero Cuts–Green Group (Recortes Cero–GV)	2,375	0.14	−0.01	0	±0
Communist Party of the Workers of Galicia (PCTG)	2,109	0.13	±0.00	0	±0
For a Fairer World (PUM+J)	1,699	0.10	New	0	±0
Blank ballots	16,125	2.70	+0.12		
Total	1,661,616			4	±0
Valid votes	598,144	97.58	+0.19		
Invalid votes	14,827	2.42	−0.19		
Votes cast / turnout	612,971	56.35	−6.15		
Abstentions	474,868	43.65	+6.15		
Registered voters	1,087,839				

=== April 2019 ===
Summary of the 28 April 2019 Senate of Spain election results in A Coruña
Parties and alliances	Popular vote			Seats	
Parties and alliances	Votes	%	±pp	Total	+/−
Socialists' Party of Galicia (PSdeG–PSOE)	593,511	31.41	+9.42	3	+2
People's Party (PP)	528,361	27.96	−13.33	1	−2
In Common–United We Can (Podemos–EU–Mareas en Común–Equo)^{1}	236,591	12.52	−9.05	0	±0
Citizens–Party of the Citizenry (Cs)	204,888	10.84	+4.00	0	±0
Galician Nationalist Bloc (BNG)	158,191	8.37	+3.60	0	±0
Vox (Vox)	81,262	4.30	+4.14	0	±0
Animalist Party Against Mistreatment of Animals (PACMA)	30,473	1.61	−0.24	0	±0
In Tide (En Marea)	30,163	1.60	New	0	±0
Commitment to Galicia (CxG)	3,941	0.21	New	0	±0
Zero Cuts–Green Group (Recortes Cero–GV)	2,900	0.15	−0.07	0	±0
Communist Party of the Workers of Galicia (PCTG)	2,407	0.13	New	0	±0
Blank ballots	17,112	2.58	−0.50		
Total	1,889,800			4	±0
Valid votes	662,129	97.39	+0.01		
Invalid votes	17,732	2.61	−0.01		
Votes cast / turnout	679,861	62.50	+4.02		
Abstentions	407,995	37.50	−4.02		
Registered voters	1,087,856				
Sources
Footnotes: ^{1} In Common–United We Can results are compared to Podemos–Anova–EU totals in the 2016 election.

=== 2016 ===
Summary of the 26 June 2016 Senate of Spain election results in A Coruña
Parties and alliances	Popular vote			Seats	
Parties and alliances	Votes	%	±pp	Total	+/−
People's Party (PP)	727,947	41.29	+4.59	3	±0
Socialists' Party of Galicia (PSdeG–PSOE)	387,590	21.99	+1.58	1	+1
In Tide (Podemos–Anova–EU)	380,256	21.57	−2.52	0	−1
Citizens–Party of the Citizenry (C's)	120,596	6.84	−0.23	0	±0
Galician Nationalist Bloc–We–Galician Candidacy (BNG–Nós)^{1}	84,043	4.77	−2.22	0	±0
Animalist Party Against Mistreatment of Animals (PACMA)	32,628	1.85	+0.26	0	±0
Zero Cuts–Green Group (Recortes Cero–GV)	3,902	0.22	−0.06	0	±0
Vox (Vox)	2,833	0.16	New	0	±0
Communists of Galicia (PCPE–CdG)	2,493	0.14	−0.05	0	±0
Internationalist Solidarity and Self-Management (SAIn)	1,499	0.09	−0.03	0	±0
Blank ballots	19,060	3.08	−1.57		
Total	1,762,847			4	±0
Valid votes	619,308	97.38	+0.86		
Invalid votes	16,688	2.62	−0.86		
Votes cast / turnout	635,996	58.48	−2.10		
Abstentions	451,476	41.52	+2.10		
Registered voters	1,087,472				
Sources
Footnotes: ^{1} Galician Nationalist Bloc–We–Galician Candidacy results are compared to We–Galician Candidacy totals in the 2015 election.

=== 2015 ===
Summary of the 20 December 2015 Senate of Spain election results in A Coruña
Parties and alliances	Popular vote			Seats	
Parties and alliances	Votes	%	±pp	Total	+/−
People's Party (PP)	656,486	36.70	−14.98	3	±0
In Tide (Podemos–Anova–EU)^{1}	431,040	24.09	+20.20	1	+1
Socialists' Party of Galicia (PSdeG–PSOE)	365,081	20.41	−5.37	0	−1
Citizens–Party of the Citizenry (C's)	126,541	7.07	New	0	±0
We–Galician Candidacy (Nós)^{2}	125,091	6.99	−7.42	0	±0
Animalist Party Against Mistreatment of Animals (PACMA)	28,467	1.59	+0.90	0	±0
Union, Progress and Democracy (UPyD)	12,091	0.68	+0.10	0	±0
Zero Cuts–Green Group (Recortes Cero–GV)	4,983	0.28	New	0	±0
Land Party (PT)	3,979	0.22	New	0	±0
Communists of Galicia (PCPE–CdG)	3,420	0.19	+0.12	0	±0
Internationalist Solidarity and Self-Management (SAIn)	2,218	0.12	+0.02	0	±0
Blank ballots	29,608	4.65	−0.76		
Total	1,789,005			4	±0
Valid votes	636,608	96.52	+0.20		
Invalid votes	22,956	3.48	−0.20		
Votes cast / turnout	659,564	60.58	−0.97		
Abstentions	429,258	39.42	+0.97		
Registered voters	1,088,822				
Sources
Footnotes: ^{1} In Tide results are compared to United Left–The Greens: Plural Left totals in the 2011 election.; ^{2} We–Galician Candidacy results are compared to Galician Nationalist Bloc totals in the 2011 election.

=== 2011 ===
Summary of the 20 November 2011 Senate of Spain election results in A Coruña
Parties and alliances	Popular vote			Seats	
Parties and alliances	Votes	%	±pp	Total	+/−
People's Party (PP)	922,071	51.68	+9.65	3	±0
Socialists' Party of Galicia (PSdeG–PSOE)	459,876	25.78	−11.76	1	±0
Galician Nationalist Bloc (BNG)	257,030	14.41	−1.75	0	±0
United Left–The Greens: Plural Left (EU–V)	69,326	3.89	+2.26	0	±0
Animalist Party Against Mistreatment of Animals (PACMA)	12,384	0.69	+0.47	0	±0
Union, Progress and Democracy (UPyD)	10,316	0.58	−0.08	0	±0
Equo (Equo)	7,277	0.41	New	0	±0
For a Fairer World (PUM+J)	3,037	0.17	+0.08	0	±0
Humanist Party (PH)	2,967	0.17	+0.11	0	±0
Internationalist Solidarity and Self-Management (SAIn)	1,801	0.10	+0.04	0	±0
Communist Party of the Peoples of Spain (PCPE)	1,331	0.07	New	0	±0
XXI Convergence (C.XXI)	922	0.05	New	0	±0
Communist Unification of Spain (UCE)	852	0.05	New	0	±0
Blank ballots	34,840	5.41	+3.10		
Total	1,784,030			4	±0
Valid votes	643,437	96.32	−0.76		
Invalid votes	24,567	3.68	+0.76		
Votes cast / turnout	668,004	61.55	−8.62		
Abstentions	417,228	38.45	+8.62		
Registered voters	1,085,232				

=== 2008 ===
Summary of the 9 March 2008 Senate of Spain election results in A Coruña
Parties and alliances	Popular vote			Seats	
Parties and alliances	Votes	%	±pp	Total	+/−
People's Party (PP)	851,181	42.03	+0.14	3	±0
Socialists' Party of Galicia (PSdeG–PSOE)	760,311	37.54	+1.02	1	±0
Galician Nationalist Bloc (BNG)	327,159	16.16	+0.31	0	±0
United Left–Alternative (EU–IU)	33,105	1.63	−0.30	0	±0
Union, Progress and Democracy (UPyD)	13,352	0.66	New	0	±0
Anti-Bullfighting Party Against Mistreatment of Animals (PACMA)	4,462	0.22	New	0	±0
The Greens of Europe (LVdE)	4,454	0.22	New	0	±0
For a Fairer World (PUM+J)	1,922	0.09	New	0	±0
Spanish Catholic Movement (MCE)	1,340	0.07	New	0	±0
Electronic Voting Assembly (AVE)	1,273	0.06	New	0	±0
Citizens–Party of the Citizenry (C's)	1,265	0.06	New	0	±0
Independent Alternative of Galicia (AIdG)	1,150	0.06	New	0	±0
Humanist Party (PH)	1,148	0.06	−1.35	0	±0
Internationalist Solidarity and Self-Management (SAIn)	1,122	0.06	New	0	±0
Social Democratic Party (PSD)	972	0.05	New	0	±0
Internationalist Socialist Workers' Party (POSI)	737	0.04	New	0	±0
Family and Life Party (PFyV)	692	0.03	New	0	±0
Galician Identity (IG)	590	0.03	New	0	±0
Spanish Phalanx of the CNSO (FE–JONS)	577	0.03	New	0	±0
Carlist Traditionalist Communion (CTC)	456	0.02	−0.05	0	±0
National Democracy (DN)	396	0.02	−0.02	0	±0
Authentic Phalanx (FA)	351	0.02	New	0	±0
Spanish Alternative (AES)	310	0.02	New	0	±0
Blank ballots	16,795	2.31	−0.43		
Total	2,025,120			4	±0
Valid votes	727,822	97.08	+0.11		
Invalid votes	21,854	2.92	−0.11		
Votes cast / turnout	749,676	70.17	−0.15		
Abstentions	318,757	29.83	+0.15		
Registered voters	1,068,433				

=== 2004 ===
Summary of the 14 March 2004 Senate of Spain election results in A Coruña
Parties and alliances	Popular vote			Seats	
Parties and alliances	Votes	%	±pp	Total	+/−
People's Party (PP)	845,446	41.89	−8.41	3	±0
Socialists' Party of Galicia (PSdeG–PSOE)	737,039	36.52	+11.07	1	±0
Galician Nationalist Bloc (BNG)	319,980	15.85	−4.82	0	±0
United Left (EU–IU)	38,948	1.93	+0.36	0	±0
Humanist Party (PH)	28,387	1.41	+1.28	0	±0
Burdened and Angry Citizens (CAyC)	13,855	0.69	New	0	±0
Party of Self-employed and Professionals (AUTONOMO)	4,195	0.21	−0.03	0	±0
Galician People's Front (FPG)	3,912	0.19	+0.10	0	±0
Democratic and Social Centre (CDS)	2,443	0.12	+0.05	0	±0
Galician Coalition (CG)	1,408	0.07	New	0	±0
Carlist Traditionalist Communion (CTC)	1,331	0.07	+0.05	0	±0
Republican Left–Galician Republican Left (IR–ERG)	832	0.04	New	0	±0
National Democracy (DN)	757	0.04	New	0	±0
Blank ballots	19,701	2.74	+0.06		
Total	2,018,234			4	±0
Valid votes	718,546	96.97	+0.08		
Invalid votes	22,463	3.03	−0.08		
Votes cast / turnout	741,009	70.32	+6.91		
Abstentions	312,729	29.68	−6.91		
Registered voters	1,053,738				

=== 2000 ===
Summary of the 12 March 2000 Senate of Spain election results in A Coruña
Parties and alliances	Popular vote			Seats	
Parties and alliances	Votes	%	±pp	Total	+/−
People's Party (PP)	892,048	50.30	+2.71	3	±0
Socialists' Party of Galicia–Progressives (PSdeG–PSOE–p)	451,343	25.45	−7.41	1	±0
Galician Nationalist Bloc (BNG)	366,636	20.67	+6.39	0	±0
United Left (EU–IU)	27,886	1.57	−2.17	0	±0
Galician Democracy (DG)	7,214	0.41	New	0	±0
Party of Self-employed and Professionals (AUTONOMO)	4,290	0.24	New	0	±0
Humanist Party (PH)	2,248	0.13	+0.04	0	±0
Galician People's Front (FPG)	1,619	0.09	+0.03	0	±0
Centrist Union–Democratic and Social Centre (UC–CDS)	1,169	0.07	−0.05	0	±0
Independent Spanish Phalanx–Phalanx 2000 (FEI–FE 2000)	915	0.05	+0.01	0	±0
The Phalanx (FE)	605	0.03	New	0	±0
Carlist Traditionalist Communion (CTC)	327	0.02	New	0	±0
Valencian Union (UV)	205	0.01	−0.01	0	±0
Blank ballots	17,054	2.68	+0.48		
Total	1,773,559			4	±0
Valid votes	635,212	96.89	+0.20		
Invalid votes	20,416	3.11	−0.20		
Votes cast / turnout	655,628	63.41	−7.14		
Abstentions	378,337	36.59	+7.14		
Registered voters	1,033,965				

=== 1996 ===
Summary of the 3 March 1996 Senate of Spain election results in La Coruña
Parties and alliances	Popular vote			Seats	
Parties and alliances	Votes	%	±pp	Total	+/−
People's Party (PP)	900,359	47.59	+3.23	3	±0
Socialists' Party of Galicia (PSdeG–PSOE)	621,608	32.86	−3.62	1	±0
Galician Nationalist Bloc (BNG)	270,183	14.28	+4.47	0	±0
United Left–Galician Left (EU–EG)	70,741	3.74	−1.50	0	±0
The Greens of Galicia (Os Verdes)	5,706	0.30	−0.03	0	±0
Centrist Union (UC)	2,255	0.12	−1.72	0	±0
Humanist Party (PH)	1,672	0.09	+0.01	0	±0
Communist Party of the Galician People (PCPG)	1,464	0.08	−0.17	0	±0
Galician People's Front (FPG)	1,106	0.06	New	0	±0
Independent Spanish Phalanx (FEI)	735	0.04	±0.00	0	±0
Republican Coalition (CR)	657	0.03	New	0	±0
Alliance for National Unity (AUN)	529	0.03	New	0	±0
Valencian Union (UV)	296	0.02	New	0	±0
Blank ballots	14,657	2.20	+0.17		
Total	1,891,968			4	±0
Valid votes	667,558	96.69	−0.60		
Invalid votes	22,855	3.31	+0.60		
Votes cast / turnout	690,413	70.55	+1.13		
Abstentions	288,206	29.45	−1.13		
Registered voters	978,619				

=== 1993 ===
Summary of the 6 June 1993 Senate of Spain election results in La Coruña
Parties and alliances	Popular vote			Seats	
Parties and alliances	Votes	%	±pp	Total	+/−
People's Party (PP)	790,324	44.36	+5.98	3	±0
Socialists' Party of Galicia (PSdeG–PSOE)	649,870	36.48	+0.30	1	±0
Galician Nationalist Bloc (BNG)	174,795	9.81	+5.33	0	±0
United Left–Galician Unity (EU–UG)	93,351	5.24	+1.25	0	±0
Democratic and Social Centre (CDS)	32,759	1.84	−5.90	0	±0
Galician Alternative (AG)	6,239	0.35	New	0	±0
The Greens (Os Verdes)^{1}	5,960	0.33	−0.13	0	±0
Galician Nationalist Convergence (CNG)	4,729	0.27	New	0	±0
Communist Party of the Galician People (PCPG)^{2}	4,491	0.25	+0.18	0	±0
The Ecologists (LE)	4,292	0.24	New	0	±0
Humanist Party (PH)	1,351	0.08	New	0	±0
Independent Spanish Phalanx (FEI)	665	0.04	New	0	±0
Communist Unification of Spain (UCE)	0	0.00	New	0	±0
Blank ballots	12,612	2.03	−0.84		
Total	1,781,438			4	±0
Valid votes	621,354	97.29	+2.35		
Invalid votes	17,291	2.71	−2.35		
Votes cast / turnout	638,645	69.42	+10.29		
Abstentions	281,322	30.58	−10.29		
Registered voters	919,967				
Sources
Footnotes: ^{1} The Greens results are compared to The Greens–Green List totals in the 1989 election.; ^{2} Communist Party of the Galician People results are compared to Communists in the Senate Coalition totals in the 1989 election.

=== 1989 ===
Summary of the 29 October 1989 Senate of Spain election results in La Coruña
Parties and alliances	Popular vote			Seats	
Parties and alliances	Votes	%	±pp	Total	+/−
People's Party (PP)^{1}	535,783	38.38	+1.08	3	+2
Socialists' Party of Galicia (PSdeG–PSOE)	505,153	36.18	−2.97	1	−2
Democratic and Social Centre (CDS)	108,052	7.74	−1.21	0	±0
Galician Nationalist Bloc (BNG)	62,598	4.48	+1.52	0	±0
United Left (EU)	55,645	3.99	+2.55	0	±0
Galician Socialist Party–Galician Left (PSG–EG)	45,866	3.29	−0.67	0	±0
Galician Nationalist Party–Galicianist Party (PNG–PG)	22,572	1.62	New	0	±0
Galician Coalition (CG)	14,853	1.06	−2.49	0	±0
Workers' Party of Spain–Communist Unity (PTE–UC)^{2}	7,830	0.56	−0.83	0	±0
The Greens–Green List (LV–LV)	6,388	0.46	New	0	±0
Workers' Socialist Party (PST)	6,229	0.45	+0.30	0	±0
Spanish Vertex Ecological Development Revindication (VERDE)	4,994	0.36	New	0	±0
Spanish Phalanx of the CNSO (FE–JONS)	3,133	0.22	−0.01	0	±0
Galician People's Front (FPG)	1,156	0.08	New	0	±0
Communists in the Senate Coalition (CelS)	978	0.07	New	0	±0
Alliance for the Republic (AxR)^{3}	770	0.06	+0.02	0	±0
Blank ballots	14,164	2.87	+0.68		
Total	1,396,164			4	±0
Valid votes	493,882	94.94	−1.15		
Invalid votes	26,339	5.06	+1.15		
Votes cast / turnout	520,221	59.13	+0.02		
Abstentions	359,541	40.87	−0.02		
Registered voters	879,762				
Sources
Footnotes: ^{1} People's Party results are compared to People's Coalition totals in the 1986 election.; ^{2} Workers' Party of Spain–Communist Unity results are compared to Communists' Unity Board totals in the 1986 election.; ^{3} Alliance for the Republic results are compared to Internationalist Socialist Workers' Party totals in the 1986 election.

=== 1986 ===
Summary of the 22 June 1986 Senate of Spain election results in La Coruña
Parties and alliances	Popular vote			Seats	
Parties and alliances	Votes	%	±pp	Total	+/−
Socialists' Party of Galicia (PSdG–PSOE)	555,644	39.15	+2.45	3	±0
People's Coalition (AP–PDP–PL)^{1}	529,362	37.30	+2.49	1	±0
Democratic and Social Centre (CDS)	127,054	8.95	+6.32	0	±0
Galician Socialist Party–Galician Left (PSG–EG)^{2}	56,210	3.96	+2.07	0	±0
Galician Coalition (CG)	50,428	3.55	New	0	±0
Galician Nationalist Bloc (BNG)	42,041	2.96	−0.43	0	±0
Galicianist and United Left Platform (PG–EU)^{3}	20,428	1.44	−0.56	0	±0
Communists' Unity Board (MUC)	19,739	1.39	New	0	±0
Spanish Phalanx of the CNSO (FE–JONS)	3,197	0.23	New	0	±0
Workers' Socialist Party (PST)	2,072	0.15	−1.72	0	±0
Communist Unification of Spain (UCE)	1,153	0.08	+0.01	0	±0
Internationalist Socialist Workers' Party (POSI)	502	0.04	New	0	±0
National Unity Coalition (CUN)	488	0.03	New	0	±0
Blank ballots	10,843	2.19	+0.42		
Total	1,419,161			4	±0
Valid votes	495,783	96.09	−0.05		
Invalid votes	20,178	3.91	+0.05		
Votes cast / turnout	515,961	59.11	−5.92		
Abstentions	356,917	40.89	+5.92		
Registered voters	872,878				
Sources
Footnotes: ^{1} People's Coalition results are compared to People's Alliance–People's Democratic Party totals in the 1982 election.; ^{2} Galician Socialist Party–Galician Left results are compared to Galician Left totals in the 1982 election.; ^{3} Galicianist and United Left Platform results are compared to Communist Party of Galicia totals in the 1982 election.

=== 1982 ===
Summary of the 28 October 1982 Senate of Spain election results in La Coruña
Parties and alliances	Popular vote			Seats	
Parties and alliances	Votes	%	±pp	Total	+/−
Socialists' Party of Galicia (PSdG–PSOE)	525,360	36.70	+17.25	3	+2
People's Alliance–People's Democratic Party (AP–PDP)^{1}	498,292	34.81	+22.87	1	+1
Union of the Democratic Centre (UCD)	186,688	13.04	−32.81	0	−3
Galician Nationalist Bloc–Galician Socialist Party (B–PSG)^{2}	48,564	3.39	−10.34	0	±0
Democratic and Social Centre (CDS)	37,614	2.63	New	0	±0
Communist Party of Galicia (PCE–PCG)	28,690	2.00	−3.37	0	±0
Galician Left (EG)	27,079	1.89	New	0	±0
Workers' Socialist Party (PST)	26,832	1.87	New	0	±0
Independent Galician Electoral Group (AEGI)	16,149	1.13	New	0	±0
Galician Independents and Migrants (IDG)	10,571	0.74	New	0	±0
Rainbow Electoral Group (Arcoiris)	7,910	0.55	New	0	±0
New Force (FN)^{3}	4,859	0.34	−0.69	0	±0
Liberated Galiza (GC)	3,000	0.21	New	0	±0
Communist Unification of Spain (UCE)	1,001	0.07	New	0	±0
Blank ballots	8,892	1.77	−0.21		
Total	1,431,501			4	±0
Valid votes	502,982	96.14	−0.87		
Invalid votes	20,168	3.86	+0.87		
Votes cast / turnout	523,150	65.03	+11.59		
Abstentions	281,311	34.97	−11.59		
Registered voters	804,461				
Sources
Footnotes: ^{1} People's Alliance–People's Democratic Party results are compared to Democratic Coalition totals in the 1979 election.; ^{2} Galician Nationalist Bloc–Galician Socialist Party results are compared to the combined totals of Galician Unity and the Galician National-Popular Bloc in the 1979 election.; ^{3} New Force results are compared to National Union totals in the 1979 election.

=== 1979 ===
Summary of the 1 March 1979 Senate of Spain election results in La Coruña
Parties and alliances	Popular vote			Seats	
Parties and alliances	Votes	%	±pp	Total	+/−
Union of the Democratic Centre (UCD)	563,823	45.85	+1.60	3	±0
Spanish Socialist Workers' Party (PSOE)^{1}	239,245	19.45	n/a	1	+1
Democratic Coalition (CD)^{2}	146,809	11.94	−1.15	0	±0
Galician Unity (PG–POG–PSG)	89,976	7.32	New	0	±0
Galician National-Popular Bloc (BNPG)	78,827	6.41	+1.79	0	±0
Communist Party of Spain (PCE)^{1}	66,091	5.37	n/a	0	±0
National Union (UN)	12,656	1.03	New	0	±0
Party of Labour of Spain (PTE)	6,439	0.52	New	0	±0
Spanish Phalanx–Falangist Unity (FE–UF)	4,811	0.39	New	0	±0
Revolutionary Communist League (LCR)	4,086	0.33	New	0	±0
Workers' Communist Party (PCT)	3,491	0.28	New	0	±0
Union for the Freedom of Speech (ULE)	2,732	0.22	New	0	±0
Communist Movement of Galicia–Organization of Communist Left (MCG–OIC)^{1}	2,424	0.20	n/a	0	±0
Galician Democratic Candidacy (Independents) (CDG)^{1}	n/a	n/a	n/a	0	−1
Blank ballots	8,433	1.98			
Total	1,229,843			4	±0
Valid votes	425,602	97.01			
Invalid votes	13,110	2.99			
Votes cast / turnout	438,712	53.44			
Abstentions	382,162	46.56			
Registered voters	820,874				
Sources
Footnotes: ^{1} Within the Galician Democratic Candidacy alliance in the 1977 election.; ^{2} Democratic Coalition results are compared to People's Alliance totals in the 1977 election.

=== 1977 ===
Summary of the 15 June 1977 Senate of Spain election results in La Coruña
Parties and alliances	Popular vote			Seats	
Parties and alliances	Votes	%	±pp	Total	+/−
Union of the Democratic Centre (UCD)	574,091	44.25	n/a	3	n/a
Galician Democratic Candidacy (CDG)	334,759	25.80	n/a	1	n/a
People's Alliance (AP)	169,823	13.09	n/a	0	n/a
Democratic Socialist Alliance (ASDCI)	63,371	4.88	n/a	0	n/a
Galician National-Popular Bloc (BNPG)	59,897	4.62	n/a	0	n/a
People's Socialist Party–Socialist Unity (PSP–US)	51,898	4.00	n/a	0	n/a
Galician Democratic Party (PDG)	28,073	2.16	n/a	0	n/a
Spanish Social Reform (RSE)	15,371	1.18	n/a	0	n/a
Blank ballots			n/a		
Total	1,297,283			4	n/a
Valid votes			n/a		
Invalid votes			n/a		
Votes cast / turnout			n/a		
Abstentions			n/a		
Registered voters	731,499				

== Bibliography ==
- Ley 1/1977, de 4 de enero, para la Reforma Política (Fundamental Law 1/1977). Official State Gazette (in Spanish). 4 January 1977. BOE-A-1977-165.
- Real Decreto-ley 20/1977, de 18 de marzo, sobre Normas Electorales (Royal Decree-Law 20/1977). Official State Gazette (in Spanish). 18 March 1977. BOE-A-1977-7445.
- Constitución Española (Constitution). Official State Gazette (in Spanish). 27 December 1978. BOE-A-1978-31229.
- Ley Orgánica 5/1985, de 19 de junio, del Régimen Electoral General (Organic Law 5/1985). Official State Gazette (in Spanish). 19 June 1985. BOE-A-1985-11672.
- Carreras de Odriozola, Albert; Tafunell Sambola, Xavier (2005) [1989]. Estadísticas históricas de España, siglos XIX-XX (PDF) (in Spanish). Vol. 1 (II ed.). Bilbao: Fundación BBVA. pp. 1072–1097. ISBN 84-96515-00-1. Archived from the original (PDF) on 24 September 2015.
