= Traditionalist Communion (2001) =

Traditionalist Communion Comunión Tradicionalista
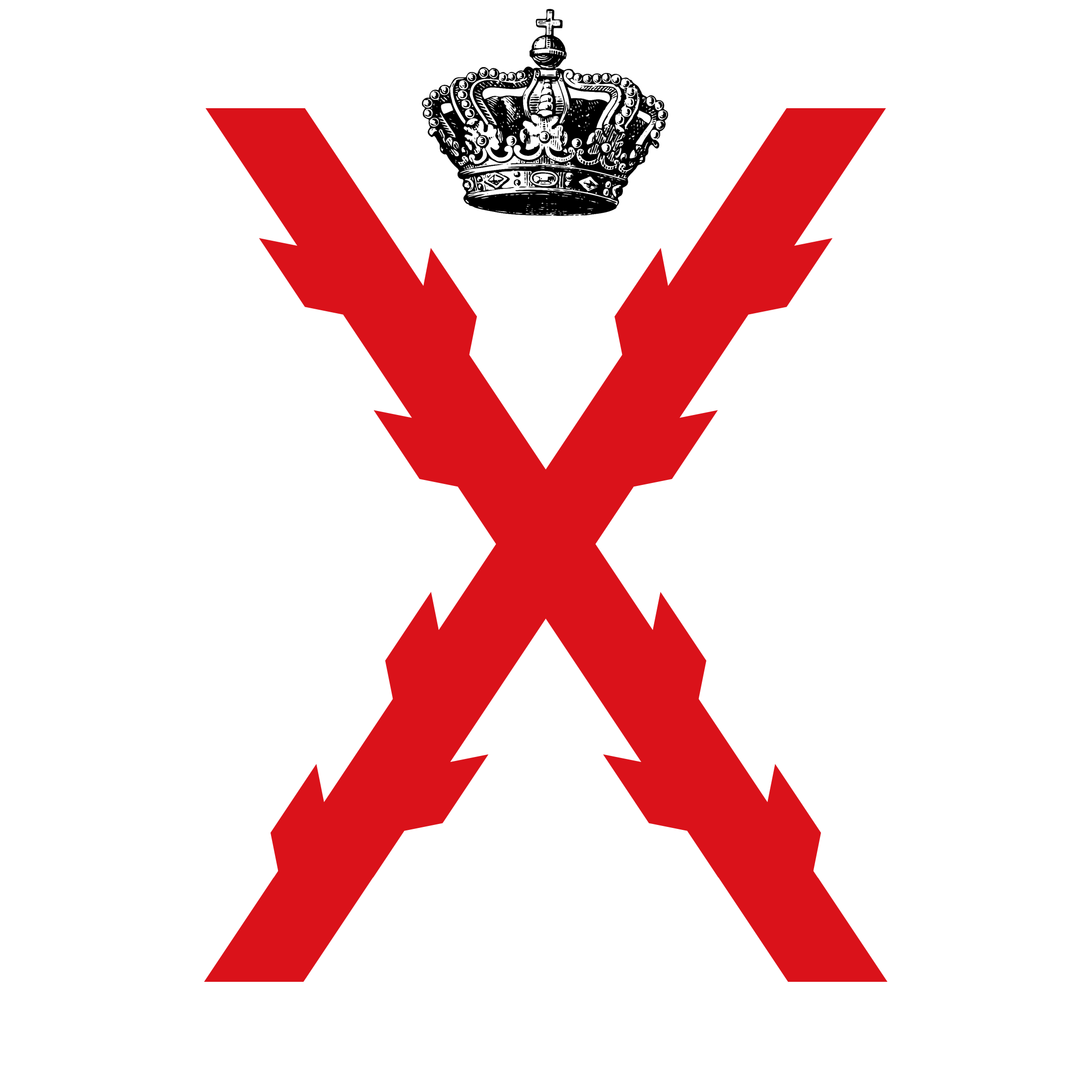
- Leader: Sixto Enrique de Borbón
- Secretary: Vacant
- Founded: 2001
- Split from: Traditionalist Carlist Communion
- Preceded by: Traditionalist Communion; Traditionalist Communion (1975)
- Newspaper: La Esperanza
- Women's wing: Margaritas
- Ideology: Carlism; Traditionalism; Monarchism; Panhispanism
- Religion: Traditionalist Catholicism
- Slogan: Dios, patria y rey (God, Fatherland and King)
- Anthem: March of Oriamendi

Party flag

Website
- www.carlismo.es

The Traditionalist Communion (Spanish: Comunión Tradicionalista, CT) is a Spanish political group rooted in Carlism, headed by the prince Sixto Enrique of Borbón and organized around his political secretariat.

== History ==
The organization claims continuity from the Traditionalist Communion reorganised in 1975 and its earlier historical antecedents. It was formed by Carlists who separated from the Traditionalist Communion Carlist Party (CTC), established in 1986, following the departure of former supporters of Sixto Enrique.

In 2001, Sixto Enrique appointed Rafael Gambra, a Carlist thinker and historic leader, as head of his Political Secretariat. Following Gambra's death in 2004, Miguel Ayuso, took over until 2010, when José Miguel Gambra, Rafael's son, succeeded him. José Miguel Gambra stepped down in 2021 but remained active in the organization.

The immediate roots of the group can be traced to the Traditionalist Youth of Spain (JTE), formed in the late 1990s under Rafael Gambra's doctrinal guidance. This group originated from youth circles split from the CTC and drew inspiration from the earlier Association of Traditionalist Youth (AJT). In 2001, Gambra gathered young people to "rebuild the Traditionalist Communion and persuade the Flagbearer's nephews to embrace the Cause’s principles."

In a Carlist event at the Cerro de los Ángeles in 2002, Gambra outlined why Carlists should recognize Don Sixto. The speech was well-received by some but ignored by others.

The CTC has not officially recognized Don Sixto. In 2008, Javier Garisoain, a leader of the CTC, stated that Don Sixto "is not the king of Spain, nor does anyone claim he is," criticizing his lack of communication with their governing board. While affirming doctrinal alignment, Garisoain expressed concerns about the group becoming "a political arm of Lefebvrism in Spain" and criticized its use of the name "Traditionalist Communion," claiming it belonged to the CTC.

In 2010, the group legally registered the Traditionalist Candidacy with headquarters in El Espinar. On December 8, 2020, La Esperanza was launched as a digital newspaper, continuing the legacy of the Carlist daily published in Madrid between 1844 and 1874.

== Ideology ==
The organization professes adherence to the "centuries-old teachings of the Catholic Church concerning the ultimate ends of human society and the moral norms its members must follow." Its goals include achieving Catholic unity in Spain, establishing a confessional government, and rejecting "the social doctrines of religious modernism," particularly those stemming from the Second Vatican Council.

The group advocates for preserving the natural constitution of Spain as inherited through tradition. It seeks to maintain national unity and independence while respecting regional autonomy as expressed in traditional laws. It opposes both separatism and extreme nationalism, asserting that the homeland is not an end in itself but serves higher divine purposes.

Additionally, the group aims to restore and preserve the liberties of subordinate societies, such as guilds, corporations, brotherhoods, municipalities, regions, and kingdoms, provided they align with natural law and Church teachings. It rejects statism and socialism that centralizes and homogenizes society.

The group's doctrinal framework is elaborated in The Traditional Society and Its Enemies (2019), authored by José Miguel Gambra, who served as Political Secretary to Sixto Enrique for 11 years.

== Notable Members ==
=== Historical members ===
- Rafael Gambra Ciudad: Philosophy professor and Political Secretary to Sixto Enrique from 2001 to 2004.
- Alberto Ruiz de Galarreta Mocoroa (alias Manuel de Santa Cruz): Navy medical colonel, writer, and historian of Carlism..
- José Arturo Márquez de Prado: Former National Requeté Leader and Political Secretary under Sixto Enrique since 1975.

=== Current members ===
- Miguel Ayuso Torres: Professor of Political Science and Constitutional Law, Political Secretary from 2004 to 2010.
- José Miguel Gambra Gutiérrez: Professor emeritus of Logic, Political Secretary from 2010 to 2021.
- Ricardo Marques Dip: Supreme Court Judge in São Paulo, professor, and delegate for Sixto Enrique in Brazil.
- Luis María de Ruschi: Canon lawyer and government consultant in Argentina.
- Juan Andrés Oria de Rueda Salgueiro: Forestry Botany professor specializing in mycology and flora conservation.
- Rodrigo Fernández Diez: Law historian and former professor, dismissed for anti-feminist stances.

== Bibliography ==
- Ferrari Cortés, Juan Luis (2015). El pensamiento político de la revista Verbo (PDF) (PhD). Madrid: Universidad Nacional de Educación a Distancia.
- García Riol, Daniel Jesus (2016). La resistencia tradicionalista a la renovación ideológica del Carlismo (1965-1973) (PDF). Tesis doctoral. UNED.
