= Galician Democratic Candidacy =

Galician Democratic Candidacy Candidatura Democrática Gallega
- Founded: 1977
- Dissolved: 1979
- Ideology: Galicianism; Progressivism; Galician autonomy
- Political position: Centre to Left

The Galician Democratic Candidacy (Galician: Candidatura Democrática Galega) was a centre-left, autonomist and galicianist electoral list in Galicia, contesting the 1977 Spanish Senate election in the constituencies of La Coruña, Orense and Pontevedra and the 1979 Spanish Senate election in Pontevedra.

== Composition ==
The coalition brought together various personalities from the galicianist center-left and received the support of the Spanish Socialist Workers' Party (PSOE), which only ran alone in the province of Lugo, where there was no CDG list. In 1977 CDG was supported by the PSOE, Communist Party of Galicia (PCG), Galician Socialist Party (PSG), Galician People's Party (PPG) and the Communist Movement of Galicia (MCG).

In the 1979 elections the coalition was dissolved, but the independent Pontevedra senator Valentín Paz Andrade ran a list of independents with the same name in his district.

== Results ==
A Coruña
Manuel Iglesias Corral (Independent)	122,578 votes	Elected
Carlos-Amable Baliñas Fernández (Independent)	111,019 votes	Not Elected
Sebastián Martínez-Risco Macías (Independent)	101,162 votes	Not Elected
Pontevedra
Valentín Paz Andrade (Independent)	67,207 votes	Elected
Francisco Fernández del Riego (Galician Socialist Party)	64,244 votes	Not Elected
Fernando Alonso Amat (Independent)	62,733 votes	Not Elected
Ourense
Celso Montero Rodríguez (PSOE)	26,925 votes	Elected

The coalition was the second most voted list in all three provinces, elected a senator in each In 1979 the independent list in Pontevedra led by Valentín Paz Andrade only got 26,426 votes and no seats.
