= Carlist Traditionalist Communion =

Carlist Traditionalist Communion Comunión Tradicionalista Carlista
- President: Javier Garisoain Otero
- Secretary: Javier Mª Pérez-Roldán
- Founded: 1986
- Headquarters: C/ Zurbano 71, Bajo (Madrid)
- Youth wing: Jóvenes por España
- Ideology: Carlism; Foralism; Traditionalism; Monarchism; Panhispanism
- Religion: Roman Catholicism
- Anthem: Oriamendi

Website
- www.carlistas.es

The Carlist Traditionalist Communion (Spanish: "Comunión Tradicionalista Carlista" (CTC)) is a Spanish political movement and former political party established in 1986 during the “Carlist Unity Congress” held in San Lorenzo de El Escorial (Madrid). It unified several traditionalist Carlist groups dissatisfied with the leftist direction of the Carlist Party under Carlos Hugo de Borbón-Parma.

The name derives from the historical political party of Carlism, Traditionalist Communion with the addition of Carlist (Traditionalist-Carlist), a designation occasionally used during the 1930s at the initiative of Don Alfonso Carlos.

The Congress brought together three distinct political parties: Catholic-Monarchist Communion: Linked to the General Zumalacárregui Study Center of Francisco Elías de Tejada, based in Madrid.

Carlist Union: Composed of Carloctavists and supporters of the Regency of Estella, primarily active in Vizcaya and Catalonia.

Traditionalist Communion: Representing former followers of Javier de Borbón-Parma, with a presence in Valencia, Seville, Madrid, and Asturias.

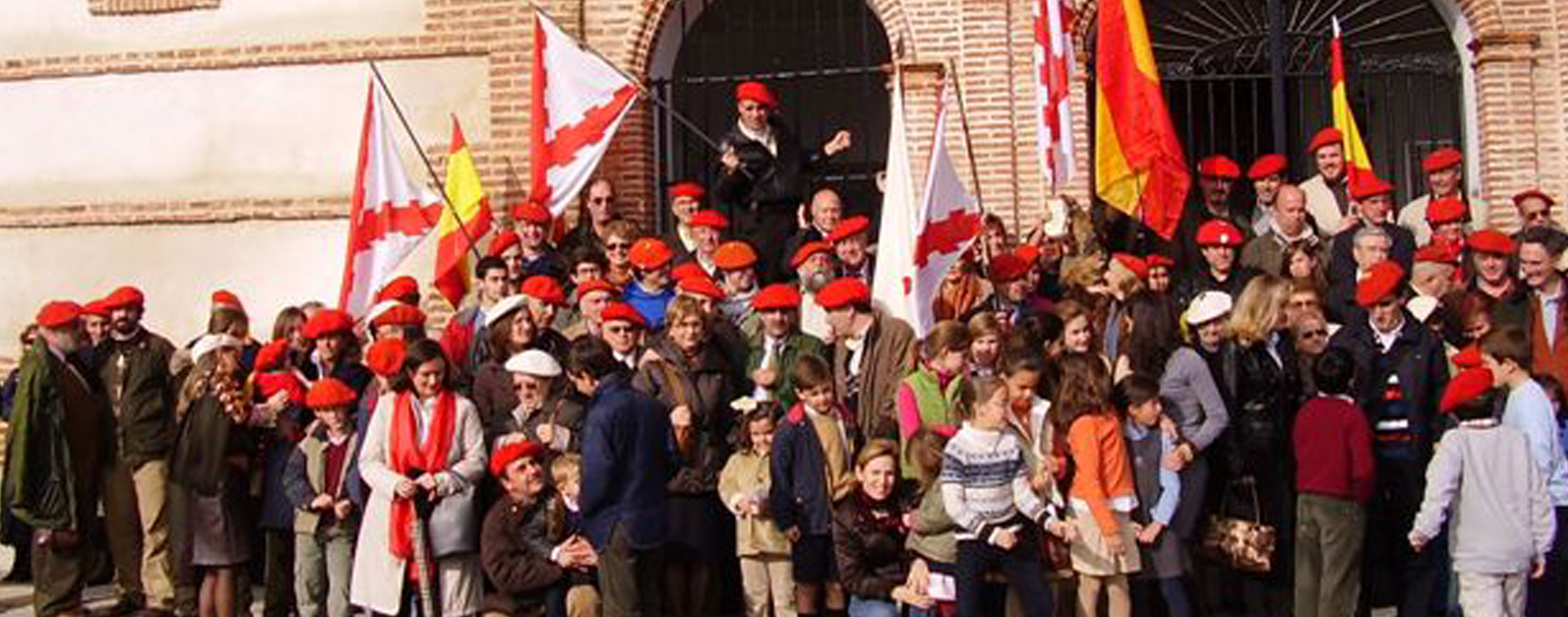
Celebration of the Feast of Christ the King in Getafe

In 1996, the faction loyal to Sixto Enrique de Borbón was expelled from the CTC. In 2000, they reconstituted their own political organization under his leadership, reclaiming the name Traditionalist Communion.

== Ideology ==
The CTC adheres to Carlism's historic motto: “God, Fatherland, Fueros, King.” It preserves Carlist symbols, such as the Cross of Saint Andrew, the Oriamendi March, and the traditional red or white beret.

The CTC advocates a "natural" social organization inspired by Spain's political traditions, structured around kingdoms and territories developed during the Reconquista. It proposes replacing autonomous statutes with a foral system respecting subsidiarity. Political parties would be eliminated in favor of an organic system of direct representation.

As a confessional Catholic group, the CTC bases its political action on the Church's Social Doctrine and the principle “Nothing without God.” This perspective applies a Catholic worldview to all aspects of social life, opposing divorce, abortion, euthanasia, same-sex marriage, and secular education in public schools.

=== Dynastic question ===
The CTC defines itself as monarchist and legitimist but does not currently recognize any claimant as king. The last officially acknowledged legitimate Carlist king was Alfonso Carlos I, who died in 1936.

In 2016, its governing board issued a declaration maintaining neutrality between Carlos Javier de Borbón Parma and his uncle Sixto Enrique.

=== Economic policy ===
The CTC justifies its program based on the principles of the Church's Social Doctrine, although it lacks a clear roadmap in economic matters. There is some division regarding capitalism and the market economy, with considerable tensions present (one side aligns more with a program inspired by Falangist principles).

Those who are more favorable to free-market theories from the Chicago School and the Austrian School have been accused of infiltrating the party. In fact, some of them, now in VOX, have been accused of consolidating a paleo-libertarian caucus.

The Austrians are more inclined to follow figures such as Rubén Manso Olivar, Miguel Anxo Bastos, and Jesús Huerta de Soto. On the other hand, the opposing faction draws inspiration from economist Daniel Marín Arribas, researcher Felisa Turuleta, and tax advisor Javier de Miguel Marqués.

Two digital media outlets are notably involved in this tension. The faction more favorable to the market is supported by the newspaper Navarra Confidencial, while the faction more critical of libertarianism is aligned with the Asociación Editorial Tradicionalista, which advocates for distancing itself from the former. Both outlets were founded by individuals who at some point have held or currently hold responsibilities within the CTC.

== Structure and activities ==
The CTC operates with a structure based on a governing board, whose current president, since October 2022, is Javier Garisoain, and its secretary general is Javier Mª Pérez Roldán. This Governing Board is formed through the National Congress. There are Carlist circles and groups in various Spanish cities, such as Madrid, Barcelona, Bilbao, Valencia, Pamplona, Seville, Liria (Valencia), and others, maintaining connections with traditionalist Catholic groups in other countries. It also has a youth association, called Cruz de Borgoña (Burgundy Cross), which organizes annual youth camps, and publishes a bi-monthly magazine called Ahora Información. Along with other organizations, it is linked to the Liga Tradicionalista (Traditionalist League).

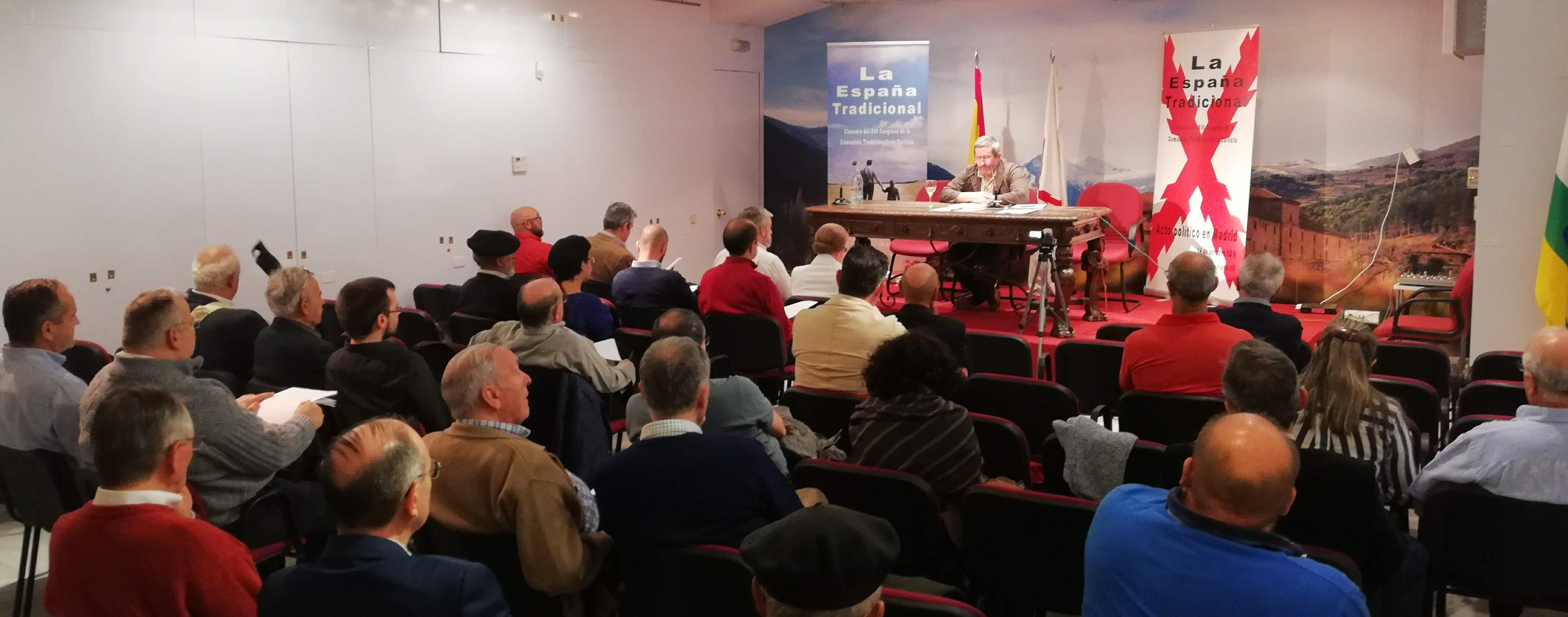
13th congress of the CTC, celebrated in Madrid in October 2018

The CTC has participated in various protests against the policies of José Luis Rodríguez Zapatero's government: opposing same-sex marriage (2005), the Organic Law on Education (2006), negotiations with ETA in Pamplona (2007), and the expansion of the Abortion Law (October 17, 2009), among others.

On December 28, 2012, the CTC was one of the entities organizing "pro-life" rallies in several locations across Spain, including Madrid, Barcelona, Pamplona, Valencia, Valladolid, Santander, Zaragoza, Seville, Granada, and Jaén. Other organizing entities included far-right parties and organizations such as Alternativa Española (AES), Derecha Navarra y Española (DNE), the Cruz de San Andrés association, and the Foro Arbil. The manifesto received support from 48 other associations.

== See also ==
- Tradicionalist Communion
- Traditionalist Communion (2001)

== Bibliography ==
- García Riol, Daniel Jesus (2016). La resistencia tradicionalista a la renovación ideológica del Carlismo (1965-1973). Tesis doctoral inédita. Universidad Nacional de Educación a Distancia. p. 564. Archived from the original on 2 March 2021.

== External sites ==
- Sitio web oficial de la Comunión Tradicionalista Carlista
- Sitio web de la asociación juvenil 'Cruz de Borgoña'
- Sitio web del periódico digital Ahora Información
