= 2003 Spanish local elections in Andalusia =

This article presents the results breakdown of the local elections held in Andalusia on 25 May 2003. The following tables show detailed results in the autonomous community's most populous municipalities, sorted alphabetically.

== City control ==
The following table lists party control in the most populous municipalities, including provincial capitals (highlighted in bold). Gains for a party are highlighted in that party's colour.

Municipality	Population	Previous control	New control
Alcalá de Guadaíra	58,351	Spanish Socialist Workers' Party of Andalusia (PSOE–A)	Spanish Socialist Workers' Party of Andalusia (PSOE–A)
Algeciras	106,710	Andalusian Party (PA)	Spanish Socialist Workers' Party of Andalusia (PSOE–A)
**Almería**	173,338	Spanish Socialist Workers' Party of Andalusia (PSOE–A)	People's Party (PP)
Antequera	41,197	Spanish Socialist Workers' Party of Andalusia (PSOE–A)	Spanish Socialist Workers' Party of Andalusia (PSOE–A)
Benalmádena	35,946	Independent Group of Benalmádena (GIB–BOLIN)	Independent Group of Benalmádena (GIB–BOLIN)
**Cádiz**	136,236	People's Party (PP)	People's Party (PP)
Chiclana de la Frontera	63,719	Spanish Socialist Workers' Party of Andalusia (PSOE–A)	Spanish Socialist Workers' Party of Andalusia (PSOE–A)
**Córdoba**	314,805	United Left/The Greens–Assembly for Andalusia (IULV–CA)	United Left/The Greens–Assembly for Andalusia (IULV–CA)
Dos Hermanas	103,282	Spanish Socialist Workers' Party of Andalusia (PSOE–A)	Spanish Socialist Workers' Party of Andalusia (PSOE–A)
Écija	37,900	Andalusian Party (PA)	Spanish Socialist Workers' Party of Andalusia (PSOE–A)
El Ejido	57,063	People's Party (PP)	People's Party (PP) (PdeAL in 2005)
El Puerto de Santa María	77,747	Portuese Independents (IP)	Portuese Independents (IP)
Fuengirola	53,270	People's Party (PP)	People's Party (PP)
**Granada**	240,522	Spanish Socialist Workers' Party of Andalusia (PSOE–A)	People's Party (PP)
**Huelva**	140,862	People's Party (PP)	People's Party (PP)
**Jaén**	112,921	People's Party (PP)	People's Party (PP)
Jerez de la Frontera	187,087	Socialist Party of Andalusia (PSA)	People's Party (PP) (PSOE–A in 2005)
La Línea de la Concepción	60,951	People's Party (PP)	People's Party (PP)
Linares	57,800	Spanish Socialist Workers' Party of Andalusia (PSOE–A)	Spanish Socialist Workers' Party of Andalusia (PSOE–A)
**Málaga**	535,686	People's Party (PP)	People's Party (PP)
Marbella	115,871	Liberal Independent Group (GIL)	Liberal Independent Group (GIL) (Note: As a result of Operation Malaya, the Council of Ministers dissolved the City Council of Marbella in April 2006 and appointed a multi-party caretaker government until 2007.)
Morón de la Frontera	27,786	Spanish Socialist Workers' Party of Andalusia (PSOE–A)	People's Party (PP)
Motril	51,928	Spanish Socialist Workers' Party of Andalusia (PSOE–A)	People's Party (PP) (PSOE–A in 2005)
Ronda	34,470	Spanish Socialist Workers' Party of Andalusia (PSOE–A)	Spanish Socialist Workers' Party of Andalusia (PSOE–A)
San Fernando	88,333	Andalusian Party (PA)	Andalusian Party (PA)
Sanlúcar de Barrameda	61,908	People's Party (PP)	People's Party (PP)
**Seville**	704,114	Spanish Socialist Workers' Party of Andalusia (PSOE–A)	Spanish Socialist Workers' Party of Andalusia (PSOE–A)
Utrera	45,947	Spanish Socialist Workers' Party of Andalusia (PSOE–A)	Andalusian Party (PA)
Vélez-Málaga	57,457	Spanish Socialist Workers' Party of Andalusia (PSOE–A)	Spanish Socialist Workers' Party of Andalusia (PSOE–A)

== Municipalities ==
=== Alcalá de Guadaíra ===
Population: 58,351

← Summary of the 25 May 2003 City Council of Alcalá de Guadaíra election results →
Parties and alliances	Popular vote			Seats	
Parties and alliances	Votes	%	±pp	Total	+/−
Spanish Socialist Workers' Party of Andalusia (PSOE–A)	15,665	60.79	+4.22	17	+2
People's Party (PP)	5,263	20.42	+0.23	5	±0
United Left/The Greens–Assembly for Andalusia (IULV–CA)	2,688	10.43	−0.32	2	−1
Andalusian Party (PA)	1,520	5.90	−2.17	1	−1
Blank ballots	635	2.46	+0.57		
Total	25,771			25	±0
Valid votes	25,771	99.36	+0.32		
Invalid votes	166	0.64	−0.32		
Votes cast / turnout	25,937	54.56	−1.65		
Abstentions	21,604	45.44	+1.65		
Registered voters	47,541				

=== Algeciras ===
Population: 106,710

← Summary of the 25 May 2003 City Council of Algeciras election results →
Parties and alliances	Popular vote			Seats	
Parties and alliances	Votes	%	±pp	Total	+/−
Spanish Socialist Workers' Party of Andalusia (PSOE–A)	13,503	32.09	+6.35	10	+3
Andalusian Party (PA)	9,865	23.44	−18.09	7	−5
People's Party (PP)	9,708	23.07	+3.26	7	+1
United Left/The Greens–Assembly for Andalusia (IULV–CA)	5,010	11.90	+5.36	3	+1
Andalusia Assembly (A)	1,653	3.93	New	0	±0
Socialist Party of Andalusia (PSA)	821	1.95	New	0	±0
Algeciras Local Independent Group (AGIL)	714	1.70	New	0	±0
Christian Positivist Party (PPCr)	144	0.34	New	0	±0
Blank ballots	666	1.58	+0.06		
Total	42,084			27	±0
Valid votes	42,084	99.56	+0.21		
Invalid votes	187	0.44	−0.21		
Votes cast / turnout	42,271	49.64	−2.33		
Abstentions	42,877	50.36	+2.33		
Registered voters	85,148				

=== Almería ===
Population: 173,338

← Summary of the 25 May 2003 City Council of Almería election results →
Parties and alliances	Popular vote			Seats	
Parties and alliances	Votes	%	±pp	Total	+/−
People's Party (PP)	31,461	38.36	−7.42	11	−2
Spanish Socialist Workers' Party of Andalusia (PSOE–A)^{1}	26,477	32.29	−8.24	10	−2
Independent Group for Almería (GIAL)	13,823	16.86	New	5	+5
United Left/The Greens–Assembly for Andalusia (IULV–CA)	4,859	5.93	−1.92	1	−1
Andalusian Party (PA)	2,011	2.45	±0.00	0	±0
Left Assembly–Initiative for Almería (A–IZ)	924	1.13	New	0	±0
The Greens of Andalusia (LVA)^{2}	695	0.85	+0.08	0	±0
Socialist Party of Andalusia (PSA)	381	0.46	New	0	±0
The Republicans (REP)	97	0.12	New	0	±0
Democratic and Social Centre (CDS)	71	0.09	−0.08	0	±0
Humanist Party (PH)	63	0.08	−0.01	0	±0
Blank ballots	1,146	1.40	−0.13		
Total	82,008			27	±0
Valid votes	82,008	99.71	+0.26		
Invalid votes	242	0.29	−0.26		
Votes cast / turnout	82,250	61.81	+4.59		
Abstentions	50,818	38.19	−4.59		
Registered voters	133,068				
Sources
Footnotes: ^{1} Spanish Socialist Workers' Party of Andalusia results are compared to the combined totals of Spanish Socialist Workers' Party of Andalusia and Democratic Party of the New Left–Andalusia in the 1999 election.; ^{2} The Greens of Andalusia results are compared to The Greens–Andalusian Left totals in the 1999 election.

=== Antequera ===
Population: 41,197

← Summary of the 25 May 2003 City Council of Antequera election results →
Parties and alliances	Popular vote			Seats	
Parties and alliances	Votes	%	±pp	Total	+/−
Spanish Socialist Workers' Party of Andalusia (PSOE–A)	10,217	48.10	−9.50	11	−2
People's Party (PP)	6,216	29.27	+3.75	6	+1
United Left/The Greens–Assembly for Andalusia (IULV–CA)	2,297	10.81	+1.52	2	±0
Andalusian Party (PA)	2,098	9.88	+3.65	2	+1
Socialist Party of Andalusia (PSA)	221	1.04	New	0	±0
Blank ballots	191	0.90	−0.09		
Total	21,240			21	±0
Valid votes	21,240	99.46	+0.11		
Invalid votes	116	0.54	−0.11		
Votes cast / turnout	21,356	63.54	−3.46		
Abstentions	12,253	36.46	+3.46		
Registered voters	33,609				

=== Benalmádena ===
Population: 35,946

← Summary of the 25 May 2003 City Council of Benalmádena election results →
Parties and alliances	Popular vote			Seats	
Parties and alliances	Votes	%	±pp	Total	+/−
Independent Group of Benalmádena (GIB–BOLIN)	5,995	41.63	+0.70	10	−1
Spanish Socialist Workers' Party of Andalusia (PSOE–A)	2,834	19.68	+1.56	5	+1
People's Party (PP)	2,829	19.65	+3.53	4	±0
United Left/The Greens–Assembly for Andalusia (IULV–CA)	1,311	9.10	+3.06	2	+1
Andalusian Party (PA)	457	3.17	−0.39	0	±0
Ecologist Greens of Benalmádena (VEB)	396	2.75	New	0	±0
The Greens of Andalusia (LVA)	283	1.97	−1.26	0	±0
Socialist Party of Andalusia (PSA)	69	0.48	New	0	±0
Liberal Independent Group (GIL)	n/a	n/a	−6.93	0	−1
Blank ballots	226	1.57	+0.22		
Total	14,400			21	±0
Valid votes	14,400	99.57	−0.13		
Invalid votes	62	0.43	+0.13		
Votes cast / turnout	14,462	56.00	−2.39		
Abstentions	11,362	44.00	+2.39		
Registered voters	25,824				

=== Cádiz ===
Population: 136,236

← Summary of the 25 May 2003 City Council of Cádiz election results →
Parties and alliances	Popular vote			Seats	
Parties and alliances	Votes	%	±pp	Total	+/−
People's Party (PP)	40,667	60.09	−1.93	18	±0
Spanish Socialist Workers' Party of Andalusia (PSOE–A)	19,395	28.66	+7.10	8	+2
United Left/The Greens–Assembly for Andalusia (IULV–CA)	3,698	5.46	−2.76	1	−1
Andalusian Party (PA)	1,379	2.04	−3.03	0	−1
The Greens of Andalusia (LVA)^{1}	1,021	1.51	−0.48	0	±0
Socialist Party of Andalusia (PSA)	458	0.68	New	0	±0
Blank ballots	1,054	1.56	+0.06		
Total	67,672			27	±0
Valid votes	67,672	99.53	+0.22		
Invalid votes	321	0.47	−0.22		
Votes cast / turnout	67,993	59.10	+1.94		
Abstentions	47,047	40.90	−1.94		
Registered voters	115,040				
Sources
Footnotes: ^{1} The Greens of Andalusia results are compared to The Greens–Andalusian Left totals in the 1999 election.

=== Chiclana de la Frontera ===
Population: 63,719

← Summary of the 25 May 2003 City Council of Chiclana de la Frontera election results →
Parties and alliances	Popular vote			Seats	
Parties and alliances	Votes	%	±pp	Total	+/−
Spanish Socialist Workers' Party of Andalusia (PSOE–A)	13,108	58.04	−4.19	16	−3
People's Party (PP)	4,956	21.94	+1.63	6	±0
Socialist Party of Andalusia (PSA)	1,851	8.20	New	2	+2
United Left/The Greens–Assembly for Andalusia (IULV–CA)	1,213	5.37	+0.83	1	+1
Andalusian Party (PA)	753	3.33	−1.37	0	±0
Party of Self-employed, Retirees and Independents (EL–PAPI)	399	1.77	New	0	±0
Blank ballots	304	1.35	+0.15		
Total	22,584			25	±0
Valid votes	22,584	99.70	+0.51		
Invalid votes	69	0.30	−0.51		
Votes cast / turnout	22,653	45.62	+0.32		
Abstentions	27,007	54.38	−0.32		
Registered voters	49,660				

=== Córdoba ===
Population: 314,805

← Summary of the 25 May 2003 City Council of Córdoba election results →
Parties and alliances	Popular vote			Seats	
Parties and alliances	Votes	%	±pp	Total	+/−
United Left/The Greens–Assembly for Andalusia (IULV–CA)	66,545	41.88	+13.26	13	+4
People's Party (PP)	62,882	39.58	−6.80	12	−2
Spanish Socialist Workers' Party of Andalusia (PSOE–A)	20,456	12.87	−6.43	4	−2
Andalusian Party (PA)	3,200	2.01	+0.44	0	±0
The Greens of Andalusia (LVA)^{1}	1,455	0.92	+0.16	0	±0
Socialist Party of Andalusia (PSA)	459	0.29	New	0	±0
Communist Party of the Peoples of Spain (PCPE)	367	0.23	New	0	±0
Another Democracy is Possible (ODeP)	218	0.14	New	0	±0
Humanist Party (PH)	109	0.07	−0.02	0	±0
Spanish Democratic Party (PADE)	0	0.00	New	0	±0
Blank ballots	3,192	2.01	+0.43		
Total	158,883			29	±0
Valid votes	158,883	99.60	+0.13		
Invalid votes	633	0.40	−0.13		
Votes cast / turnout	159,516	61.57	−0.91		
Abstentions	99,578	38.43	+0.91		
Registered voters	259,094				
Sources
Footnotes: ^{1} The Greens of Andalusia results are compared to The Greens–Andalusian Left totals in the 1999 election.

=== Dos Hermanas ===
Population: 103,282

← Summary of the 25 May 2003 City Council of Dos Hermanas election results →
Parties and alliances	Popular vote			Seats	
Parties and alliances	Votes	%	±pp	Total	+/−
Spanish Socialist Workers' Party of Andalusia (PSOE–A)	25,970	60.87	+3.55	18	+2
People's Party (PP)	7,575	17.76	−1.37	5	±0
United Left/The Greens–Assembly for Andalusia (IULV–CA)	4,168	9.77	−2.04	3	±0
Andalusian Party (PA)	2,510	5.88	−0.12	1	±0
Socialist Party of Andalusia–Andalusian Left (PSA–IA)	1,224	2.87	New	0	±0
The Greens of Andalusia (LVA)^{1}	517	1.21	−2.38	0	±0
Blank ballots	699	1.64	−0.30		
Total	42,663			27	+2
Valid votes	42,663	99.62	+0.32		
Invalid votes	163	0.38	−0.32		
Votes cast / turnout	42,826	52.06	+1.01		
Abstentions	39,442	47.94	−1.01		
Registered voters	82,268				
Sources
Footnotes: ^{1} The Greens of Andalusia results are compared to Andalusian Left–The Greens totals in the 1999 election.

=== Écija ===
Population: 37,900

← Summary of the 25 May 2003 City Council of Écija election results →
Parties and alliances	Popular vote			Seats	
Parties and alliances	Votes	%	±pp	Total	+/−
Andalusian Party (PA)	6,136	29.77	−17.57	7	−4
Spanish Socialist Workers' Party of Andalusia (PSOE–A)	5,841	28.34	−3.39	7	±0
United Left/The Greens–Assembly for Andalusia (IULV–CA)	2,750	13.34	+7.55	3	+2
People's Party (PP)	2,298	11.15	+0.45	2	±0
Independent Ecijan Socialist Party (PSEI)	1,931	9.37	New	2	+2
Andalusian Unity of Independent Parties (UAPI)	1,003	4.87	New	0	±0
Socialist Party of Andalusia–New Andalusian Green Left (PSA–NIVA)	317	1.54	New	0	±0
The Greens of Andalusia (LVA)	99	0.48	New	0	±0
Blank ballots	238	1.15	−0.11		
Total	20,613			21	±0
Valid votes	20,613	99.53	+0.22		
Invalid votes	98	0.47	−0.22		
Votes cast / turnout	20,711	69.88	+0.94		
Abstentions	8,927	30.12	−0.94		
Registered voters	29,638				

=== El Ejido ===
Population: 57,063

← Summary of the 25 May 2003 City Council of El Ejido election results →
Parties and alliances	Popular vote			Seats	
Parties and alliances	Votes	%	±pp	Total	+/−
People's Party (PP)	15,213	66.88	+13.70	18	+4
Spanish Socialist Workers' Party of Andalusia (PSOE–A)	5,820	25.59	−10.39	7	−3
United Left/The Greens–Assembly for Andalusia (IULV–CA)	753	3.31	−1.82	0	−1
Andalusian Party (PA)	558	2.45	−1.06	0	±0
Left Assembly–Initiative for El Ejido (A–IZ)	70	0.31	New	0	±0
Blank ballots	333	1.46	−0.41		
Total	22,747			25	±0
Valid votes	22,747	99.61	+0.69		
Invalid votes	88	0.39	−0.69		
Votes cast / turnout	22,835	58.99	+5.94		
Abstentions	15,872	41.01	−5.94		
Registered voters	38,707				

=== El Puerto de Santa María ===
Population: 77,747

← Summary of the 25 May 2003 City Council of El Puerto de Santa María election results →
Parties and alliances	Popular vote			Seats	
Parties and alliances	Votes	%	±pp	Total	+/−
Portuese Independents (IP)	10,301	32.48	−6.35	10	±0
People's Party (PP)	8,804	27.76	+8.71	8	+3
Spanish Socialist Workers' Party of Andalusia (PSOE–A)	4,992	15.74	−1.99	4	±0
United Left/The Greens–Assembly for Andalusia (IULV–CA)	3,844	12.12	−2.71	3	−1
Party of El Puerto de Santa María (PEPSM)	1,119	3.53	New	0	±0
Andalusian Party (PA)	1,006	3.17	−4.42	0	−2
Socialist Party of Andalusia (PSA)	946	2.98	New	0	±0
The Greens of Andalusia (LVA)	292	0.92	New	0	±0
Blank ballots	413	1.30	−0.41		
Total	31,717			25	±0
Valid votes	31,717	99.70	+0.35		
Invalid votes	96	0.30	−0.35		
Votes cast / turnout	31,813	51.45	−0.69		
Abstentions	30,020	48.55	+0.69		
Registered voters	61,833				

=== Fuengirola ===
Population: 53,270

← Summary of the 25 May 2003 City Council of Fuengirola election results →
Parties and alliances	Popular vote			Seats	
Parties and alliances	Votes	%	±pp	Total	+/−
People's Party (PP)	13,250	54.88	+10.98	16	+5
Spanish Socialist Workers' Party of Andalusia (PSOE–A)	7,313	30.29	+1.64	8	+1
Andalusian Party (PA)	1,365	5.65	+1.78	1	+1
United Left/The Greens–Assembly for Andalusia (IULV–CA)	857	3.55	−0.68	0	±0
The Greens of Andalusia (LVA)	489	2.03	+0.39	0	±0
Platform of Fuengirola Action (APF)	474	1.96	New	0	±0
Andalusian Reformist Alternative (ARA)	86	0.36	−0.14	0	±0
Liberal Independent Group (GIL)	n/a	n/a	−13.73	0	−3
Blank ballots	310	1.28	+0.02		
Total	24,144			25	+4
Valid votes	24,144	99.47	+0.28		
Invalid votes	128	0.53	−0.28		
Votes cast / turnout	24,272	64.31	−0.70		
Abstentions	13,469	35.69	+0.70		
Registered voters	37,741				

=== Granada ===
Population: 240,522

← Summary of the 25 May 2003 City Council of Granada election results →
Parties and alliances	Popular vote			Seats	
Parties and alliances	Votes	%	±pp	Total	+/−
People's Party (PP)	58,985	48.08	+3.14	14	+1
Spanish Socialist Workers' Party of Andalusia (PSOE–A)	43,444	35.41	−2.10	11	±0
United Left/The Greens–Assembly for Andalusia (IULV–CA)	9,055	7.38	−0.40	2	±0
Socialist Party of Andalusia (PSA)	2,908	2.37	New	0	±0
The Greens of Andalusia (LVA)^{1}	2,665	2.17	+1.25	0	±0
Andalusian Party (PA)	2,244	1.83	−3.33	0	−1
Humanist Party (PH)	147	0.12	±0.00	0	±0
Another Democracy is Possible (ODeP)	143	0.12	New	0	±0
Andalusia Assembly (A)	83	0.07	+0.02	0	±0
Blank ballots	3,014	2.46	−0.20		
Total	122,688			27	±0
Valid votes	122,688	99.48	+0.12		
Invalid votes	641	0.52	−0.12		
Votes cast / turnout	123,329	62.04	+1.43		
Abstentions	75,446	37.96	−1.43		
Registered voters	198,775				
Sources
Footnotes: ^{1} The Greens of Andalusia results are compared to The Greens–Andalusian Left totals in the 1999 election.

=== Huelva ===
Population: 140,862

← Summary of the 25 May 2003 City Council of Huelva election results →
Parties and alliances	Popular vote			Seats	
Parties and alliances	Votes	%	±pp	Total	+/−
People's Party (PP)	34,505	53.32	−7.50	16	−2
Spanish Socialist Workers' Party of Andalusia (PSOE–A)	21,793	33.68	+5.93	10	+2
United Left/The Greens–Assembly for Andalusia (IULV–CA)	3,952	6.11	−0.02	1	±0
Andalusian Party (PA)	2,191	3.39	+0.09	0	±0
The Greens of Andalusia (LVA)^{1}	1,122	1.73	+1.13	0	±0
Blank ballots	1,151	1.78	+0.51		
Total	64,714			27	±0
Valid votes	64,714	99.56	+0.10		
Invalid votes	285	0.44	−0.10		
Votes cast / turnout	64,999	56.36	−0.72		
Abstentions	50,327	43.64	+0.72		
Registered voters	115,326				
Sources
Footnotes: ^{1} The Greens of Andalusia results are compared to The Greens–Andalusian Left totals in the 1999 election.

=== Jaén ===
Population: 112,921

← Summary of the 25 May 2003 City Council of Jaén election results →
Parties and alliances	Popular vote			Seats	
Parties and alliances	Votes	%	±pp	Total	+/−
People's Party (PP)	27,858	46.81	−0.13	14	±0
Spanish Socialist Workers' Party of Andalusia (PSOE–A)	22,948	38.56	+2.21	11	±0
United Left/The Greens–Assembly for Andalusia (IULV–CA)	4,312	7.25	−1.43	2	±0
Andalusian Party (PA)	1,963	3.30	−1.48	0	±0
Family and Life Party (PFyV)	503	0.85	New	0	±0
The Greens of Andalusia (LVA)^{1}	496	0.83	+0.42	0	±0
Socialist Party of Andalusia (PSA)	299	0.50	New	0	±0
Blank ballots	1,128	1.90	−0.54		
Total	59,507			27	±0
Valid votes	59,507	99.49	+0.37		
Invalid votes	308	0.51	−0.37		
Votes cast / turnout	59,815	66.47	+6.19		
Abstentions	30,171	33.53	−6.19		
Registered voters	89,986				
Sources
Footnotes: ^{1} The Greens of Andalusia results are compared to The Greens–Andalusian Left totals in the 1999 election.

=== Jerez de la Frontera ===
Population: 187,087

← Summary of the 25 May 2003 City Council of Jerez de la Frontera election results →
Parties and alliances	Popular vote			Seats	
Parties and alliances	Votes	%	±pp	Total	+/−
Spanish Socialist Workers' Party of Andalusia (PSOE–A)	29,184	32.22	+9.67	9	+3
Socialist Party of Andalusia (PSA)	27,219	30.05	New	9	+9
People's Party (PP)	24,977	27.58	+2.84	8	+1
United Left/The Greens–Assembly for Andalusia (IULV–CA)	4,536	5.01	−1.62	1	−1
Andalusian Party (PA)	1,983	2.19	−38.40	0	−12
Jerezan Progressive Initiative (IPJ)	1,310	1.45	New	0	±0
Humanist Party (PH)	242	0.27	−0.01	0	±0
Blank ballots	1,123	1.24	−0.26		
Total	90,574			27	±0
Valid votes	90,574	99.67	+0.17		
Invalid votes	296	0.33	−0.17		
Votes cast / turnout	90,870	60.55	+5.43		
Abstentions	59,210	39.45	−5.43		
Registered voters	150,080				

=== La Línea de la Concepción ===
Population: 60,951

← Summary of the 25 May 2003 City Council of La Línea de la Concepción election results →
Parties and alliances	Popular vote			Seats	
Parties and alliances	Votes	%	±pp	Total	+/−
People's Party (PP)	21,713	69.15	+55.42	20	+16
Spanish Socialist Workers' Party of Andalusia (PSOE–A)	6,201	19.75	+4.49	5	+1
United Left/The Greens–Assembly for Andalusia (IULV–CA)	963	3.07	+1.05	0	±0
Citizens for La Línea (CLL)	809	2.58	New	0	±0
Socialist Party of Justice (PSJ)	687	2.19	New	0	±0
Andalusian Party (PA)	655	2.09	−1.13	0	±0
Socialist Party of Andalusia (PSA)	120	0.38	New	0	±0
Liberal Independent Group (GIL)	n/a	n/a	−56.80	0	−17
Blank ballots	253	0.81	±0.00		
Total	31,401			25	±0
Valid votes	31,401	99.67	+0.47		
Invalid votes	104	0.33	−0.47		
Votes cast / turnout	31,505	66.37	−5.97		
Abstentions	15,965	33.63	+5.97		
Registered voters	47,470				

=== Linares ===
Population: 57,800

← Summary of the 25 May 2003 City Council of Linares election results →
Parties and alliances	Popular vote			Seats	
Parties and alliances	Votes	%	±pp	Total	+/−
Spanish Socialist Workers' Party of Andalusia (PSOE–A)	15,936	56.11	+15.10	15	+4
People's Party (PP)	7,344	25.86	−9.70	7	−2
United Left/The Greens–Assembly for Andalusia (IULV–CA)	2,653	9.34	−2.80	2	−1
Andalusian Party (PA)	1,640	5.77	−2.18	1	−1
Socialist Party of Andalusia (PSA)	440	1.55	New	0	±0
Blank ballots	390	1.37	−0.10		
Total	28,403			25	±0
Valid votes	28,403	99.60	+0.48		
Invalid votes	115	0.40	−0.48		
Votes cast / turnout	28,518	63.33	+0.31		
Abstentions	16,514	36.67	−0.31		
Registered voters	45,032				

=== Málaga ===
Population: 535,686

← Summary of the 25 May 2003 City Council of Málaga election results →
Parties and alliances	Popular vote			Seats	
Parties and alliances	Votes	%	±pp	Total	+/−
People's Party (PP)	120,302	49.13	−6.59	17	−2
Spanish Socialist Workers' Party of Andalusia (PSOE–A)	83,706	34.19	+6.65	12	+3
United Left/The Greens–Assembly for Andalusia (IULV–CA)	20,444	8.35	−0.88	2	−1
Andalusian Party (PA)	10,034	4.10	+0.44	0	±0
The Greens of Andalusia (LVA)	4,204	1.72	+0.17	0	±0
Socialist Party of Andalusia (PSA)	948	0.39	New	0	±0
National Union (UN)	547	0.22	+0.16	0	±0
Humanist Party (PH)	254	0.10	−0.05	0	±0
Another Democracy is Possible (ODeP)	235	0.10	New	0	±0
Authentic Phalanx (FA)	216	0.09	New	0	±0
Blank ballots	3,957	1.62	−0.13		
Total	244,847			31	±0
Valid votes	244,847	99.64	+0.16		
Invalid votes	882	0.36	−0.16		
Votes cast / turnout	245,729	56.27	+3.85		
Abstentions	190,938	43.73	−3.85		
Registered voters	436,667				

=== Marbella ===
Population: 115,871

← Summary of the 25 May 2003 City Council of Marbella election results →
Parties and alliances	Popular vote			Seats	
Parties and alliances	Votes	%	±pp	Total	+/−
Liberal Independent Group (GIL)	21,978	47.09	−5.21	15	±0
Spanish Socialist Workers' Party of Andalusia (PSOE–A)	7,895	16.92	−3.36	5	±0
People's Party (PP)	7,016	15.03	+2.58	4	+1
Andalusian Party (PA)	4,546	9.74	+2.84	3	+1
Independent Group for Marbella and San Pedro de Alcántara (GIM–SP)	1,723	3.69	New	0	±0
United Left/The Greens–Assembly for Andalusia (IULV–CA)	1,162	2.49	−1.30	0	±0
Green Ecologist Alternative of Marbella and San Pedro de Alcántara (AEV)	659	1.41	−1.24	0	±0
Andalusian Socialist Bloc (BSA)	570	1.22	New	0	±0
Independent Reformist Party of Marbella and San Pedro (PRIMSP)	267	0.57	+0.16	0	±0
Socialist Party of Andalusia (PSA)	142	0.30	New	0	±0
Humanist Party (PH)	55	0.12	+0.01	0	±0
Blank ballots	661	1.42	+0.19		
Total	46,674			27	+2
Valid votes	46,674	99.60	+0.08		
Invalid votes	186	0.40	−0.08		
Votes cast / turnout	46,860	58.21	−1.87		
Abstentions	33,637	41.79	+1.87		
Registered voters	80,497				

=== Morón de la Frontera ===
Population: 27,786

← Summary of the 25 May 2003 City Council of Morón de la Frontera election results →
Parties and alliances	Popular vote			Seats	
Parties and alliances	Votes	%	±pp	Total	+/−
People's Party (PP)	5,382	37.38	+14.13	9	+4
Spanish Socialist Workers' Party of Andalusia (PSOE–A)^{1}	4,525	31.43	−19.34	7	−5
United Left/The Greens–Assembly for Andalusia (IULV–CA)	2,283	15.86	+0.32	3	±0
Andalusian Party (PA)	1,301	9.04	+1.58	2	+1
Andalusian Coalition of Independents (COAM)	620	4.31	New	0	±0
Blank ballots	287	1.99	−1.00		
Total	14,398			21	±0
Valid votes	14,398	99.15	+0.10		
Invalid votes	124	0.85	−0.10		
Votes cast / turnout	14,522	63.72	+7.90		
Abstentions	8,270	36.28	−7.90		
Registered voters	22,792				
Sources
Footnotes: ^{1} Spanish Socialist Workers' Party of Andalusia results are compared to the combined totals of Spanish Socialist Workers' Party of Andalusia and Democratic Party of the New Left–Andalusia in the 1999 election.

=== Motril ===
Population: 51,928

← Summary of the 25 May 2003 City Council of Motril election results →
Parties and alliances	Popular vote			Seats	
Parties and alliances	Votes	%	±pp	Total	+/−
Spanish Socialist Workers' Party of Andalusia (PSOE–A)^{1}	8,464	33.76	−7.57	9	−2
People's Party (PP)	8,430	33.62	+4.08	9	+1
United Left/The Greens–Assembly for Andalusia (IULV–CA)	2,580	10.29	+2.23	2	±0
Independent Group for the Municipal Autonomy of Torrenueva (GRITO)	1,836	7.32	+3.26	2	+2
Andalusian Party (PA)	1,812	7.23	−0.65	2	±0
Independent Motrilenian Democratic Group (ADMI)	1,304	5.20	−2.48	1	−1
Party of Independent and Solidarity Citizens (PACIS)	333	1.33	New	0	±0
Blank ballots	312	1.24	−0.21		
Total	25,071			25	±0
Valid votes	25,071	99.50	+0.49		
Invalid votes	127	0.50	−0.49		
Votes cast / turnout	25,198	61.42	+3.02		
Abstentions	15,830	38.58	−3.02		
Registered voters	41,028				
Sources
Footnotes: ^{1} Spanish Socialist Workers' Party of Andalusia results are compared to the combined totals of Spanish Socialist Workers' Party of Andalusia and Democratic Party of the New Left–Andalusia in the 1999 election.

=== Ronda ===
Population: 34,470

← Summary of the 25 May 2003 City Council of Ronda election results →
Parties and alliances	Popular vote			Seats	
Parties and alliances	Votes	%	±pp	Total	+/−
Spanish Socialist Workers' Party of Andalusia (PSOE–A)^{1}	6,016	32.51	−0.10	8	+1
Liberal Independent Group (GIL)	4,385	23.70	−11.70	5	−3
Andalusian Party (PA)	3,525	19.05	+8.50	4	+2
People's Party (PP)	2,928	15.82	+2.60	3	±0
United Left/The Greens–Assembly for Andalusia (IULV–CA)	936	5.06	−2.17	1	±0
Initiative for Ronda (IRonda)	443	2.39	New	0	±0
Blank ballots	273	1.48	+0.48		
Total	18,506			21	±0
Valid votes	18,506	99.51	−0.06		
Invalid votes	91	0.49	+0.06		
Votes cast / turnout	18,597	65.84	−3.14		
Abstentions	9,650	34.16	+3.14		
Registered voters	28,247				

=== San Fernando ===
Population: 88,333

← Summary of the 25 May 2003 City Council of San Fernando election results →
Parties and alliances	Popular vote			Seats	
Parties and alliances	Votes	%	±pp	Total	+/−
Andalusian Party (PA)	12,638	35.02	−20.34	10	−5
People's Party (PP)	9,840	27.27	+5.06	8	+2
Spanish Socialist Workers' Party of Andalusia (PSOE–A)	9,483	26.28	+10.35	7	+3
United Left/The Greens–Assembly for Andalusia (IULV–CA)	1,757	4.87	+0.03	0	±0
Socialist Party of Andalusia (PSA)	1,333	3.69	New	0	±0
Party of Self-employed, Retirees and Independents (EL–PAPI)	559	1.55	New	0	±0
Blank ballots	477	1.32	−0.33		
Total	36,087			25	±0
Valid votes	36,087	99.67	+0.54		
Invalid votes	119	0.33	−0.54		
Votes cast / turnout	36,206	51.49	−4.98		
Abstentions	34,111	48.51	+4.98		
Registered voters	70,317				

=== Sanlúcar de Barrameda ===
Population: 61,908

← Summary of the 25 May 2003 City Council of Sanlúcar de Barrameda election results →
Parties and alliances	Popular vote			Seats	
Parties and alliances	Votes	%	±pp	Total	+/−
People's Party (PP)	11,946	44.27	+18.68	13	+6
Spanish Socialist Workers' Party of Andalusia (PSOE–A)	4,398	16.30	−10.56	5	−2
Sanluquenian Alternative (AS)	2,252	8.35	New	2	+2
United Left/The Greens–Assembly for Andalusia (IULV–CA)	1,992	7.38	−2.97	2	−1
Andalusian Party (PA)	1,757	6.51	−16.26	2	−4
Algaida for the Development of Sanlúcar (ALDESA)	1,455	5.39	New	1	+1
Independent Sanluquenians (SI)	1,181	4.38	−2.95	0	−2
Andalusian Left (IA)	780	2.89	New	0	±0
Socialist Party of Andalusia (PSA)	507	1.88	New	0	±0
Everyone for Sanlúcar (TpS)	329	1.22	New	0	±0
Blank ballots	388	1.44	−0.03		
Total	26,985			25	±0
Valid votes	26,985	99.55	+0.36		
Invalid votes	123	0.45	−0.36		
Votes cast / turnout	27,108	55.90	+0.55		
Abstentions	21,384	44.10	−0.55		
Registered voters	48,492				

=== Seville ===
Population: 704,114

=== Utrera ===
Population: 45,947

← Summary of the 25 May 2003 City Council of Utrera election results →
Parties and alliances	Popular vote			Seats	
Parties and alliances	Votes	%	±pp	Total	+/−
Andalusian Party (PA)	9,279	39.26	+18.57	10	+6
Spanish Socialist Workers' Party of Andalusia (PSOE–A)	8,025	33.96	−9.79	8	−2
People's Party (PP)	3,422	14.48	−3.52	3	−1
United Left/The Greens–Assembly for Andalusia (IULV–CA)	1,180	4.99	−4.59	0	−2
Independent Group Pro-City Council of El Palmar de Troya (GIP)	1,090	4.61	−0.72	0	−1
Socialist Party of Andalusia (PSA)	394	1.67	New	0	±0
Blank ballots	242	1.02	−0.35		
Total	23,632			21	±0
Valid votes	23,632	99.74	+0.37		
Invalid votes	61	0.26	−0.37		
Votes cast / turnout	23,693	65.13	+3.56		
Abstentions	12,686	34.87	−3.56		
Registered voters	36,379				

=== Vélez-Málaga ===
Population: 57,457

← Summary of the 25 May 2003 City Council of Vélez-Málaga election results →
Parties and alliances	Popular vote			Seats	
Parties and alliances	Votes	%	±pp	Total	+/−
Spanish Socialist Workers' Party of Andalusia (PSOE–A)^{1}	10,578	35.10	−3.86	10	±0
People's Party (PP)	8,300	27.54	+9.27	7	+2
Andalusian Party–Pro-Torre del Mar Municipality Indep. Group (PA–GIPMTM)^{2}	5,575	18.50	−10.51	5	−3
United Left/The Greens–Assembly for Andalusia (IULV–CA)	2,570	8.53	+0.73	2	±0
Socialist Party of Andalusia (PSA)	1,542	5.12	New	1	+1
The Greens of Andalusia (LVA)	1,091	3.62	+2.25	0	±0
Humanist Party (PH)	50	0.17	+0.05	0	±0
Blank ballots	428	1.42	−1.49		
Total	30,134			25	±0
Valid votes	30,134	99.34	+0.38		
Invalid votes	200	0.66	−0.38		
Votes cast / turnout	30,334	64.59	+1.81		
Abstentions	16,627	35.41	−1.81		
Registered voters	46,961				
Sources
Footnotes: ^{1} Spanish Socialist Workers' Party of Andalusia results are compared to the combined totals of Spanish Socialist Workers' Party of Andalusia and Democratic Party of the New Left–Andalusia in the 1999 election.; ^{2} Andalusian Party–Pro-Torre del Mar Municipality Indep. Group results are compared to the combined totals of Pro-Torre del Mar Municipality Independent Group and Andalusian Party in the 1999 election.
