= 1999 Spanish local elections in Andalusia =

This article presents the results breakdown of the local elections held in Andalusia on 13 June 1999. The following tables show detailed results in the autonomous community's most populous municipalities, sorted alphabetically.

== City control ==
The following table lists party control in the most populous municipalities, including provincial capitals (highlighted in bold). Gains for a party are highlighted in that party's colour.

Municipality	Population	Previous control	New control
Alcalá de Guadaíra	56,244	Spanish Socialist Workers' Party of Andalusia (PSOE–A)	Spanish Socialist Workers' Party of Andalusia (PSOE–A)
Algeciras	101,972	Andalusian Party (PA)	Andalusian Party (PA)
**Almería**	168,025	People's Party (PP)	Spanish Socialist Workers' Party of Andalusia (PSOE–A)
Antequera	40,239	Spanish Socialist Workers' Party of Andalusia (PSOE–A)	Spanish Socialist Workers' Party of Andalusia (PSOE–A)
Benalmádena	28,479	Independent Group of Benalmádena (GIB)	Independent Group of Benalmádena (GIB)
**Cádiz**	143,129	People's Party (PP)	People's Party (PP)
Chiclana de la Frontera	55,494	Spanish Socialist Workers' Party of Andalusia (PSOE–A)	Spanish Socialist Workers' Party of Andalusia (PSOE–A)
**Córdoba**	309,961	People's Party (PP)	United Left/The Greens–Assembly for Andalusia (IULV–CA)
Dos Hermanas	92,506	Spanish Socialist Workers' Party of Andalusia (PSOE–A)	Spanish Socialist Workers' Party of Andalusia (PSOE–A)
Écija	37,113	Andalusian Party (PA)	Andalusian Party (PA)
El Ejido	50,170	People's Party (PP)	People's Party (PP)
El Puerto de Santa María	73,728	Portuese Independents (IP)	Portuese Independents (IP)
Fuengirola	44,924	People's Party (PP)	People's Party (PP)
**Granada**	241,471	People's Party (PP)	Spanish Socialist Workers' Party of Andalusia (PSOE–A)
**Huelva**	139,991	People's Party (PP)	People's Party (PP)
**Jaén**	107,184	People's Party (PP)	People's Party (PP)
Jerez de la Frontera	181,602	Andalusian Party (PA)	Andalusian Party (PA) (PSA in 2001)
La Línea de la Concepción	59,629	People's Party (PP)	Liberal Independent Group (GIL) (PP in 2002)
Linares	58,410	People's Party (PP)	Spanish Socialist Workers' Party of Andalusia (PSOE–A)
**Málaga**	528,079	People's Party (PP)	People's Party (PP)
Marbella	98,377	Liberal Independent Group (GIL)	Liberal Independent Group (GIL)
Morón de la Frontera	28,232	Spanish Socialist Workers' Party of Andalusia (PSOE–A)	Spanish Socialist Workers' Party of Andalusia (PSOE–A)
Motril	50,025	Spanish Socialist Workers' Party of Andalusia (PSOE–A)	Spanish Socialist Workers' Party of Andalusia (PSOE–A)
Ronda	33,806	Spanish Socialist Workers' Party of Andalusia (PSOE–A)	People's Party (PP) (PSOE–A in 2001)
San Fernando	84,014	Andalusian Party (PA)	Andalusian Party (PA)
Sanlúcar de Barrameda	61,382	Spanish Socialist Workers' Party of Andalusia (PSOE–A)	People's Party (PP)
**Seville**	701,927	People's Party (PP)	Spanish Socialist Workers' Party of Andalusia (PSOE–A)
Utrera	45,947	Spanish Socialist Workers' Party of Andalusia (PSOE–A)	Spanish Socialist Workers' Party of Andalusia (PSOE–A)
Vélez-Málaga	53,816	Spanish Socialist Workers' Party of Andalusia (PSOE–A)	Spanish Socialist Workers' Party of Andalusia (PSOE–A)

== Municipalities ==
=== Alcalá de Guadaíra ===
Population: 56,244

← Summary of the 13 June 1999 City Council of Alcalá de Guadaíra election results →
Parties and alliances	Popular vote			Seats	
Parties and alliances	Votes	%	±pp	Total	+/−
Spanish Socialist Workers' Party of Andalusia (PSOE–A)	14,484	56.57	+16.69	15	+4
People's Party (PP)	5,168	20.19	−1.89	5	−1
United Left/The Greens–Assembly for Andalusia (IULV–CA)	2,751	10.75	−10.70	3	−2
Andalusian Party (PA)	2,066	8.07	−5.23	2	−1
Workers' Citizen Group of Alcalá de Guadaíra (ACT–AG)	382	1.49	New	0	±0
Democratic Party of the New Left–Andalusia (PDNI–A)	268	1.05	New	0	±0
Blank ballots	483	1.89	+0.45		
Total	25,602			25	±0
Valid votes	25,602	99.04	−0.64		
Invalid votes	247	0.96	+0.64		
Votes cast / turnout	25,849	56.21	−6.52		
Abstentions	20,140	43.79	+6.52		
Registered voters	45,989				

=== Algeciras ===
Population: 101,972

← Summary of the 13 June 1999 City Council of Algeciras election results →
Parties and alliances	Popular vote			Seats	
Parties and alliances	Votes	%	±pp	Total	+/−
Andalusian Party (PA)^{1}	16,969	41.53	−3.98	12	±0
Spanish Socialist Workers' Party of Andalusia (PSOE–A)	10,519	25.74	+7.92	7	+2
People's Party (PP)	8,095	19.81	−6.67	6	−2
United Left/The Greens–Assembly for Andalusia (IULV–CA)	2,672	6.54	−0.65	2	±0
People's Voice (VP)	1,477	3.61	New	0	±0
The Voice of Algeciras (VA)	429	1.05	New	0	±0
Humanist Party (PH)	80	0.20	New	0	±0
Blank ballots	622	1.52	+0.80		
Total	40,863			27	±0
Valid votes	40,863	99.35	−0.28		
Invalid votes	269	0.65	+0.28		
Votes cast / turnout	41,132	51.97	−6.32		
Abstentions	38,017	48.03	+6.32		
Registered voters	79,149				
Sources
Footnotes: ^{1} Andalusian Party results are compared to the combined totals of Andalusian Progress Party and Andalusian Party in the 1995 election.

=== Almería ===
Population: 168,025

← Summary of the 13 June 1999 City Council of Almería election results →
Parties and alliances	Popular vote			Seats	
Parties and alliances	Votes	%	±pp	Total	+/−
People's Party (PP)	35,169	45.78	−3.03	13	−1
Spanish Socialist Workers' Party of Andalusia (PSOE–A)	30,932	40.26	+9.28	12	+3
United Left/The Greens–Assembly for Andalusia (IULV–CA)	6,028	7.85	−7.74	2	−2
Andalusian Party (PA)^{1}	1,886	2.45	+0.49	0	±0
The Greens–Andalusian Left (LV–IA)	595	0.77	New	0	±0
Almerian Regionalist Union (URAL)	542	0.71	New	0	±0
Democratic Party of the New Left–Andalusia (PDNI–A)	207	0.27	New	0	±0
Centrist Union–Democratic and Social Centre (UC–CDS)	134	0.17	New	0	±0
The Phalanx (FE)	92	0.12	New	0	±0
Humanist Party (PH)	70	0.09	New	0	±0
Blank ballots	1,172	1.53	+0.58		
Total	76,827			27	±0
Valid votes	76,827	99.45	−0.27		
Invalid votes	422	0.55	+0.27		
Votes cast / turnout	77,249	57.22	−8.98		
Abstentions	57,754	42.78	+8.98		
Registered voters	135,003				
Sources
Footnotes: ^{1} Andalusian Party results are compared to the combined totals of Andalusian Party and Andalusian Progress Party in the 1995 election.

=== Antequera ===
Population: 40,239

← Summary of the 13 June 1999 City Council of Antequera election results →
Parties and alliances	Popular vote			Seats	
Parties and alliances	Votes	%	±pp	Total	+/−
Spanish Socialist Workers' Party of Andalusia (PSOE–A)	12,627	57.60	+13.61	13	+3
People's Party (PP)	5,594	25.52	−7.43	5	−3
United Left/The Greens–Assembly for Andalusia (IULV–CA)	2,037	9.29	−6.96	2	−1
Andalusian Party (PA)	1,365	6.23	+5.14	1	+1
Andalusian Nation (NA)	55	0.25	New	0	±0
Humanist Party (PH)	29	0.13	New	0	±0
Blank ballots	216	0.99	+0.15		
Total	21,923			21	±0
Valid votes	21,923	99.35	−0.22		
Invalid votes	144	0.65	+0.22		
Votes cast / turnout	22,067	67.00	−4.55		
Abstentions	10,870	33.00	+4.55		
Registered voters	32,937				

=== Benalmádena ===
Population: 28,479

← Summary of the 13 June 1999 City Council of Benalmádena election results →
Parties and alliances	Popular vote			Seats	
Parties and alliances	Votes	%	±pp	Total	+/−
Independent Group of Benalmádena (GIB)	5,251	40.93	+7.14	11	+3
Spanish Socialist Workers' Party of Andalusia (PSOE–A)	2,325	18.12	+0.51	4	±0
People's Party (PP)	2,068	16.12	−11.00	4	−2
Liberal Independent Group (GIL)	889	6.93	New	1	+1
United Left/The Greens–Assembly for Andalusia (IULV–CA)	775	6.04	−9.28	1	−2
Benalmádena People's Union (UPdB)	477	3.72	New	0	±0
Andalusian Party (PA)^{1}	457	3.56	+0.24	0	±0
The Greens of Benalmádena (LVB)	415	3.23	New	0	±0
Blank ballots	173	1.35	+0.28		
Total	12,830			21	±0
Valid votes	12,830	99.70	±0.00		
Invalid votes	38	0.30	±0.00		
Votes cast / turnout	12,868	58.39	−10.82		
Abstentions	9,169	41.61	+10.82		
Registered voters	22,037				
Sources
Footnotes: ^{1} Andalusian Party results are compared to the combined totals of Andalusian Party and Andalusian Progress Party in the 1995 election.

=== Cádiz ===
Population: 143,129

← Summary of the 13 June 1999 City Council of Cádiz election results →
Parties and alliances	Popular vote			Seats	
Parties and alliances	Votes	%	±pp	Total	+/−
People's Party (PP)	41,062	62.02	+12.97	18	+3
Spanish Socialist Workers' Party of Andalusia (PSOE–A)	14,271	21.56	−1.47	6	−1
United Left/The Greens–Assembly for Andalusia (IULV–CA)	5,443	8.22	−10.31	2	−3
Andalusian Party (PA)^{1}	3,357	5.07	+0.42	1	+1
The Greens–Andalusian Left (LV–IA)	679	1.03	New	0	±0
Andalusia Assembly (A)	165	0.25	New	0	±0
The Phalanx (FE)	124	0.19	New	0	±0
Humanist Party (PH)	114	0.17	New	0	±0
Blank ballots	992	1.50	+0.38		
Total	66,207			27	±0
Valid votes	66,207	99.31	−0.32		
Invalid votes	458	0.69	+0.32		
Votes cast / turnout	66,665	57.16	−6.78		
Abstentions	49,954	42.84	+6.78		
Registered voters	116,619				
Sources
Footnotes: ^{1} Andalusian Party results are compared to the combined totals of Andalusian Party and Andalusian Progress Party in the 1995 election.

=== Chiclana de la Frontera ===
Population: 55,494

← Summary of the 13 June 1999 City Council of Chiclana de la Frontera election results →
Parties and alliances	Popular vote			Seats	
Parties and alliances	Votes	%	±pp	Total	+/−
Spanish Socialist Workers' Party of Andalusia (PSOE–A)	11,997	62.23	+26.59	19	+9
People's Party (PP)	3,916	20.31	−12.28	6	−4
Andalusian Party (PA)^{1}	906	4.70	−3.00	0	−1
United Left/The Greens–Assembly for Andalusia (IULV–CA)	876	4.54	−8.31	0	−3
Independents for Chiclana (ICh)	574	2.98	New	0	±0
Citizen Collective (CLC)	401	2.08	−2.71	0	±0
Platform of Independents of Spain (PIE)	376	1.95	−3.47	0	−1
Blank ballots	232	1.20	+0.19		
Total	19,278			25	±0
Valid votes	19,278	99.19	−0.57		
Invalid votes	158	0.81	+0.57		
Votes cast / turnout	19,436	45.30	−9.23		
Abstentions	23,470	54.70	+9.23		
Registered voters	42,906				
Sources
Footnotes: ^{1} Andalusian Party results are compared to the combined totals of Andalusian Party and Andalusian Progress Party in the 1995 election.

=== Córdoba ===
Population: 309,961

← Summary of the 13 June 1999 City Council of Córdoba election results →
Parties and alliances	Popular vote			Seats	
Parties and alliances	Votes	%	±pp	Total	+/−
People's Party (PP)	71,651	46.38	+5.50	14	+1
United Left/The Greens–Assembly for Andalusia (IULV–CA)	44,215	28.62	−8.50	9	−2
Spanish Socialist Workers' Party of Andalusia (PSOE–A)	29,815	19.30	+1.93	6	+1
Andalusian Party (PA)^{1}	4,614	2.99	+0.20	0	±0
The Greens–Andalusian Left (LV–IA)	1,167	0.76	New	0	±0
Cordobese Citizen Candidacy (CCC)	276	0.18	New	0	±0
The Phalanx (FE)	156	0.10	New	0	±0
Humanist Party (PH)	139	0.09	New	0	±0
Blank ballots	2,444	1.58	+0.05		
Total	154,477			29	±0
Valid votes	154,477	99.47	−0.19		
Invalid votes	817	0.53	+0.19		
Votes cast / turnout	155,294	62.48	−0.43		
Abstentions	93,242	37.52	+0.43		
Registered voters	248,536				
Sources
Footnotes: ^{1} Andalusian Party results are compared to the combined totals of Andalusian Party and Andalusian Progress Party in the 1995 election.

=== Dos Hermanas ===
Population: 92,506

← Summary of the 13 June 1999 City Council of Dos Hermanas election results →
Parties and alliances	Popular vote			Seats	
Parties and alliances	Votes	%	±pp	Total	+/−
Spanish Socialist Workers' Party of Andalusia (PSOE–A)	21,255	57.32	+7.78	16	+3
People's Party (PP)	7,096	19.13	−3.51	5	−1
United Left/The Greens–Assembly for Andalusia (IULV–CA)	4,378	11.81	−10.82	3	−3
Andalusian Party (PA)^{1}	2,226	6.00	+2.19	1	+1
Andalusian Left–The Greens (IA–LV)	1,330	3.59	New	0	±0
Humanist Party (PH)	78	0.21	New	0	±0
Blank ballots	721	1.94	+0.56		
Total	37,084			25	±0
Valid votes	37,084	99.30	−0.48		
Invalid votes	260	0.70	+0.48		
Votes cast / turnout	37,344	51.05	−9.45		
Abstentions	35,813	48.95	+9.45		
Registered voters	73,157				
Sources
Footnotes: ^{1} Andalusian Party results are compared to the combined totals of Andalusian Party and Andalusian Progress Party in the 1995 election.

=== Écija ===
Population: 37,113

← Summary of the 13 June 1999 City Council of Écija election results →
Parties and alliances	Popular vote			Seats	
Parties and alliances	Votes	%	±pp	Total	+/−
Andalusian Party (PA)	9,515	47.34	+4.11	11	+1
Spanish Socialist Workers' Party of Andalusia (PSOE–A)	6,378	31.73	+2.77	7	+1
People's Party (PP)	2,150	10.70	−8.40	2	−2
United Left/The Greens–Assembly for Andalusia (IULV–CA)	1,164	5.79	−1.88	1	±0
Democratic Party of the New Left–Andalusia (PDNI–A)	640	3.18	New	0	±0
Blank ballots	253	1.26	+0.23		
Total	20,100			21	±0
Valid votes	20,100	99.31	−0.21		
Invalid votes	140	0.69	+0.21		
Votes cast / turnout	20,240	68.94	−3.06		
Abstentions	9,118	31.06	+3.06		
Registered voters	29,358				

=== El Ejido ===
Population: 50,170

← Summary of the 13 June 1999 City Council of El Ejido election results →
Parties and alliances	Popular vote			Seats	
Parties and alliances	Votes	%	±pp	Total	+/−
People's Party (PP)	10,178	53.18	+1.43	14	+2
Spanish Socialist Workers' Party of Andalusia (PSOE–A)	6,885	35.98	+4.44	10	+3
United Left/The Greens–Assembly for Andalusia (IULV–CA)	982	5.13	−3.95	1	−1
Andalusian Party (PA)^{1}	671	3.51	+1.06	0	±0
Humanist Party (PH)	63	0.33	New	0	±0
Blank ballots	358	1.87	+0.79		
Total	19,137			25	+4
Valid votes	19,137	98.92	−0.71		
Invalid votes	208	1.08	+0.71		
Votes cast / turnout	19,345	53.05	−5.71		
Abstentions	17,122	46.95	+5.71		
Registered voters	36,467				
Sources
Footnotes: ^{1} Andalusian Party results are compared to the combined totals of Andalusian Progress Party and Andalusian Party in the 1995 election.

=== El Puerto de Santa María ===
Population: 73,728

← Summary of the 13 June 1999 City Council of El Puerto de Santa María election results →
Parties and alliances	Popular vote			Seats	
Parties and alliances	Votes	%	±pp	Total	+/−
Portuese Independents (IP)	11,424	38.83	−19.04	10	−6
People's Party (PP)	5,605	19.05	+2.19	5	+1
Spanish Socialist Workers' Party of Andalusia (PSOE–A)	5,217	17.73	+7.39	4	+2
United Left/The Greens–Assembly for Andalusia (IULV–CA)	4,364	14.83	+4.16	4	+1
Andalusian Party (PA)^{1}	2,233	7.59	+5.29	2	+2
Humanist Party (PH)	72	0.24	New	0	±0
Blank ballots	502	1.71	+0.74		
Total	29,417			25	±0
Valid votes	29,417	99.35	−0.08		
Invalid votes	191	0.65	+0.08		
Votes cast / turnout	29,608	52.14	−4.71		
Abstentions	27,182	47.86	+4.71		
Registered voters	56,790				
Sources
Footnotes: ^{1} Andalusian Party results are compared to the combined totals of Andalusian Progress Party and Andalusian Party in the 1995 election.

=== Fuengirola ===
Population: 44,924

← Summary of the 13 June 1999 City Council of Fuengirola election results →
Parties and alliances	Popular vote			Seats	
Parties and alliances	Votes	%	±pp	Total	+/−
People's Party (PP)	9,890	43.90	−11.19	11	−3
Spanish Socialist Workers' Party of Andalusia (PSOE–A)	6,455	28.65	+9.17	7	+3
Liberal Independent Group (GIL)	3,093	13.73	New	3	+3
United Left/The Greens–Assembly for Andalusia (IULV–CA)	954	4.23	−4.85	0	−2
Andalusian Party (PA)	872	3.87	+1.39	0	±0
Independent Group of Fuengirola (GIF)	481	2.13	New	0	±0
The Greens of Fuengirola (LV)	369	1.64	New	0	±0
Andalusian Reformist Alternative (ARA)	112	0.50	New	0	±0
Humanist Party (PH)	20	0.09	New	0	±0
Platform of Independents of Spain (PIE)	n/a	n/a	−6.54	0	−1
Blank ballots	284	1.26	−0.05		
Total	22,530			21	±0
Valid votes	22,530	99.19	−0.28		
Invalid votes	184	0.81	+0.28		
Votes cast / turnout	22,714	65.01	−5.38		
Abstentions	12,226	34.99	+5.38		
Registered voters	34,940				

=== Granada ===
Population: 241,471

← Summary of the 13 June 1999 City Council of Granada election results →
Parties and alliances	Popular vote			Seats	
Parties and alliances	Votes	%	±pp	Total	+/−
People's Party (PP)	57,422	44.94	−6.74	13	−2
Spanish Socialist Workers' Party of Andalusia (PSOE–A)	47,931	37.51	+9.21	11	+3
United Left/The Greens–Assembly for Andalusia (IULV–CA)	9,936	7.78	−7.94	2	−2
Andalusian Party (PA)^{1}	6,590	5.16	+2.87	1	+1
The Greens–Andalusian Left (LV–IA)	1,181	0.92	New	0	±0
Centrist Union–Democratic and Social Centre (UC–CDS)	700	0.55	New	0	±0
The Phalanx (FE)	181	0.14	New	0	±0
Andalusian Nation (NA)	175	0.14	+0.04	0	±0
Humanist Party (PH)	149	0.12	New	0	±0
Andalusia Assembly (A)	121	0.09	New	0	±0
Blank ballots	3,402	2.66	+1.17		
Total	127,788			27	±0
Valid votes	127,788	99.36	−0.27		
Invalid votes	827	0.64	+0.27		
Votes cast / turnout	128,615	60.61	−6.02		
Abstentions	83,603	39.39	+6.02		
Registered voters	212,218				
Sources
Footnotes: ^{1} Andalusian Party results are compared to the combined totals of Andalusian Party and Andalusian Progress Party in the 1995 election.

=== Huelva ===
Population: 139,991

← Summary of the 13 June 1999 City Council of Huelva election results →
Parties and alliances	Popular vote			Seats	
Parties and alliances	Votes	%	±pp	Total	+/−
People's Party (PP)	40,215	60.82	+18.46	18	+6
Spanish Socialist Workers' Party of Andalusia (PSOE–A)	18,347	27.75	−9.74	8	−3
United Left/The Greens–Assembly for Andalusia (IULV–CA)	4,055	6.13	−8.69	1	−3
Andalusian Party (PA)	2,183	3.30	−0.54	0	±0
The Greens–Andalusian Left (LV–IA)	395	0.60	New	0	±0
Humanist Party (PH)	86	0.13	New	0	±0
Blank ballots	841	1.27	+0.15		
Total	66,122			27	±0
Valid votes	66,122	99.46	−0.28		
Invalid votes	362	0.54	+0.28		
Votes cast / turnout	66,484	57.08	−1.58		
Abstentions	49,995	42.92	+1.58		
Registered voters	116,479				

=== Jaén ===
Population: 107,184

← Summary of the 13 June 1999 City Council of Jaén election results →
Parties and alliances	Popular vote			Seats	
Parties and alliances	Votes	%	±pp	Total	+/−
People's Party (PP)	24,835	46.94	−5.72	14	−1
Spanish Socialist Workers' Party of Andalusia (PSOE–A)	19,231	36.35	+8.80	11	+3
United Left/The Greens–Assembly for Andalusia (IULV–CA)	4,593	8.68	−5.18	2	−2
Andalusian Party (PA)^{1}	2,530	4.78	+0.43	0	±0
The Greens–Andalusian Left (LV–IA)	216	0.41	New	0	±0
The Phalanx (FE)	112	0.21	New	0	±0
Humanist Party (PH)	98	0.19	New	0	±0
Blank ballots	1,290	2.44	+1.23		
Total	52,905			27	±0
Valid votes	52,905	99.12	−0.51		
Invalid votes	469	0.88	+0.51		
Votes cast / turnout	53,374	60.28	−11.35		
Abstentions	35,165	39.72	+11.35		
Registered voters	88,539				
Sources
Footnotes: ^{1} Andalusian Party results are compared to the combined totals of Andalusian Party and Andalusian Progress Party in the 1995 election.

=== Jerez de la Frontera ===
Population: 181,602

← Summary of the 13 June 1999 City Council of Jerez de la Frontera election results →
Parties and alliances	Popular vote			Seats	
Parties and alliances	Votes	%	±pp	Total	+/−
Andalusian Party (PA)^{1}	32,243	40.59	−1.76	12	±0
People's Party (PP)	19,657	24.74	−0.44	7	±0
Spanish Socialist Workers' Party of Andalusia (PSOE–A)	17,914	22.55	+2.76	6	+1
United Left/The Greens–Assembly for Andalusia (IULV–CA)	5,268	6.63	−4.37	2	−1
Andalusian Left–The Greens (IA–LV)	2,947	3.71	New	0	±0
Humanist Party (PH)	224	0.28	New	0	±0
Blank ballots	1,190	1.50	+0.57		
Total	79,443			27	±0
Valid votes	79,443	99.50	−0.14		
Invalid votes	398	0.50	+0.14		
Votes cast / turnout	79,841	55.12	−0.86		
Abstentions	65,018	44.88	+0.86		
Registered voters	144,859				
Sources
Footnotes: ^{1} Andalusian Party results are compared to the combined totals of Andalusian Progress Party and Andalusian Party in the 1995 election.

=== La Línea de la Concepción ===
Population: 59,629

← Summary of the 13 June 1999 City Council of La Línea de la Concepción election results →
Parties and alliances	Popular vote			Seats	
Parties and alliances	Votes	%	±pp	Total	+/−
Liberal Independent Group (GIL)	18,780	56.80	New	17	+17
Spanish Socialist Workers' Party of Andalusia (PSOE–A)	5,045	15.26	−14.94	4	−5
People's Party (PP)	4,541	13.73	−28.95	4	−8
Linese Alternative (AL)	1,619	4.90	+0.43	0	±0
Linese People's Union (UdPL)	1,072	3.24	New	0	±0
Andalusian Party (PA)^{1}	1,066	3.22	−7.46	0	−2
United Left/The Greens–Assembly for Andalusia (IULV–CA)	671	2.03	−7.77	0	−2
Blank ballots	269	0.81	−0.10		
Total	33,063			25	±0
Valid votes	33,063	99.20	−0.51		
Invalid votes	268	0.80	+0.51		
Votes cast / turnout	33,331	72.34	+13.64		
Abstentions	12,747	27.66	−13.64		
Registered voters	46,078				
Sources
Footnotes: ^{1} Andalusian Party results are compared to the combined totals of Andalusian Party and Andalusian Progress Party in the 1995 election.

=== Linares ===
Population: 58,410

← Summary of the 13 June 1999 City Council of Linares election results →
Parties and alliances	Popular vote			Seats	
Parties and alliances	Votes	%	±pp	Total	+/−
Spanish Socialist Workers' Party of Andalusia (PSOE–A)	11,776	41.01	+16.09	11	+4
People's Party (PP)	10,211	35.56	+4.10	9	+1
United Left/The Greens–Assembly for Andalusia (IULV–CA)	3,486	12.14	−12.17	3	−3
Andalusian Party (PA)^{1}	2,284	7.95	−9.87	2	−2
The Greens–Andalusian Left (LV–IA)	508	1.77	New	0	±0
Humanist Party (PH)	30	0.10	New	0	±0
Blank ballots	421	1.47	+0.15		
Total	28,716			25	±0
Valid votes	28,716	99.12	−0.32		
Invalid votes	254	0.88	+0.32		
Votes cast / turnout	28,970	63.02	−5.54		
Abstentions	17,001	36.98	+5.54		
Registered voters	45,971				
Sources
Footnotes: ^{1} Andalusian Party results are compared to the combined totals of Andalusian Party and Andalusian Progress Party in the 1995 election.

=== Málaga ===
Population: 528,079

← Summary of the 13 June 1999 City Council of Málaga election results →
Parties and alliances	Popular vote			Seats	
Parties and alliances	Votes	%	±pp	Total	+/−
People's Party (PP)	129,811	55.72	+10.06	19	+4
Spanish Socialist Workers' Party of Andalusia (PSOE–A)	64,165	27.54	+6.54	9	+2
United Left/The Greens–Assembly for Andalusia (IULV–CA)	21,513	9.23	−19.20	3	−6
Andalusian Party (PA)^{1}	8,534	3.66	+0.98	0	±0
The Greens of Andalusia–Greens (LVA–V)	3,611	1.55	New	0	±0
Andalusian Nation (NA)	474	0.20	+0.15	0	±0
Humanist Party (PH)	353	0.15	+0.08	0	±0
The Phalanx (FE)	289	0.12	New	0	±0
National Union (UN)	131	0.06	New	0	±0
Blank ballots	4,086	1.75	+0.88		
Total	232,967			31	±0
Valid votes	232,967	99.48	−0.28		
Invalid votes	1,220	0.52	+0.28		
Votes cast / turnout	234,187	52.42	−12.36		
Abstentions	212,575	47.58	+12.36		
Registered voters	446,762				
Sources
Footnotes: ^{1} Andalusian Party results are compared to the combined totals of Andalusian Party and Andalusian Progress Party in the 1995 election.

=== Marbella ===
Population: 98,377

← Summary of the 13 June 1999 City Council of Marbella election results →
Parties and alliances	Popular vote			Seats	
Parties and alliances	Votes	%	±pp	Total	+/−
Liberal Independent Group (GIL)	21,971	52.30	−13.28	15	−4
Spanish Socialist Workers' Party of Andalusia (PSOE–A)	8,519	20.28	+6.60	5	+2
People's Party (PP)	5,230	12.45	+5.32	3	+1
Andalusian Party (PA)	2,898	6.90	+6.15	2	+2
United Left/The Greens–Assembly for Andalusia (IULV–CA)	1,591	3.79	−3.00	0	−1
The Greens of Marbella and San Pedro de Alcántara (LV)	1,113	2.65	New	0	±0
Andalusian Nation (NA)	126	0.30	+0.12	0	±0
Humanist Party (PH)	48	0.11	New	0	±0
Blank ballots	516	1.23	+0.14		
Total	42,012			25	±0
Valid votes	42,012	99.52	±0.00		
Invalid votes	203	0.48	±0.00		
Votes cast / turnout	42,215	60.08	−8.44		
Abstentions	28,047	39.92	+8.44		
Registered voters	70,262				

=== Morón de la Frontera ===
Population: 28,232

← Summary of the 13 June 1999 City Council of Morón de la Frontera election results →
Parties and alliances	Popular vote			Seats	
Parties and alliances	Votes	%	±pp	Total	+/−
Spanish Socialist Workers' Party of Andalusia (PSOE–A)	4,864	38.42	+0.14	9	±0
People's Party (PP)	2,944	23.25	+5.67	5	+1
United Left/The Greens–Assembly for Andalusia (IULV–CA)	1,967	15.54	−22.09	3	−5
Democratic Party of the New Left–Andalusia (PDNI–A)	1,564	12.35	New	3	+3
Andalusian Party (PA)	944	7.46	+2.56	1	+1
Blank ballots	378	2.99	+1.39		
Total	12,661			21	±0
Valid votes	12,661	99.05	−0.55		
Invalid votes	121	0.95	+0.55		
Votes cast / turnout	12,782	55.82	−3.51		
Abstentions	10,116	44.18	+3.51		
Registered voters	22,898				

=== Motril ===
Population: 50,025

← Summary of the 13 June 1999 City Council of Motril election results →
Parties and alliances	Popular vote			Seats	
Parties and alliances	Votes	%	±pp	Total	+/−
Spanish Socialist Workers' Party of Andalusia (PSOE–A)	8,975	39.55	+3.80	11	+3
People's Party (PP)	6,704	29.54	+1.42	8	+2
United Left/The Greens–Assembly for Andalusia (IULV–CA)	1,830	8.06	−9.53	2	−2
Andalusian Party (PA)	1,788	7.88	+4.02	2	+2
Independent Motrilenian Democratic Group (ADMI)	1,742	7.68	−6.09	2	−1
Independent Group for the Municipal Autonomy of Torrenueva (GRITO)	922	4.06	New	0	±0
Democratic Party of the New Left–Andalusia (PDNI–A)	404	1.78	New	0	±0
Blank ballots	330	1.45	+0.54		
Total	22,695			25	+4
Valid votes	22,695	99.01	−0.34		
Invalid votes	226	0.99	+0.34		
Votes cast / turnout	22,921	58.40	−7.11		
Abstentions	16,324	41.60	+7.11		
Registered voters	39,245				

=== Ronda ===
Population: 33,806

← Summary of the 13 June 1999 City Council of Ronda election results →
Parties and alliances	Popular vote			Seats	
Parties and alliances	Votes	%	±pp	Total	+/−
Liberal Independent Group (GIL)	6,614	35.40	New	8	+8
Spanish Socialist Workers' Party of Andalusia (PSOE–A)	6,093	32.61	−17.14	7	−4
People's Party (PP)	2,471	13.22	−14.95	3	−3
Andalusian Party (PA)	1,971	10.55	+0.60	2	±0
United Left/The Greens–Assembly for Andalusia (IULV–CA)	1,350	7.23	−3.04	1	−1
Blank ballots	186	1.00	+0.03		
Total	18,685			21	±0
Valid votes	18,685	99.57	−0.01		
Invalid votes	80	0.43	+0.01		
Votes cast / turnout	18,765	68.98	+0.62		
Abstentions	8,437	31.02	−0.62		
Registered voters	27,202				

=== San Fernando ===
Population: 84,014

← Summary of the 13 June 1999 City Council of San Fernando election results →
Parties and alliances	Popular vote			Seats	
Parties and alliances	Votes	%	±pp	Total	+/−
Andalusian Party (PA)^{1}	18,741	55.36	+16.22	15	+4
People's Party (PP)	7,518	22.21	−8.18	6	−2
Spanish Socialist Workers' Party of Andalusia (PSOE–A)	5,393	15.93	−0.49	4	±0
United Left/The Greens–Assembly for Andalusia (IULV–CA)	1,638	4.84	−5.17	0	−2
Blank ballots	560	1.65	+0.53		
Total	33,850			25	±0
Valid votes	33,850	99.13	−0.55		
Invalid votes	298	0.87	+0.55		
Votes cast / turnout	34,148	56.47	+2.49		
Abstentions	26,325	43.53	−2.49		
Registered voters	60,473				
Sources
Footnotes: ^{1} Andalusian Party results are compared to the combined totals of Andalusian Party and Andalusian Progress Party in the 1995 election.

=== Sanlúcar de Barrameda ===
Population: 61,382

← Summary of the 13 June 1999 City Council of Sanlúcar de Barrameda election results →
Parties and alliances	Popular vote			Seats	
Parties and alliances	Votes	%	±pp	Total	+/−
Spanish Socialist Workers' Party of Andalusia (PSOE–A)	6,829	26.86	−9.02	7	−2
People's Party (PP)	6,506	25.59	+3.66	7	+1
Andalusian Party (PA)^{1}	5,789	22.77	+5.55	6	+2
United Left/The Greens–Assembly for Andalusia (IULV–CA)	2,631	10.35	−13.57	3	−3
Independent Sanluquenians (SI)	1,863	7.33	New	2	+2
The Greens–Andalusian Left (LV–IA)	1,065	4.19	New	0	±0
United Citizens for Sanlúcar (CUS)	366	1.44	New	0	±0
Blank ballots	374	1.47	+0.41		
Total	25,423			25	±0
Valid votes	25,423	99.19	−0.53		
Invalid votes	208	0.81	+0.53		
Votes cast / turnout	25,631	55.35	+0.64		
Abstentions	20,676	44.65	−0.64		
Registered voters	46,307				
Sources
Footnotes: ^{1} Andalusian Party results are compared to the combined totals of Andalusian Progress Party and Andalusian Party in the 1995 election.

=== Seville ===
Population: 701,927

=== Utrera ===
Population: 45,947

← Summary of the 13 June 1999 City Council of Utrera election results →
Parties and alliances	Popular vote			Seats	
Parties and alliances	Votes	%	±pp	Total	+/−
Spanish Socialist Workers' Party of Andalusia (PSOE–A)	9,547	43.75	−3.92	10	−1
Andalusian Party (PA)^{1}	4,514	20.69	+10.30	4	+2
People's Party (PP)	3,928	18.00	−3.88	4	−1
United Left/The Greens–Assembly for Andalusia (IULV–CA)	2,090	9.58	−5.17	2	−1
Independent Group Pro-City Council of El Palmar de Troya (GI–PPT)	1,164	5.33	New	1	+1
The Greens–Andalusian Left (LV–IA)	279	1.28	New	0	±0
Blank ballots	298	1.37	−0.11		
Total	21,820			21	±0
Valid votes	21,820	99.37	−0.34		
Invalid votes	138	0.63	+0.34		
Votes cast / turnout	21,958	61.57	−3.73		
Abstentions	13,708	38.43	+3.73		
Registered voters	35,666				
Sources
Footnotes: ^{1} Andalusian Party results are compared to the combined totals of Andalusian Party and Andalusian Progress Party in the 1995 election.

=== Vélez-Málaga ===
Population: 53,816

← Summary of the 13 June 1999 City Council of Vélez-Málaga election results →
Parties and alliances	Popular vote			Seats	
Parties and alliances	Votes	%	±pp	Total	+/−
Spanish Socialist Workers' Party of Andalusia (PSOE–A)	9,977	36.29	+15.91	10	+4
People's Party (PP)	5,023	18.27	−2.56	5	−1
Pro-Torre del Mar Municipality Independent Group (GIPMTM)	4,535	16.49	−2.53	5	±0
Andalusian Party (PA)^{1}	3,443	12.52	+0.17	3	+1
United Left/The Greens–Assembly for Andalusia (IULV–CA)	2,146	7.80	−6.75	2	−2
Democratic Party of the New Left–Andalusia (PDNI–A)	733	2.67	New	0	±0
La Axarquía Progress (PAX)	430	1.56	−3.78	0	−1
The Greens of Andalusia (LVA)	378	1.37	New	0	±0
Humanist Party (PH)	32	0.12	New	0	±0
Independent Solution (SI)	n/a	n/a	−5.88	0	−1
Blank ballots	799	2.91	+2.14		
Total	27,496			25	±0
Valid votes	27,496	98.96	−0.70		
Invalid votes	289	1.04	+0.70		
Votes cast / turnout	27,785	62.78	−7.03		
Abstentions	16,473	37.22	+7.03		
Registered voters	44,258				
Sources
Footnotes: ^{1} Andalusian Party results are compared to the combined totals of Andalusian Party and Andalusian Progress Party in the 1995 election.
