= 1995 Spanish local elections in Andalusia =

This article presents the results breakdown of the local elections held in Andalusia on 28 May 1995. The following tables show detailed results in the autonomous community's most populous municipalities, sorted alphabetically.

== City control ==
The following table lists party control in the most populous municipalities, including provincial capitals (highlighted in bold). Gains for a party are highlighted in that party's colour.

Municipality	Population	Previous control	New control
Alcalá de Guadaíra	54,529	Spanish Socialist Workers' Party of Andalusia (PSOE–A)	Spanish Socialist Workers' Party of Andalusia (PSOE–A)
Algeciras	103,787	Spanish Socialist Workers' Party of Andalusia (PSOE–A)	Andalusian Progress Party (PAP) (PA in 1996)
**Almería**	167,361	Spanish Socialist Workers' Party of Andalusia (PSOE–A)	People's Party (PP)
Antequera	39,842	Spanish Socialist Workers' Party of Andalusia (PSOE–A)	Spanish Socialist Workers' Party of Andalusia (PSOE–A)
Benalmádena	24,706	Spanish Socialist Workers' Party of Andalusia (PSOE–A)	Independent Group of Benalmádena (GIB)
**Cádiz**	155,438	Spanish Socialist Workers' Party of Andalusia (PSOE–A)	People's Party (PP)
Chiclana de la Frontera	50,697	Spanish Socialist Workers' Party of Andalusia (PSOE–A)	Spanish Socialist Workers' Party of Andalusia (PSOE–A)
**Córdoba**	315,948	United Left/The Greens–Assembly for Andalusia (IULV–CA)	People's Party (PP)
Dos Hermanas	82,814	Spanish Socialist Workers' Party of Andalusia (PSOE–A)	Spanish Socialist Workers' Party of Andalusia (PSOE–A)
Écija	37,267	Spanish Socialist Workers' Party of Andalusia (PSOE–A)	Andalusian Party (PA)
El Ejido	44,373	People's Party (PP)	People's Party (PP)
El Puerto de Santa María	69,656	Portuese Independents (IP)	Portuese Independents (IP)
Fuengirola	42,605	Spanish Socialist Workers' Party of Andalusia (PSOE–A)	People's Party (PP)
**Granada**	271,180	Spanish Socialist Workers' Party of Andalusia (PSOE–A)	People's Party (PP)
**Huelva**	145,049	Spanish Socialist Workers' Party of Andalusia (PSOE–A)	People's Party (PP)
**Jaén**	112,772	Spanish Socialist Workers' Party of Andalusia (PSOE–A)	People's Party (PP)
Jerez de la Frontera	186,273	Andalusian Progress Party (PAP)	Andalusian Progress Party (PAP) (PA in 1996)
La Línea de la Concepción	61,280	Spanish Socialist Workers' Party of Andalusia (PSOE–A)	People's Party (PP)
Linares	61,642	Spanish Socialist Workers' Party of Andalusia (PSOE–A)	People's Party (PP)
**Málaga**	531,443	Spanish Socialist Workers' Party of Andalusia (PSOE–A)	People's Party (PP)
Marbella	86,013	Liberal Independent Group (GIL)	Liberal Independent Group (GIL)
Morón de la Frontera	29,408	Spanish Socialist Workers' Party of Andalusia (PSOE–A)	Spanish Socialist Workers' Party of Andalusia (PSOE–A)
Motril	48,984	Spanish Socialist Workers' Party of Andalusia (PSOE–A)	Spanish Socialist Workers' Party of Andalusia (PSOE–A)
Ronda	34,575	Spanish Socialist Workers' Party of Andalusia (PSOE–A)	Spanish Socialist Workers' Party of Andalusia (PSOE–A)
San Fernando	87,588	Andalusian Party (PA)	Andalusian Party (PA)
Sanlúcar de Barrameda	59,780	Spanish Socialist Workers' Party of Andalusia (PSOE–A)	Spanish Socialist Workers' Party of Andalusia (PSOE–A)
**Seville**	714,148	Andalusian Party (PA)	People's Party (PP)
Utrera	45,008	Spanish Socialist Workers' Party of Andalusia (PSOE–A)	Spanish Socialist Workers' Party of Andalusia (PSOE–A)
Vélez-Málaga	54,327	Spanish Socialist Workers' Party of Andalusia (PSOE–A)	People's Party (PP) (PSOE–A in 1996)

== Municipalities ==
=== Alcalá de Guadaíra ===
Population: 54,529

← Summary of the 28 May 1995 City Council of Alcalá de Guadaíra election results →
Parties and alliances	Popular vote			Seats	
Parties and alliances	Votes	%	±pp	Total	+/−
Spanish Socialist Workers' Party of Andalusia (PSOE–A)	10,212	39.88	−18.27	11	−4
People's Party (PP)	5,653	22.08	+13.76	6	+4
United Left/The Greens–Assembly for Andalusia (IULV–CA)	5,493	21.45	+8.78	5	+2
Andalusian Party (PA)	3,405	13.30	−6.55	3	−2
Andalusian Progress Party (PAP)	302	1.18	New	0	±0
Andalusian Nation (NA)	170	0.66	New	0	±0
Blank ballots	369	1.44	+0.43		
Total	25,604			25	±0
Valid votes	25,604	99.68	+0.24		
Invalid votes	82	0.32	−0.24		
Votes cast / turnout	25,686	62.73	+10.85		
Abstentions	15,258	37.27	−10.85		
Registered voters	40,944				

=== Algeciras ===
Population: 103,787

← Summary of the 28 May 1995 City Council of Algeciras election results →
Parties and alliances	Popular vote			Seats	
Parties and alliances	Votes	%	±pp	Total	+/−
Andalusian Progress Party (PAP)	18,291	41.26	New	12	+12
People's Party (PP)	11,741	26.48	+5.46	8	+2
Spanish Socialist Workers' Party of Andalusia (PSOE–A)	7,898	17.82	−17.54	5	−6
United Left/The Greens–Assembly for Andalusia (IULV–CA)	3,187	7.19	−1.22	2	±0
Andalusian Party (PA)	1,882	4.25	−24.47	0	−8
Andalusian Nation (NA)	1,014	2.29	New	0	±0
Blank ballots	318	0.72	+0.34		
Total	44,331			27	±0
Valid votes	44,331	99.63	+0.34		
Invalid votes	163	0.37	−0.34		
Votes cast / turnout	44,494	58.29	+12.07		
Abstentions	31,838	41.71	−12.07		
Registered voters	76,332				

=== Almería ===
Population: 167,361

← Summary of the 28 May 1995 City Council of Almería election results →
Parties and alliances	Popular vote			Seats	
Parties and alliances	Votes	%	±pp	Total	+/−
People's Party (PP)	40,530	48.81	+14.63	14	+4
Spanish Socialist Workers' Party of Andalusia (PSOE–A)	25,725	30.98	−9.45	9	−3
United Left/The Greens–Assembly for Andalusia (IULV–CA)	12,945	15.59	+6.14	4	+1
Andalusian Party (PA)	1,161	1.40	−4.99	0	−2
Andalusian Nation (NA)	796	0.96	New	0	±0
Platform of Independents of Spain (PIE)	616	0.74	New	0	±0
Andalusian Progress Party (PAP)	466	0.56	New	0	±0
Blank ballots	792	0.95	+0.26		
Total	83,031			27	±0
Valid votes	83,031	99.72	−0.01		
Invalid votes	231	0.28	+0.01		
Votes cast / turnout	83,262	66.20	+13.53		
Abstentions	42,502	33.80	−13.53		
Registered voters	125,764				

=== Antequera ===
Population: 39,842

← Summary of the 28 May 1995 City Council of Antequera election results →
Parties and alliances	Popular vote			Seats	
Parties and alliances	Votes	%	±pp	Total	+/−
Spanish Socialist Workers' Party of Andalusia (PSOE–A)	9,592	43.99	−6.21	10	−2
People's Party (PP)	7,185	32.95	+15.43	8	+4
United Left/The Greens–Assembly for Andalusia (IULV–CA)	3,543	16.25	+9.26	3	+2
Andalusian Workers' Group (ATA)	1,034	4.74	−3.44	0	−2
Andalusian Party (PA)	237	1.09	−1.94	0	±0
Electors' Independent Democratic Group (ADIE)	29	0.13	New	0	±0
Independent Solution (SI)	n/a	n/a	−9.05	0	−2
Blank ballots	183	0.84	+0.36		
Total	21,803			21	±0
Valid votes	21,803	99.57	−0.03		
Invalid votes	95	0.43	+0.03		
Votes cast / turnout	21,898	71.55	+10.12		
Abstentions	8,709	28.45	−10.12		
Registered voters	30,607				

=== Benalmádena ===
Population: 24,706

← Summary of the 28 May 1995 City Council of Benalmádena election results →
Parties and alliances	Popular vote			Seats	
Parties and alliances	Votes	%	±pp	Total	+/−
Independent Group of Benalmádena (GIB)	3,873	33.79	+29.78	8	+8
People's Party (PP)	3,108	27.12	+15.42	6	+3
Spanish Socialist Workers' Party of Andalusia (PSOE–A)	2,018	17.61	−21.88	4	−7
United Left/The Greens–Assembly for Andalusia (IULV–CA)	1,756	15.32	+5.37	3	+1
Andalusian Party (PA)	332	2.90	−2.43	0	−1
Benalmádena Independent Municipal Unity (UMIB)	127	1.11	−4.58	0	−1
Independent Solution (SI)	76	0.66	−0.44	0	±0
Andalusian Progress Party (PAP)	48	0.42	New	0	±0
Democratic and Social Centre (CDS)	n/a	n/a	−10.87	0	−3
Blank ballots	123	1.07	+0.28		
Total	11,461			21	±0
Valid votes	11,461	99.70	+0.19		
Invalid votes	34	0.30	−0.19		
Votes cast / turnout	11,495	69.21	+12.73		
Abstentions	5,115	30.79	−12.73		
Registered voters	16,610				

=== Cádiz ===
Population: 155,438

← Summary of the 28 May 1995 City Council of Cádiz election results →
Parties and alliances	Popular vote			Seats	
Parties and alliances	Votes	%	±pp	Total	+/−
People's Party (PP)	36,640	49.05	+23.72	15	+8
Spanish Socialist Workers' Party of Andalusia (PSOE–A)	17,201	23.03	−23.46	7	−7
United Left/The Greens–Assembly for Andalusia (IULV–CA)	13,844	18.53	+6.26	5	+2
Andalusian Party (PA)	2,589	3.47	−7.37	0	−3
Cádiz Independent Democratic Group (CADI)	1,848	2.47	New	0	±0
Andalusian Progress Party (PAP)	883	1.18	New	0	±0
Platform of Independents of Spain (PIE)	737	0.99	New	0	±0
Spanish Phalanx of the CNSO (FE–JONS)	113	0.15	−0.28	0	±0
Blank ballots	840	1.12	−0.37		
Total	74,695			27	±0
Valid votes	74,695	99.63	+0.40		
Invalid votes	274	0.37	−0.40		
Votes cast / turnout	74,969	63.94	+18.58		
Abstentions	42,284	36.06	−18.58		
Registered voters	117,253				

=== Chiclana de la Frontera ===
Population: 50,697

← Summary of the 28 May 1995 City Council of Chiclana de la Frontera election results →
Parties and alliances	Popular vote			Seats	
Parties and alliances	Votes	%	±pp	Total	+/−
Spanish Socialist Workers' Party of Andalusia (PSOE–A)	7,137	35.64	−26.45	10	−4
People's Party (PP)	6,526	32.59	+22.23	10	+8
United Left/The Greens–Assembly for Andalusia (IULV–CA)	2,573	12.85	+4.31	3	+1
Platform of Independents of Spain (PIE)	1,085	5.42	New	1	+1
Andalusian Party (PA)	1,076	5.37	−6.61	1	−1
Citizen Collective (CLC)	960	4.79	New	0	±0
Andalusian Progress Party (PAP)	467	2.33	New	0	±0
Democratic and Social Centre (CDS)	n/a	n/a	−6.40	0	−1
Blank ballots	202	1.01	+0.39		
Total	20,026			25	+4
Valid votes	20,026	99.76	+0.25		
Invalid votes	48	0.24	−0.25		
Votes cast / turnout	20,074	54.53	+9.17		
Abstentions	16,739	45.47	−9.17		
Registered voters	36,813				

=== Córdoba ===
Population: 315,948

← Summary of the 28 May 1995 City Council of Córdoba election results →
Parties and alliances	Popular vote			Seats	
Parties and alliances	Votes	%	±pp	Total	+/−
People's Party (PP)	61,619	40.88	+17.55	13	+6
United Left/The Greens–Assembly for Andalusia (IULV–CA)	55,948	37.12	−2.76	11	−2
Spanish Socialist Workers' Party of Andalusia (PSOE–A)	26,173	17.37	−12.27	5	−4
Andalusian Party (PA)	2,401	1.59	−3.36	0	±0
Andalusian Progress Party (PAP)	1,815	1.20	New	0	±0
Andalusian Nation (NA)	249	0.17	New	0	±0
Spanish Phalanx of the CNSO (FE–JONS)	206	0.14	New	0	±0
Blank ballots	2,302	1.53	+0.69		
Total	150,713			29	±0
Valid votes	150,713	99.66	+0.09		
Invalid votes	508	0.34	−0.09		
Votes cast / turnout	151,221	62.91	+9.44		
Abstentions	89,141	37.09	−9.44		
Registered voters	240,362				

=== Dos Hermanas ===
Population: 82,814

← Summary of the 28 May 1995 City Council of Dos Hermanas election results →
Parties and alliances	Popular vote			Seats	
Parties and alliances	Votes	%	±pp	Total	+/−
Spanish Socialist Workers' Party of Andalusia (PSOE–A)	17,706	49.54	−11.11	13	−3
People's Party (PP)	8,091	22.64	+11.61	6	+3
United Left/The Greens–Assembly for Andalusia (IULV–CA)	8,090	22.63	+4.88	6	+2
Andalusian Party (PA)	1,105	3.09	−5.92	0	−2
Andalusian Progress Party (PAP)	257	0.72	New	0	±0
Blank ballots	493	1.38	+0.49		
Total	35,742			25	±0
Valid votes	35,742	99.78	+0.10		
Invalid votes	80	0.22	−0.10		
Votes cast / turnout	35,822	60.50	+9.56		
Abstentions	23,385	39.50	−9.56		
Registered voters	59,207				

=== Écija ===
Population: 37,267

← Summary of the 28 May 1995 City Council of Écija election results →
Parties and alliances	Popular vote			Seats	
Parties and alliances	Votes	%	±pp	Total	+/−
Andalusian Party (PA)	8,536	43.23	+12.60	10	+3
Spanish Socialist Workers' Party of Andalusia (PSOE–A)	5,717	28.96	−20.78	6	−5
People's Party (PP)	3,772	19.10	+7.03	4	+2
United Left/The Greens–Assembly for Andalusia (IULV–CA)	1,515	7.67	+0.70	1	±0
Blank ballots	204	1.03	+0.44		
Total	19,744			21	±0
Valid votes	19,744	99.52	−0.13		
Invalid votes	96	0.48	+0.13		
Votes cast / turnout	19,840	72.00	+6.58		
Abstentions	7,716	28.00	−6.58		
Registered voters	27,556				

=== El Ejido ===
Population: 44,373

← Summary of the 28 May 1995 City Council of El Ejido election results →
Parties and alliances	Popular vote			Seats	
Parties and alliances	Votes	%	±pp	Total	+/−
People's Party (PP)	9,583	51.75	+10.76	12	+2
Spanish Socialist Workers' Party of Andalusia (PSOE–A)	5,841	31.54	−9.10	7	−2
United Left/The Greens–Assembly for Andalusia (IULV–CA)	1,682	9.08	+2.85	2	+1
Independent Democratic Party of the West (PDIP)	668	3.61	New	0	±0
Andalusian Party (PA)	383	2.07	−2.76	0	±0
Integration Party for Almeria and its Peoples (PIAP)	90	0.49	New	0	±0
Andalusian Progress Party (PAP)	71	0.38	New	0	±0
Democratic and Social Centre (CDS)	n/a	n/a	−6.60	0	−1
Blank ballots	200	1.08	+0.37		
Total	18,518			21	±0
Valid votes	18,518	99.63	+0.10		
Invalid votes	68	0.37	−0.10		
Votes cast / turnout	18,586	58.76	+5.96		
Abstentions	13,042	41.24	−5.96		
Registered voters	31,628				

=== El Puerto de Santa María ===
Population: 69,656

← Summary of the 28 May 1995 City Council of El Puerto de Santa María election results →
Parties and alliances	Popular vote			Seats	
Parties and alliances	Votes	%	±pp	Total	+/−
Portuese Independents (IP)	16,522	57.87	+27.61	16	+8
People's Party (PP)	4,814	16.86	+2.56	4	±0
United Left/The Greens–Assembly for Andalusia (IULV–CA)	3,047	10.67	−5.90	3	−1
Spanish Socialist Workers' Party of Andalusia (PSOE–A)	2,952	10.34	−15.18	2	−5
Andalusian Progress Party (PAP)	449	1.57	New	0	±0
Andalusian Party (PA)	207	0.73	−7.15	0	−2
Portuese Citizen Union (UCP)	167	0.58	New	0	±0
Andalusian Nation (NA)	113	0.40	New	0	±0
Blank ballots	278	0.97	−0.12		
Total	28,549			25	±0
Valid votes	28,549	99.43	−0.05		
Invalid votes	163	0.57	+0.05		
Votes cast / turnout	28,712	56.85	+11.57		
Abstentions	21,791	43.15	−11.57		
Registered voters	50,503				

=== Fuengirola ===
Population: 42,605

← Summary of the 28 May 1995 City Council of Fuengirola election results →
Parties and alliances	Popular vote			Seats	
Parties and alliances	Votes	%	±pp	Total	+/−
People's Party (PP)	11,642	55.09	+28.28	14	+7
Spanish Socialist Workers' Party of Andalusia (PSOE–A)	4,117	19.48	−15.79	4	−5
United Left/The Greens–Assembly for Andalusia (IULV–CA)	1,918	9.08	+4.18	2	+2
Platform of Independents of Spain (PIE)	1,382	6.54	New	1	+1
Local Group for Fuengirola (ALpF)	1,032	4.88	New	0	±0
Andalusian Party (PA)	524	2.48	−1.81	0	±0
Andalusian Progress Party (PAP)	188	0.89	New	0	±0
Spanish Phalanx of the CNSO (FE–JONS)	55	0.26	New	0	±0
Independent Solution (SI)	n/a	n/a	−22.74	0	−5
Blank ballots	276	1.31	+0.84		
Total	21,134			21	±0
Valid votes	21,134	99.47	−0.11		
Invalid votes	112	0.53	+0.11		
Votes cast / turnout	21,246	70.39	+11.11		
Abstentions	8,937	29.61	−11.11		
Registered voters	30,183				

=== Granada ===
Population: 271,180

← Summary of the 28 May 1995 City Council of Granada election results →
Parties and alliances	Popular vote			Seats	
Parties and alliances	Votes	%	±pp	Total	+/−
People's Party (PP)	73,936	51.68	+10.58	15	+2
Spanish Socialist Workers' Party of Andalusia (PSOE–A)	40,483	28.30	−10.20	8	−4
United Left/The Greens–Assembly for Andalusia (IULV–CA)	22,492	15.72	+6.81	4	+2
Andalusian Party (PA)	1,685	1.18	−3.08	0	±0
Andalusian Progress Party (PAP)	1,581	1.11	New	0	±0
Andalusian Federation of Independents (FADI)	235	0.16	New	0	±0
Platform of Independents of Spain (PIE)	143	0.10	New	0	±0
Andalusian Nation (NA)	141	0.10	New	0	±0
Spanish Phalanx of the CNSO (FE–JONS)	122	0.09	−0.04	0	±0
Andalusian Popular Unity (UPAN)	119	0.08	−0.03	0	±0
Blank ballots	2,129	1.49	+0.69		
Total	143,066			27	±0
Valid votes	143,066	99.63	+0.02		
Invalid votes	526	0.37	−0.02		
Votes cast / turnout	143,592	66.63	+11.83		
Abstentions	71,901	33.37	−11.83		
Registered voters	215,493				

=== Huelva ===
Population: 145,049

← Summary of the 28 May 1995 City Council of Huelva election results →
Parties and alliances	Popular vote			Seats	
Parties and alliances	Votes	%	±pp	Total	+/−
People's Party (PP)	27,903	42.36	+17.62	12	+5
Spanish Socialist Workers' Party of Andalusia (PSOE–A)	24,697	37.49	−14.03	11	−5
United Left/The Greens–Assembly for Andalusia (IULV–CA)	9,762	14.82	+5.19	4	+2
Andalusian Party (PA)	2,531	3.84	−3.27	0	−2
Andalusian Nation (NA)	238	0.36	−0.72	0	±0
Blank ballots	739	1.12	+0.44		
Total	65,870			27	±0
Valid votes	65,870	99.74	+0.11		
Invalid votes	173	0.26	−0.11		
Votes cast / turnout	66,043	58.66	+14.02		
Abstentions	46,540	41.34	−14.02		
Registered voters	112,583				

=== Jaén ===
Population: 112,772

← Summary of the 28 May 1995 City Council of Jaén election results →
Parties and alliances	Popular vote			Seats	
Parties and alliances	Votes	%	±pp	Total	+/−
People's Party (PP)	30,938	52.66	+11.67	15	+3
Spanish Socialist Workers' Party of Andalusia (PSOE–A)	16,187	27.55	−12.46	8	−4
United Left/The Greens–Assembly for Andalusia (IULV–CA)	8,143	13.86	+6.84	4	+2
Andalusian Party (PA)	2,330	3.97	−1.81	0	−1
Andalusian Progress Party (PAP)	224	0.38	New	0	±0
Socialist October (OS)	216	0.37	New	0	±0
Blank ballots	712	1.21	+0.64		
Total	58,750			27	±0
Valid votes	58,750	99.63	+0.02		
Invalid votes	219	0.37	−0.02		
Votes cast / turnout	58,969	71.63	+10.95		
Abstentions	23,354	28.37	−10.95		
Registered voters	82,323				

=== Jerez de la Frontera ===
Population: 186,273

← Summary of the 28 May 1995 City Council of Jerez de la Frontera election results →
Parties and alliances	Popular vote			Seats	
Parties and alliances	Votes	%	±pp	Total	+/−
Andalusian Progress Party (PAP)	31,928	40.74	New	12	+12
People's Party (PP)	19,734	25.18	+15.14	7	+5
Spanish Socialist Workers' Party of Andalusia (PSOE–A)	15,508	19.79	−6.79	5	−2
United Left/The Greens–Assembly for Andalusia (IULV–CA)	8,621	11.00	+3.99	3	+1
Andalusian Party (PA)	1,265	1.61	−52.17	0	−16
Independent Rural Initiative (IRI)	582	0.74	New	0	±0
Blank ballots	729	0.93	+0.24		
Total	78,367			27	±0
Valid votes	78,367	99.64	−0.07		
Invalid votes	283	0.36	+0.07		
Votes cast / turnout	78,650	55.98	+5.58		
Abstentions	61,851	44.02	−5.58		
Registered voters	140,501				

=== La Línea de la Concepción ===
Population: 61,280

← Summary of the 28 May 1995 City Council of La Línea de la Concepción election results →
Parties and alliances	Popular vote			Seats	
Parties and alliances	Votes	%	±pp	Total	+/−
People's Party (PP)	11,831	42.68	+20.49	12	+6
Spanish Socialist Workers' Party of Andalusia (PSOE–A)	8,373	30.20	−13.34	9	−2
United Left/The Greens–Assembly for Andalusia (IULV–CA)	2,717	9.80	+1.94	2	±0
Andalusian Party (PA)	1,909	6.89	−17.16	2	−4
Linese Alternative (AL)	1,240	4.47	New	0	±0
Andalusian Progress Party (PAP)	1,051	3.79	New	0	±0
Independent Linese Union (ULI)	348	1.26	New	0	±0
Blank ballots	252	0.91	+0.22		
Total	27,721			25	±0
Valid votes	27,721	99.71	+0.54		
Invalid votes	80	0.29	−0.54		
Votes cast / turnout	27,801	58.70	+9.82		
Abstentions	19,560	41.30	−9.82		
Registered voters	47,361				

=== Linares ===
Population: 61,642

← Summary of the 28 May 1995 City Council of Linares election results →
Parties and alliances	Popular vote			Seats	
Parties and alliances	Votes	%	±pp	Total	+/−
People's Party (PP)	9,836	31.46	+17.13	8	+5
Spanish Socialist Workers' Party of Andalusia (PSOE–A)	7,790	24.92	−8.42	7	−2
United Left/The Greens–Assembly for Andalusia (IULV–CA)	7,600	24.31	+1.94	6	±0
Andalusian Party (PA)	5,260	16.82	−9.61	4	−3
Andalusian Progress Party (PAP)	313	1.00	New	0	±0
Spanish Phalanx of the CNSO (FE–JONS)	53	0.17	New	0	±0
Blank ballots	413	1.32	+0.64		
Total	31,265			25	±0
Valid votes	31,265	99.44	+0.23		
Invalid votes	177	0.56	−0.23		
Votes cast / turnout	31,442	68.56	+9.47		
Abstentions	14,419	31.44	−9.47		
Registered voters	45,861				

=== Málaga ===
Population: 531,443

← Summary of the 28 May 1995 City Council of Málaga election results →
Parties and alliances	Popular vote			Seats	
Parties and alliances	Votes	%	±pp	Total	+/−
People's Party (PP)	122,975	45.66	+19.70	15	+7
United Left/The Greens–Assembly for Andalusia (IULV–CA)	76,580	28.43	+15.71	9	+5
Spanish Socialist Workers' Party of Andalusia (PSOE–A)	56,554	21.00	−28.40	7	−10
Andalusian Party (PA)	5,719	2.12	−3.93	0	−2
Malagenean Progress Party (PMP)	1,802	0.67	New	0	±0
Andalusian Progress Party (PAP)	1,505	0.56	New	0	±0
Platform of Independents of Spain (PIE)	507	0.19	New	0	±0
Liberal Democratic Union (UDL)	426	0.16	New	0	±0
Andalusian Popular Unity (UPAN)	239	0.09	−0.21	0	±0
Democratic Andalusian Unity (UAD)	208	0.08	New	0	±0
Humanist Platform (PH)	191	0.07	New	0	±0
Spanish Phalanx of the CNSO (FE–JONS)	148	0.05	New	0	±0
Andalusian Nation (NA)	128	0.05	−0.07	0	±0
Blank ballots	2,344	0.87	+0.05		
Total	269,326			31	±0
Valid votes	269,326	99.76	+0.18		
Invalid votes	660	0.24	−0.18		
Votes cast / turnout	269,986	64.78	+17.16		
Abstentions	146,794	35.22	−17.16		
Registered voters	416,780				

=== Marbella ===
Population: 86,013

← Summary of the 28 May 1995 City Council of Marbella election results →
Parties and alliances	Popular vote			Seats	
Parties and alliances	Votes	%	±pp	Total	+/−
Liberal Independent Group (GIL)	24,718	65.58	−0.10	19	±0
Spanish Socialist Workers' Party of Andalusia (PSOE–A)	5,155	13.68	−0.61	3	−1
People's Party (PP)	2,689	7.13	+3.74	2	+2
United Left/The Greens–Assembly for Andalusia (IULV–CA)	2,558	6.79	+2.80	1	+1
San Pedro de Alcántara Pro-Independence Association (ISP)	1,811	4.80	−2.71	0	−2
Andalusian Party (PA)	283	0.75	−0.70	0	±0
Andalusian Nation (NA)	68	0.18	−0.30	0	±0
Blank ballots	409	1.09	+0.33		
Total	37,691			25	±0
Valid votes	37,691	99.52	+1.31		
Invalid votes	181	0.48	−1.31		
Votes cast / turnout	37,872	68.52	+3.88		
Abstentions	17,403	31.48	−3.88		
Registered voters	55,275				

=== Morón de la Frontera ===
Population: 29,408

← Summary of the 28 May 1995 City Council of Morón de la Frontera election results →
Parties and alliances	Popular vote			Seats	
Parties and alliances	Votes	%	±pp	Total	+/−
Spanish Socialist Workers' Party of Andalusia (PSOE–A)	5,029	38.28	−1.08	9	±0
United Left/The Greens–Assembly for Andalusia (IULV–CA)	4,944	37.63	+4.39	8	+1
People's Party (PP)	2,310	17.58	−5.55	4	−1
Andalusian Party (PA)	644	4.90	+1.24	0	±0
Blank ballots	210	1.60	+0.98		
Total	13,137			21	±0
Valid votes	13,137	99.60	−0.19		
Invalid votes	53	0.40	+0.19		
Votes cast / turnout	13,190	59.33	+3.17		
Abstentions	9,041	40.67	−3.17		
Registered voters	22,231				

=== Motril ===
Population: 48,984

← Summary of the 28 May 1995 City Council of Motril election results →
Parties and alliances	Popular vote			Seats	
Parties and alliances	Votes	%	±pp	Total	+/−
Spanish Socialist Workers' Party of Andalusia (PSOE–A)	8,371	35.75	−14.85	8	−4
People's Party (PP)	6,586	28.12	+2.05	6	±0
United Left/The Greens–Assembly for Andalusia (IULV–CA)	4,120	17.59	+6.77	4	+2
Independent Motrilenian Democratic Group (ADMI)	3,225	13.77	New	3	+3
Andalusian Party (PA)	903	3.86	−3.96	0	−1
Blank ballots	212	0.91	+0.22		
Total	23,417			21	±0
Valid votes	23,417	99.35	−0.12		
Invalid votes	153	0.65	+0.12		
Votes cast / turnout	23,570	65.51	+9.83		
Abstentions	12,409	34.49	−9.83		
Registered voters	35,979				

=== Ronda ===
Population: 34,575

← Summary of the 28 May 1995 City Council of Ronda election results →
Parties and alliances	Popular vote			Seats	
Parties and alliances	Votes	%	±pp	Total	+/−
Spanish Socialist Workers' Party of Andalusia (PSOE–A)	8,809	49.75	+0.41	11	±0
People's Party (PP)	4,987	28.17	+13.87	6	+3
United Left/The Greens–Assembly for Andalusia (IULV–CA)	1,819	10.27	+2.12	2	+1
Andalusian Party (PA)	1,761	9.95	−7.29	2	−2
Platform of Independents of Spain (PIE)	159	0.90	New	0	±0
Rondenians for Ronda (RPR)	n/a	n/a	−10.29	0	−2
Blank ballots	171	0.97	+0.28		
Total	17,706			21	±0
Valid votes	17,706	99.58	±0.00		
Invalid votes	74	0.42	±0.00		
Votes cast / turnout	17,780	68.36	+13.36		
Abstentions	8,231	31.64	−13.36		
Registered voters	26,011				

=== San Fernando ===
Population: 87,588

← Summary of the 28 May 1995 City Council of San Fernando election results →
Parties and alliances	Popular vote			Seats	
Parties and alliances	Votes	%	±pp	Total	+/−
Andalusian Party (PA)	12,936	37.60	−18.19	11	−5
People's Party (PP)	10,454	30.39	+19.09	8	+5
Spanish Socialist Workers' Party of Andalusia (PSOE–A)	5,648	16.42	−5.08	4	−2
United Left/The Greens–Assembly for Andalusia (IULV–CA)	3,443	10.01	+5.41	2	+2
Citizen Collective (CLC)	612	1.78	New	0	±0
Andalusian Progress Party (PAP)	529	1.54	New	0	±0
Democratic Andalusian Unity (UAD)	321	0.93	New	0	±0
Andalusian Nation (NA)	75	0.22	New	0	±0
Blank ballots	385	1.12	+0.31		
Total	34,403			25	±0
Valid votes	34,403	99.68	+0.11		
Invalid votes	110	0.32	−0.11		
Votes cast / turnout	34,513	53.98	+7.87		
Abstentions	29,425	46.02	−7.87		
Registered voters	63,938				

=== Sanlúcar de Barrameda ===
Population: 59,780

← Summary of the 28 May 1995 City Council of Sanlúcar de Barrameda election results →
Parties and alliances	Popular vote			Seats	
Parties and alliances	Votes	%	±pp	Total	+/−
Spanish Socialist Workers' Party of Andalusia (PSOE–A)	8,234	35.88	−4.19	9	−2
United Left/The Greens–Assembly for Andalusia (IULV–CA)	5,489	23.92	−11.18	6	−3
People's Party (PP)	5,033	21.93	+11.37	6	+3
Andalusian Progress Party (PAP)	3,600	15.69	New	4	+4
Andalusian Party (PA)	351	1.53	−2.50	0	±0
Andalusian Neighbourhood Independent Group (GIBA)	n/a	n/a	−9.00	0	−2
Blank ballots	243	1.06	+0.51		
Total	22,950			25	±0
Valid votes	22,950	99.72	−0.01		
Invalid votes	65	0.28	+0.01		
Votes cast / turnout	23,015	54.71	+1.01		
Abstentions	19,055	45.29	−1.01		
Registered voters	42,070				

=== Seville ===
Population: 714,148

=== Utrera ===
Population: 45,008

← Summary of the 28 May 1995 City Council of Utrera election results →
Parties and alliances	Popular vote			Seats	
Parties and alliances	Votes	%	±pp	Total	+/−
Spanish Socialist Workers' Party of Andalusia (PSOE–A)	10,271	47.67	−19.84	11	−4
People's Party (PP)	4,713	21.88	+12.09	5	+3
United Left/The Greens–Assembly for Andalusia (IULV–CA)	3,177	14.75	+8.01	3	+2
Andalusian Party (PA)	2,118	9.83	−5.30	2	−1
Independents from Utrera (IU)	827	3.84	New	0	±0
Andalusian Progress Party (PAP)	120	0.56	New	0	±0
Blank ballots	319	1.48	+0.66		
Total	21,545			21	±0
Valid votes	21,545	99.71	±0.00		
Invalid votes	63	0.29	±0.00		
Votes cast / turnout	21,608	65.30	+7.43		
Abstentions	11,480	34.70	−7.43		
Registered voters	33,088				

=== Vélez-Málaga ===
Population: 54,327

← Summary of the 28 May 1995 City Council of Vélez-Málaga election results →
Parties and alliances	Popular vote			Seats	
Parties and alliances	Votes	%	±pp	Total	+/−
People's Party (PP)	5,739	20.83	+11.63	6	+4
Spanish Socialist Workers' Party of Andalusia (PSOE–A)	5,615	20.38	−1.76	6	±0
Pro-Torre del Mar Municipality Independent Group (GIPMTM)	5,240	19.02	−0.22	5	±0
United Left/The Greens–Assembly for Andalusia (IULV–CA)	4,008	14.55	+6.35	4	+2
Andalusian Party (PA)	2,344	8.51	−1.77	2	−1
Independent Solution (SI)	1,621	5.88	−4.61	1	−2
La Axarquía Progress (PAX)	1,472	5.34	−10.50	1	−3
Andalusian Progress Party (PAP)	1,059	3.84	New	0	±0
Spanish Phalanx of the CNSO (FE–JONS)	134	0.49	+0.16	0	±0
Liberal Democratic Union (UDL)	106	0.38	New	0	±0
Blank ballots	212	0.77	+0.31		
Total	27,550			25	±0
Valid votes	27,550	99.66	+0.15		
Invalid votes	94	0.34	−0.15		
Votes cast / turnout	27,644	69.81	+4.98		
Abstentions	11,957	30.19	−4.98		
Registered voters	39,601				
