= 1991 Spanish local elections in Andalusia =

This article presents the results breakdown of the local elections held in Andalusia on 26 May 1991. The following tables show detailed results in the autonomous community's most populous municipalities, sorted alphabetically.

== City control ==
The following table lists party control in the most populous municipalities, including provincial capitals (highlighted in bold). Gains for a party are highlighted in that party's colour.

Municipality	Population	Previous control	New control
Alcalá de Guadaíra	52,168	Spanish Socialist Workers' Party of Andalusia (PSOE–A)	Spanish Socialist Workers' Party of Andalusia (PSOE–A)
Algeciras	102,079	Spanish Socialist Workers' Party of Andalusia (PSOE–A)	Spanish Socialist Workers' Party of Andalusia (PSOE–A)
**Almería**	161,566	Spanish Socialist Workers' Party of Andalusia (PSOE–A)	Spanish Socialist Workers' Party of Andalusia (PSOE–A)
Antequera	41,863	Spanish Socialist Workers' Party of Andalusia (PSOE–A)	Spanish Socialist Workers' Party of Andalusia (PSOE–A)
Benalmádena	24,972	Independent Group of Benalmádena and Arroyo–Costa (GIBAC)	Spanish Socialist Workers' Party of Andalusia (PSOE–A)
**Cádiz**	156,903	Spanish Socialist Workers' Party of Andalusia (PSOE–A)	Spanish Socialist Workers' Party of Andalusia (PSOE–A)
Chiclana de la Frontera	44,998	Spanish Socialist Workers' Party of Andalusia (PSOE–A)	Spanish Socialist Workers' Party of Andalusia (PSOE–A)
**Córdoba**	307,275	United Left–Assembly for Andalusia (IU–CA)	United Left–Assembly for Andalusia (IU–CA)
Dos Hermanas	72,717	Spanish Socialist Workers' Party of Andalusia (PSOE–A)	Spanish Socialist Workers' Party of Andalusia (PSOE–A)
Écija	36,673	Spanish Socialist Workers' Party of Andalusia (PSOE–A)	Spanish Socialist Workers' Party of Andalusia (PSOE–A)
El Ejido	41,080	Spanish Socialist Workers' Party of Andalusia (PSOE–A)	People's Party (PP)
El Puerto de Santa María	64,849	Spanish Socialist Workers' Party of Andalusia (PSOE–A)	Portuese Independents (IP)
Fuengirola	41,778	Spanish Socialist Workers' Party of Andalusia (PSOE–A)	People's Party (PP) (PSOE–A in 1993)
**Granada**	268,674	Spanish Socialist Workers' Party of Andalusia (PSOE–A)	Spanish Socialist Workers' Party of Andalusia (PSOE–A)
**Huelva**	141,002	Spanish Socialist Workers' Party of Andalusia (PSOE–A)	Spanish Socialist Workers' Party of Andalusia (PSOE–A)
**Jaén**	109,338	People's Party (PP)	Spanish Socialist Workers' Party of Andalusia (PSOE–A)
Jerez de la Frontera	186,812	Andalusian Party (PA)	Andalusian Party (PA) (PAP in 1992)
La Línea de la Concepción	61,597	Spanish Socialist Workers' Party of Andalusia (PSOE–A)	Spanish Socialist Workers' Party of Andalusia (PSOE–A)
Linares	59,150	Spanish Socialist Workers' Party of Andalusia (PSOE–A)	Spanish Socialist Workers' Party of Andalusia (PSOE–A)
**Málaga**	560,495	Spanish Socialist Workers' Party of Andalusia (PSOE–A)	Spanish Socialist Workers' Party of Andalusia (PSOE–A)
Marbella	81,876	Spanish Socialist Workers' Party of Andalusia (PSOE–A)	Liberal Independent Group (GIL)
Morón de la Frontera	29,191	People's Party (PP)	Spanish Socialist Workers' Party of Andalusia (PSOE–A)
Motril	47,267	Spanish Socialist Workers' Party of Andalusia (PSOE–A)	Spanish Socialist Workers' Party of Andalusia (PSOE–A)
Ronda	34,102	Spanish Socialist Workers' Party of Andalusia (PSOE–A)	Spanish Socialist Workers' Party of Andalusia (PSOE–A)
San Fernando	83,923	Andalusian Party (PA)	Andalusian Party (PA)
Sanlúcar de Barrameda	56,375	Spanish Socialist Workers' Party of Andalusia (PSOE–A)	Spanish Socialist Workers' Party of Andalusia (PSOE–A)
**Seville**	678,218	Spanish Socialist Workers' Party of Andalusia (PSOE–A)	Andalusian Party (PA)
Utrera	43,006	Spanish Socialist Workers' Party of Andalusia (PSOE–A)	Spanish Socialist Workers' Party of Andalusia (PSOE–A)
Vélez-Málaga	54,234	Spanish Socialist Workers' Party of Andalusia (PSOE–A)	La Axarquía Progress (PAX) (PSOE–A in 1992)

== Municipalities ==
=== Alcalá de Guadaíra ===
Population: 52,168

← Summary of the 26 May 1991 City Council of Alcalá de Guadaíra election results →
Parties and alliances	Popular vote			Seats	
Parties and alliances	Votes	%	±pp	Total	+/−
Spanish Socialist Workers' Party of Andalusia (PSOE–A)	10,921	58.15	−6.21	15	−3
Andalusian Party (PA)	3,729	19.85	+1.17	5	±0
United Left–Assembly for Andalusia (IU–CA)	2,379	12.67	+2.36	3	+1
People's Party (PP)^{1}	1,563	8.32	+6.82	2	+2
Blank ballots	190	1.01	−0.10		
Total	18,782			25	±0
Valid votes	18,782	99.44	+0.55		
Invalid votes	106	0.56	−0.55		
Votes cast / turnout	18,888	51.88	−11.47		
Abstentions	17,521	48.12	+11.47		
Registered voters	36,409				
Sources
Footnotes: ^{1} People's Party results are compared to People's Democratic Party totals in the 1987 election.

=== Algeciras ===
Population: 102,079

← Summary of the 26 May 1991 City Council of Algeciras election results →
Parties and alliances	Popular vote			Seats	
Parties and alliances	Votes	%	±pp	Total	+/−
Spanish Socialist Workers' Party of Andalusia (PSOE–A)	11,507	35.36	−9.65	11	−2
Andalusian Party (PA)	9,347	28.72	+20.81	8	+6
People's Party (PP)^{1}	6,839	21.02	+4.72	6	+2
United Left–Assembly for Andalusia (IU–CA)	2,737	8.41	−1.47	2	±0
Democratic and Social Centre (CDS)	1,202	3.69	−2.94	0	−1
Workers' Socialist Party (PST)	785	2.41	New	0	±0
Andalusian Liberation (LA)	n/a	n/a	−13.03	0	−3
Blank ballots	124	0.38	−0.67		
Total	32,541			27	+2
Valid votes	32,541	99.29	+0.61		
Invalid votes	232	0.71	−0.61		
Votes cast / turnout	32,773	46.22	−11.09		
Abstentions	38,129	53.78	+11.09		
Registered voters	70,902				
Sources
Footnotes: ^{1} People's Party results are compared to the combined totals of People's Alliance and People's Democratic Party in the 1987 election.

=== Almería ===
Population: 161,566

← Summary of the 26 May 1991 City Council of Almería election results →
Parties and alliances	Popular vote			Seats	
Parties and alliances	Votes	%	±pp	Total	+/−
Spanish Socialist Workers' Party of Andalusia (PSOE–A)	24,796	40.43	+0.13	12	±0
People's Party (PP)^{1}	20,965	34.18	+6.55	10	+2
United Left–Assembly for Andalusia (IU–CA)	5,798	9.45	−3.22	3	±0
Andalusian Party (PA)	3,922	6.39	+3.47	2	+2
Almerian Unity Party (UNAL)	1,664	2.71	New	0	±0
Democratic and Social Centre (CDS)	1,573	2.56	−12.02	0	−4
The Greens of Andalusia (LVA)	866	1.41	New	0	±0
Socialist Democracy (DS)	622	1.01	New	0	±0
Integration Party for Almeria and its Peoples (PIAP)	514	0.84	New	0	±0
The Greens Ecologist–Humanist List (LVLE–H)	194	0.32	New	0	±0
Blank ballots	423	0.69	−0.11		
Total	61,337			27	±0
Valid votes	61,337	99.73	+1.11		
Invalid votes	167	0.27	−1.11		
Votes cast / turnout	61,504	52.67	−7.91		
Abstentions	55,275	47.33	+7.91		
Registered voters	116,779				
Sources
Footnotes: ^{1} People's Party results are compared to the combined totals of People's Alliance and People's Democratic Party in the 1987 election.

=== Antequera ===
Population: 41,863

← Summary of the 26 May 1991 City Council of Antequera election results →
Parties and alliances	Popular vote			Seats	
Parties and alliances	Votes	%	±pp	Total	+/−
Spanish Socialist Workers' Party of Andalusia (PSOE–A)	9,390	50.20	+8.19	12	+2
People's Party (PP)^{1}	3,277	17.52	+1.55	4	±0
Independent Solution (SI)	1,692	9.05	−10.08	2	−3
Andalusian Workers' Group (ATA)	1,530	8.18	+1.42	2	+1
United Left–Assembly for Andalusia (IU–CA)	1,307	6.99	−0.33	1	±0
Socialist Democracy (DS)	851	4.55	New	0	±0
Andalusian Party (PA)	566	3.03	New	0	±0
Blank ballots	92	0.49	−0.32		
Total	18,705			21	±0
Valid votes	18,705	99.60	+0.59		
Invalid votes	76	0.40	−0.59		
Votes cast / turnout	18,781	61.43	−0.43		
Abstentions	11,790	38.57	+0.43		
Registered voters	30,571				
Sources
Footnotes: ^{1} People's Party results are compared to People's Alliance totals in the 1987 election.

=== Benalmádena ===
Population: 24,972

← Summary of the 26 May 1991 City Council of Benalmádena election results →
Parties and alliances	Popular vote			Seats	
Parties and alliances	Votes	%	±pp	Total	+/−
Spanish Socialist Workers' Party of Andalusia (PSOE–A)	2,914	39.49	+11.09	11	+5
People's Party (PP)^{1}	863	11.70	−15.53	3	−2
Democratic and Social Centre (CDS)	802	10.87	+2.92	3	+2
United Left–Assembly for Andalusia (IU–CA)	734	9.95	+2.91	2	+1
Benalmádena Independent Municipal Unity (UMIB)	420	5.69	New	1	+1
Andalusian Party (PA)	393	5.33	+3.04	1	+1
Benalmádena Progress Union (UPB)	356	4.82	New	0	±0
Independent Group of Benalmádena, Arroyo and Costa (GIBAC)	296	4.01	−17.73	0	−4
Benalmádena Democratic Union (BUD)	288	3.90	New	0	±0
Benalmádena Independent Group (AIB)	100	1.36	New	0	±0
Independent Solution (SI)	81	1.10	New	0	±0
The Greens of Andalusia (LVA)	74	1.00	New	0	±0
Blank ballots	58	0.79	−0.14		
Total	7,379			21	+4
Valid votes	7,379	99.51	+0.55		
Invalid votes	36	0.49	−0.55		
Votes cast / turnout	7,415	56.48	−7.89		
Abstentions	5,713	43.52	+7.89		
Registered voters	13,128				
Sources
Footnotes: ^{1} People's Party results are compared to the combined totals of People's Alliance and People's Democratic Party in the 1987 election.

=== Cádiz ===
Population: 156,903

← Summary of the 26 May 1991 City Council of Cádiz election results →
Parties and alliances	Popular vote			Seats	
Parties and alliances	Votes	%	±pp	Total	+/−
Spanish Socialist Workers' Party of Andalusia (PSOE–A)	24,449	46.49	−4.23	14	−2
People's Party (PP)^{1}	13,322	25.33	−0.83	7	±0
United Left–Assembly for Andalusia (IU–CA)	6,450	12.27	+4.60	3	+1
Andalusian Party (PA)	5,701	10.84	+6.66	3	+3
Democratic and Social Centre (CDS)	1,390	2.64	−6.11	0	−2
Andalusian Popular Unity (UPAN)	266	0.51	New	0	±0
Spanish Phalanx of the CNSO (FE–JONS)	224	0.43	New	0	±0
Blank ballots	783	1.49	+0.28		
Total	52,585			27	±0
Valid votes	52,585	99.23	+1.58		
Invalid votes	407	0.77	−1.58		
Votes cast / turnout	52,992	45.36	−10.03		
Abstentions	63,832	54.64	+10.03		
Registered voters	116,824				
Sources
Footnotes: ^{1} People's Party results are compared to the combined totals of People's Alliance and People's Democratic Party in the 1987 election.

=== Chiclana de la Frontera ===
Population: 44,998

← Summary of the 26 May 1991 City Council of Chiclana de la Frontera election results →
Parties and alliances	Popular vote			Seats	
Parties and alliances	Votes	%	±pp	Total	+/−
Spanish Socialist Workers' Party of Andalusia (PSOE–A)	8,497	62.09	−2.08	14	−1
Andalusian Party (PA)	1,640	11.98	+6.23	2	+1
People's Party (PP)^{1}	1,418	10.36	+1.99	2	+1
United Left–Assembly for Andalusia (IU–CA)	1,169	8.54	+1.11	2	+1
Democratic and Social Centre (CDS)	876	6.40	−7.25	1	−2
Blank ballots	85	0.62	±0.00		
Total	13,685			21	±0
Valid votes	13,685	99.51	+0.33		
Invalid votes	67	0.49	−0.33		
Votes cast / turnout	13,752	45.36	−10.10		
Abstentions	16,564	54.64	+10.10		
Registered voters	30,316				
Sources
Footnotes: ^{1} People's Party results are compared to People's Alliance totals in the 1987 election.

=== Córdoba ===
Population: 307,275

← Summary of the 26 May 1991 City Council of Córdoba election results →
Parties and alliances	Popular vote			Seats	
Parties and alliances	Votes	%	±pp	Total	+/−
United Left–Assembly for Andalusia (IU–CA)	48,051	39.88	+4.06	13	+3
Spanish Socialist Workers' Party of Andalusia (PSOE–A)	35,711	29.64	−0.39	9	±0
People's Party (PP)^{1}	28,113	23.33	−0.27	7	±0
Andalusian Party (PA)	5,966	4.95	+2.79	0	±0
Democratic and Social Centre (CDS)	1,642	1.36	−4.55	0	−1
Blank ballots	1,007	0.84	+0.09		
Total	120,490			29	+2
Valid votes	120,490	99.57	+0.52		
Invalid votes	518	0.43	−0.52		
Votes cast / turnout	121,008	53.47	−11.65		
Abstentions	105,310	46.53	+11.65		
Registered voters	226,318				
Sources
Footnotes: ^{1} People's Party results are compared to the combined totals of People's Alliance and People's Democratic Party–Liberal Party: Centrists of Córdoba in the 1987 election.

=== Dos Hermanas ===
Population: 72,717

← Summary of the 26 May 1991 City Council of Dos Hermanas election results →
Parties and alliances	Popular vote			Seats	
Parties and alliances	Votes	%	±pp	Total	+/−
Spanish Socialist Workers' Party of Andalusia (PSOE–A)	15,251	60.65	−3.89	16	−1
United Left–Assembly for Andalusia (IU–CA)	4,462	17.75	+1.47	4	±0
People's Party (PP)^{1}	2,774	11.03	−0.09	3	±0
Andalusian Party (PA)	2,266	9.01	New	2	+2
Democratic and Social Centre (CDS)	166	0.66	New	0	±0
Workers' Party of Spain–Communist Unity (PTE–UC)	n/a	n/a	−5.89	0	−1
Blank ballots	225	0.89	−0.05		
Total	25,144			25	±0
Valid votes	25,144	99.68	+0.56		
Invalid votes	81	0.32	−0.56		
Votes cast / turnout	25,225	50.94	−11.59		
Abstentions	24,298	49.06	+11.59		
Registered voters	49,523				
Sources
Footnotes: ^{1} People's Party results are compared to the combined totals of People's Alliance and People's Democratic Party in the 1987 election.

=== Écija ===
Population: 36,673

← Summary of the 26 May 1991 City Council of Écija election results →
Parties and alliances	Popular vote			Seats	
Parties and alliances	Votes	%	±pp	Total	+/−
Spanish Socialist Workers' Party of Andalusia (PSOE–A)	8,463	49.74	+7.10	11	+1
Andalusian Party (PA)	5,211	30.63	−2.64	7	±0
People's Party (PP)^{1}	2,053	12.07	−0.50	2	−1
United Left–Assembly for Andalusia (IU–CA)	1,186	6.97	+1.09	1	±0
Blank ballots	101	0.59	+0.18		
Total	17,014			21	±0
Valid votes	17,014	99.65	+0.48		
Invalid votes	59	0.35	−0.48		
Votes cast / turnout	17,073	65.42	−0.78		
Abstentions	9,025	34.58	+0.78		
Registered voters	26,098				
Sources
Footnotes: ^{1} People's Party results are compared to People's Alliance totals in the 1987 election.

=== El Ejido ===
Population: 41,080

← Summary of the 26 May 1991 City Council of El Ejido election results →
Parties and alliances	Popular vote			Seats	
Parties and alliances	Votes	%	±pp	Total	+/−
People's Party (PP)^{1}	5,910	40.99	+22.01	10	+6
Spanish Socialist Workers' Party of Andalusia (PSOE–A)	5,860	40.64	+3.23	9	±0
Democratic and Social Centre (CDS)	951	6.60	−11.73	1	−3
United Left–Assembly for Andalusia (IU–CA)	898	6.23	−0.24	1	±0
Andalusian Party (PA)	697	4.83	+3.35	0	±0
Agriculture First (ALPO)	n/a	n/a	−9.63	0	−2
Independent Candidacy of Santa María del Águila–Las Norias (CIAN)	n/a	n/a	−7.27	0	−1
Blank ballots	103	0.71	+0.29		
Total	14,419			21	±0
Valid votes	14,419	99.75	+0.84		
Invalid votes	36	0.25	−0.84		
Votes cast / turnout	14,455	52.80	−4.26		
Abstentions	12,923	47.20	+4.26		
Registered voters	27,378				
Sources
Footnotes: ^{1} People's Party results are compared to People's Alliance totals in the 1987 election.

=== El Puerto de Santa María ===
Population: 64,849

← Summary of the 26 May 1991 City Council of El Puerto de Santa María election results →
Parties and alliances	Popular vote			Seats	
Parties and alliances	Votes	%	±pp	Total	+/−
Portuese Independents (IP)	6,213	30.26	New	8	+8
Spanish Socialist Workers' Party of Andalusia (PSOE–A)	5,241	25.52	−11.98	7	−3
United Left–Assembly for Andalusia (IU–CA)	3,402	16.57	−8.03	4	−3
People's Party (PP)^{1}	2,936	14.30	−9.73	4	−2
Andalusian Party (PA)	1,618	7.88	+3.07	2	+2
Democratic and Social Centre (CDS)	900	4.38	−3.64	0	−2
Blank ballots	223	1.09	+0.05		
Total	20,533			25	±0
Valid votes	20,533	99.48	+0.99		
Invalid votes	107	0.52	−0.99		
Votes cast / turnout	20,640	45.28	−5.10		
Abstentions	24,948	54.72	+5.10		
Registered voters	45,588				
Sources
Footnotes: ^{1} People's Party results are compared to the combined totals of People's Alliance and People's Democratic Party in the 1987 election.

=== Fuengirola ===
Population: 41,778

← Summary of the 26 May 1991 City Council of Fuengirola election results →
Parties and alliances	Popular vote			Seats	
Parties and alliances	Votes	%	±pp	Total	+/−
Spanish Socialist Workers' Party of Andalusia (PSOE–A)	5,581	35.27	−9.70	9	−1
People's Party (PP)^{1}	4,242	26.81	+6.03	7	+2
Independent Solution (SI)	3,598	22.74	+5.70	5	+1
United Left–Assembly for Andalusia (IU–CA)	775	4.90	−2.29	0	−1
Andalusian Party (PA)	678	4.29	+2.46	0	±0
The Greens of Andalusia (LVA)	593	3.75	New	0	±0
Democratic and Social Centre (CDS)	280	1.77	−5.44	0	−1
Blank ballots	75	0.47	−0.51		
Total	15,822			21	±0
Valid votes	15,822	99.58	+0.44		
Invalid votes	66	0.42	−0.44		
Votes cast / turnout	15,888	59.28	−4.98		
Abstentions	10,914	40.72	+4.98		
Registered voters	26,802				
Sources
Footnotes: ^{1} People's Party results are compared to People's Alliance totals in the 1987 election.

=== Granada ===
Population: 268,674

← Summary of the 26 May 1991 City Council of Granada election results →
Parties and alliances	Popular vote			Seats	
Parties and alliances	Votes	%	±pp	Total	+/−
People's Party (PP)^{1}	45,256	41.10	+4.46	13	+2
Spanish Socialist Workers' Party of Andalusia (PSOE–A)	42,390	38.50	−1.61	12	±0
United Left–Assembly for Andalusia (IU–CA)	9,811	8.91	+0.50	2	±0
Andalusian Party (PA)	4,686	4.26	+2.19	0	±0
The Greens of Andalusia (LVA)	2,274	2.07	New	0	±0
Granadan Unity (UGR)	2,185	1.98	New	0	±0
Democratic and Social Centre (CDS)	1,924	1.75	−7.64	0	−2
The Greens Ecologist–Humanist List (LVLE–H)^{2}	431	0.39	+0.19	0	±0
Spanish Phalanx of the CNSO (FE–JONS)	144	0.13	−0.21	0	±0
Andalusian Popular Unity (UPAN)	126	0.11	New	0	±0
Blank ballots	877	0.80	+0.01		
Total	110,104			27	±0
Valid votes	110,104	99.61	+1.17		
Invalid votes	426	0.39	−1.17		
Votes cast / turnout	110,530	54.80	−9.36		
Abstentions	91,173	45.20	+9.36		
Registered voters	201,703				
Sources
Footnotes: ^{1} People's Party results are compared to the combined totals of People's Alliance and People's Democratic Party in the 1987 election.; ^{2} The Greens Ecologist–Humanist List results are compared to Humanist Platform totals in the 1987 election.

=== Huelva ===
Population: 141,002

← Summary of the 26 May 1991 City Council of Huelva election results →
Parties and alliances	Popular vote			Seats	
Parties and alliances	Votes	%	±pp	Total	+/−
Spanish Socialist Workers' Party of Andalusia (PSOE–A)	23,326	51.52	+5.70	16	+2
People's Party (PP)^{1}	11,201	24.74	+2.55	7	+1
United Left–Assembly for Andalusia (IU–CA)	4,358	9.63	+0.35	2	−1
Andalusian Party (PA)	3,221	7.11	+3.44	2	+2
Democratic and Social Centre (CDS)	1,392	3.07	−11.35	0	−4
The Greens of Andalusia (LVA)	813	1.80	New	0	±0
Andalusian Nation (NA)	489	1.08	New	0	±0
Andalusian Popular Unity (UPAN)	162	0.36	New	0	±0
Blank ballots	310	0.68	−0.48		
Total	45,272			27	±0
Valid votes	45,272	99.63	+1.16		
Invalid votes	169	0.37	−1.16		
Votes cast / turnout	45,441	44.64	−8.43		
Abstentions	56,354	55.36	+8.43		
Registered voters	101,795				
Sources
Footnotes: ^{1} People's Party results are compared to the combined totals of People's Alliance and People's Democratic Party in the 1987 election.

=== Jaén ===
Population: 109,338

← Summary of the 26 May 1991 City Council of Jaén election results →
Parties and alliances	Popular vote			Seats	
Parties and alliances	Votes	%	±pp	Total	+/−
People's Party (PP)^{1}	19,261	40.99	+3.08	12	+1
Spanish Socialist Workers' Party of Andalusia (PSOE–A)	18,803	40.01	+1.23	12	+1
United Left–Assembly for Andalusia (IU–CA)	3,299	7.02	−1.51	2	±0
Andalusian Party (PA)	2,716	5.78	+3.55	1	+1
Socialist Democracy (DS)	1,431	3.05	New	0	±0
Democratic and Social Centre (CDS)	798	1.70	−8.61	0	−3
Socialist October (OS)	237	0.50	New	0	±0
Andalusian Nation (NA)	103	0.22	New	0	±0
Spanish Phalanx of the CNSO (FE–JONS)	72	0.15	New	0	±0
Blank ballots	270	0.57	−0.16		
Total	46,990			27	±0
Valid votes	46,990	99.61	+0.76		
Invalid votes	186	0.39	−0.76		
Votes cast / turnout	47,176	60.68	−6.32		
Abstentions	30,574	39.32	+6.32		
Registered voters	77,750				
Sources
Footnotes: ^{1} People's Party results are compared to the combined totals of People's Alliance and People's Democratic Party in the 1987 election.

=== Jerez de la Frontera ===
Population: 186,812

← Summary of the 26 May 1991 City Council of Jerez de la Frontera election results →
Parties and alliances	Popular vote			Seats	
Parties and alliances	Votes	%	±pp	Total	+/−
Andalusian Party (PA)	36,113	53.78	−3.08	16	−1
Spanish Socialist Workers' Party of Andalusia (PSOE–A)	17,849	26.58	+2.91	7	±0
People's Party (PP)^{1}	6,741	10.04	−1.03	2	−1
United Left–Assembly for Andalusia (IU–CA)	4,705	7.01	+2.50	2	+2
Jerezan People for Jerez (JJ)	1,105	1.65	New	0	±0
Spanish Phalanx of the CNSO (FE–JONS)	166	0.25	+0.01	0	±0
Blank ballots	466	0.69	+0.05		
Total	67,145			27	±0
Valid votes	67,145	99.71	+1.67		
Invalid votes	196	0.29	−1.67		
Votes cast / turnout	67,341	50.40	−13.60		
Abstentions	66,276	49.60	+13.60		
Registered voters	133,617				
Sources
Footnotes: ^{1} People's Party results are compared to the combined totals of People's Alliance and People's Democratic Party in the 1987 election.

=== La Línea de la Concepción ===
Population: 61,597

← Summary of the 26 May 1991 City Council of La Línea de la Concepción election results →
Parties and alliances	Popular vote			Seats	
Parties and alliances	Votes	%	±pp	Total	+/−
Spanish Socialist Workers' Party of Andalusia (PSOE–A)	9,337	43.54	−11.17	11	−5
Andalusian Party (PA)	5,157	24.05	+12.15	6	+3
People's Party (PP)^{1}	4,758	22.19	+2.80	6	+1
United Left–Assembly for Andalusia (IU–CA)	1,685	7.86	+3.47	2	+2
Democratic and Social Centre (CDS)	361	1.68	−3.41	0	−1
Blank ballots	147	0.69	−0.34		
Total	21,445			25	±0
Valid votes	21,445	99.17	+0.19		
Invalid votes	180	0.83	−0.19		
Votes cast / turnout	21,625	48.88	−12.71		
Abstentions	22,612	51.12	+12.71		
Registered voters	44,237				
Sources
Footnotes: ^{1} People's Party results are compared to People's Alliance totals in the 1987 election.

=== Linares ===
Population: 59,150

← Summary of the 26 May 1991 City Council of Linares election results →
Parties and alliances	Popular vote			Seats	
Parties and alliances	Votes	%	±pp	Total	+/−
Spanish Socialist Workers' Party of Andalusia (PSOE–A)	8,474	33.34	−3.77	9	−1
Andalusian Party (PA)	6,718	26.43	+23.45	7	+7
United Left–Assembly for Andalusia (IU–CA)	5,686	22.37	−2.39	6	±0
People's Party (PP)^{1}	3,643	14.33	−4.89	3	−2
Democratic and Social Centre (CDS)	720	2.83	−12.15	0	−4
Blank ballots	174	0.68	−0.06		
Total	25,415			25	±0
Valid votes	25,415	99.21	+0.01		
Invalid votes	203	0.79	−0.01		
Votes cast / turnout	25,618	59.09	−9.29		
Abstentions	17,737	40.91	+9.29		
Registered voters	43,355				
Sources
Footnotes: ^{1} People's Party results are compared to People's Alliance totals in the 1987 election.

=== Málaga ===
Population: 560,495

← Summary of the 26 May 1991 City Council of Málaga election results →
Parties and alliances	Popular vote			Seats	
Parties and alliances	Votes	%	±pp	Total	+/−
Spanish Socialist Workers' Party of Andalusia (PSOE–A)	87,847	49.40	+0.36	17	±0
People's Party (PP)^{1}	46,169	25.96	+1.69	8	+1
United Left–Assembly for Andalusia (IU–CA)	22,628	12.72	+0.92	4	±0
Andalusian Party (PA)	10,765	6.05	+3.27	2	+2
The Greens of Andalusia (LVA)	4,186	2.35	New	0	±0
Democratic and Social Centre (CDS)	2,675	1.50	−7.85	0	−3
Independent Solution (SI)	892	0.50	New	0	±0
Andalusian Popular Unity (UPAN)	536	0.30	New	0	±0
Christians for Democracy (CPD)	355	0.20	New	0	±0
Andalusian Nation (NA)	219	0.12	New	0	±0
Blank ballots	1,462	0.82	+0.05		
Total	177,826			31	±0
Valid votes	177,826	99.58	+1.09		
Invalid votes	754	0.42	−1.09		
Votes cast / turnout	178,580	47.62	−8.61		
Abstentions	196,398	52.38	+8.61		
Registered voters	374,978				
Sources
Footnotes: ^{1} People's Party results are compared to the combined totals of People's Alliance and People's Democratic Party in the 1987 election.

=== Marbella ===
Population: 81,876

← Summary of the 26 May 1991 City Council of Marbella election results →
Parties and alliances	Popular vote			Seats	
Parties and alliances	Votes	%	±pp	Total	+/−
Liberal Independent Group (GIL)	20,531	65.68	New	19	+19
Spanish Socialist Workers' Party of Andalusia (PSOE–A)	4,467	14.29	−13.08	4	−4
San Pedro de Alcántara Pro-Independence Association (ISP)	2,348	7.51	−8.79	2	−3
United Left–Assembly for Andalusia (IU–CA)	1,246	3.99	−14.08	0	−5
People's Party (PP)^{1}	1,060	3.39	−22.28	0	−7
Independent Group for Marbella and San Pedro de Alcántara (GIM)	543	1.74	−3.25	0	±0
Andalusian Party (PA)	452	1.45	New	0	±0
Democratic and Social Centre (CDS)	225	0.72	−3.88	0	±0
Andalusian Nation (NA)	150	0.48	New	0	±0
Blank ballots	237	0.76	−0.28		
Total	31,259			25	±0
Valid votes	31,259	98.21	−0.60		
Invalid votes	569	1.79	+0.60		
Votes cast / turnout	31,828	64.64	+6.81		
Abstentions	17,413	35.36	−6.81		
Registered voters	49,241				
Sources
Footnotes: ^{1} People's Party results are compared to the combined totals of People's Alliance and People's Democratic Party in the 1987 election.

=== Morón de la Frontera ===
Population: 29,191

← Summary of the 26 May 1991 City Council of Morón de la Frontera election results →
Parties and alliances	Popular vote			Seats	
Parties and alliances	Votes	%	±pp	Total	+/−
Spanish Socialist Workers' Party of Andalusia (PSOE–A)	4,715	39.36	+10.30	9	+3
United Left–Assembly for Andalusia (IU–CA)	3,981	33.24	+2.32	7	±0
People's Party (PP)^{1}	2,770	23.13	−11.28	5	−3
Andalusian Party (PA)	438	3.66	+1.82	0	±0
Blank ballots	74	0.62	+0.17		
Total	11,978			21	±0
Valid votes	11,978	99.79	+0.85		
Invalid votes	25	0.21	−0.85		
Votes cast / turnout	12,003	56.16	−13.85		
Abstentions	9,368	43.84	+13.85		
Registered voters	21,371				
Sources
Footnotes: ^{1} People's Party results are compared to People's Alliance totals in the 1987 election.

=== Motril ===
Population: 47,267

← Summary of the 26 May 1991 City Council of Motril election results →
Parties and alliances	Popular vote			Seats	
Parties and alliances	Votes	%	±pp	Total	+/−
Spanish Socialist Workers' Party of Andalusia (PSOE–A)	9,365	50.60	+3.62	12	+1
People's Party (PP)^{1}	4,826	26.07	+4.22	6	+1
United Left–Assembly for Andalusia (IU–CA)	2,002	10.82	−2.28	2	−1
Andalusian Party (PA)	1,447	7.82	+1.80	1	±0
The Greens of Andalusia (LVA)	419	2.26	New	0	±0
Democratic and Social Centre (CDS)	323	1.75	−5.84	0	−1
Blank ballots	127	0.69	−0.10		
Total	18,509			21	±0
Valid votes	18,509	99.47	+0.60		
Invalid votes	99	0.53	−0.60		
Votes cast / turnout	18,608	55.68	−3.47		
Abstentions	14,810	44.32	+3.47		
Registered voters	33,418				
Sources
Footnotes: ^{1} People's Party results are compared to People's Alliance totals in the 1987 election.

=== Ronda ===
Population: 34,102

← Summary of the 26 May 1991 City Council of Ronda election results →
Parties and alliances	Popular vote			Seats	
Parties and alliances	Votes	%	±pp	Total	+/−
Spanish Socialist Workers' Party of Andalusia (PSOE–A)	6,688	49.34	+16.90	11	+3
Andalusian Party (PA)	2,337	17.24	−5.09	4	−1
People's Party (PP)^{1}	1,938	14.30	−13.85	3	−3
Rondenians for Ronda (RPR)	1,395	10.29	New	2	+2
United Left–Assembly for Andalusia (IU–CA)	1,105	8.15	−2.28	1	−1
Blank ballots	93	0.69	−0.43		
Total	13,556			21	±0
Valid votes	13,556	99.58	+1.70		
Invalid votes	57	0.42	−1.70		
Votes cast / turnout	13,613	55.00	−5.37		
Abstentions	11,140	45.00	+5.37		
Registered voters	24,753				
Sources
Footnotes: ^{1} People's Party results are compared to the combined totals of People's Alliance and People's Democratic Party in the 1987 election.

=== San Fernando ===
Population: 83,923

← Summary of the 26 May 1991 City Council of San Fernando election results →
Parties and alliances	Popular vote			Seats	
Parties and alliances	Votes	%	±pp	Total	+/−
Andalusian Party (PA)	14,899	55.79	+22.32	16	+7
Spanish Socialist Workers' Party of Andalusia (PSOE–A)	5,741	21.50	−13.63	6	−4
People's Party (PP)^{1}	3,017	11.30	−7.64	3	−2
Islander Independent Party (PII)	1,282	4.80	New	0	±0
United Left–Assembly for Andalusia (IU–CA)	1,229	4.60	−0.07	0	±0
Democratic and Social Centre (CDS)	321	1.20	−4.82	0	−1
Blank ballots	217	0.81	−0.08		
Total	26,706			25	±0
Valid votes	26,706	99.57	+1.15		
Invalid votes	116	0.43	−1.15		
Votes cast / turnout	26,822	46.11	−8.68		
Abstentions	31,344	53.89	+8.68		
Registered voters	58,166				
Sources
Footnotes: ^{1} People's Party results are compared to the combined totals of People's Alliance and People's Democratic Party–Liberal Party: Centrists of Cádiz in the 1987 election.

=== Sanlúcar de Barrameda ===
Population: 56,375

← Summary of the 26 May 1991 City Council of Sanlúcar de Barrameda election results →
Parties and alliances	Popular vote			Seats	
Parties and alliances	Votes	%	±pp	Total	+/−
Spanish Socialist Workers' Party of Andalusia (PSOE–A)	8,331	40.07	+5.09	11	+2
United Left–Assembly for Andalusia (IU–CA)	7,297	35.10	−5.35	9	−2
People's Party (PP)^{1}	2,195	10.56	+3.20	3	+1
Andalusian Neighbourhood Independent Group (GIBA)	1,872	9.00	New	2	+2
Andalusian Party (PA)	837	4.03	+1.45	0	±0
Andalusian Popular Unity (UPAN)	144	0.69	New	0	±0
Democratic and Social Centre (CDS)	n/a	n/a	−10.76	0	−3
Blank ballots	114	0.55	+0.06		
Total	20,790			25	±0
Valid votes	20,790	99.73	+0.55		
Invalid votes	56	0.27	−0.55		
Votes cast / turnout	20,846	53.70	−5.38		
Abstentions	17,974	46.30	+5.38		
Registered voters	38,820				
Sources
Footnotes: ^{1} People's Party results are compared to People's Alliance totals in the 1987 election.

=== Seville ===
Population: 678,218

=== Utrera ===
Population: 43,006

← Summary of the 26 May 1991 City Council of Utrera election results →
Parties and alliances	Popular vote			Seats	
Parties and alliances	Votes	%	±pp	Total	+/−
Spanish Socialist Workers' Party of Andalusia (PSOE–A)	11,905	67.51	−1.63	15	−1
Andalusian Party (PA)	2,668	15.13	+5.33	3	+1
People's Party (PP)^{1}	1,727	9.79	+4.10	2	+1
United Left–Assembly for Andalusia (IU–CA)	1,189	6.74	+0.36	1	±0
Democratic and Social Centre (CDS)	n/a	n/a	−7.91	0	−1
Blank ballots	145	0.82	±0.00		
Total	17,634			21	±0
Valid votes	17,634	99.71	+0.66		
Invalid votes	51	0.29	−0.66		
Votes cast / turnout	17,685	57.87	−10.83		
Abstentions	12,873	42.13	+10.83		
Registered voters	30,558				
Sources
Footnotes: ^{1} People's Party results are compared to People's Alliance totals in the 1987 election.

=== Vélez-Málaga ===
Population: 54,234

← Summary of the 26 May 1991 City Council of Vélez-Málaga election results →
Parties and alliances	Popular vote			Seats	
Parties and alliances	Votes	%	±pp	Total	+/−
Spanish Socialist Workers' Party of Andalusia (PSOE–A)	5,111	22.14	−12.54	6	−3
Pro-Torre del Mar Municipality Independent Group (GIPMTM)	4,442	19.24	+4.51	5	+1
La Axarquía Progress (PAX)	3,657	15.84	New	4	+4
Independent Solution (SI)	2,422	10.49	New	3	+3
Andalusian Party (PA)	2,372	10.28	−0.01	3	+1
People's Party (PP)^{1}	2,124	9.20	−12.78	2	−4
United Left–Assembly for Andalusia (IU–CA)	1,893	8.20	−2.81	2	−1
White Group Party (PGB)	453	1.96	New	0	±0
The Greens of Andalusia (LVA)	213	0.92	New	0	±0
Democratic and Social Centre (CDS)	212	0.92	−5.27	0	−1
Spanish Phalanx of the CNSO (FE–JONS)	77	0.33	−0.20	0	±0
Blank ballots	107	0.46	+0.04		
Total	23,083			25	±0
Valid votes	23,083	99.51	+0.21		
Invalid votes	113	0.49	−0.21		
Votes cast / turnout	23,196	64.83	−2.00		
Abstentions	12,581	35.17	+2.00		
Registered voters	35,777				
Sources
Footnotes: ^{1} People's Party results are compared to the combined totals of People's Alliance and People's Democratic Party in the 1987 election.
