= Andalusian Left =

Andalusian Left Izquierda Andaluza
- Founded: 1998
- Ideology: Andalusian nationalism Socialism; Ecologism
- Union affiliation: Andalusian Workers' Union (SAT)
- Colors: Red; Green; White

Andalusian Left (in Spanish: Izquierda Andaluza; IA) is an Andalusian nationalist and socialist political party in Andalusia. The party is currently inactive.

== History ==
IA emerged in 1998 as a split of the United Left, from a current of opinion within the coalition called Andalusian Left Collective. IA participated in several electoral processes (like the general and regional elections of 2000), sometimes in coalitions (with the Greens of Andalusia in the elections to the European Parliament of 1999 in the coalition Greens - The Peoples' Left) or with the Socialist Party of Andalusia. In 2008 IA joined the Andalusian Coalition.

== Elections ==
- 2000 Andalusian parliamentary election: 10,232 votes (0.26%)
