= Independent Group of Benalmádena =

Political party in Benalmádena, Spain

Independent Group of Benalmádena (Spanish: Grupo Independiente de Benalmádena; GIB) is an inactive political party in the municipality of Benalmádena, Spain.

The party was founded in 1995 by Enrique Bolín after he left the People's Party (PP), on the model with which Jesús Gil had formed a government in Marbella in 1991. The party governed Benalmádena until 2007. In the 1999 Spanish local elections GIB won 5,251 votes (40.93%) and eleven seats in the municipal council. It was joined by the sole Independent Liberal Group (GIL) councillor of the municipality, José Luis Fuentes.

In 2000 Bolín, was investigated by a Torremolinos court for an alleged crime of illegal financing of the party.

In the 2003 municipal elections GIB got 5,995 votes (41.63%) and won 10 seats in the municipal council, forming a majority government together with the PP.
