= Liberal Independent Group =

Liberal Independent Group Grupo Independiente Liberal
- Leader: Jesús Gil
- Founder: Jesús Gil
- Founded: 1991
- Dissolved: 2007
- Headquarters: Marbella, Spain
- Ideology: Right-wing populism Conservatism; Neoliberalism; Economic ultraliberalism
- Political position: Right-wing to far-right

The Liberal Independent Group (Spanish: Grupo Independiente Liberal, GIL) was a right-wing Spanish political party, founded in 1991 by the businessman Jesús Gil y Gil who was mayor of Marbella in the Costa del Sol, and convicted of corruption. "GIL", the acronym of the party's name in Spanish, is a play on words, as it references the surname of the party's founder, Jesús Gil.

GIL governed Marbella beginning in 1991 on a platform of fighting petty crime and carrying out public ornamental works in the city. At the same time, Marbella was known as a refuge for British, Italian and Russian crime lords. After Gil was removed by a Spanish tribunal on charges of political corruption, Julián Muñoz, (also known for his romance with singer Isabel Pantoja), assumed the mayoralty of the city. He was later ousted by GIL members supporting Marisol Yagüe Reyes with the help of a turncoat Spanish Socialist Workers' Party councillor who had been a vocal critic of corruption. In March 2006, Yagüe and most of her administration were brought to trial on charges of corruption concerning their management of urban development and planning permissions in Marbella. In April 2006, the Spanish government initiated procedures to forcibly dissolve the council, an unprecedented movement in the history of recent Spanish democracy. GIL also established a strong presence in Estepona, Ceuta and Melilla.

Gilismo ("gilism") has been identified as an italianized populism and as example of the berlusconization of Spanish politics, and along the political experiences of José María Ruiz Mateos and Mario Conde, as an example of protestary populism in Spain.

== See also ==
- Category:Liberal Independent Group politicians
- Operation Malaya

== Bibliography ==
- Casals Meseguer, Xavier (2003). Ultrapatriotas. Extrema derecha y nacionalismo de la guerra fría a la era de la globalización. Barcelona: Crítica. ISBN 84-8432-430-3.
- Sanders, Karen B.; Berganza, Rosa; Miguel, Roberto de (2017). "Spain: Populism from the Far Right to the Emergence of Podemos". In Toril Aalberg; Frank Esser; Carsten Reinemann; Jesper Strömbäck; Claes H. de Vreese (eds.). Populist Political Communication in Europe. New York and London: Routledge. pp. 249–260. ISBN 978-1-138-65480-8.
