= Opinion polling for the 2015 Spanish local elections (Andalusia) =

In the run up to the 2015 Spanish local elections, various organisations carried out opinion polling to gauge voting intention in local entities in Spain. Results of such polls for municipalities in Andalusia are displayed in this article. The date range for these opinion polls is from the previous local elections, held on 22 May 2011, to the day the next elections were held, on 24 May 2015.

Polls are listed in reverse chronological order, showing the most recent first and using the dates when the survey fieldwork was done, as opposed to the date of publication. Where the fieldwork dates are unknown, the date of publication is given instead. The highest percentage figure in each polling survey is displayed with its background shaded in the leading party's colour. If a tie ensues, this is applied to the figures with the highest percentages. The "Lead" columns on the right shows the percentage-point difference between the parties with the highest percentages in a given poll.

== Municipalities ==
=== Algeciras ===
Polling firm/Commissioner	Fieldwork date	Sample size	Turnout	PP	PSOE–A	IULV	PA	UPyD	ASSP	C's	Lead
2015 municipal election	24 May 2015	—N/a	45.8	43.9; 14	21.6; 6	7.2; 2	3.4; 0	1.1; 0	11.9; 3	7.4; 2	22.3
Tresochenta/La Verdad	22 Apr–8 May 2015	600	61.7	41.0; 13/14	17.0; 5	6.4; 1/2	5.7; 1	–	11.8; 3	9.5; 2/3	24.0
Insobel/8TV	30 Apr 2015	600	?	49.1; 15/16	15.3; 4/5	6.0; 1/2	5.8; 1	–	10.7; 3	9.2; 2/3	33.8
Commentia/Grupo Joly	20–22 Apr 2015	300	52	41.6; 13	23.9; 7	4.7; 0	2.2; 0	–	12.6; 3/4	12.6; 3/4	17.7
Insobel/8TV	10–16 Dec 2014	600	?	49.5; 15	19.3; 5/6	8.5; 2	6.4; 1/2	2.0; 0	10.6; 3	–	30.2
Insobel/8TV	26–30 May 2014	600	?	50.2; 15/16	16.9; 5/6	8.8; 2/3	7.3; 2	3.8; 0	8.6; 2/3	–	33.3
2011 municipal election	22 May 2011	—N/a	50.4	51.8; 16	18.7; 6	12.2; 3	7.7; 2	3.1; 0	–	–	33.1

=== Almería ===
Color key:

Exit poll

Polling firm/Commissioner	Fieldwork date	Sample size	Turnout	PP	PSOE–A	IULV	UPyD	GASSP	C's	Ahora	Lead
2015 municipal election	24 May 2015	—N/a	52.8	40.4; 13	27.0; 9	7.0; 2	2.2; 0	3.5; 0	10.0; 3	3.7; 0	13.4
TNS Demoscopia/RTVE–FORTA	24 May 2015	?	?	38.1; 12/14	? 8/9	8.5; 2/3	–	5.8; 1	11.2; 2/3	–	?
Deimos/La Voz de Almería	17 May 2015	?	?	41.2; 13/14	26.1; 7/8	5.7; 0/1	–	6.6; 0/1	16.2; 4/5	5.7; 0/1	15.1
Commentia/Grupo Joly	22–24 Apr 2015	400	?	46.4; 14	22.3; 6/7	5.4; 0/1	–	12.5; 3	10.2; 3	–	24.1
2011 municipal election	22 May 2011	—N/a	56.6	58.5; 18	22.8; 7	8.6; 2	3.7; 0	–	–	–	35.7

=== Andújar ===
Polling firm/Commissioner	Fieldwork date	Sample size	Turnout	PP	PSOE–A	IULV	PA	C's	Lead
2015 municipal election	24 May 2015	—N/a	63.0	37.0; 9	43.7; 10	6.7; 1	6.3; 1	4.9; 0	6.7
Progressive Andújar Forum	Jan–Feb 2014	137	?	34.0; 8	39.0; 9	19.0; 4	3.0; 0	–	5.0
2011 municipal election	22 May 2011	—N/a	68.3	48.5; 11	36.3; 8	7.9; 1	5.3; 1	–	12.2

=== Arcos de la Frontera ===
Polling firm/Commissioner	Fieldwork date	Sample size	Turnout	PP	AiPro	PSOE–A	Ven–T	IULV	AeC	Lead
2015 municipal election	24 May 2015	—N/a	65.4	26.0; 6	17.0; 4	39.3; 10	4.8; 0	4.0; 0	6.8; 1	13.3
Insobel/8TV	24–31 Mar 2015	450	66.0	35.5; 8/9	15.1; 3/4	30.7; 7/8	4.2; 0/1	3.9; 0	5.0; 1	4.8
Insobel/8TV	2–9 Dec 2014	450	66.9	34.5; 8	18.9; 4/5	28.4; 7	3.8; 0	–	7.9; 1/2	6.1
Insobel/8TV	19–22 May 2014	450	?	32.5; 7/8	26.6; 6/7	24.7; 6	5.1; 0/1	4.1; 0	–	5.9
2011 municipal election	22 May 2011	—N/a	68.4	30.8; 7	27.5; 7	27.3; 7	5.0; 0	3.5; 0	–	3.3

=== Cádiz ===
Color key:

Exit poll

Polling firm/Commissioner	Fieldwork date	Sample size	Turnout	PP	PSOE–A	IULV	UPyD	PA	Ganar Cádiz	PCSSP	C's	Lead
2015 municipal election	24 May 2015	—N/a	65.3	33.8; 10	17.3; 5	(Note: Within Ganar Cádiz.)	1.1; 0	1.4; 0	8.4; 2	27.9; 8	7.2; 2	5.9
TNS Demoscopia/RTVE–FORTA	24 May 2015	?	?	29.4; 8/9	17.8; 5/6		–	–	9.7; 2/3	28.3; 8/9	9.1; 2/3	1.1
Insobel/8TV	5–8 May 2015	600	?	34.6; 10/11	18.9; 5/6		–	–	5.4; 1	21.1; 6	13.5; 4	13.5
Commentia/Grupo Joly	16–29 Apr 2015	400	60	36.2; 11	16.9; 5		2.3; 0	–	5.0; 0	21.6; 7	15.0; 4	14.6
IMC/La Voz	27–28 Apr 2015	400	?	43.7; 13/14	16.1; 4/6		–	–	5.3; 0/2	15.0; 3/5	15.3; 4/6	27.6
Insobel/8TV	29 Oct–6 Nov 2014	600	?	51.3; 16	22.9; 7	9.9; 3	3.8; 0	–	5.8; 1	–	–	28.4
Insobel/8TV	9 May 2014	?	?	48.6; 15	23.9; 7	12.5; 4	5.5; 1	–	–	–	–	24.7
2011 municipal election	22 May 2011	—N/a	56.8	56.3; 17	22.2; 7	9.5; 3	3.6; 0	2.0; 0	–	–	–	34.1

=== Carmona ===
Polling firm/Commissioner	Fieldwork date	Sample size	Turnout	PP	IULV	PSOE–A	UPC	CCD	Participa	Lead
2015 municipal election	24 May 2015	—N/a	57.6	42.1; 10	20.7; 5	22.7; 5	4.5; 0	3.6; 0	5.0; 1	19.4
RS22/El Día de Carmona	29 Apr–3 May 2015	300	62	44.6; 10/11	19.0; 4/5	21.6; 5	4.5; 0/1	3.5; 0	5.4; 1	23.0
2011 municipal election	22 May 2011	—N/a	63.2	38.3; 9	33.0; 7	17.8; 4	6.7; 1	2.0; 0	–	5.3

=== Chiclana de la Frontera ===
Polling firm/Commissioner	Fieldwork date	Sample size	Turnout	PP	PSOE–A	PVRE	IULV	UPyD	PA	PChSSP	GCH	Lead
2015 municipal election	24 May 2015	—N/a	48.7	26.6; 8	36.8; 11	1.9; 0	11.1; 3	–	1.7; 0	9.9; 2	5.8; 1	10.2
Insobel/8TV	27–30 Apr 2015	600	63.1	28.0; 8	36.2; 10/11	1.0; 0	9.5; 2/3	–	–	15.1; 4	3.6; 0/1	8.2
Insobel/8TV	25 Nov–1 Dec 2014	600	62	31.2; 9	32.7; 9/10	3.7; 0	6.5; 1/2	5.1; 0/1	–	14.1; 4	–	1.5
Insobel/8TV	22–26 Apr 2014	600	53.3	32.9; 10	34.2; 10/11	4.4; 0/1	12.4; 4	–	3.0; 0	–	–	1.3
2011 municipal election	22 May 2011	—N/a	52.4	37.3; 11	32.9; 10	9.3; 2	7.6; 2	2.8; 0	1.9; 0	–	–	4.4

=== Córdoba ===
Color key:

Exit poll

Polling firm/Commissioner	Fieldwork date	Sample size	Turnout	PP	UCOR	IULV	PSOE–A	UPyD	PA	GC	C's	Lead
2015 municipal election	24 May 2015	—N/a	57.1	34.7; 11	5.7; 1	12.0; 4	20.6; 7	1.0; 0	0.5; 0	12.6; 4	8.6; 2	14.1
TNS Demoscopia/RTVE–FORTA	24 May 2015	?	?	? 11/13	? 0/1	? 3/4	? 7/8	–	–	? 4/5	? 2/3	?
Enquest/Diario Córdoba	28–30 Apr 2015	?	?	32.3; 10/12	2.3; 0	16.0; 5	20.9; 6/7	1.6; 0	0.5; 0	14.0; 4/5	11.3; 3/4	11.4
Commentia/Grupo Joly	16–29 Apr 2015	400	60	36.5; 12	–	14.2; 4	17.2; 5	–	–	13.6; 4	14.4; 4	19.3
IMC	6–9 Apr 2015	?	?	41.1; 14/15	3.2; 0/1	9.4; 3	18.5; 6	–	–	11.2; 3	10.6; 3	22.6
2011 municipal election	22 May 2011	—N/a	63.5	48.8; 16	15.2; 5	14.8; 4	12.0; 4	1.8; 0	0.9; 0	–	–	33.6

=== El Ejido ===
Polling firm/Commissioner	Fieldwork date	Sample size	Turnout	PP	PSOE–A	PdeAL	UPyD	IULV	C's	Lead
2015 municipal election	24 May 2015	—N/a	45.3	48.0; 14	24.9; 7	3.8; 0	6.2; 1	6.6; 2	5.4; 1	23.1
Deimos/La Voz de Almería	16 May 2015	600	?	54.6; 15/16	23.6; 6/7	1.3; 0	2.0; 0	1.0; 0	11.1; 3	31.0
2011 municipal election	22 May 2011	—N/a	60.6	49.1; 13	16.1; 4	15.3; 4	9.2; 2	8.1; 2	–	33.0

=== El Puerto de Santa María ===
Polling firm/Commissioner	Fieldwork date	Sample size	Turnout	PP	PA	PSOE–A	IULV	IP	UPyD	C's	L	Qp	Lead
2015 municipal election	24 May 2015	—N/a	50.7	31.7; 9	6.4; 1	20.3; 6	10.4; 3	(Note: Within C's.)	2.1; 0	9.5; 2	15.2; 4	2.8; 0	11.4
Commentia/Grupo Joly	20–22 Apr 2015	300	?	30.1; 9	3.8; 0	20.0; 5/6	8.6; 2		–	20.5; 5/6	11.0; 3	–	9.6
Noticias Locales	26 Jan 2015	736	?	? 10/11	? 3	? 3/4	? 2/3		? 0	? 1	? 4/5	? 0	?
Insobel/8TV	22–29 Oct 2014	600	?	30.5; 9	15.4; 4/5	12.2; 4	14.4; 4		4.6; 0/1	5.8; 1	5.0; 0/1	6.2; 1	15.1
Celeste-Tel/Grupo Viva	8 Apr 2014	560	50.3	30.7; 8	17.1; 4/5	13.7; 3/4	17.2; 5	15.1; 4	–	–	–	–	13.5
Celeste-Tel/8TV	9–16 Mar 2014	560	49.4	30.4; 8	17.6; 4	14.1; 4	18.2; 5	13.7; 3	5.0; 1	–	–	–	12.2
2011 municipal election	22 May 2011	—N/a	53.4	38.0; 11	17.2; 4	13.8; 4	13.1; 3	11.4; 3	3.2; 0	–	–	–	20.8

=== Granada ===
Color key:

Exit poll

Polling firm/Commissioner	Fieldwork date	Sample size	Turnout	PP	PSOE–A	IULV	UPyD	LV	VG	C's	Lead
2015 municipal election	24 May 2015	—N/a	59.8	35.6; 11	25.9; 8	5.9; 1	2.1; 0	–	12.8; 3	14.1; 4	9.7
TNS Demoscopia/RTVE–FORTA	24 May 2015	?	?	36.4; 10/12	25.4; 7/8	5.0; 0/1	–	–	13.9; 3/4	13.3; 3/4	11.0
Commentia/Grupo Joly	22–24 Apr 2015	400	63	41.0; 12	29.5; 8	6.2; 1	–	–	11.1; 3	10.1; 3	11.5
PSOE	Nov 2013	?	?	39.5	36.5	8.2	6.8	3.2	–	–	3.0
2011 municipal election	22 May 2011	—N/a	63.1	51.9; 16	27.2; 8	7.8; 2	5.3; 1	2.6; 0	–	–	24.7

=== Huelva ===
Color key:

Exit poll

Polling firm/Commissioner	Fieldwork date	Sample size	Turnout	PP	PSOE–A	IULV	MRH	UPyD	PH	C's	Lead
2015 municipal election	24 May 2015	—N/a	52.1	26.7; 8	35.3; 11	10.0; 3	6.4; 1	1.0; 0	5.3; 1	10.1; 3	8.6
TNS Demoscopia/RTVE–FORTA	24 May 2015	?	?	23.0; 6/7	33.5; 9/11	12.0; 4/5	–	–	–	9.0; 2/3	10.5
Commentia/Grupo Joly	28–29 Apr 2015	400	58	33.3; 10	32.7; 9	8.8; 2	–	–	10.6; 3	10.4; 3	0.6
Dialoga Consultores/PP	14–17 Apr 2015	1,002	?	37.6; 13/14	28.7; 9/10	7.2; 1/2	3.5; 0/1	4.2; 0/1	8.5; 1/2	5.7; 1/2	8.9
2011 municipal election	22 May 2011	—N/a	55.7	45.3; 14	30.5; 9	10.1; 3	5.4; 1	1.9; 0	–	–	14.8

=== Jaén ===
Color key:

Exit poll

Polling firm/Commissioner	Fieldwork date	Sample size	Turnout	PP	PSOE–A	IULV	UPyD	PA	JeC	C's	Lead
2015 municipal election	24 May 2015	—N/a	60.9	38.4; 12	29.5; 9	4.1; 0	1.3; 0	0.9; 0	10.3; 3	11.3; 3	8.9
TNS Demoscopia/RTVE–FORTA	24 May 2015	?	?	36.0; 10/12	30.0; 8/9	3.5; 0	–	–	11.0; 2/3	12.0; 3/4	6.0
AEMMO/Diario Jaén	12 Jul 2014	1,000	?	47.8; 14/15	26.0; 8	5.7; 1	6.1; 1	1.4; 0	9.5; 2/3	–	21.8
2011 municipal election	22 May 2011	—N/a	69.2	51.8; 14	35.1; 9	5.9; 3	3.2; 0	1.3; 0	–	–	16.7

=== Jerez de la Frontera ===
Polling firm/Commissioner	Fieldwork date	Sample size	Turnout	PP	PSOE–A	FCJ	IULV	PA	UPyD	GJ	C's	Lead
2015 municipal election	24 May 2015	—N/a	54.7	34.1; 11	24.2; 7	7.3; 2	3.3; 0	2.2; 0	1.3; 0	16.2; 5	8.9; 2	9.9
Commentia/Grupo Joly	25–27 Apr 2015	400	60	33.4; 10	29.6; 8	–	5.4; 1	–	–	18.0; 5	11.3; 3	3.8
Celeste-Tel/Grupo Viva	17–24 Sep 2014	600	56.7	46.4; 14/15	13.4; 4	12.3; 3/4	8.3; 2	2.7; 0	2.4; 0	11.0; 3	–	33.0
Insobel/8TV	5–10 May 2014	600	?	49.9; 15/16	12.7; 4	8.5; 3	13.4; 4	4.5; 0	5.3; 0/1	–	–	36.5
Celeste-Tel/Grupo Viva	28 Apr–8 May 2014	600	57.1	44.8; 14	16.0; 5	13.6; 4	13.4; 4	3.8; 0	4.8; 0	–	–	28.8
2011 municipal election	22 May 2011	—N/a	60.6	46.6; 15	14.6; 5	14.0; 4	11.5; 3	4.0; 0	3.1; 0	–	–	32.0

=== La Línea de la Concepción ===
Polling firm/Commissioner	Fieldwork date	Sample size	Turnout	PP	PSOE–A	IULV	PA	UPyD	Podemos	G		Lead
2015 municipal election	24 May 2015	—N/a	45.4	20.4; 5	34.1; 9	6.4; 1	5.2; 1	1.7; 0	(Note: Within LL100.)		31.0; 9	3.1
Tresochenta/La Verdad	22 Apr–8 May 2015	450	63.2	29.2; 8	38.5; 11	7.0; 1/2	5.4; 1	1.3; 0			16.4; 4	9.3
Insobel/8TV	21–25 Apr 2015	450	?	31.2; 8/9	36.0; 10/11	6.8; 1/2	5.1; 0/1	1.3; 0			16.0; 4/5	4.8
Insobel/8TV	12–17 Nov 2014	450	?	26.7; 7/8	36.8; 10/11	7.7; 2	6.6; 2	5.2; 1	7.5; 2	4.0; 0	–	10.1
Insobel/8TV	2–6 Jun 2014	450	?	27.8; 7	36.9; 10	7.2; 2	9.8; 3	5.3; 1	7.6; 2	–	–	9.1
2011 municipal election	22 May 2011	—N/a	52.6	40.9; 11	35.1; 10	8.8; 2	8.6; 2	–	–	–	–	5.8

=== Los Barrios ===
Polling firm/Commissioner	Fieldwork date	Sample size	Turnout	PA	PP	PSOE–A	PIBA	IULV	LBSSP	Lead
2015 municipal election	24 May 2015	—N/a	59.9	38.5; 10	13.9; 3	23.4; 6	7.5; 1	2.5; 0	5.4; 1	15.1
Celeste-Tel/Grupo Viva	Mar 2014	700	57.6	41.2; 9	19.6; 4	18.1; 4	13.1; 3	8.1; 1	–	21.6
2011 municipal election	22 May 2011	—N/a	67.0	45.3; 10	22.3; 5	16.8; 4	10.3; 2	3.3; 0	–	23.0

=== Linares ===
Polling firm/Commissioner	Fieldwork date	Sample size	Turnout	PSOE–A	PP	IULV	UPyD	PA	Podemos	C's	CILUS	Lead
2015 municipal election	24 May 2015	—N/a	54.8	36.1; 10	28.5; 8	14.6; 4	1.0; 0	1.9; 0	–	9.4; 2	5.9; 1	7.6
NC Report	25 Jul 2014	?	58.2	33.7; 9/10	34.2; 9/10	6.8; 1/2	6.7; 1/2	3.7; 0	11.2; 3	–	–	0.5
2011 municipal election	22 May 2011	—N/a	60.1	40.8; 11	40.0; 11	11.0; 3	4.1; 0	1.8; 0	–	–	–	0.8

=== Málaga ===
Color key:

Exit poll

Polling firm/Commissioner	Fieldwork date	Sample size	Turnout	PP	PSOE–A	IULV	UPyD	Málaga Ahora	C's	Lead
2015 municipal election	24 May 2015	—N/a	54.4	36.6; 13	26.2; 9	7.4; 2	1.2; 0	13.3; 4	10.4; 3	10.4
TNS Demoscopia/RTVE–FORTA	24 May 2015	?	?	? 11/13	? 8/9	? 2/3	–	13.6; 4/5	? 3/4	?
Celeste-Tel/La Opinión de Málaga	10 May 2015	800	55.6	45.2; 15	22.6; 8	10.3; 3	1.8; 0	8.3; 2	10.3; 3	22.6
Sigma Dos/Diario Sur	28 Apr–4 May 2015	500	?	44.4; 15/16	19.4; 6	8.0; 2	–	11.4; 3/4	13.2; 4	25.0
Commentia/Grupo Joly	16–29 Apr 2015	400	?	41.0; 14	22.6; 7	6.9; 2	–	14.2; 4	12.3; 4	18.4
Ganemos Málaga	17 Jan 2015	?	?	? 11	? 6	? 1	? 1	? 12	–	?
Llorente & Cuenca	31 Oct 2014	?	?	? 13/15	? 8/9	? 3/4	? 1	? 6/7	–	?
PSOE	Jun 2014	800	?	? 15/16	? 8/9	? 3/4	–	? 3/4	–	?
Metroscopia/PP	4–8 Apr 2014	1,200	?	? 16	? 10	? 4	? 1	–	–	?
2011 municipal election	22 May 2011	—N/a	55.6	53.5; 19	24.8; 9	11.0; 3	3.5; 0	–	–	28.7

=== Marbella ===
Polling firm/Commissioner	Fieldwork date	Sample size	Turnout	PP	PSOE–A	OSP	IULV	CSSP	CM	Lead
2015 municipal election	24 May 2015	—N/a	53.6	41.0; 13	26.3; 8	9.2; 2	6.8; 2	8.2; 2	2.0; 0	14.7
Sigma Dos/Diario Sur	4–5 May 2015	500	?	49.2; 16/17	21.8; 7	5.8; 1/2	4.6; 0	8.5; 2	4.2; 0	27.4
GESPA/PP	23 Jun–2 Jul 2014	600	60	48.6; 15	22.5; 6/7	10.1; 3	9.9; 2/3	–	–	26.1
2011 municipal election	22 May 2011	—N/a	54.9	50.1; 15	25.2; 7	9.8; 3	7.7; 2	–	–	24.9

=== Mijas ===
Polling firm/Commissioner	Fieldwork date	Sample size	Turnout	PP	PSOE–A	GIM	AM	PA	IULV	UPyD	CSSP	C's	Lead
2015 municipal election	24 May 2015	—N/a	54.5	36.4; 11	26.2; 7	–	3.7; 0	2.2; 0	3.7; 0	2.4; 0	7.3; 2	17.1; 5	10.2
Mijas Información	1–16 Oct 2014	800	?	32.8; 10	31.3; 9	–	6.0; 1	3.0; 0	5.6; 1	9.5; 3	5.3; 1	–	1.5
2011 municipal election	22 May 2011	—N/a	59.0	50.0; 15	25.1; 7	6.8; 2	5.3; 1	4.3; 0	3.9; 0	3.0; 0	–	–	24.9

=== Roquetas de Mar ===
Polling firm/Commissioner	Fieldwork date	Sample size	Turnout	PP	PSOE–A	IULV	INDAPA	C's	TD	Lead
2015 municipal election	24 May 2015	—N/a	50.0	40.9; 12	21.1; 6	12.8; 3	4.6; 0	12.2; 3	5.8; 1	19.8
Deimos/La Voz de Almería	16 May 2015	?	?	45.5; 13	22.3; 6	7.0; 2	3.1; 0	12.8; 3	5.7; 1	23.2
2011 municipal election	22 May 2011	—N/a	54.6	58.9; 16	18.2; 5	11.2; 3	5.6; 1	–	–	40.7

=== San Fernando ===
Polling firm/Commissioner	Fieldwork date	Sample size	Turnout	PP	PSOE–A	PA	CxSF	IULV	UPyD	SSPSF	C's	Lead
2015 municipal election	24 May 2015	—N/a	52.5	23.2; 7	29.8; 8	12.4; 3	–	4.7; 0	1.6; 0	14.4; 4	10.7; 3	6.6
Insobel/8TV	28 Apr–4 May 2015	600	?	20.4; 5/6	25.3; 7	10.5; 2/3	–	6.2; 1	2.0; 0	17.1; 4/5	15.8; 4	4.9
Commentia/Grupo Joly	16–29 Apr 2015	300	?	25.2; 7	28.7; 8	7.2; 2	–	5.1; 1	–	13.5; 3	16.1; 4	3.5
Aurea Project/Grupo Viva	16–23 Apr 2015	400	55.8	34.5; 11	19.0; 6	6.1; 1	–	4.8; 0	–	15.6; 4	11.0; 3	15.5
Insobel/8TV	19–24 Nov 2014	600	?	26.1; 7/8	27.5; 8	5.1; 1	6.3; 1/2	8.1; 2	6.1; 1/2	16.6; 4/5	–	1.4
Aurea Project/Grupo Viva	3–22 Oct 2014	439	?	35.2; 11/12	21.7; 7	4.9; 0/1	<5.0; 0	<5.0; 0	<5.0; 0	18.5; 6	–	13.5
Insobel/8TV	5–10 May 2014	600	?	33.9; 9	28.1; 8	9.2; 2	11.2; 3	8.5; 2	5.9; 1	–	–	5.8
2011 municipal election	22 May 2011	—N/a	53.6	35.0; 10	34.0; 9	11.4; 3	7.3; 2	5.3; 1	4.5; 0	–	–	1.0

=== Utrera ===
Polling firm/Commissioner	Fieldwork date	Sample size	Turnout	PSOE–A	PA	PP	IULV	UPyD	Podemos	Lead
2015 municipal election	24 May 2015	—N/a	57.0	43.6; 12	31.8; 9	7.3; 2	7.8; 2	4.3; 0	–	11.8
Diálogo Demoscopia	1–5 Sep 2014	600	?	43.4; 13/14	20.1; 5/6	14.8; 3/4	5.5; 0/1	6.1; 1/2	5.9; 0/1	23.3
2011 municipal election	22 May 2011	—N/a	60.8	34.9; 10	33.2; 9	15.4; 4	6.7; 1	5.4; 1	–	1.7
