= 2015 Spanish local elections in Andalusia =

This article presents the results breakdown of the local elections held in Andalusia on 24 May 2015. The following tables show detailed results in the autonomous community's most populous municipalities, sorted alphabetically.

== City control ==
The following table lists party control in the most populous municipalities, including provincial capitals (shown in bold). Gains for a party are displayed with the cell's background shaded in that party's colour.

Municipality	Population	Previous control	New control
Alcalá de Guadaíra	74,404	Spanish Socialist Workers' Party of Andalusia (PSOE–A)	Spanish Socialist Workers' Party of Andalusia (PSOE–A)
Algeciras	117,974	People's Party (PP)	People's Party (PP)
**Almería**	193,351	People's Party (PP)	People's Party (PP)
Antequera	41,430	People's Party (PP)	People's Party (PP)
Benalmádena	66,939	People's Party (PP)	Spanish Socialist Workers' Party of Andalusia (PSOE–A)
**Cádiz**	121,739	People's Party (PP)	For Cádiz Yes We Can (PCSSP)
Chiclana de la Frontera	82,298	People's Party (PP)	Spanish Socialist Workers' Party of Andalusia (PSOE–A)
**Córdoba**	328,041	People's Party (PP)	Spanish Socialist Workers' Party of Andalusia (PSOE–A)
Dos Hermanas	130,369	Spanish Socialist Workers' Party of Andalusia (PSOE–A)	Spanish Socialist Workers' Party of Andalusia (PSOE–A)
Écija	40,634	People's Party (PP)	Spanish Socialist Workers' Party of Andalusia (PSOE–A)
El Ejido	84,144	People's Party (PP)	People's Party (PP)
El Puerto de Santa María	88,700	People's Party (PP)	Spanish Socialist Workers' Party of Andalusia (PSOE–A)
Fuengirola	75,856	People's Party (PP)	People's Party (PP)
**Granada**	237,540	People's Party (PP)	People's Party (PP) (PSOE–A in 2016)
**Huelva**	147,212	People's Party (PP)	Spanish Socialist Workers' Party of Andalusia (PSOE–A)
**Jaén**	115,837	People's Party (PP)	People's Party (PP)
Jerez de la Frontera	212,226	People's Party (PP)	Spanish Socialist Workers' Party of Andalusia (PSOE–A)
La Línea de la Concepción	63,132	Spanish Socialist Workers' Party of Andalusia (PSOE–A)	La Línea 100x100 (LL100x100)
Linares	60,290	Spanish Socialist Workers' Party of Andalusia (PSOE–A)	Spanish Socialist Workers' Party of Andalusia (PSOE–A)
**Málaga**	566,913	People's Party (PP)	People's Party (PP)
Marbella	138,679	People's Party (PP)	Spanish Socialist Workers' Party of Andalusia (PSOE–A) (PP in 2017)
Mijas	77,521	People's Party (PP)	Citizens–Party of the Citizenry (C's)
Morón de la Frontera	28,241	Spanish Socialist Workers' Party of Andalusia (PSOE–A)	Spanish Socialist Workers' Party of Andalusia (PSOE–A)
Motril	60,870	People's Party (PP)	Spanish Socialist Workers' Party of Andalusia (PSOE–A)
Ronda	35,059	People's Party (PP)	People's Party (PP) (PSOE–A in 2016)
Roquetas de Mar	91,682	People's Party (PP)	People's Party (PP)
San Fernando	96,335	People's Party (PP)	Spanish Socialist Workers' Party of Andalusia (PSOE–A)
Sanlúcar de Barrameda	67,385	Spanish Socialist Workers' Party of Andalusia (PSOE–A)	Spanish Socialist Workers' Party of Andalusia (PSOE–A)
**Seville**	696,676	People's Party (PP)	Spanish Socialist Workers' Party of Andalusia (PSOE–A)
Utrera	52,437	Andalusian Party (PA)	Spanish Socialist Workers' Party of Andalusia (PSOE–A)
Vélez-Málaga	77,808	People's Party (PP)	Spanish Socialist Workers' Party of Andalusia (PSOE–A)

== Municipalities ==
=== Alcalá de Guadaíra ===
Population: 74,404

← Summary of the 24 May 2015 City Council of Alcalá de Guadaíra election results →
Parties and alliances	Popular vote			Seats	
Parties and alliances	Votes	%	±pp	Total	+/−
Spanish Socialist Workers' Party of Andalusia (PSOE–A)	9,884	31.69	−11.54	9	−4
People's Party (PP)	5,719	18.34	−12.89	5	−4
Alcalá Can (Alcalá Puede)	4,613	14.79	New	4	+4
United Left/The Greens–Assembly and Alcalá Alternative (IULV–CA–AA)	3,646	11.69	+5.31	3	+2
Andalusian Party (PA)	3,008	9.64	+0.08	2	±0
Citizens–Party of the Citizenry (C's)	2,230	7.15	New	2	+2
Citizens of Alcalá de Guadaíra (CdAG)	598	1.92	New	0	±0
Union, Progress and Democracy (UPyD)	568	1.82	−2.08	0	±0
United for Alcalá (Republican Candidacy) (UpA)	450	1.44	New	0	±0
Blank ballots	473	1.52	−1.73		
Total	31,189			25	±0
Valid votes	31,189	98.85	+1.13		
Invalid votes	364	1.15	−1.13		
Votes cast / turnout	31,553	55.83	−0.49		
Abstentions	24,964	44.17	+0.49		
Registered voters	56,517				

=== Algeciras ===
Population: 117,974

← Summary of the 24 May 2015 City Council of Algeciras election results →
Parties and alliances	Popular vote			Seats	
Parties and alliances	Votes	%	±pp	Total	+/−
People's Party (PP)	17,675	43.88	−7.92	14	−2
Spanish Socialist Workers' Party of Andalusia (PSOE–A)	8,683	21.56	+2.87	6	±0
Algeciras Yes We Can (ASSP)	4,788	11.89	New	3	+3
Citizens–Party of the Citizenry (C's)	2,990	7.42	New	2	+2
United Left/The Greens–Assembly for Andalusia (IULV–CA)	2,913	7.23	−4.99	2	−1
Andalusian Party (PA)	1,359	3.37	−4.37	0	−2
Algeciras Citizen Action (AC–ALG)	877	2.18	New	0	±0
Union, Progress and Democracy (UPyD)	427	1.06	−2.04	0	±0
Blank ballots	564	1.40	−1.94		
Total	40,276			27	±0
Valid votes	40,276	99.32	+1.00		
Invalid votes	275	0.68	−1.00		
Votes cast / turnout	40,551	45.81	−4.56		
Abstentions	47,973	54.19	+4.56		
Registered voters	88,524				

=== Almería ===
Population: 193,351

← Summary of the 24 May 2015 City Council of Almería election results →
Parties and alliances	Popular vote			Seats	
Parties and alliances	Votes	%	±pp	Total	+/−
People's Party (PP)	29,935	40.36	−18.14	13	−5
Spanish Socialist Workers' Party of Andalusia (PSOE–A)	20,027	27.00	+4.18	9	+2
Citizens–Party of the Citizenry (C's)	7,422	10.01	New	3	+3
United Left/The Greens–Assembly–Almería for the People (IULV–CA–PG)	5,180	6.98	−1.66	2	±0
Almería Now (Ahora Almería)	2,774	3.74	New	0	±0
Let's Win Almería Yes We Can (GASSP)	2,561	3.45	New	0	±0
Union, Progress and Democracy (UPyD)	1,627	2.19	−1.49	0	±0
Equo (Equo)	1,424	1.92	New	0	±0
Animalist Party Against Mistreatment of Animals (PACMA)	977	1.32	New	0	±0
Andalusian Party (PA)	422	0.57	−0.67	0	±0
Vox (Vox)	302	0.41	New	0	±0
Union for Almería (UpAL)^{1}	192	0.26	−0.21	0	±0
Spanish Phalanx of the CNSO (FE de las JONS)	136	0.18	New	0	±0
Communist Party of the Peoples of Spain (PCPE)	122	0.16	New	0	±0
Multi-Cultural Party of Social Justice (MJS)	81	0.11	New	0	±0
Blank ballots	995	1.34	−0.99		
Total	74,177			27	±0
Valid votes	74,177	99.32	+0.68		
Invalid votes	506	0.68	−0.68		
Votes cast / turnout	74,683	52.85	−3.73		
Abstentions	66,631	47.15	+3.73		
Registered voters	141,314				
Sources
Footnotes: ^{1} Union for Almería results are compared to Almerian Neighbourhood Union totals in the 2011 election.

=== Antequera ===
Population: 41,430

← Summary of the 24 May 2015 City Council of Antequera election results →
Parties and alliances	Popular vote			Seats	
Parties and alliances	Votes	%	±pp	Total	+/−
People's Party (PP)	9,031	46.29	+1.73	11	±0
Spanish Socialist Workers' Party of Andalusia (PSOE–A)	6,737	34.53	+3.06	8	+1
United Left/The Greens–Assembly–Antequera for the People (IULV–CA–PG)	1,853	9.50	−5.96	2	−1
Antequera Yes We Can (ASSP)	954	4.89	New	0	±0
Party of the Annexes and the Neighbourhoods of Antequera (PABA)	485	2.49	−1.74	0	±0
Union, Progress and Democracy (UPyD)	159	0.81	New	0	±0
Blank ballots	291	1.49	−0.58		
Total	19,510			21	±0
Valid votes	19,510	99.01	−0.03		
Invalid votes	196	0.99	+0.03		
Votes cast / turnout	19,706	61.54	+4.76		
Abstentions	12,318	38.46	−4.76		
Registered voters	32,024				

=== Benalmádena ===
Population: 66,939

← Summary of the 24 May 2015 City Council of Benalmádena election results →
Parties and alliances	Popular vote			Seats	
Parties and alliances	Votes	%	±pp	Total	+/−
People's Party (PP)	6,162	29.65	−5.93	9	−2
Spanish Socialist Workers' Party of Andalusia (PSOE–A)	5,367	25.83	+0.94	7	±0
Citizens–Party of the Citizenry (C's)	2,161	10.40	New	3	+3
Costa del Sol Can... Tic Tac (CSSPTT)	1,747	8.41	New	2	+2
United Left/The Greens–Assembly–Benalmádena for the People (IULV–CA–PG)	1,715	8.25	−0.67	2	±0
Neighbours for Benalmádena (vpb)^{1}	1,299	6.25	−0.12	1	±0
Alternative for Benalmádena (@lternativa)	1,229	5.91	New	1	+1
Benalmádena Centre Union (UCB)	706	3.40	−11.87	0	−4
Andalusian Party (PA)	125	0.60	−0.17	0	±0
Blank ballots	271	1.30	−0.93		
Total	20,782			25	±0
Valid votes	20,782	99.15	+0.26		
Invalid votes	179	0.85	−0.26		
Votes cast / turnout	20,961	49.80	−6.67		
Abstentions	21,130	50.20	+6.67		
Registered voters	42,091				
Sources
Footnotes: ^{1} Neighbours for Benalmádena results are compared to Benalmádena Independent Liberal Organization totals in the 2011 election.

=== Cádiz ===
Population: 121,739

← Summary of the 24 May 2015 City Council of Cádiz election results →
Parties and alliances	Popular vote			Seats	
Parties and alliances	Votes	%	±pp	Total	+/−
People's Party (PP)	22,261	33.84	−22.50	10	−7
For Cádiz Yes We Can (PCSSP)	18,342	27.89	New	8	+8
Spanish Socialist Workers' Party of Andalusia (PSOE–A)	11,393	17.32	−4.90	5	−2
Winning Cádiz in Common (Ganar Cádiz)^{1}	5,528	8.40	−1.66	2	−1
Citizens–Party of the Citizenry (C's)	4,705	7.15	New	2	+2
Animalist Party Against Mistreatment of Animals (PACMA)	1,182	1.80	+0.94	0	±0
Andalusian Party (PA)	907	1.38	−0.60	0	±0
Union, Progress and Democracy (UPyD)	715	1.09	−2.54	0	±0
Vox (Vox)	187	0.28	New	0	±0
Blank ballots	557	0.85	−1.22		
Total	65,777			27	±0
Valid votes	65,777	99.39	+0.64		
Invalid votes	405	0.61	−0.64		
Votes cast / turnout	66,182	65.26	+8.42		
Abstentions	35,228	34.74	−8.42		
Registered voters	101,410				
Sources
Footnotes: ^{1} Winning Cádiz in Common results are compared to the combined totals of United Left/The Greens–Assembly for Andalusia and Citizens for Cádiz in the 2011 election.

=== Chiclana de la Frontera ===
Population: 82,298

← Summary of the 24 May 2015 City Council of Chiclana de la Frontera election results →
Parties and alliances	Popular vote			Seats	
Parties and alliances	Votes	%	±pp	Total	+/−
Spanish Socialist Workers' Party of Andalusia (PSOE–A)	11,078	36.79	+3.92	11	+1
People's Party (PP)	8,003	26.58	−10.68	8	−3
United Left/The Greens–Assembly for Andalusia (IULV–CA)	3,357	11.15	+3.54	3	+1
For Chiclana Yes We Can (PChSSP)	2,976	9.88	New	2	+2
Let's Win Chiclana (Ganemos)	1,746	5.80	New	1	+1
Defense of the Andalusian People's Interests (DIPA)	782	2.60	+1.04	0	±0
Regionalist Local Party (PVRE)	582	1.93	−7.38	0	−2
Andalusian Party (PA)	497	1.65	−0.30	0	±0
Let's Add Chiclana (Sumemos)	268	0.89	New	0	±0
Blank ballots	822	2.73	+0.15		
Total	30,111			25	±0
Valid votes	30,111	99.04	+0.47		
Invalid votes	293	0.96	−0.47		
Votes cast / turnout	30,404	48.68	−3.69		
Abstentions	32,054	51.32	+3.69		
Registered voters	62,458				

=== Córdoba ===
Population: 328,041

← Summary of the 24 May 2015 City Council of Córdoba election results →
Parties and alliances	Popular vote			Seats	
Parties and alliances	Votes	%	±pp	Total	+/−
People's Party (PP)	51,441	34.65	−14.15	11	−5
Spanish Socialist Workers' Party of Andalusia (PSOE–A)	30,543	20.58	+8.58	7	+3
Let's Win Córdoba (Ganemos Córdoba)	18,656	12.57	New	4	+4
United Left/The Greens–Assembly for Andalusia (IULV–CA)	17,821	12.01	−2.82	4	±0
Citizens–Party of the Citizenry (C's)	12,792	8.62	New	2	+2
Cordobese Union (UCOR)	8,398	5.66	−9.57	1	−4
Animalist Party Against Mistreatment of Animals (PACMA)	1,732	1.17	New	0	±0
Together, Yes We Can (Entre Tod@s)	1,591	1.07	New	0	±0
Union, Progress and Democracy (UPyD)	1,489	1.00	−0.81	0	±0
Andalusian Party (PA)	767	0.52	−0.34	0	±0
Vox (Vox)	519	0.35	New	0	±0
Blank Seats (EB)	411	0.28	New	0	±0
For a Fairer World (PUM+J)	236	0.16	−0.14	0	±0
Blank ballots	2,049	1.38	−1.15		
Total	148,445			29	±0
Valid votes	148,445	99.31	+0.47		
Invalid votes	1,032	0.69	−0.47		
Votes cast / turnout	149,477	57.07	−6.41		
Abstentions	112,422	42.93	+6.41		
Registered voters	261,899				

=== Dos Hermanas ===
Population: 130,369

← Summary of the 24 May 2015 City Council of Dos Hermanas election results →
Parties and alliances	Popular vote			Seats	
Parties and alliances	Votes	%	±pp	Total	+/−
Spanish Socialist Workers' Party of Andalusia (PSOE–A)	24,438	48.52	+1.38	15	±0
Yes We Can Dos Hermanas (SSPDH)	8,095	16.07	New	4	+4
People's Party (PP)	6,807	13.52	−16.56	4	−5
Citizens–Party of the Citizenry (C's)	4,733	9.40	New	2	+2
United Left/The Greens–Assembly for Andalusia (IULV–CA)	3,285	6.52	−5.07	2	−1
Andalusian Party (PA)	1,196	2.37	−0.75	0	±0
Union, Progress and Democracy (UPyD)	500	0.99	−2.95	0	±0
Local and Global (LyG)	307	0.61	New	0	±0
Vox (Vox)	293	0.58	New	0	±0
Blank ballots	711	1.41	−1.68		
Total	50,365			27	±0
Valid votes	50,365	98.94	+0.48		
Invalid votes	541	1.06	−0.48		
Votes cast / turnout	50,906	51.18	−4.05		
Abstentions	48,552	48.82	+4.05		
Registered voters	99,458				

=== Écija ===
Population: 40,634

← Summary of the 24 May 2015 City Council of Écija election results →
Parties and alliances	Popular vote			Seats	
Parties and alliances	Votes	%	±pp	Total	+/−
Spanish Socialist Workers' Party of Andalusia (PSOE–A)	6,323	33.98	+1.52	8	±0
People's Party (PP)	5,307	28.52	−7.71	7	−2
Andalusian Party (PA)	1,890	10.16	−3.45	2	−1
Écija Can (Écija Puede)	1,622	8.72	New	2	+2
United Left/The Greens–Assembly for Andalusia (IULV–CA)	1,514	8.14	+2.26	1	±0
Ecijan Force (FuE)	1,012	5.44	+1.14	1	+1
Independent Ecijan Socialist Party (PSEI)	589	3.17	−1.29	0	±0
Blank ballots	349	1.88	−0.09		
Total	18,606			21	±0
Valid votes	18,606	98.53	−0.62		
Invalid votes	277	1.47	+0.62		
Votes cast / turnout	21,325	59.57	−8.29		
Abstentions	12,814	40.43	+8.29		
Registered voters	31,697				

=== El Ejido ===
Population: 84,144

← Summary of the 24 May 2015 City Council of El Ejido election results →
Parties and alliances	Popular vote			Seats	
Parties and alliances	Votes	%	±pp	Total	+/−
People's Party (PP)	10,063	47.96	−1.10	14	+1
Spanish Socialist Workers' Party of Andalusia (PSOE–A)	5,220	24.88	+8.81	7	+3
United Left/The Greens–Assembly–El Ejido for the People (IULV–CA–PG)	1,376	6.56	−1.54	2	±0
Union, Progress and Democracy (UPyD)	1,311	6.25	−2.94	1	−1
Citizens–Party of the Citizenry (C's)	1,131	5.39	New	1	+1
Party of Almería (PdeAL)	794	3.78	−11.48	0	−4
Almería Now (Ahora Almería)	348	1.66	New	0	±0
Recovering El Ejido (Recuperemos)	227	1.08	New	0	±0
Vox (Vox)	88	0.42	New	0	±0
Blank ballots	426	2.03	−0.29		
Total	20,984			25	±0
Valid votes	20,984	99.07	+0.06		
Invalid votes	197	0.93	−0.06		
Votes cast / turnout	21,181	45.26	−15.36		
Abstentions	25,619	54.74	+15.36		
Registered voters	46,800				

=== El Puerto de Santa María ===
Population: 88,700

← Summary of the 24 May 2015 City Council of El Puerto de Santa María election results →
Parties and alliances	Popular vote			Seats	
Parties and alliances	Votes	%	±pp	Total	+/−
People's Party (PP)	10,885	31.71	−6.24	9	−2
Spanish Socialist Workers' Party of Andalusia (PSOE–A)	6,953	20.26	+6.46	6	+2
Let's Raise El Puerto (Levantemos)	5,223	15.22	New	4	+4
United Left/The Greens–Assembly for Andalusia (IULV–CA)	3,569	10.40	−2.70	3	±0
Citizens–Party of the Citizenry (C's)^{1}	3,255	9.48	−1.96	2	−1
Andalusian Party (PA)	2,198	6.40	−10.84	1	−3
We Want Puerto (Qp)	953	2.78	New	0	±0
Union, Progress and Democracy (UPyD)	722	2.10	−1.13	0	±0
Blank ballots	569	1.66	−0.92		
Total	34,327			25	±0
Valid votes	34,327	99.22	+0.42		
Invalid votes	271	0.78	−0.42		
Votes cast / turnout	34,598	50.73	−2.68		
Abstentions	33,598	49.27	+2.68		
Registered voters	68,196				
Sources
Footnotes: ^{1} Citizens–Party of the Citizenry results are compared to Portuese Independents totals in the 2011 election.

=== Fuengirola ===
Population: 75,856

← Summary of the 24 May 2015 City Council of Fuengirola election results →
Parties and alliances	Popular vote			Seats	
Parties and alliances	Votes	%	±pp	Total	+/−
People's Party (PP)	11,668	49.66	−14.82	14	−4
Spanish Socialist Workers' Party of Andalusia (PSOE–A)	4,722	20.10	−0.16	5	±0
Citizens–Party of the Citizenry (C's)	2,341	9.96	New	2	+2
Costa del Sol Can... Tic Tac (CSSPTT)	2,034	8.66	New	2	+2
United Left/The Greens–Assembly–Fuengirola for the People (IULV–CA–PG)	1,691	7.20	−1.34	2	±0
Andalusian Party (PA)	474	2.02	−1.40	0	±0
Union, Progress and Democracy (UPyD)	322	1.37	New	0	±0
Blank ballots	244	1.04	−0.92		
Total	23,496			25	±0
Valid votes	23,496	99.14	+0.36		
Invalid votes	203	0.86	−0.36		
Votes cast / turnout	23,699	52.11	−6.22		
Abstentions	21,782	47.89	+6.22		
Registered voters	45,481				

=== Granada ===
Population: 237,540

← Summary of the 24 May 2015 City Council of Granada election results →
Parties and alliances	Popular vote			Seats	
Parties and alliances	Votes	%	±pp	Total	+/−
People's Party (PP)	39,358	35.64	−16.23	11	−5
Spanish Socialist Workers' Party of Andalusia (PSOE–A)	28,561	25.86	−1.34	8	±0
Citizens–Party of the Citizenry (C's)	15,521	14.05	New	4	+4
Let's Go Granada (Vamos)	14,115	12.78	New	3	+3
United Left–Socialist Alternative–For the People (IU–AS–PG)	6,464	5.85	−1.95	1	−1
Union, Progress and Democracy (UPyD)	2,287	2.07	−3.28	0	−1
Vox (Vox)	1,004	0.91	New	0	±0
Animalist Party Against Mistreatment of Animals (PACMA)	936	0.85	New	0	±0
Andalusian Party (PA)	373	0.34	−0.57	0	±0
For a Fairer World (PUM+J)	353	0.32	+0.01	0	±0
Spanish Phalanx of the CNSO (FE de las JONS)	155	0.14	−0.04	0	±0
Communist Party of the Peoples of Spain (PCPE)	115	0.10	New	0	±0
Andalusian Nation (NA)	75	0.07	New	0	±0
Blank ballots	1,127	1.02	−1.51		
Total	110,444			27	±0
Valid votes	110,444	99.29	+0.87		
Invalid votes	795	0.71	−0.87		
Votes cast / turnout	111,239	59.78	−3.29		
Abstentions	74,827	40.22	+3.29		
Registered voters	186,066				

=== Huelva ===
Population: 147,212

← Summary of the 24 May 2015 City Council of Huelva election results →
Parties and alliances	Popular vote			Seats	
Parties and alliances	Votes	%	±pp	Total	+/−
Spanish Socialist Workers' Party of Andalusia (PSOE–A)	20,776	35.28	+4.82	11	+2
People's Party (PP)	15,718	26.69	−18.64	8	−6
Citizens–Party of the Citizenry (C's)	5,952	10.11	New	3	+3
United Left/The Greens–Assembly for Andalusia (IULV–CA)	5,899	10.02	−0.05	3	±0
Huelva Estuary Board (MRH)	3,758	6.38	+1.02	1	±0
Participate Huelva (Participa Huelva)	3,122	5.30	New	1	+1
Vox (Vox)	1,071	1.82	New	0	±0
Andalusian Party (PA)	1,028	1.75	−1.24	0	±0
Union, Progress and Democracy (UPyD)	579	0.98	−0.95	0	±0
National Democracy (DN)	143	0.24	−0.22	0	±0
Communist Party of the Peoples of Spain (PCPE)	110	0.19	New	0	±0
Blank ballots	733	1.24	−1.22		
Total	58,889			27	±0
Valid votes	58,889	99.19	+0.44		
Invalid votes	478	0.81	−0.44		
Votes cast / turnout	59,367	52.09	−3.58		
Abstentions	54,598	47.91	+3.58		
Registered voters	113,965				

=== Jaén ===
Population: 115,837

← Summary of the 24 May 2015 City Council of Jaén election results →
Parties and alliances	Popular vote			Seats	
Parties and alliances	Votes	%	±pp	Total	+/−
People's Party (PP)	21,129	38.36	−13.39	12	−4
Spanish Socialist Workers' Party of Andalusia (PSOE–A)	16,249	29.50	−5.55	9	−1
Citizens–Party of the Citizenry (C's)	6,240	11.33	New	3	+3
Jaén in Common (JeC)	5,698	10.34	New	3	+3
United Left/The Greens–Assembly for Andalusia (IULV–CA)	2,250	4.08	−1.86	0	−1
Animalist Party Against Mistreatment of Animals (PACMA)	799	1.45	New	0	±0
Union, Progress and Democracy (UPyD)	702	1.27	−1.91	0	±0
Andalusian Party (PA)	478	0.87	−0.46	0	±0
Vox (Vox)	426	0.77	New	0	±0
Internationalist Solidarity and Self-Management (SAIn)	121	0.22	New	0	±0
Communist Party of the Peoples of Spain (PCPE)	114	0.21	−0.24	0	±0
Blank ballots	875	1.59	−0.69		
Total	55,081			27	±0
Valid votes	55,081	98.92	+0.19		
Invalid votes	599	1.08	−0.19		
Votes cast / turnout	55,680	60.89	−8.35		
Abstentions	35,758	39.11	+8.35		
Registered voters	91,438				

=== Jerez de la Frontera ===
Population: 212,226

← Summary of the 24 May 2015 City Council of Jerez de la Frontera election results →
Parties and alliances	Popular vote			Seats	
Parties and alliances	Votes	%	±pp	Total	+/−
People's Party (PP)	30,761	34.12	−12.44	11	−4
Spanish Socialist Workers' Party of Andalusia (PSOE–A)	21,819	24.20	+9.56	7	+2
Let's Win Jerez (GJ)	14,631	16.23	New	5	+5
Citizens–Party of the Citizenry (C's)	7,999	8.87	New	2	+2
United Left/The Greens–Assembly for Andalusia (IULV–CA)	6,594	7.31	−4.18	2	−1
Citizen Forum of Jerez (FCJ)	2,952	3.27	−10.76	0	−4
Andalusian Party (PA)	1,994	2.21	−1.81	0	±0
Union, Progress and Democracy (UPyD)	1,150	1.28	−1.77	0	±0
Jerezan Progressive Initiative (IPJ)	628	0.70	−0.33	0	±0
Communist Party of the Peoples of Spain (PCPE)	223	0.25	−0.09	0	±0
Blank ballots	1,397	1.55	−0.82		
Total	90,148			27	±0
Valid votes	90,148	99.28	+0.34		
Invalid votes	656	0.72	−0.34		
Votes cast / turnout	90,804	54.75	−5.89		
Abstentions	75,058	45.25	+5.89		
Registered voters	165,862				

=== La Línea de la Concepción ===
Population: 63,132

← Summary of the 24 May 2015 City Council of La Línea de la Concepción election results →
Parties and alliances	Popular vote			Seats	
Parties and alliances	Votes	%	±pp	Total	+/−
Spanish Socialist Workers' Party of Andalusia (PSOE–A)	7,555	34.15	−0.96	9	−1
La Línea 100x100 (LL100x100)	6,850	30.96	New	9	+9
People's Party (PP)	4,519	20.42	−20.51	5	−6
United Left/The Greens–Assembly for Andalusia (IULV–CA)	1,420	6.42	−2.41	1	−1
Andalusian Party (PA)	1,157	5.23	−3.39	1	−1
Union, Progress and Democracy (UPyD)	368	1.66	New	0	±0
Blank ballots	257	1.16	−1.16		
Total	22,126			25	±0
Valid votes	22,126	99.17	+0.31		
Invalid votes	186	0.83	−0.31		
Votes cast / turnout	22,312	45.37	−7.22		
Abstentions	26,865	54.63	+7.22		
Registered voters	49,177				

=== Linares ===
Population: 60,290

← Summary of the 24 May 2015 City Council of Linares election results →
Parties and alliances	Popular vote			Seats	
Parties and alliances	Votes	%	±pp	Total	+/−
Spanish Socialist Workers' Party of Andalusia (PSOE–A)	9,286	36.10	−4.70	10	−1
People's Party (PP)	7,333	28.51	−11.51	8	−3
United Left/The Greens–Assembly for Andalusia (IULV–CA)	3,745	14.56	+3.58	4	+1
Citizens–Party of the Citizenry (C's)	2,425	9.43	New	2	+2
United Free Citizens (CILUS)	1,516	5.89	New	1	+1
Andalusian Party (PA)	492	1.91	+0.07	0	±0
Union, Progress and Democracy (UPyD)	262	1.02	−3.08	0	±0
Vox (Vox)	193	0.75	New	0	±0
Blank ballots	471	1.83	−0.42		
Total	25,723			25	±0
Valid votes	25,723	98.36	−0.28		
Invalid votes	429	1.64	+0.28		
Votes cast / turnout	26,152	54.81	−5.32		
Abstentions	21,560	45.19	+5.32		
Registered voters	47,712				

=== Málaga ===
Population: 566,913

← Summary of the 24 May 2015 City Council of Málaga election results →
Parties and alliances	Popular vote			Seats	
Parties and alliances	Votes	%	±pp	Total	+/−
People's Party (PP)	84,156	36.60	−16.86	13	−6
Spanish Socialist Workers' Party of Andalusia (PSOE–A)	60,246	26.20	+1.45	9	±0
Málaga Now (Málaga Ahora)	30,600	13.31	New	4	+4
Citizens–Party of the Citizenry (C's)	23,859	10.38	+10.06	3	+3
United Left/The Greens–Assembly–Alternative (IULV–CA–CLI–AS)	17,130	7.45	−3.51	2	−1
Animalist Party Against Mistreatment of Animals (PACMA)	3,403	1.48	+1.01	0	±0
Union, Progress and Democracy (UPyD)	2,744	1.19	−2.31	0	±0
Andalusian Party (PA)	1,380	0.60	−0.05	0	±0
To Solution (Soluciona)	1,169	0.51	New	0	±0
Vox (Vox)	794	0.35	New	0	±0
United Free Citizens (CILUS)	635	0.28	New	0	±0
Communist Party of the Peoples of Spain (PCPE)	537	0.23	+0.04	0	±0
Union of Independent Citizens (UCIN)	376	0.16	New	0	±0
Citizens' Democratic Renewal Movement (RED)	374	0.16	New	0	±0
Internationalist Solidarity and Self-Management (SAIn)	160	0.07	−0.04	0	±0
Blank ballots	2,378	1.03	−1.32		
Total	229,941			31	±0
Valid votes	229,941	99.43	+0.53		
Invalid votes	1,312	0.57	−0.53		
Votes cast / turnout	231,253	54.37	−1.22		
Abstentions	194,076	45.63	+1.22		
Registered voters	425,329				

=== Marbella ===
Population: 138,679

← Summary of the 24 May 2015 City Council of Marbella election results →
Parties and alliances	Popular vote			Seats	
Parties and alliances	Votes	%	±pp	Total	+/−
People's Party (PP)	19,405	41.01	−9.07	13	−2
Spanish Socialist Workers' Party of Andalusia (PSOE–A)	12,444	26.30	+1.15	8	+1
San Pedro Option (OSP)	4,336	9.16	−0.65	2	−1
Costa del Sol Can... Tic Tac (CSSPTT)	3,880	8.20	New	2	+2
United Left/The Greens–Assembly–Marbella for the People (IULV–CA–PG)	3,202	6.77	−0.93	2	±0
Andalusian Party (PA)	1,473	3.11	New	0	±0
Citizens, Inhabitants and People of Marbella (Change Marbella)	939	1.98	New	0	±0
Union, Progress and Democracy (UPyD)	804	1.70	−0.18	0	±0
Party of the South (PASUR)	137	0.29	+0.12	0	±0
Neo-Democrats (Neodemócratas)	59	0.12	New	0	±0
Blank ballots	634	1.34	−0.87		
Total	47,313			27	±0
Valid votes	47,313	99.01	+0.33		
Invalid votes	475	0.99	−0.33		
Votes cast / turnout	47,788	53.64	−1.26		
Abstentions	41,307	46.36	+1.26		
Registered voters	89,095				

=== Mijas ===
Population: 77,521

← Summary of the 24 May 2015 City Council of Mijas election results →
Parties and alliances	Popular vote			Seats	
Parties and alliances	Votes	%	±pp	Total	+/−
People's Party (PP)	8,439	36.38	−13.58	11	−4
Spanish Socialist Workers' Party of Andalusia (PSOE–A)	6,078	26.20	+1.10	7	±0
Citizens–Party of the Citizenry (C's)	3,974	17.13	New	5	+5
Costa del Sol Can... Tic Tac (CSSPTT)	1,683	7.26	New	2	+2
United Left/The Greens–Assembly–Mijas for the People (IULV–CA–PG)	862	3.72	−0.21	0	±0
Mijas Wins (Mijenian Alternative+Equo+Independent Neighbours) (Mijas Gana)	850	3.66	−1.64	0	−1
Union, Progress and Democracy (UPyD)	556	2.40	−0.64	0	±0
Andalusian Party (PA)	511	2.20	−2.09	0	±0
Independent Group of Mijas (GIM Mijas)	n/a	n/a	−6.82	0	−2
Blank ballots	242	1.04	−0.53		
Total	23,195			25	±0
Valid votes	23,195	99.33	+0.41		
Invalid votes	157	0.67	−0.41		
Votes cast / turnout	23,352	54.54	−4.41		
Abstentions	19,468	45.46	+4.41		
Registered voters	42,820				

=== Morón de la Frontera ===
Population: 28,241

← Summary of the 24 May 2015 City Council of Morón de la Frontera election results →
Parties and alliances	Popular vote			Seats	
Parties and alliances	Votes	%	±pp	Total	+/−
Spanish Socialist Workers' Party of Andalusia (PSOE–A)	6,215	50.57	+4.47	11	+1
Alternative Moroneran Assembly (AMA–Morón)	2,808	22.85	+9.46	5	+2
People's Party (PP)	1,644	13.38	−14.59	3	−3
United Left/The Greens–Assembly for Andalusia (IULV–CA)	1,390	11.31	+0.87	2	±0
Blank ballots	234	1.90	−0.21		
Total	12,291			21	±0
Valid votes	12,291	98.39	+0.17		
Invalid votes	201	1.61	−0.17		
Votes cast / turnout	12,492	54.40	−8.30		
Abstentions	10,473	45.60	+8.30		
Registered voters	22,965				

=== Motril ===
Population: 60,870

← Summary of the 24 May 2015 City Council of Motril election results →
Parties and alliances	Popular vote			Seats	
Parties and alliances	Votes	%	±pp	Total	+/−
People's Party (PP)	7,795	31.81	−14.12	10	−3
Spanish Socialist Workers' Party of Andalusia (PSOE–A)	5,582	22.78	+2.94	7	+2
Andalusian Party (PA)	4,026	16.43	+6.46	5	+2
United Left/The Greens–Assembly for Andalusia (IULV–CA)	2,734	11.16	+1.39	3	+1
Citizens–Party of the Citizenry (C's)	1,222	4.99	New	0	±0
Citizen Convergence Movement (MCCiudadana)^{1}	1,116	4.55	−2.38	0	−2
Independent Group for the Municipal Autonomy of Torrenueva (GRITO)	940	3.84	+0.35	0	±0
Equo (Equo)	742	3.03	New	0	±0
Blank ballots	351	1.43	−0.48		
Total	24,508			25	±0
Valid votes	24,508	98.91	+0.06		
Invalid votes	270	1.09	−0.06		
Votes cast / turnout	24,778	56.37	−6.94		
Abstentions	19,177	43.63	+6.94		
Registered voters	43,955				
Sources
Footnotes: ^{1} Citizen Convergence Movement results are compared to Andalusian Convergence totals in the 2011 election.

=== Ronda ===
Population: 35,059

← Summary of the 24 May 2015 City Council of Ronda election results →
Parties and alliances	Popular vote			Seats	
Parties and alliances	Votes	%	±pp	Total	+/−
People's Party (PP)	4,475	29.50	+0.36	7	±0
Spanish Socialist Workers' Party of Andalusia (PSOE–A)	3,974	26.19	3.89	6	−1
Alliance for Ronda (APR)	1,945	12.82	New	3	+3
Andalusian Party (PA)	1,793	11.82	−12.97	3	−2
United Left/The Greens–Assembly–Ronda for the People (IULV–CA–RPG)	1,407	9.27	−0.16	2	±0
Ronda Yes We Can (RSSP)	740	4.88	New	0	±0
Ronda Green Space (EVA)	275	1.81	New	0	±0
Let's Win Ronda (Ganemos)	256	1.69	New	0	±0
Blank ballots	307	2.02	−0.20		
Total	15,172			21	±0
Valid votes	15,172	98.31	−0.11		
Invalid votes	261	1.69	+0.11		
Votes cast / turnout	15,433	55.61	−9.81		
Abstentions	12,318	44.39	+9.81		
Registered voters	27,751				
Sources
Footnotes: ^{1} Andalusian Party–Andalusian Plural Space results are compared to the combined totals of Andalusian Party and Socialist Party of Andalusia in the 2007 election.

=== Roquetas de Mar ===
Population: 91,682

← Summary of the 24 May 2015 City Council of Roquetas de Mar election results →
Parties and alliances	Popular vote			Seats	
Parties and alliances	Votes	%	±pp	Total	+/−
People's Party (PP)	10,369	40.94	−17.99	12	−4
Spanish Socialist Workers' Party of Andalusia (PSOE–A)	5,346	21.11	+2.92	6	+1
United Left Roquetas+Independents–For the People (IU–PG)	3,240	12.79	+1.64	3	±0
Citizens–Party of the Citizenry (C's)	3,096	12.22	New	3	+3
You Decide (Tú Decides)	1,470	5.80	New	1	+1
Independents of Aguadulce and El Parador (INDAPA)	1,165	4.60	−1.05	0	−1
Union, Progress and Democracy (UPyD)	239	0.94	−2.62	0	±0
Blank ballots	405	1.60	−0.92		
Total	25,330			25	±0
Valid votes	25,330	99.02	+0.07		
Invalid votes	251	0.98	−0.07		
Votes cast / turnout	25,581	50.00	−4.61		
Abstentions	25,585	50.00	+4.61		
Registered voters	51,166				

=== San Fernando ===
Population: 96,335

← Summary of the 24 May 2015 City Council of San Fernando election results →
Parties and alliances	Popular vote			Seats	
Parties and alliances	Votes	%	±pp	Total	+/−
Spanish Socialist Workers' Party of Andalusia (PSOE–A)	11,873	29.76	−4.24	8	−1
People's Party (PP)	9,247	23.17	−11.78	7	−3
Yes We Can San Fernando (SSPSF)	5,759	14.43	New	4	+4
Andalusian Party (PA)	4,946	12.40	+1.06	3	±0
Citizens–Party of the Citizenry (C's)	4,278	10.72	New	3	+3
United Left/The Greens–Assembly for Andalusia (IULV–CA)	1,873	4.69	−0.60	0	−1
Union, Progress and Democracy (UPyD)	646	1.62	−2.90	0	±0
Vox (Vox)	447	1.12	New	0	±0
Platform 3R (Plataforma 3R)	281	0.70	New	0	±0
Citizens for San Fernando (CxSF)	n/a	n/a	−7.33	0	−2
Blank ballots	552	1.38	−1.17		
Total	39,902			25	±0
Valid votes	39,902	99.25	+0.33		
Invalid votes	302	0.75	−0.33		
Votes cast / turnout	40,204	52.46	−1.10		
Abstentions	36,439	47.54	+1.10		
Registered voters	76,643				

=== Sanlúcar de Barrameda ===
Population: 67,385

← Summary of the 24 May 2015 City Council of Sanlúcar de Barrameda election results →
Parties and alliances	Popular vote			Seats	
Parties and alliances	Votes	%	±pp	Total	+/−
Spanish Socialist Workers' Party of Andalusia (PSOE–A)	7,353	32.01	−5.14	9	−1
People's Party (PP)	4,600	24.66	−4.63	6	−1
United Left/The Greens–Assembly for Andalusia (IULV–CA)	3,743	16.30	+3.14	4	+1
For Sanlúcar Yes We Can (PSLSSP)	3,023	13.16	New	3	+3
Citizens–Party of the Citizenry (C's)^{1}	2,830	12.32	+1.66	3	±0
Andalusian Party (PA)	1,010	4.40	−3.75	0	−2
Blank ballots	410	1.79	−0.65		
Total	22,969			25	±0
Valid votes	22,969	99.06	+0.11		
Invalid votes	219	0.94	−0.11		
Votes cast / turnout	23,188	43.00	−7.50		
Abstentions	30,740	57.00	+7.50		
Registered voters	53,928				
Sources
Footnotes: ^{1} Citizens–Party of the Citizenry results are compared to Independent Citizens of Sanlúcar totals in the 2011 election.

=== Seville ===
Population: 696,676

=== Utrera ===
Population: 52,437

← Summary of the 24 May 2015 City Council of Utrera election results →
Parties and alliances	Popular vote			Seats	
Parties and alliances	Votes	%	±pp	Total	+/−
Spanish Socialist Workers' Party of Andalusia (PSOE–A)	10,095	43.58	+8.70	12	+2
Andalusian Party (PA)	7,368	31.81	−1.42	9	±0
United Left/The Greens–Assembly for Andalusia (IULV–CA)	1,813	7.83	+1.12	2	+1
People's Party (PP)	1,690	7.30	−8.08	2	−2
Union, Progress and Democracy (UPyD)	987	4.26	−1.17	0	−1
Utreran Party (PU)	554	2.39	New	0	±0
Independent Group Pro-City Council of El Palmar de Troya (GIP)	297	1.28	−1.07	0	±0
Blank ballots	361	1.56	−0.46		
Total	23,165			25	±0
Valid votes	23,165	99.06	−0.07		
Invalid votes	220	0.94	+0.07		
Votes cast / turnout	23,385	56.96	−3.81		
Abstentions	17,673	43.04	+3.81		
Registered voters	41,058				

=== Vélez-Málaga ===
Population: 77,808

← Summary of the 24 May 2015 City Council of Vélez-Málaga election results →
Parties and alliances	Popular vote			Seats	
Parties and alliances	Votes	%	±pp	Total	+/−
People's Party (PP)	12,556	37.02	−9.72	10	−3
Spanish Socialist Workers' Party of Andalusia (PSOE–A)	9,285	27.37	+6.51	8	+2
United Left/The Greens–Assembly–Vélez-Málaga for the People (IULV–CA–PG)	2,549	7.51	−0.13	2	±0
Pro-Torre del Mar Municipality Independent Group (GIPMTM)	2,396	7.06	−0.37	2	±0
Andalusian Party (PA)	2,321	6.84	−2.62	2	±0
Citizens–Party of the Citizenry (C's)	1,913	5.64	New	1	+1
Let's Sum Vélez-Málaga (SVM)	1,255	3.70	New	0	±0
Union of Independent Citizens (UCIN)	541	1.59	New	0	±0
Citizens for their People (CPSP)	343	1.01	New	0	±0
Union, Progress and Democracy (UPyD)	305	0.90	−1.83	0	±0
Blank ballots	456	1.34	−0.76		
Total	33,920			25	±0
Valid votes	33,920	98.99	+0.46		
Invalid votes	347	1.01	−0.46		
Votes cast / turnout	34,267	59.11	−7.87		
Abstentions	23,708	40.89	+7.87		
Registered voters	57,975				
