= 2011 Spanish local elections in Andalusia =

This article presents the results breakdown of the local elections held in Andalusia on 22 May 2011. The following tables show detailed results in the autonomous community's most populous municipalities, sorted alphabetically.

== City control ==
The following table lists party control in the most populous municipalities, including provincial capitals (shown in bold). Gains for a party are displayed with the cell's background shaded in that party's colour.

Municipality	Population	Previous control	New control
Alcalá de Guadaíra	71,740	Spanish Socialist Workers' Party of Andalusia (PSOE–A)	Spanish Socialist Workers' Party of Andalusia (PSOE–A)
Algeciras	116,417	Spanish Socialist Workers' Party of Andalusia (PSOE–A)	People's Party (PP)
**Almería**	190,013	People's Party (PP)	People's Party (PP)
Antequera	41,848	Spanish Socialist Workers' Party of Andalusia (PSOE–A)	People's Party (PP)
Benalmádena	61,383	People's Party (PP)	Spanish Socialist Workers' Party of Andalusia (PSOE–A) (PP in 2012)
**Cádiz**	125,826	People's Party (PP)	People's Party (PP)
Chiclana de la Frontera	78,591	Spanish Socialist Workers' Party of Andalusia (PSOE–A)	People's Party (PP)
**Córdoba**	328,547	United Left/The Greens–Assembly for Andalusia (IULV–CA)	People's Party (PP)
Dos Hermanas	125,086	Spanish Socialist Workers' Party of Andalusia (PSOE–A)	Spanish Socialist Workers' Party of Andalusia (PSOE–A)
Écija	40,534	Spanish Socialist Workers' Party of Andalusia (PSOE–A)	People's Party (PP)
El Ejido	85,389	Party of Almería (PdeAL)	People's Party (PP)
El Puerto de Santa María	88,503	People's Party (PP)	People's Party (PP)
Fuengirola	71,783	People's Party (PP)	People's Party (PP)
**Granada**	239,154	People's Party (PP)	People's Party (PP)
**Huelva**	149,310	People's Party (PP)	People's Party (PP)
**Jaén**	116,790	Spanish Socialist Workers' Party of Andalusia (PSOE–A)	People's Party (PP)
Jerez de la Frontera	208,896	Spanish Socialist Workers' Party of Andalusia (PSOE–A)	People's Party (PP)
La Línea de la Concepción	64,645	People's Party (PP)	Spanish Socialist Workers' Party of Andalusia (PSOE–A)
Linares	61,306	Spanish Socialist Workers' Party of Andalusia (PSOE–A)	Spanish Socialist Workers' Party of Andalusia (PSOE–A)
**Málaga**	568,507	People's Party (PP)	People's Party (PP)
Marbella	136,322	People's Party (PP)	People's Party (PP)
Mijas	76,362	Spanish Socialist Workers' Party of Andalusia (PSOE–A)	People's Party (PP)
Morón de la Frontera	28,467	People's Party (PP)	Spanish Socialist Workers' Party of Andalusia (PSOE–A)
Motril	60,884	People's Party (PP)	People's Party (PP)
Ronda	36,909	Spanish Socialist Workers' Party of Andalusia (PSOE–A)	People's Party (PP)
Roquetas de Mar	85,808	People's Party (PP)	People's Party (PP)
San Fernando	96,689	Andalusian Party–Andalusian Plural Space (PA–EPAnd)	People's Party (PP)
Sanlúcar de Barrameda	66,541	Spanish Socialist Workers' Party of Andalusia (PSOE–A)	Spanish Socialist Workers' Party of Andalusia (PSOE–A)
**Seville**	704,198	Spanish Socialist Workers' Party of Andalusia (PSOE–A)	People's Party (PP)
Utrera	51,177	Andalusian Party–Andalusian Plural Space (PA–EPAnd)	Andalusian Party–Andalusian Plural Space (PA–EPAnd)
Vélez-Málaga	75,623	Spanish Socialist Workers' Party of Andalusia (PSOE–A)	People's Party (PP)

== Municipalities ==
=== Alcalá de Guadaíra ===
Population: 71,740

← Summary of the 22 May 2011 City Council of Alcalá de Guadaíra election results →
Parties and alliances	Popular vote			Seats	
Parties and alliances	Votes	%	±pp	Total	+/−
Spanish Socialist Workers' Party of Andalusia (PSOE–A)	13,068	43.23	−19.05	13	−5
People's Party (PP)	9,442	31.23	+10.66	9	+4
Andalusian Party–Andalusian Plural Space (PA–EPAnd)	2,891	9.56	+2.92	2	+1
United Left/The Greens–Assembly for Andalusia (IULV–CA)	1,930	6.38	+0.52	1	±0
Union, Progress and Democracy (UPyD)	1,180	3.90	New	0	±0
Left Socialist Initiative (ISI)	370	1.22	New	0	±0
National Front (FrN)	368	1.22	New	0	±0
Blank ballots	981	3.25	+1.20		
Total	30,230			25	±0
Valid votes	30,230	97.72	−1.78		
Invalid votes	705	2.28	+1.78		
Votes cast / turnout	30,935	56.32	+8.85		
Abstentions	23,991	43.68	−8.85		
Registered voters	54,926				

=== Algeciras ===
Population: 116,417

← Summary of the 22 May 2011 City Council of Algeciras election results →
Parties and alliances	Popular vote			Seats	
Parties and alliances	Votes	%	±pp	Total	+/−
People's Party (PP)	22,463	51.80	+22.94	16	+6
Spanish Socialist Workers' Party of Andalusia (PSOE–A)	8,104	18.69	−19.51	6	−7
United Left/The Greens–Assembly for Andalusia (IULV–CA)	5,301	12.22	+1.11	3	−1
Andalusian Party–Andalusian Plural Space (PA–EPAnd)^{1}	3,356	7.74	+2.04	2	+2
Union, Progress and Democracy (UPyD)	1,346	3.10	New	0	±0
United Algeciran Youth (JAU)	620	1.43	New	0	±0
Liberal Democratic Centre (CDL)	343	0.79	New	0	±0
Party of the Elderly and the Self-employed (PdMA)	258	0.59	New	0	±0
National Alliance (AN)	129	0.30	New	0	±0
Blank ballots	1,448	3.34	+1.93		
Total	43,368			27	±0
Valid votes	43,368	98.32	−1.19		
Invalid votes	739	1.68	+1.19		
Votes cast / turnout	44,107	50.37	+5.37		
Abstentions	43,459	49.63	−5.37		
Registered voters	87,566				
Sources
Footnotes: ^{1} Andalusian Party–Andalusian Plural Space results are compared to the combined totals of Andalusian Party and Socialist Party of Andalusia in the 2007 election.

=== Almería ===
Population: 190,013

← Summary of the 22 May 2011 City Council of Almería election results →
Parties and alliances	Popular vote			Seats	
Parties and alliances	Votes	%	±pp	Total	+/−
People's Party (PP)^{1}	44,785	58.50	+5.93	18	+3
Spanish Socialist Workers' Party of Andalusia (PSOE–A)	17,474	22.82	−13.99	7	−4
United Left/The Greens–Assembly for Andalusia (IULV–CA)	6,615	8.64	+3.42	2	+1
Union, Progress and Democracy (UPyD)	2,814	3.68	New	0	±0
The Greens–Ecological Andalusia (LV–AE)	991	1.29	+0.22	0	±0
Andalusian Party–Andalusian Plural Space (PA–EPAnd)^{2}	947	1.24	−0.54	0	±0
Anti-Bullfighting Party Against Mistreatment of Animals (PACMA)	395	0.52	New	0	±0
Almerian Neighbourhood Union (UVAL)	360	0.47	New	0	±0
Group and Union for the Progress of Almeria (AUPAL)	227	0.30	New	0	±0
National Democracy (DN)	167	0.22	New	0	±0
Blank ballots	1,784	2.33	+0.95		
Total	76,559			27	±0
Valid votes	76,559	98.64	−1.04		
Invalid votes	1,054	1.36	+1.04		
Votes cast / turnout	77,613	56.58	+4.84		
Abstentions	59,558	43.42	−4.84		
Registered voters	137,171				
Sources
Footnotes: ^{1} People's Party results are compared to the combined totals of People's Party and Independent Group for Almería in the 2007 election.; ^{2} Andalusian Party–Andalusian Plural Space results are compared to the combined totals of Andalusian Party and Socialist Party of Andalusia in the 2007 election.

=== Antequera ===
Population: 41,848

← Summary of the 22 May 2011 City Council of Antequera election results →
Parties and alliances	Popular vote			Seats	
Parties and alliances	Votes	%	±pp	Total	+/−
People's Party (PP)	9,317	44.56	+15.38	11	+4
Spanish Socialist Workers' Party of Andalusia (PSOE–A)	6,581	31.47	−8.19	7	−3
United Left/The Greens–Assembly for Andalusia (IULV–CA)	3,233	15.46	+0.45	3	±0
Party of the Annexes and the Neighbourhoods of Antequera (PABA)	884	4.23	−2.06	0	−1
Andalusian Party–Andalusian Plural Space (PA–EPAnd)^{1}	464	2.22	−0.83	0	±0
Blank ballots	432	2.07	+0.89		
Total	20,911			21	±0
Valid votes	20,911	99.04	−0.60		
Invalid votes	202	0.96	+0.60		
Votes cast / turnout	21,113	66.30	+4.73		
Abstentions	10,731	33.70	−4.73		
Registered voters	31,844				
Sources
Footnotes: ^{1} Andalusian Party–Andalusian Plural Space results are compared to the combined totals of Andalusian Party and Socialist Party of Andalusia in the 2007 election.

=== Benalmádena ===
Population: 61,383

← Summary of the 22 May 2011 City Council of Benalmádena election results →
Parties and alliances	Popular vote			Seats	
Parties and alliances	Votes	%	±pp	Total	+/−
People's Party (PP)^{1}	7,395	35.58	+10.67	11	+5
Spanish Socialist Workers' Party of Andalusia (PSOE–A)	5,173	24.89	−0.91	7	±0
Benalmádena Centre Union (UCB)^{2}	3,174	15.27	+0.16	4	±0
United Left/The Greens–Assembly for Andalusia (IULV–CA)	1,854	8.92	−1.71	2	−1
Benalmádena Independent Liberal Organization (BOLIN)	1,324	6.37	New	1	+1
Union, Progress and Democracy (UPyD)	531	2.55	New	0	±0
Independent Group–Ecologist Greens of Benalmádena (GIB–VEB)^{3}	467	2.25	−18.80	0	−5
Platform of United Independents (PIU)	183	0.88	New	0	±0
Andalusian Party–Socialist Party–Andalusian Plural Space (PA–PSA–EPAnd)^{4}	159	0.77	−0.53	0	±0
Spanish Phalanx of the CNSO (FE de las JONS)	61	0.29	New	0	±0
Blank ballots	463	2.23	+1.02		
Total	20,784			25	±0
Valid votes	20,784	98.89	−0.74		
Invalid votes	234	1.11	+0.74		
Votes cast / turnout	21,018	56.47	+1.97		
Abstentions	16,202	43.53	−1.97		
Registered voters	37,220				
Sources
Footnotes: ^{1} People's Party results are compared to the combined totals of People's Party and Democratic Initiative for Benalmádena in the 2007 election.; ^{2} Benalmádena Centre Union results are compared to Movement for Benalmádena totals in the 2007 election.; ^{3} Independent Group–Ecologist Greens of Benalmádena results are compared to the combined totals of Independent Group of Benalmádena and Andalusian Convergence–Ecologist Greens of Benalmádena in the 2007 election.; ^{4} Andalusian Party–Socialist Party–Andalusian Plural Space results are compared to the combined totals of Andalusian Party and Socialist Party of Andalusia in the 2007 election.

=== Cádiz ===
Population: 125,826

← Summary of the 22 May 2011 City Council of Cádiz election results →
Parties and alliances	Popular vote			Seats	
Parties and alliances	Votes	%	±pp	Total	+/−
People's Party (PP)	33,046	56.34	−3.43	17	−1
Spanish Socialist Workers' Party of Andalusia (PSOE–A)	13,035	22.22	−5.14	7	−1
United Left/The Greens–Assembly for Andalusia (IULV–CA)	5,559	9.48	+2.85	3	+2
Union, Progress and Democracy (UPyD)	2,131	3.63	New	0	±0
Andalusian Party–Andalusian Plural Space (PA–EPAnd)^{1}	1,164	1.98	−1.30	0	±0
Anti-capitalist Left (IzAn)	912	1.55	New	0	±0
Anti-Bullfighting Party Against Mistreatment of Animals (PACMA)	503	0.86	New	0	±0
Citizens for Blank Votes (CenB)	459	0.78	New	0	±0
Citizens for Cádiz (CPCAD)	341	0.58	New	0	±0
For a Fairer World (PUM+J)	287	0.49	New	0	±0
Blank ballots	1,214	2.07	+0.90		
Total	58,651			27	±0
Valid votes	58,651	98.75	−0.74		
Invalid votes	742	1.25	+0.74		
Votes cast / turnout	59,393	56.84	+5.24		
Abstentions	45,096	43.16	−5.24		
Registered voters	104,489				
Sources
Footnotes: ^{1} Andalusian Party–Andalusian Plural Space results are compared to the combined totals of Andalusian Party and Socialist Party of Andalusia in the 2007 election.

=== Chiclana de la Frontera ===
Population: 78,591

← Summary of the 22 May 2011 City Council of Chiclana de la Frontera election results →
Parties and alliances	Popular vote			Seats	
Parties and alliances	Votes	%	±pp	Total	+/−
People's Party (PP)	11,434	37.26	+10.19	11	+3
Spanish Socialist Workers' Party of Andalusia (PSOE–A)	10,086	32.87	−6.80	10	−1
Regionalist Local Party (PVRE)	2,856	9.31	New	2	+2
United Left/The Greens–Assembly for Andalusia (IULV–CA)	2,334	7.61	−3.41	2	−1
United for Chiclana (UPCh)	889	2.90	New	0	±0
Union, Progress and Democracy (UPyD)	844	2.75	New	0	±0
Andalusian Party–Socialist Party–Andalusian Plural Space (PA–PSA–EPAnd)^{1}	598	1.95	−13.68	0	−3
Defense of the Andalusian People's Interests (DIPA)	479	1.56	−0.10	0	±0
Andalusian Unity Group (AUNA)	255	0.83	New	0	±0
Party of Spanish Self-employed and Independents (PAUTIE)	122	0.40	−0.88	0	±0
Blank ballots	791	2.58	+1.15		
Total	30,688			25	±0
Valid votes	30,688	98.57	−1.20		
Invalid votes	445	1.43	+1.20		
Votes cast / turnout	31,133	52.37	+8.73		
Abstentions	28,310	47.63	−8.73		
Registered voters	59,443				
Sources
Footnotes: ^{1} Andalusian Party–Socialist Party–Andalusian Plural Space results are compared to the combined totals of Andalusian Party and Socialist Party of Andalusia in the 2007 election.

=== Córdoba ===
Population: 328,547

← Summary of the 22 May 2011 City Council of Córdoba election results →
Parties and alliances	Popular vote			Seats	
Parties and alliances	Votes	%	±pp	Total	+/−
People's Party (PP)	79,493	48.80	+4.84	16	+2
Cordobese Union (UCOR)	24,805	15.23	New	5	+5
United Left/The Greens–Assembly for Andalusia (IULV–CA)	24,158	14.83	−20.83	4	−7
Spanish Socialist Workers' Party of Andalusia (PSOE–A)	19,544	12.00	−3.07	4	±0
Ecolo–Greens (Ecolo)^{1}	4,111	2.52	+1.39	0	±0
Union, Progress and Democracy (UPyD)	2,954	1.81	New	0	±0
Andalusian Party–Andalusian Plural Space (PA–EPAnd)^{2}	1,398	0.86	−1.09	0	±0
Citizens for Blank Votes (CenB)	1,130	0.69	New	0	±0
For a Fairer World (PUM+J)	494	0.30	New	0	±0
Communist Party of the Peoples of Spain (PCPE)	349	0.21	+0.13	0	±0
Internationalist Solidarity and Self-Management (SAIn)	226	0.14	New	0	±0
Union for Encinarejo (UniEn)	117	0.07	New	0	±0
Blank ballots	4,114	2.53	+0.91		
Total	162,893			29	±0
Valid votes	162,893	98.84	−0.80		
Invalid votes	1,909	1.16	+0.80		
Votes cast / turnout	164,802	63.48	+7.71		
Abstentions	94,803	36.52	−7.71		
Registered voters	259,605				
Sources
Footnotes: ^{1} Ecolo–Greens results are compared to The Greens 2007 totals in the 2007 election.; ^{2} Andalusian Party–Andalusian Plural Space results are compared to the combined totals of Andalusian Party and Socialist Party of Andalusia in the 2007 election.

=== Dos Hermanas ===
Population: 125,086

← Summary of the 22 May 2011 City Council of Dos Hermanas election results →
Parties and alliances	Popular vote			Seats	
Parties and alliances	Votes	%	±pp	Total	+/−
Spanish Socialist Workers' Party of Andalusia (PSOE–A)	24,612	47.14	−12.49	15	−3
People's Party (PP)	15,704	30.08	+9.52	9	+3
United Left/The Greens–Assembly for Andalusia (IULV–CA)	6,049	11.59	+1.19	3	±0
Union, Progress and Democracy (UPyD)	2,059	3.94	New	0	±0
Andalusian Party–Andalusian Plural Space (PA–EPAnd)^{1}	1,628	3.12	−3.63	0	±0
Citizens of Democratic Centre (CCD)	319	0.61	New	0	±0
Democratic Majority (MD)	232	0.44	New	0	±0
Blank ballots	1,611	3.09	+1.55		
Total	52,214			27	±0
Valid votes	52,214	98.46	−1.18		
Invalid votes	815	1.54	+1.18		
Votes cast / turnout	53,029	55.23	+9.46		
Abstentions	42,992	44.77	−9.46		
Registered voters	96,021				
Sources
Footnotes: ^{1} Andalusian Party–Andalusian Plural Space results are compared to the combined totals of Andalusian Party and Socialist Party of Andalusia in the 2007 election.

=== Écija ===
Population: 40,534

← Summary of the 22 May 2011 City Council of Écija election results →
Parties and alliances	Popular vote			Seats	
Parties and alliances	Votes	%	±pp	Total	+/−
People's Party (PP)	7,661	36.23	+18.84	9	+5
Spanish Socialist Workers' Party of Andalusia (PSOE–A)	6,862	32.46	−7.27	8	−1
Andalusian Party–Andalusian Plural Space (PA–EPAnd)	2,877	13.61	−10.51	3	−3
United Left/The Greens–Assembly for Andalusia (IULV–CA)	1,243	5.88	−0.36	1	±0
Independent Ecijan Socialist Party (PSEI)	944	4.46	−3.01	0	−1
Ecijan Force (FuE)	909	4.30	New	0	±0
Union, Progress and Democracy (UPyD)	230	1.09	New	0	±0
Blank ballots	417	1.97	+0.49		
Total	21,143			21	±0
Valid votes	21,143	99.15	−0.39		
Invalid votes	182	0.85	+0.39		
Votes cast / turnout	21,325	67.86	+1.70		
Abstentions	10,100	32.14	−1.70		
Registered voters	31,425				

=== El Ejido ===
Population: 85,389

← Summary of the 22 May 2011 City Council of El Ejido election results →
Parties and alliances	Popular vote			Seats	
Parties and alliances	Votes	%	±pp	Total	+/−
People's Party (PP)	13,100	49.06	+33.15	13	+9
Spanish Socialist Workers' Party of Andalusia (PSOE–A)	4,292	16.07	−5.33	4	−2
Party of Almería (PdeAL)	4,074	15.26	−36.63	4	−11
Union, Progress and Democracy (UPyD)	2,453	9.19	New	2	+2
United Left/The Greens–Assembly for Andalusia (IULV–CA)	2,162	8.10	+4.85	2	+2
Blank ballots	619	2.32	+0.84		
Total	26,700			25	±0
Valid votes	26,700	99.01	−0.65		
Invalid votes	267	0.99	+0.65		
Votes cast / turnout	26,967	60.62	+3.29		
Abstentions	17,520	39.38	−3.29		
Registered voters	44,487				

=== El Puerto de Santa María ===
Population: 88,503

← Summary of the 22 May 2011 City Council of El Puerto de Santa María election results →
Parties and alliances	Popular vote			Seats	
Parties and alliances	Votes	%	±pp	Total	+/−
People's Party (PP)	13,440	37.95	−0.96	11	±0
Andalusian Party–Andalusian Plural Space (PA–EPAnd)^{1}	6,104	17.24	+10.52	4	+3
Spanish Socialist Workers' Party of Andalusia (PSOE–A)	4,886	13.80	−4.53	4	−1
United Left/The Greens–Assembly for Andalusia (IULV–CA)	4,639	13.10	−1.99	3	−1
Portuese Independents (IP)	4,051	11.44	−4.78	3	−1
Union, Progress and Democracy (UPyD)	1,144	3.23	New	0	±0
Participatory Democracy (Participa)	233	0.66	New	0	±0
Blank ballots	915	2.58	+1.15		
Total	35,412			25	±0
Valid votes	35,412	98.80	−0.80		
Invalid votes	431	1.20	+0.80		
Votes cast / turnout	35,843	53.41	+6.35		
Abstentions	31,266	46.59	−6.35		
Registered voters	67,109				
Sources
Footnotes: ^{1} Andalusian Party–Andalusian Plural Space results are compared to the combined totals of Andalusian Party and Socialist Party of Andalusia in the 2007 election.

=== Fuengirola ===
Population: 71,783

← Summary of the 22 May 2011 City Council of Fuengirola election results →
Parties and alliances	Popular vote			Seats	
Parties and alliances	Votes	%	±pp	Total	+/−
People's Party (PP)	16,015	64.48	+6.50	18	+2
Spanish Socialist Workers' Party of Andalusia (PSOE–A)	5,032	20.26	−7.90	5	−3
United Left/The Greens–Assembly for Andalusia (IULV–CA)	2,122	8.54	+4.14	2	+2
Andalusian Party–Andalusian Plural Space (PA–EPAnd)	850	3.42	−3.20	0	−1
Participatory Democracy (Participa)	330	1.33	New	0	±0
Blank ballots	487	1.96	+1.00		
Total	24,836			25	±0
Valid votes	24,836	98.78	−0.86		
Invalid votes	308	1.22	+0.86		
Votes cast / turnout	25,144	58.33	+1.67		
Abstentions	17,960	41.67	−1.67		
Registered voters	43,104				

=== Granada ===
Population: 239,154

← Summary of the 22 May 2011 City Council of Granada election results →
Parties and alliances	Popular vote			Seats	
Parties and alliances	Votes	%	±pp	Total	+/−
People's Party (PP)	60,519	51.87	−1.46	16	±0
Spanish Socialist Workers' Party of Andalusia (PSOE–A)	31,736	27.20	−5.70	8	−1
United Left/The Greens–Assembly for Andalusia (IULV–CA)	9,106	7.80	−0.22	2	±0
Union, Progress and Democracy (UPyD)	6,242	5.35	New	1	+1
The Greens–Ecological Andalusia (LV–AE)	3,071	2.63	+0.58	0	±0
Andalusian Party–Andalusian Plural Space (PA–EPAnd)^{1}	1,065	0.91	−0.89	0	±0
Regionalist Party for Eastern Andalusia (PRAO)	664	0.57	New	0	±0
For a Fairer World (PUM+J)	365	0.31	New	0	±0
Appeal of Exit, In Rupture with Capitalism (IzAn)	343	0.29	New	0	±0
Participatory Democracy (Participa)	249	0.21	New	0	±0
Spanish Phalanx of the CNSO (FE de las JONS)	205	0.18	New	0	±0
Communist Unification of Spain (UCE)	92	0.08	New	0	±0
Spain 2000 (E–2000)	74	0.06	−0.02	0	±0
Blank ballots	2,947	2.53	+1.11		
Total	116,678			27	±0
Valid votes	116,678	98.42	−1.15		
Invalid votes	1,873	1.58	+1.15		
Votes cast / turnout	118,551	63.07	+6.27		
Abstentions	69,426	36.93	−6.27		
Registered voters	187,977				
Sources
Footnotes: ^{1} Andalusian Party–Andalusian Plural Space results are compared to the combined totals of Andalusian Party and Socialist Party of Andalusia in the 2007 election.

=== Huelva ===
Population: 149,310

← Summary of the 22 May 2011 City Council of Huelva election results →
Parties and alliances	Popular vote			Seats	
Parties and alliances	Votes	%	±pp	Total	+/−
People's Party (PP)	28,428	45.33	−5.78	14	−1
Spanish Socialist Workers' Party of Andalusia (PSOE–A)	19,099	30.46	−6.44	9	−1
United Left/The Greens–Assembly for Andalusia (IULV–CA)	6,314	10.07	+2.70	3	+1
Huelva Estuary Board (MRH)	3,364	5.36	New	1	+1
Andalusian Party–Andalusian Plural Space (PA–EPAnd)^{1}	1,874	2.99	+1.25	0	±0
Union, Progress and Democracy (UPyD)	1,208	1.93	New	0	±0
The Greens–Ecological Andalusia (LV–AE)	595	0.95	−0.18	0	±0
National Democracy (DN)	288	0.46	+0.29	0	±0
Blank ballots	1,540	2.46	+1.14		
Total	62,710			27	±0
Valid votes	62,710	98.75	−0.88		
Invalid votes	796	1.25	+0.88		
Votes cast / turnout	63,506	55.67	+3.43		
Abstentions	50,565	44.33	−3.43		
Registered voters	114,071				
Sources
Footnotes: ^{1} Andalusian Party–Andalusian Plural Space results are compared to the combined totals of Andalusian Party and Socialist Party of Andalusia in the 2007 election.

=== Jaén ===
Population: 116,790

← Summary of the 22 May 2011 City Council of Jaén election results →
Parties and alliances	Popular vote			Seats	
Parties and alliances	Votes	%	±pp	Total	+/−
People's Party (PP)	32,224	51.75	+6.34	16	+3
Spanish Socialist Workers' Party of Andalusia (PSOE–A)	21,826	35.05	−7.75	10	−2
United Left/The Greens–Assembly for Andalusia (IULV–CA)	3,699	5.94	−0.73	1	−1
Union, Progress and Democracy (UPyD)	1,982	3.18	New	0	±0
Andalusian Party–Andalusian Plural Space (PA–EPAnd)^{1}	830	1.33	−1.67	0	±0
Communist Party of the Peoples of Spain (PCPE)	283	0.45	New	0	±0
Blank ballots	1,420	2.28	+1.09		
Total	62,264			27	±0
Valid votes	62,264	98.73	−0.95		
Invalid votes	798	1.27	+0.95		
Votes cast / turnout	63,062	69.24	+5.13		
Abstentions	28,010	30.76	−5.13		
Registered voters	91,072				
Sources
Footnotes: ^{1} Andalusian Party–Andalusian Plural Space results are compared to the combined totals of Andalusian Party and Socialist Party of Andalusia in the 2007 election.

=== Jerez de la Frontera ===
Population: 208,896

← Summary of the 22 May 2011 City Council of Jerez de la Frontera election results →
Parties and alliances	Popular vote			Seats	
Parties and alliances	Votes	%	±pp	Total	+/−
People's Party (PP)	45,667	46.56	+20.76	15	+8
Spanish Socialist Workers' Party of Andalusia (PSOE–A)	14,358	14.64	−36.39	5	−10
Citizen Forum of Jerez (FCJ)	13,763	14.03	New	4	+4
United Left/The Greens–Assembly for Andalusia (IULV–CA)	11,272	11.49	+5.70	3	+2
Socialist Party of Andalusia–Andalusian Plural Space (PSA–EPAnd)^{1}	3,941	4.02	−10.91	0	−4
Union, Progress and Democracy (UPyD)	2,992	3.05	New	0	±0
Jerezan Rural Union (URJ)	1,265	1.29	New	0	±0
Jerezan Progressive Initiative (IPJ)	1,007	1.03	New	0	±0
Jerezan Union Bases (BUX)	654	0.67	New	0	±0
United Barquese Independent Party (PIBBUU)	516	0.53	New	0	±0
Communist Party of the Peoples of Spain (PCPE)	331	0.34	New	0	±0
Blank ballots	2,324	2.37	+1.08		
Total	98,090			27	±0
Valid votes	98,090	98.94	−0.79		
Invalid votes	1,047	1.06	+0.79		
Votes cast / turnout	99,137	60.64	+3.29		
Abstentions	64,343	39.36	−3.29		
Registered voters	163,480				
Sources
Footnotes: ^{1} Socialist Party of Andalusia–Andalusian Plural Space results are compared to the combined totals of Socialist Party of Andalusia and Andalusian Party in the 2007 election.

=== La Línea de la Concepción ===
Population: 64,645

← Summary of the 22 May 2011 City Council of La Línea de la Concepción election results →
Parties and alliances	Popular vote			Seats	
Parties and alliances	Votes	%	±pp	Total	+/−
People's Party (PP)	10,409	40.93	−10.80	11	−4
Spanish Socialist Workers' Party of Andalusia (PSOE–A)	8,930	35.11	+4.18	10	+2
United Left/The Greens–Assembly for Andalusia (IULV–CA)	2,246	8.83	+3.03	2	+1
Andalusian Party–Andalusian Plural Space (PA–EPAnd)^{1}	2,193	8.62	+3.56	2	+2
Unity for La Línea (UPL)	1,064	4.18	−1.23	0	−1
Blank ballots	590	2.32	+1.24		
Total	25,432			25	±0
Valid votes	25,432	98.86	−0.83		
Invalid votes	293	1.14	+0.83		
Votes cast / turnout	25,725	52.59	−0.50		
Abstentions	23,193	47.41	+0.50		
Registered voters	48,918				
Sources
Footnotes: ^{1} Andalusian Party–Andalusian Plural Space results are compared to the combined totals of Andalusian Party and Socialist Party of Andalusia in the 2007 election.

=== Linares ===
Population: 61,306

← Summary of the 22 May 2011 City Council of Linares election results →
Parties and alliances	Popular vote			Seats	
Parties and alliances	Votes	%	±pp	Total	+/−
Spanish Socialist Workers' Party of Andalusia (PSOE–A)	11,634	40.80	−15.32	11	−5
People's Party (PP)	11,412	40.02	+12.08	11	+4
United Left/The Greens–Assembly for Andalusia (IULV–CA)	3,132	10.98	+2.34	3	+1
Union, Progress and Democracy (UPyD)	1,169	4.10	New	0	±0
Andalusian Party–Andalusian Plural Space (PA–EPAnd)^{1}	526	1.84	+0.33	0	±0
Blank ballots	642	2.25	+0.92		
Total	28,515			25	±0
Valid votes	28,515	98.64	+0.12		
Invalid votes	393	1.36	−0.12		
Votes cast / turnout	28,908	60.13	+4.06		
Abstentions	19,165	39.87	−4.06		
Registered voters	48,073				
Sources
Footnotes: ^{1} Andalusian Party–Andalusian Plural Space results are compared to Andalusian Party totals in the 2007 election.

=== Málaga ===
Population: 568,507

← Summary of the 22 May 2011 City Council of Málaga election results →
Parties and alliances	Popular vote			Seats	
Parties and alliances	Votes	%	±pp	Total	+/−
People's Party (PP)	123,655	53.46	+2.43	19	+2
Spanish Socialist Workers' Party of Andalusia (PSOE–A)	57,245	24.75	−11.53	9	−3
United Left/The Greens–Assembly for Andalusia (IULV–CA)	25,354	10.96	+3.75	3	+1
Union, Progress and Democracy (UPyD)	8,099	3.50	New	0	±0
The Greens–Ecological Andalusia (LV–AE)	3,197	1.38	+0.09	0	±0
Green Commitment for Málaga–Andalusian Plural Space (cvM–EPAnd)^{1}	1,514	0.65	−1.36	0	±0
Citizens for Blank Votes (CenB)	1,431	0.62	New	0	±0
Anti-Bullfighting Party Against Mistreatment of Animals (PACMA)	1,098	0.47	+0.13	0	±0
Citizens–Party of the Citizenry (C's)	722	0.31	New	0	±0
Pirate Party (Pirata)	718	0.31	New	0	±0
Pensioners in Action Party (PDLPEA)	534	0.23	New	0	±0
Participatory Democracy (Participa)	533	0.23	New	0	±0
Communist Party of the Peoples of Spain (PCPE)	428	0.19	New	0	±0
National Alliance (AN)	375	0.16	+0.08	0	±0
Spanish Phalanx of the CNSO (FE de las JONS)	301	0.13	New	0	±0
Humanist Party (PH)	279	0.12	+0.03	0	±0
Internationalist Solidarity and Self-Management (SAIn)	260	0.11	New	0	±0
Communist Unification of Spain (UCE)	102	0.04	New	0	±0
Blank ballots	5,443	2.35	+1.14		
Total	231,288			31	±0
Valid votes	231,288	98.90	−0.81		
Invalid votes	2,569	1.10	+0.81		
Votes cast / turnout	233,857	55.59	+5.42		
Abstentions	186,815	44.41	−5.42		
Registered voters	420,672				
Sources
Footnotes: ^{1} Green Commitment for Málaga–Andalusian Plural Space results are compared to the combined totals of Andalusian Party and Socialist Party of Andalusia in the 2007 election.

=== Marbella ===
Population: 136,322

← Summary of the 22 May 2011 City Council of Marbella election results →
Parties and alliances	Popular vote			Seats	
Parties and alliances	Votes	%	±pp	Total	+/−
People's Party (PP)	23,040	50.08	+0.37	15	−1
Spanish Socialist Workers' Party of Andalusia (PSOE–A)	11,572	25.15	−7.69	7	−3
San Pedro Option (OSP)	4,512	9.81	+5.38	3	+3
United Left/The Greens–Assembly for Andalusia (IULV–CA)	3,540	7.70	+1.52	2	+1
Union, Progress and Democracy (UPyD)	863	1.88	New	0	±0
Marbella+San Pedro Initiative–The Greens Ecological Andalusia (IM+S–LVAE)	725	1.58	New	0	±0
Andalusian Democratic Centre (CD–Andaluz)	654	1.42	New	0	±0
Party of the South (PASUR)	80	0.17	+0.08	0	±0
Blank ballots	1,017	2.21	+0.66		
Total	46,003			27	±0
Valid votes	46,003	98.68	−0.88		
Invalid votes	614	1.32	+0.88		
Votes cast / turnout	46,617	54.90	−4.61		
Abstentions	38,300	45.10	+4.61		
Registered voters	84,917				

=== Mijas ===
Population: 76,362

← Summary of the 22 May 2011 City Council of Mijas election results →
Parties and alliances	Popular vote			Seats	
Parties and alliances	Votes	%	±pp	Total	+/−
People's Party (PP)	11,206	49.96	+13.26	15	+4
Spanish Socialist Workers' Party of Andalusia (PSOE–A)	5,631	25.10	−21.63	7	−7
Independent Group of Mijas (GIM Mijas)	1,530	6.82	+1.88	2	+2
Mijenian Alternative–The Greens Ecological Andalusia (AM+LVAE)^{1}	1,188	5.30	+2.82	1	+1
Andalusian Party–Andalusian Plural Space (PA–EPAnd)	962	4.29	+0.97	0	±0
United Left/The Greens–Assembly for Andalusia (IULV–CA)	881	3.93	−0.73	0	±0
Union, Progress and Democracy (UPyD)	681	3.04	New	0	±0
Blank ballots	352	1.57	+0.39		
Total	22,431			25	±0
Valid votes	22,431	98.92	−0.76		
Invalid votes	245	1.08	+0.76		
Votes cast / turnout	22,676	58.95	+4.80		
Abstentions	15,788	41.05	−4.80		
Registered voters	38,464				
Sources
Footnotes: ^{1} Mijenian Alternative–The Greens Ecological Andalusia results are compared to The Greens 2007 in the 2007 election.

=== Morón de la Frontera ===
Population: 28,467

← Summary of the 22 May 2011 City Council of Morón de la Frontera election results →
Parties and alliances	Popular vote			Seats	
Parties and alliances	Votes	%	±pp	Total	+/−
Spanish Socialist Workers' Party of Andalusia (PSOE–A)	6,541	46.10	+17.34	10	+4
People's Party (PP)	3,969	27.97	−27.55	6	−7
Alternative Moroneran Assembly (AMA–Morón)	1,900	13.39	New	3	+3
United Left/The Greens–Assembly for Andalusia (IULV–CA)	1,481	10.44	−1.66	2	±0
Blank ballots	299	2.11	+0.63		
Total	14,190			21	±0
Valid votes	14,190	98.22	−1.32		
Invalid votes	257	1.78	+1.32		
Votes cast / turnout	14,447	62.70	−3.46		
Abstentions	8,595	37.30	+3.46		
Registered voters	23,042				

=== Motril ===
Population: 60,884

← Summary of the 22 May 2011 City Council of Motril election results →
Parties and alliances	Popular vote			Seats	
Parties and alliances	Votes	%	±pp	Total	+/−
People's Party (PP)	12,454	45.93	+4.03	13	+1
Spanish Socialist Workers' Party of Andalusia (PSOE–A)	5,380	19.84	−14.98	5	−4
Andalusian Party–Andalusian Plural Space (PA–EPAnd)	2,703	9.97	+1.70	3	+1
United Left/The Greens–Assembly for Andalusia (IULV–CA)	2,649	9.77	+1.77	2	±0
Andalusian Convergence (CAnda)	1,879	6.93	+6.65	2	+2
Independent Group for the Municipal Autonomy of Torrenueva (GRITO)	947	3.49	−1.27	0	±0
Union, Progress and Democracy (UPyD)	448	1.65	New	0	±0
The Greens–Ecological Andalusia (LV–AE)	136	0.50	+0.20	0	±0
Independent Electors' Group of Carchuna–Calahonda (ALEI)	0	0.00	New	0	±0
Blank ballots	518	1.91	+0.92		
Total	27,114			25	±0
Valid votes	27,114	98.85	−0.75		
Invalid votes	316	1.15	+0.75		
Votes cast / turnout	27,430	63.31	+2.24		
Abstentions	15,898	36.69	−2.24		
Registered voters	43,328				

=== Ronda ===
Population: 36,909

← Summary of the 22 May 2011 City Council of Ronda election results →
Parties and alliances	Popular vote			Seats	
Parties and alliances	Votes	%	±pp	Total	+/−
Spanish Socialist Workers' Party of Andalusia (PSOE–A)	5,581	30.08	±0.00	7	±0
People's Party (PP)	5,406	29.14	+11.19	7	+3
Andalusian Party–Andalusian Plural Space (PA–EPAnd)	4,600	24.79	−15.35	5	−4
United Left/The Greens–Assembly for Andalusia (IULV–CA)	1,749	9.43	+3.48	2	+1
Union, Progress and Democracy (UPyD)	615	3.31	New	0	±0
The Greens–Ecological Andalusia (LV–AE)	191	1.03	−1.28	0	±0
Blank ballots	412	2.22	+0.35		
Total	18,554			21	±0
Valid votes	18,554	98.42	−0.87		
Invalid votes	297	1.58	+0.87		
Votes cast / turnout	18,851	65.42	+3.59		
Abstentions	9,965	34.58	−3.59		
Registered voters	28,816				

=== Roquetas de Mar ===
Population: 85,808

← Summary of the 22 May 2011 City Council of Roquetas de Mar election results →
Parties and alliances	Popular vote			Seats	
Parties and alliances	Votes	%	±pp	Total	+/−
People's Party (PP)	14,804	58.93	+2.34	16	−1
Spanish Socialist Workers' Party of Andalusia (PSOE–A)	4,569	18.19	−6.36	5	−2
United Left/The Greens–Assembly for Andalusia (IULV–CA)	2,801	11.15	+6.59	3	+3
Independents of Aguadulce and El Parador (INDAPA)	1,419	5.65	−0.59	1	±0
Union, Progress and Democracy (UPyD)	894	3.56	New	0	±0
Blank ballots	633	2.52	+1.24		
Total	25,120			25	±0
Valid votes	25,120	98.95	−0.83		
Invalid votes	266	1.05	+0.83		
Votes cast / turnout	25,386	54.61	+0.76		
Abstentions	21,098	45.39	−0.76		
Registered voters	46,484				

=== San Fernando ===
Population: 96,689

← Summary of the 22 May 2011 City Council of San Fernando election results →
Parties and alliances	Popular vote			Seats	
Parties and alliances	Votes	%	±pp	Total	+/−
People's Party (PP)	14,128	34.95	+6.86	10	+2
Spanish Socialist Workers' Party of Andalusia (PSOE–A)	13,741	34.00	+2.38	9	±0
Andalusian Party–Andalusian Plural Space (PA–EPAnd)^{1}	4,591	11.36	−21.37	3	−5
Citizens for San Fernando (CxSF)	2,962	7.33	New	2	+2
United Left/The Greens–Assembly for Andalusia (IULV–CA)	2,138	5.29	+1.89	1	+1
Union, Progress and Democracy (UPyD)	1,828	4.52	New	0	±0
Blank ballots	1,030	2.55	+1.08		
Total	40,418			25	±0
Valid votes	40,418	98.92	−0.67		
Invalid votes	443	1.08	+0.67		
Votes cast / turnout	40,861	53.56	+7.10		
Abstentions	35,428	46.44	−7.10		
Registered voters	76,289				
Sources
Footnotes: ^{1} Andalusian Party–Andalusian Plural Space results are compared to the combined totals of Andalusian Party and Socialist Party of Andalusia in the 2007 election.

=== Sanlúcar de Barrameda ===
Population: 66,541

← Summary of the 22 May 2011 City Council of Sanlúcar de Barrameda election results →
Parties and alliances	Popular vote			Seats	
Parties and alliances	Votes	%	±pp	Total	+/−
Spanish Socialist Workers' Party of Andalusia (PSOE–A)	9,855	37.15	−0.69	10	−1
People's Party (PP)	6,541	24.66	+6.44	7	+2
United Left/The Greens–Assembly for Andalusia (IULV–CA)	3,491	13.16	+7.87	3	+2
Independent Citizens of Sanlúcar (CIS)	2,828	10.66	−2.16	3	±0
Andalusian Party–Andalusian Plural Space (PA–EPAnd)^{1}	2,161	8.15	−9.27	2	−2
Everyone for Sanlúcar (TPS)	1,005	3.79	New	0	±0
Sanluquenian Alternative (AS)	n/a	n/a	−5.16	0	−1
Blank ballots	648	2.44	+1.15		
Total	26,529			25	±0
Valid votes	26,529	98.95	−0.71		
Invalid votes	281	1.05	+0.71		
Votes cast / turnout	26,810	50.50	−8.71		
Abstentions	26,279	49.50	+8.71		
Registered voters	53,089				
Sources
Footnotes: ^{1} Andalusian Party–Andalusian Plural Space results are compared to the combined totals of Andalusian Party and Socialist Party of Andalusia in the 2007 election.

=== Seville ===
Population: 704,198

=== Utrera ===
Population: 51,177

← Summary of the 22 May 2011 City Council of Utrera election results →
Parties and alliances	Popular vote			Seats	
Parties and alliances	Votes	%	±pp	Total	+/−
Spanish Socialist Workers' Party of Andalusia (PSOE–A)	8,392	34.88	−3.06	10	+2
Andalusian Party–Andalusian Plural Space (PA–EPAnd)	7,995	33.23	−15.66	9	−2
People's Party (PP)	3,700	15.38	+6.88	4	+2
United Left/The Greens–Assembly for Andalusia (IULV–CA)	1,615	6.71	+3.23	1	+1
Union, Progress and Democracy (UPyD)	1,307	5.43	New	1	+1
Independent Group Pro-City Council of El Palmar de Troya (GIP)	565	2.35	New	0	±0
Blank ballots	487	2.02	+0.82		
Total	24,061			25	+4
Valid votes	24,061	99.13	−0.61		
Invalid votes	212	0.87	+0.61		
Votes cast / turnout	24,273	60.77	−0.05		
Abstentions	15,669	39.23	+0.05		
Registered voters	39,942				

=== Vélez-Málaga ===
Population: 75,623

← Summary of the 22 May 2011 City Council of Vélez-Málaga election results →
Parties and alliances	Popular vote			Seats	
Parties and alliances	Votes	%	±pp	Total	+/−
People's Party (PP)	16,920	46.74	+13.94	13	+3
Spanish Socialist Workers' Party of Andalusia (PSOE–A)	7,550	20.86	−10.82	6	−3
Andalusian Party–Andalusian Plural Space (PA–EPAnd)^{1}	3,423	9.46	+2.12	2	+1
United Left/The Greens–Assembly for Andalusia (IULV–CA)	2,767	7.64	−1.59	2	±0
Pro-Torre del Mar Municipality Independent Group (GIPMTM)	2,691	7.43	−2.92	2	−1
Union, Progress and Democracy (UPyD)	988	2.73	New	0	±0
Alternative for Autonomous Local Entities (AELA)	523	1.44	New	0	±0
Axarquía Management Group (GGA)	251	0.69	New	0	±0
Citizen Union for Democracy (UCiD)	182	0.50	New	0	±0
Torrenian Group (CCDC)	148	0.41	New	0	±0
Blank ballots	759	2.10	+0.93		
Total	36,202			25	±0
Valid votes	36,202	98.53	−0.92		
Invalid votes	540	1.47	+0.92		
Votes cast / turnout	36,742	66.98	+4.99		
Abstentions	18,114	33.02	−4.99		
Registered voters	54,856				
Sources
Footnotes: ^{1} Andalusian Party–Andalusian Plural Space results are compared to the combined totals of Andalusian Party and Socialist Party of Andalusia in the 2007 election.
