= 2007 Spanish local elections in Andalusia =

This article presents the results breakdown of the local elections held in Andalusia on 27 May 2007. The following tables show detailed results in the autonomous community's most populous municipalities, sorted alphabetically.

== City control ==
The following table lists party control in the most populous municipalities, including provincial capitals (shown in bold). Gains for a party are displayed with the cell's background shaded in that party's colour.

Municipality	Population	Previous control	New control
Alcalá de Guadaíra	64,990	Spanish Socialist Workers' Party of Andalusia (PSOE–A)	Spanish Socialist Workers' Party of Andalusia (PSOE–A)
Algeciras	112,937	Spanish Socialist Workers' Party of Andalusia (PSOE–A)	Spanish Socialist Workers' Party of Andalusia (PSOE–A)
**Almería**	185,309	People's Party (PP)	People's Party (PP)
Antequera	44,032	Spanish Socialist Workers' Party of Andalusia (PSOE–A)	Spanish Socialist Workers' Party of Andalusia (PSOE–A)
Benalmádena	50,298	Independent Group of Benalmádena (GIB–BOLIN)	Spanish Socialist Workers' Party of Andalusia (PSOE–A) (PP in 2009)
**Cádiz**	130,561	People's Party (PP)	People's Party (PP)
Chiclana de la Frontera	72,364	Spanish Socialist Workers' Party of Andalusia (PSOE–A)	People's Party (PP) (PSOE–A in 2008)
**Córdoba**	322,867	United Left/The Greens–Assembly for Andalusia (IULV–CA)	United Left/The Greens–Assembly for Andalusia (IULV–CA)
Dos Hermanas	114,672	Spanish Socialist Workers' Party of Andalusia (PSOE–A)	Spanish Socialist Workers' Party of Andalusia (PSOE–A)
Écija	39,295	Spanish Socialist Workers' Party of Andalusia (PSOE–A)	Spanish Socialist Workers' Party of Andalusia (PSOE–A)
El Ejido	75,969	Party of Almería (PdeAL)	Party of Almería (PdeAL)
El Puerto de Santa María	83,101	Portuese Independents (IP)	People's Party (PP)
Fuengirola	63,899	People's Party (PP)	People's Party (PP)
**Granada**	237,929	People's Party (PP)	People's Party (PP)
**Huelva**	145,763	People's Party (PP)	People's Party (PP)
**Jaén**	116,769	People's Party (PP)	Spanish Socialist Workers' Party of Andalusia (PSOE–A)
Jerez de la Frontera	199,544	Spanish Socialist Workers' Party of Andalusia (PSOE–A)	Spanish Socialist Workers' Party of Andalusia (PSOE–A)
La Línea de la Concepción	63,026	People's Party (PP)	People's Party (PP)
Linares	61,452	Spanish Socialist Workers' Party of Andalusia (PSOE–A)	Spanish Socialist Workers' Party of Andalusia (PSOE–A)
**Málaga**	560,631	People's Party (PP)	People's Party (PP)
Marbella	125,519	Caretaker government	People's Party (PP)
Morón de la Frontera	28,295	People's Party (PP)	People's Party (PP)
Motril	57,895	Spanish Socialist Workers' Party of Andalusia (PSOE–A)	People's Party (PP)
Ronda	35,836	Spanish Socialist Workers' Party of Andalusia (PSOE–A)	Andalusian Party (PA) (PSOE–A in 2009)
San Fernando	93,544	Andalusian Party (PA)	Andalusian Party (PA)
Sanlúcar de Barrameda	63,509	People's Party (PP)	Spanish Socialist Workers' Party of Andalusia (PSOE–A)
**Seville**	704,414	Spanish Socialist Workers' Party of Andalusia (PSOE–A)	Spanish Socialist Workers' Party of Andalusia (PSOE–A)
Utrera	48,222	Andalusian Party (PA)	Andalusian Party (PA)
Vélez-Málaga	67,697	Spanish Socialist Workers' Party of Andalusia (PSOE–A)	People's Party (PP) (PSOE–A in 2008)

== Municipalities ==
=== Alcalá de Guadaíra ===
Population: 64,990

← Summary of the 27 May 2007 City Council of Alcalá de Guadaíra election results →
Parties and alliances	Popular vote			Seats	
Parties and alliances	Votes	%	±pp	Total	+/−
Spanish Socialist Workers' Party of Andalusia (PSOE–A)	15,336	62.28	+1.49	18	+1
People's Party (PP)	5,066	20.57	+0.15	5	±0
Andalusian Party (PA)	1,635	6.64	+0.74	1	±0
United Left/The Greens–Assembly for Andalusia (IULV–CA)	1,442	5.86	−4.57	1	−1
The Greens 2007 (LV2007)	642	2.61	New	0	±0
Blank ballots	505	2.05	−0.41		
Total	24,626			25	±0
Valid votes	24,626	99.50	+0.14		
Invalid votes	123	0.50	−0.14		
Votes cast / turnout	24,749	47.47	−7.09		
Abstentions	27,388	52.53	+7.09		
Registered voters	52,137				

=== Algeciras ===
Population: 112,937

← Summary of the 27 May 2007 City Council of Algeciras election results →
Parties and alliances	Popular vote			Seats	
Parties and alliances	Votes	%	±pp	Total	+/−
Spanish Socialist Workers' Party of Andalusia (PSOE–A)	14,739	38.20	+6.11	13	+3
People's Party (PP)	11,136	28.86	+5.79	10	+3
United Left/The Greens–Assembly for Andalusia (IULV–CA)	4,287	11.11	−0.79	4	+1
Andalusian Party (PA)	1,896	4.91	−18.53	0	−7
Unity for Algeciras (UP Algeciras)	1,610	4.17	New	0	±0
Renewal Party (PRNV)	1,227	3.18	New	0	±0
Andalusian Convergence (CAnda)	832	2.16	New	0	±0
Algeciran Progressive Special Party (PEPA)	684	1.77	New	0	±0
Independents for Algeciras (IPAL)	584	1.51	New	0	±0
Independent Democratic Party (PDI)	471	1.22	New	0	±0
Socialist Party of Andalusia (PSA)	306	0.79	−1.16	0	±0
The Greens 2007 (LV2007)	199	0.52	New	0	±0
Democratic and Social Centre (CDS)	65	0.17	New	0	±0
Blank ballots	545	1.41	−0.17		
Total	38,581			27	±0
Valid votes	38,581	99.51	−0.05		
Invalid votes	190	0.49	+0.05		
Votes cast / turnout	38,771	45.00	−4.64		
Abstentions	47,396	55.00	+4.64		
Registered voters	86,167				

=== Almería ===
Population: 185,309

← Summary of the 27 May 2007 City Council of Almería election results →
Parties and alliances	Popular vote			Seats	
Parties and alliances	Votes	%	±pp	Total	+/−
People's Party (PP)	32,725	45.52	+7.16	13	+2
Spanish Socialist Workers' Party of Andalusia (PSOE–A)	26,465	36.81	+4.52	11	+1
Independent Group for Almería (GIAL)	5,068	7.05	−9.81	2	−3
United Left/The Greens–Assembly for Andalusia (IULV–CA)	3,756	5.22	−0.71	1	±0
Andalusian Party (PA)	1,004	1.40	−1.05	0	±0
The Greens 2007 (LV2007)	770	1.07	+0.22	0	±0
Party of Almería (PdeAL)	751	1.04	New	0	±0
Socialist Party of Andalusia (PSA)	275	0.38	−0.08	0	±0
Humanist Party (PH)	86	0.12	+0.04	0	±0
Blank ballots	994	1.38	−0.02		
Total	71,894			27	±0
Valid votes	71,894	99.68	−0.03		
Invalid votes	233	0.32	+0.03		
Votes cast / turnout	72,127	51.74	−10.07		
Abstentions	67,272	48.26	+10.07		
Registered voters	139,399				

=== Antequera ===
Population: 44,032

← Summary of the 27 May 2007 City Council of Antequera election results →
Parties and alliances	Popular vote			Seats	
Parties and alliances	Votes	%	±pp	Total	+/−
Spanish Socialist Workers' Party of Andalusia (PSOE–A)	8,220	39.66	−8.44	10	−1
People's Party (PP)	6,047	29.18	−0.09	7	+1
United Left/The Greens–Assembly for Andalusia (IULV–CA)	3,110	15.01	+4.20	3	+1
Party of the Annexes and the Neighbourhoods of Antequera (PABA)	1,304	6.29	New	1	+1
Andalusian Forum–Citizens for Andalusia (FA)	894	4.31	New	0	±0
Andalusian Party (PA)	440	2.12	−7.76	0	−2
Independent Group for Villanueva de la Concepción (GIVC)	273	1.32	New	0	±0
Socialist Party of Andalusia (PSA)	192	0.93	−0.11	0	±0
Blank ballots	245	1.18	+0.28		
Total	20,725			21	±0
Valid votes	20,725	99.64	+0.18		
Invalid votes	74	0.36	−0.18		
Votes cast / turnout	20,799	61.57	−1.97		
Abstentions	12,981	38.43	+1.97		
Registered voters	33,780				

=== Benalmádena ===
Population: 50,298

← Summary of the 27 May 2007 City Council of Benalmádena election results →
Parties and alliances	Popular vote			Seats	
Parties and alliances	Votes	%	±pp	Total	+/−
Spanish Socialist Workers' Party of Andalusia (PSOE–A)	4,494	25.80	+6.12	7	+2
Independent Group of Benalmádena (GIB–BOLIN)	3,308	18.99	−22.64	5	−5
People's Party (PP)	2,925	16.79	−2.86	4	±0
Movement for Benalmádena (MpB)	2,632	15.11	New	4	+4
United Left/The Greens–Assembly for Andalusia (IULV–CA)	1,851	10.63	+1.53	3	+1
Democratic Initiative for Benalmádena (IDB)	1,414	8.12	New	2	+2
Andalusian Convergence–Ecologist Greens of Benalmádena (CA–VEB)	358	2.06	−0.69	0	±0
Socialist Party of Andalusia (PSA)	135	0.77	+0.29	0	±0
Andalusian Party (PA)	92	0.53	−2.64	0	±0
Blank ballots	211	1.21	−0.36		
Total	17,420			25	+4
Valid votes	17,420	99.63	+0.06		
Invalid votes	65	0.37	−0.06		
Votes cast / turnout	17,485	54.50	−1.50		
Abstentions	14,598	45.50	+1.50		
Registered voters	32,083				

=== Cádiz ===
Population: 130,561

← Summary of the 27 May 2007 City Council of Cádiz election results →
Parties and alliances	Popular vote			Seats	
Parties and alliances	Votes	%	±pp	Total	+/−
People's Party (PP)	33,910	59.77	−0.32	18	±0
Spanish Socialist Workers' Party of Andalusia (PSOE–A)	15,524	27.36	−1.30	8	±0
United Left/The Greens–Assembly for Andalusia (IULV–CA)	3,764	6.63	+1.17	1	±0
Andalusian Party (PA)	1,404	2.47	+0.43	0	±0
The Greens (LV)	604	1.06	−0.45	0	±0
Socialist Party of Andalusia (PSA)	457	0.81	+0.13	0	±0
Liberal Democratic Centre (CDL)	228	0.40	New	0	±0
Spanish Phalanx of the CNSO (FE de las JONS)	92	0.16	New	0	±0
Humanist Party (PH)	84	0.15	New	0	±0
Blank ballots	664	1.17	−0.39		
Total	56,731			27	±0
Valid votes	56,731	99.49	−0.04		
Invalid votes	289	0.51	+0.04		
Votes cast / turnout	57,020	51.60	−7.50		
Abstentions	53,490	48.40	+7.50		
Registered voters	110,510				

=== Chiclana de la Frontera ===
Population: 72,364

← Summary of the 27 May 2007 City Council of Chiclana de la Frontera election results →
Parties and alliances	Popular vote			Seats	
Parties and alliances	Votes	%	±pp	Total	+/−
Spanish Socialist Workers' Party of Andalusia (PSOE–A)	9,627	39.67	−18.37	11	−5
People's Party (PP)	6,569	27.07	+5.13	8	+2
United Left/The Greens–Assembly for Andalusia (IULV–CA)	2,675	11.02	+5.65	3	+2
Andalusian Party (PA)	2,332	9.61	+6.28	2	+2
Socialist Party of Andalusia (PSA)	1,462	6.02	−2.18	1	−1
Liberal Democratic Centre (CDL)	430	1.77	New	0	±0
Defense of the Andalusian People's Interests (DIPA)	402	1.66	New	0	±0
Party of Spanish Self-employed (PAUTE)	310	1.28	New	0	±0
Integrate Chiclana (IChi)	111	0.46	New	0	±0
Blank ballots	348	1.43	+0.08		
Total	24,266			25	±0
Valid votes	24,266	99.77	+0.07		
Invalid votes	55	0.23	−0.07		
Votes cast / turnout	24,321	43.64	−1.98		
Abstentions	31,411	56.36	+1.98		
Registered voters	55,732				

=== Córdoba ===
Population: 322,867

← Summary of the 27 May 2007 City Council of Córdoba election results →
Parties and alliances	Popular vote			Seats	
Parties and alliances	Votes	%	±pp	Total	+/−
People's Party (PP)	64,094	43.96	+4.38	14	+2
United Left/The Greens–Assembly for Andalusia (IULV–CA)	51,982	35.66	−6.22	11	−2
Spanish Socialist Workers' Party of Andalusia (PSOE–A)	21,974	15.07	+2.20	4	±0
Andalusian Party (PA)	1,888	1.30	−0.71	0	±0
The Greens 2007 (LV2007)	1,653	1.13	+0.21	0	±0
Socialist Party of Andalusia (PSA)	950	0.65	+0.36	0	±0
Andalusian Forum–Citizens for Andalusia (FA)	390	0.27	New	0	±0
Olive Tree–Independents (Olivo–I)	184	0.13	New	0	±0
Communist Party of the Andalusian People–Popular Unity (PCPA–UPAN)	123	0.08	−0.15	0	±0
Authentic Phalanx (FA)	104	0.07	New	0	±0
Humanist Party (PH)	89	0.06	−0.01	0	±0
Blank ballots	2,360	1.62	−0.39		
Total	145,791			29	±0
Valid votes	145,791	99.64	+0.04		
Invalid votes	524	0.36	−0.04		
Votes cast / turnout	146,315	55.77	−5.80		
Abstentions	116,049	44.23	+5.80		
Registered voters	262,364				

=== Dos Hermanas ===
Population: 114,672

← Summary of the 27 May 2007 City Council of Dos Hermanas election results →
Parties and alliances	Popular vote			Seats	
Parties and alliances	Votes	%	±pp	Total	+/−
Spanish Socialist Workers' Party of Andalusia (PSOE–A)	24,495	59.63	−1.24	18	±0
People's Party (PP)	8,446	20.56	+2.80	6	+1
United Left/The Greens–Assembly for Andalusia (IULV–CA)	4,274	10.40	+0.63	3	±0
Andalusian Party (PA)	1,438	3.50	−2.38	0	−1
Socialist Party of Andalusia (PSA)	1,334	3.25	+0.38	0	±0
The Greens 2007 (LV2007)	461	1.12	−0.09	0	±0
Blank ballots	631	1.54	−0.10		
Total	41,079			27	±0
Valid votes	41,079	99.64	+0.02		
Invalid votes	148	0.36	−0.02		
Votes cast / turnout	41,227	45.77	−6.29		
Abstentions	48,849	54.23	+6.29		
Registered voters	90,076				

=== Écija ===
Population: 39,295

← Summary of the 27 May 2007 City Council of Écija election results →
Parties and alliances	Popular vote			Seats	
Parties and alliances	Votes	%	±pp	Total	+/−
Spanish Socialist Workers' Party of Andalusia (PSOE–A)	7,988	39.73	+11.39	9	+2
Andalusian Party (PA)	4,850	24.12	−5.65	6	−1
People's Party (PP)	3,496	17.39	+6.24	4	+2
Independent Ecijan Socialist Party (PSEI)	1,501	7.47	−1.90	1	−1
United Left/The Greens–Assembly for Andalusia (IULV–CA)	1,255	6.24	−7.10	1	−2
Ecijan Force (FuE)	716	3.56	New	0	±0
Blank ballots	298	1.48	+0.33		
Total	20,104			21	±0
Valid votes	20,104	99.54	+0.01		
Invalid votes	92	0.46	−0.01		
Votes cast / turnout	20,196	66.16	−3.72		
Abstentions	10,330	33.84	+3.72		
Registered voters	30,526				

=== El Ejido ===
Population: 75,969

← Summary of the 27 May 2007 City Council of El Ejido election results →
Parties and alliances	Popular vote			Seats	
Parties and alliances	Votes	%	±pp	Total	+/−
Party of Almería (PdeAL)	12,587	51.89	New	15	+15
Spanish Socialist Workers' Party of Andalusia (PSOE–A)	5,191	21.40	−4.19	6	−1
People's Party (PP)	3,859	15.91	−50.97	4	−14
Social Party of El Ejido (PSE)	1,049	4.32	New	0	±0
United Left/The Greens–Assembly for Andalusia (IULV–CA)	788	3.25	−0.06	0	±0
Andalusian Party (PA)	315	1.30	−1.15	0	±0
Independent Group for Almería (GIAL)	112	0.46	New	0	±0
Blank ballots	358	1.48	+0.02		
Total	24,259			25	±0
Valid votes	24,259	99.66	+0.05		
Invalid votes	83	0.34	−0.05		
Votes cast / turnout	24,342	57.33	−1.66		
Abstentions	18,121	42.67	+1.66		
Registered voters	42,463				

=== El Puerto de Santa María ===
Population: 83,101

← Summary of the 27 May 2007 City Council of El Puerto de Santa María election results →
Parties and alliances	Popular vote			Seats	
Parties and alliances	Votes	%	±pp	Total	+/−
People's Party (PP)	11,987	38.91	+11.15	11	+3
Spanish Socialist Workers' Party of Andalusia (PSOE–A)	5,646	18.33	+2.59	5	+1
Portuese Independents (IP)	4,997	16.22	−16.26	4	−6
United Left/The Greens–Assembly for Andalusia (IULV–CA)	4,649	15.09	+2.97	4	+1
Andalusian Party (PA)	1,677	5.44	+2.27	1	+1
Democratic Party (PDco)	504	1.64	New	0	±0
Socialist Party of Andalusia (PSA)	394	1.28	−1.70	0	±0
The Greens (LV)	352	1.14	+0.22	0	±0
Andalusian Forum (FA)	161	0.52	New	0	±0
Blank ballots	442	1.43	+0.13		
Total	30,809			25	±0
Valid votes	30,809	99.60	−0.10		
Invalid votes	123	0.40	+0.10		
Votes cast / turnout	30,932	47.06	−4.39		
Abstentions	34,794	52.94	+4.39		
Registered voters	65,726				

=== Fuengirola ===
Population: 63,899

← Summary of the 27 May 2007 City Council of Fuengirola election results →
Parties and alliances	Popular vote			Seats	
Parties and alliances	Votes	%	±pp	Total	+/−
People's Party (PP)	13,564	57.98	+3.10	16	±0
Spanish Socialist Workers' Party of Andalusia (PSOE–A)	6,588	28.16	−2.13	8	±0
Andalusian Party (PA)	1,549	6.62	+0.97	1	±0
United Left/The Greens–Assembly for Andalusia (IULV–CA)	1,030	4.40	+0.85	0	±0
The Greens 2007 (LV2007)	440	1.88	−0.15	0	±0
Blank ballots	225	0.96	−0.32		
Total	23,396			25	±0
Valid votes	23,396	99.64	+0.17		
Invalid votes	85	0.36	−0.17		
Votes cast / turnout	23,481	56.66	−7.65		
Abstentions	17,963	43.34	+7.65		
Registered voters	41,444				

=== Granada ===
Population: 237,929

← Summary of the 27 May 2007 City Council of Granada election results →
Parties and alliances	Popular vote			Seats	
Parties and alliances	Votes	%	±pp	Total	+/−
People's Party (PP)	60,310	53.33	+5.25	16	+2
Spanish Socialist Workers' Party of Andalusia (PSOE–A)	37,200	32.90	−2.51	9	−2
United Left/The Greens–Assembly for Andalusia (IULV–CA)	9,067	8.02	+0.64	2	±0
The Greens 2007 (LV2007)	2,323	2.05	−0.12	0	±0
Andalusian Party (PA)	1,555	1.38	−0.45	0	±0
Socialist Party of Andalusia (PSA)	477	0.42	−1.95	0	±0
Realist Party (PR)	237	0.21	New	0	±0
Spanish Catholic Movement (MCE)	132	0.12	New	0	±0
Spain 2000 (E–2000)	89	0.08	New	0	±0
Humanist Party (PH)	86	0.08	−0.04	0	±0
Blank ballots	1,602	1.42	−1.04		
Total	113,078			27	±0
Valid votes	113,078	99.57	+0.09		
Invalid votes	489	0.43	−0.09		
Votes cast / turnout	113,567	56.80	−5.24		
Abstentions	86,366	43.20	+5.24		
Registered voters	199,933				

=== Huelva ===
Population: 145,763

← Summary of the 27 May 2007 City Council of Huelva election results →
Parties and alliances	Popular vote			Seats	
Parties and alliances	Votes	%	±pp	Total	+/−
People's Party (PP)	31,056	51.11	−2.21	15	−1
Spanish Socialist Workers' Party of Andalusia (PSOE–A)	22,424	36.90	+3.22	10	±0
United Left/The Greens–Assembly for Andalusia (IULV–CA)	4,477	7.37	+1.26	2	+1
The Greens 2007 (LV2007)	688	1.13	−0.60	0	±0
Andalusian Party (PA)	665	1.09	−2.30	0	±0
Socialist Party of Andalusia (PSA)	398	0.65	New	0	±0
Christian Democratic Party of Huelva (PCDH)	148	0.24	New	0	±0
National Democracy (DN)	105	0.17	New	0	±0
Blank ballots	803	1.32	−0.46		
Total	60,764			27	±0
Valid votes	60,764	99.63	+0.07		
Invalid votes	228	0.37	−0.07		
Votes cast / turnout	60,992	52.24	−4.12		
Abstentions	55,753	47.76	+4.12		
Registered voters	116,745				

=== Jaén ===
Population: 116,769

← Summary of the 27 May 2007 City Council of Jaén election results →
Parties and alliances	Popular vote			Seats	
Parties and alliances	Votes	%	±pp	Total	+/−
People's Party (PP)	26,627	45.41	−1.40	13	−1
Spanish Socialist Workers' Party of Andalusia (PSOE–A)	25,101	42.80	+4.24	12	+1
United Left/The Greens–Assembly for Andalusia (IULV–CA)	3,909	6.67	−0.58	2	±0
Andalusian Party (PA)	1,484	2.53	−0.77	0	±0
The Greens 2007 (LV2007)	395	0.67	−0.16	0	±0
Socialist Party of Andalusia (PSA)	273	0.47	−0.03	0	±0
National Democracy (DN)	88	0.15	New	0	±0
Humanist Party (PH)	69	0.12	New	0	±0
Blank ballots	696	1.19	−0.71		
Total	58,642			27	±0
Valid votes	58,642	99.68	+0.19		
Invalid votes	187	0.32	−0.19		
Votes cast / turnout	58,829	64.11	−2.36		
Abstentions	32,936	35.89	+2.36		
Registered voters	91,765				

=== Jerez de la Frontera ===
Population: 199,544

← Summary of the 27 May 2007 City Council of Jerez de la Frontera election results →
Parties and alliances	Popular vote			Seats	
Parties and alliances	Votes	%	±pp	Total	+/−
Spanish Socialist Workers' Party of Andalusia (PSOE–A)	46,671	51.03	+18.81	15	+6
People's Party (PP)	23,599	25.80	−1.78	7	−1
Socialist Party of Andalusia (PSA)	11,967	13.09	−16.96	4	−5
United Left/The Greens–Assembly for Andalusia (IULV–CA)	5,292	5.79	+0.78	1	±0
Andalusian Party (PA)	1,687	1.84	−0.35	0	±0
Administrators of Jerez Party (PAJE)	514	0.56	New	0	±0
The Greens (LV)	468	0.51	New	0	±0
Andalusian Social Democratic Party (PSDA)	77	0.08	New	0	±0
Blank ballots	1,178	1.29	+0.05		
Total	91,453			27	±0
Valid votes	91,453	99.73	+0.06		
Invalid votes	252	0.27	−0.06		
Votes cast / turnout	91,705	57.35	−3.20		
Abstentions	68,201	42.65	+3.20		
Registered voters	159,906				

=== La Línea de la Concepción ===
Population: 63,026

← Summary of the 27 May 2007 City Council of La Línea de la Concepción election results →
Parties and alliances	Popular vote			Seats	
Parties and alliances	Votes	%	±pp	Total	+/−
People's Party (PP)	14,145	51.73	−17.42	15	−5
Spanish Socialist Workers' Party of Andalusia (PSOE–A)	8,458	30.93	+11.18	8	+3
United Left/The Greens–Assembly for Andalusia (IULV–CA)	1,585	5.80	+2.73	1	+1
Unity for La Línea (UPL)	1,479	5.41	New	1	+1
Andalusian Party (PA)	1,064	3.89	+1.80	0	±0
Socialist Party of Andalusia (PSA)	319	1.17	+0.79	0	±0
Blank ballots	294	1.08	+0.27		
Total	27,344			25	±0
Valid votes	27,344	99.69	+0.02		
Invalid votes	86	0.31	−0.02		
Votes cast / turnout	27,430	53.09	−13.28		
Abstentions	24,241	46.91	+13.28		
Registered voters	51,671				

=== Linares ===
Population: 61,452

← Summary of the 27 May 2007 City Council of Linares election results →
Parties and alliances	Popular vote			Seats	
Parties and alliances	Votes	%	±pp	Total	+/−
Spanish Socialist Workers' Party of Andalusia (PSOE–A)	14,803	56.12	+0.01	16	+1
People's Party (PP)	7,369	27.94	+2.08	7	±0
United Left/The Greens–Assembly for Andalusia (IULV–CA)	2,278	8.64	−0.70	2	±0
Andalusian Convergence (CAnda)	1,048	3.97	New	0	±0
Andalusian Party (PA)	398	1.51	−4.26	0	−1
The Greens 2007 (LV2007)	129	0.49	New	0	±0
Blank ballots	352	1.33	−0.04		
Total	26,377			25	±0
Valid votes	26,377	98.52	−1.08		
Invalid votes	397	1.48	+1.08		
Votes cast / turnout	26,774	56.07	−7.26		
Abstentions	20,976	43.93	+7.26		
Registered voters	47,750				

=== Málaga ===
Population: 560,631

← Summary of the 27 May 2007 City Council of Málaga election results →
Parties and alliances	Popular vote			Seats	
Parties and alliances	Votes	%	±pp	Total	+/−
People's Party (PP)	111,761	51.03	+1.90	17	±0
Spanish Socialist Workers' Party of Andalusia (PSOE–A)	79,466	36.28	+2.09	12	±0
United Left/The Greens–Assembly for Andalusia (IULV–CA)	15,799	7.21	−1.14	2	±0
Andalusian Party (PA)	3,338	1.52	−2.58	0	±0
The Greens 2007 (LV2007)	2,821	1.29	−0.43	0	±0
Socialist Party of Andalusia (PSA)	1,079	0.49	+0.10	0	±0
Anti-Bullfighting Party Against Mistreatment of Animals (PACMA)	750	0.34	New	0	±0
National Union (UN)	318	0.15	−0.07	0	±0
Andalusian Left Bloc (BAI)	281	0.13	New	0	±0
Republican Left (IR)	220	0.10	New	0	±0
Humanist Party (PH)	198	0.09	−0.01	0	±0
National Alliance (AN)	168	0.08	New	0	±0
Andalusian Convergence (CAnda)	154	0.07	New	0	±0
Blank ballots	2,653	1.21	−0.41		
Total	219,006			31	±0
Valid votes	219,006	99.71	+0.07		
Invalid votes	634	0.29	−0.07		
Votes cast / turnout	219,640	50.17	−6.10		
Abstentions	218,190	49.83	+6.10		
Registered voters	437,830				

=== Marbella ===
Population: 125,519

← Summary of the 27 May 2007 City Council of Marbella election results →
Parties and alliances	Popular vote			Seats	
Parties and alliances	Votes	%	±pp	Total	+/−
People's Party (PP)	24,160	49.71	+34.68	16	+12
Spanish Socialist Workers' Party of Andalusia (PSOE–A)	15,963	32.84	+15.92	10	+5
United Left/The Greens–Assembly for Andalusia (IULV–CA)	3,004	6.18	+3.69	1	+1
San Pedro Option (OSP)^{1}	2,154	4.43	+0.74	0	±0
United People of Marbella–San Pedro (PUMSP)	829	1.71	New	0	±0
Citizen Cause (CauC)	717	1.48	New	0	±0
Independent Andalusian Centre of Marbella–San Pedro (CAI)	228	0.47	+0.10	0	±0
Andalusian Party (PA)	216	0.44	−9.30	0	−3
Socialist Party of Andalusia (PSA)	188	0.39	+0.09	0	±0
Andalusian Convergence (CAnda)	113	0.23	New	0	±0
Citizens of Marbella and San Pedro de Alcántara (CMSP)	108	0.22	New	0	±0
Andalusian Solidary Left (ISAnd)	89	0.18	New	0	±0
Party of the South (PASUR)	43	0.09	New	0	±0
Humanist Party (PH)	38	0.08	−0.04	0	±0
Liberal Independent Group (GIL)	n/a	n/a	−47.09	0	−15
Blank ballots	753	1.55	+0.13		
Total	48,603			27	±0
Valid votes	48,603	99.56	−0.04		
Invalid votes	216	0.44	+0.04		
Votes cast / turnout	48,819	59.51	+1.30		
Abstentions	33,219	40.49	−1.30		
Registered voters	82,038				
Sources
Footnotes: ^{1} San Pedro Option results are compared to Independent Group for Marbella and San Pedro de Alcántara totals in the 2003 election.

=== Morón de la Frontera ===
Population: 28,295

← Summary of the 27 May 2007 City Council of Morón de la Frontera election results →
Parties and alliances	Popular vote			Seats	
Parties and alliances	Votes	%	±pp	Total	+/−
People's Party (PP)	7,338	55.52	+18.14	13	+4
Spanish Socialist Workers' Party of Andalusia (PSOE–A)	3,802	28.76	−2.67	6	−1
United Left/The Greens–Assembly for Andalusia (IULV–CA)	1,600	12.10	−3.76	2	−1
Andalusian Party (PA)	299	2.26	−6.78	0	−2
Blank ballots	179	1.35	−0.64		
Total	13,218			21	±0
Valid votes	13,218	94.56	−4.59		
Invalid votes	760	5.44	+4.59		
Votes cast / turnout	13,978	59.67	−4.05		
Abstentions	9,448	40.33	+4.05		
Registered voters	23,426				

=== Motril ===
Population: 57,895

← Summary of the 27 May 2007 City Council of Motril election results →
Parties and alliances	Popular vote			Seats	
Parties and alliances	Votes	%	±pp	Total	+/−
People's Party (PP)	11,214	41.90	+8.28	12	+3
Spanish Socialist Workers' Party of Andalusia (PSOE–A)	9,320	34.82	+1.06	9	±0
Andalusian Party–Costa Cálida Independent Party (PA–PICC)	2,213	8.27	+1.04	2	±0
United Left/The Greens–Assembly for Andalusia (IULV–CA)	2,140	8.00	−2.29	2	±0
Independent Group for the Municipal Autonomy of Torrenueva (GRITO–PDDC)	1,274	4.76	−2.56	0	−2
Party of Independent and Solidarity Citizens (PACIS)	181	0.68	−0.65	0	±0
The Greens 2007 (LV2007)	81	0.30	New	0	±0
Andalusian Convergence (CAnda)	75	0.28	New	0	±0
Independent Motrilenian Democratic Group (ADMI)	n/a	n/a	−5.20	0	−1
Blank ballots	266	0.99	−0.25		
Total	26,764			25	±0
Valid votes	26,764	99.60	+0.10		
Invalid votes	107	0.40	−0.10		
Votes cast / turnout	26,871	61.07	−0.35		
Abstentions	17,127	38.93	+0.35		
Registered voters	43,998				

=== Ronda ===
Population: 35,836

← Summary of the 27 May 2007 City Council of Ronda election results →
Parties and alliances	Popular vote			Seats	
Parties and alliances	Votes	%	±pp	Total	+/−
Andalusian Party (PA)	7,151	40.14	+21.09	9	+5
Spanish Socialist Workers' Party of Andalusia (PSOE–A)	5,358	30.08	−2.43	7	−1
People's Party (PP)	3,197	17.95	+2.13	4	+1
United Left/The Greens–Assembly for Andalusia (IULV–CA)	1,060	5.95	+0.89	1	±0
The Greens 2007 (LV2007)	412	2.31	New	0	±0
Social Democratic Party of Ronda (PDSR)	302	1.70	New	0	±0
Liberal Independent Group (GIL)	n/a	n/a	−23.70	0	−5
Blank ballots	334	1.87	+0.39		
Total	17,814			21	±0
Valid votes	17,814	99.29	−0.22		
Invalid votes	127	0.71	+0.22		
Votes cast / turnout	17,941	61.83	−4.01		
Abstentions	11,076	38.17	+4.01		
Registered voters	29,017				

=== San Fernando ===
Population: 93,544

← Summary of the 27 May 2007 City Council of San Fernando election results →
Parties and alliances	Popular vote			Seats	
Parties and alliances	Votes	%	±pp	Total	+/−
Spanish Socialist Workers' Party of Andalusia (PSOE–A)	11,091	31.62	+5.34	9	+2
Andalusian Party (PA)	10,125	28.86	−6.16	8	−2
People's Party (PP)	9,852	28.09	+0.82	8	±0
Socialist Party of Andalusia (PSA)	1,359	3.87	+0.18	0	±0
United Left/The Greens–Assembly for Andalusia (IULV–CA)	1,194	3.40	−1.47	0	±0
Social Alternative (AS)	713	2.03	New	0	±0
Republican Left (IR)	227	0.65	New	0	±0
Blank ballots	517	1.47	+0.15		
Total	35,078			25	±0
Valid votes	35,078	99.59	−0.08		
Invalid votes	146	0.41	+0.08		
Votes cast / turnout	35,224	46.46	−5.03		
Abstentions	40,597	53.54	+5.03		
Registered voters	75,821				

=== Sanlúcar de Barrameda ===
Population: 63,509

← Summary of the 27 May 2007 City Council of Sanlúcar de Barrameda election results →
Parties and alliances	Popular vote			Seats	
Parties and alliances	Votes	%	±pp	Total	+/−
Spanish Socialist Workers' Party of Andalusia (PSOE–A)	11,522	37.84	+21.54	11	+6
People's Party (PP)	5,548	18.22	−26.05	5	−8
Andalusian Party (PA)	4,343	14.26	+7.75	4	+2
Independent Citizens of Sanlúcar (CIS)	3,904	12.82	New	3	+3
United Left/The Greens–Assembly for Andalusia (IULV–CA)	1,610	5.29	−2.09	1	−1
Sanluquenian Alternative (AS)	1,571	5.16	−3.19	1	−1
Socialist Party of Andalusia (PSA)	963	3.16	+1.28	0	±0
Socialist Party for the Progress of Sanlúcar (PSP Sanlúcar)	596	1.96	New	0	±0
Algaida for the Development of Sanlúcar (ALDESA)	n/a	n/a	−5.39	0	−1
Blank ballots	394	1.29	−0.15		
Total	30,451			25	±0
Valid votes	30,451	99.66	+0.11		
Invalid votes	104	0.34	−0.11		
Votes cast / turnout	30,555	59.21	+3.31		
Abstentions	21,048	40.79	−3.31		
Registered voters	51,603				

=== Seville ===
Population: 704,414

=== Utrera ===
Population: 48,222

← Summary of the 27 May 2007 City Council of Utrera election results →
Parties and alliances	Popular vote			Seats	
Parties and alliances	Votes	%	±pp	Total	+/−
Andalusian Party (PA)	11,462	48.89	+9.63	11	+1
Spanish Socialist Workers' Party of Andalusia (PSOE–A)	8,895	37.94	+3.98	8	±0
People's Party (PP)	1,992	8.50	−5.98	2	−1
United Left/The Greens–Assembly for Andalusia (IULV–CA)	815	3.48	−1.51	0	±0
Blank ballots	282	1.20	+0.18		
Total	23,446			21	±0
Valid votes	23,446	99.74	±0.00		
Invalid votes	62	0.26	±0.00		
Votes cast / turnout	23,508	60.82	−4.31		
Abstentions	15,146	39.18	+4.31		
Registered voters	38,654				

=== Vélez-Málaga ===
Population: 67,697

← Summary of the 27 May 2007 City Council of Vélez-Málaga election results →
Parties and alliances	Popular vote			Seats	
Parties and alliances	Votes	%	±pp	Total	+/−
People's Party (PP)	10,250	32.80	+5.26	10	+3
Spanish Socialist Workers' Party of Andalusia (PSOE–A)	9,900	31.68	−3.42	9	−1
Pro-Torre del Mar Municipality Independent Group (GIPMTM)^{1}	3,234	10.35	n/a	3	±0
United Left/The Greens–Assembly for Andalusia (IULV–CA)	2,884	9.23	+0.70	2	±0
Andalusian Party (PA)^{1}	1,691	5.41	n/a	1	−1
The Greens 2007 (LV2007)	1,294	4.14	+0.52	0	±0
Citizens for Democracy and Change (CCDC)	1,030	3.30	New	0	±0
Socialist Party of Andalusia (PSA)	604	1.93	−3.19	0	−1
Blank ballots	367	1.17	−0.25		
Total	31,254			25	±0
Valid votes	31,254	99.45	+0.11		
Invalid votes	172	0.55	−0.11		
Votes cast / turnout	31,426	61.99	−2.60		
Abstentions	19,267	38.01	+2.60		
Registered voters	50,693				
Sources
Footnotes: ^{1} Within the Andalusian Party–Pro-Torre del Mar Municipality Indep. Group alliance in the 2003 election.
