= Cordobese Union =

Cordobese Union Unión Cordobesa
- Leader: Rafael Gómez Sánchez
- Secretary-General: Roque de Llano Iribarnegaray
- Founded: 2011
- Dissolved: March 2019
- Headquarters: Córdoba
- Political position: Right-wing populism
- Colours: Green
- City Council of Córdoba: 0 / 29

Website
- www.unioncordobesa.es

Cordobese Union (Spanish: Unión Cordobesa, UCOR) was a localist political party in Córdoba created by Rafael Gómez Sánchez ahead of the 2011 local elections.

== History ==
Rafael Gómez (better known as "Sandokán") first made public his intention to create a political party for the municipal elections of 2011 in December 2010. Cordobese Union won 24,805 votes and became the second political force in the city (the People's Party was the most voted one), gaining 5 seats in the City Council.

In the local elections of 2015 UCOR lost around 15,000 votes and 4 seats. Rafael Gómez resigned from the City Council. He was replaced by Rafael Carlos Serrano Haro, his nephew. Rafael Gómez currently faces a trial for 11 crimes against the Public Treasury for which the Prosecutor's Office asks for 44 years in prison. In February 2017 he was sentenced to 5 years in prison for one of those crimes.
