= City Council of Granada =

Local government of the city of Granada

City Council of Granada Ayuntamiento de Granada

Type
- Type: Unicameral house of the Ayuntamiento of Granada

Leadership
- Mayor: Marifrán Carazo, PP since 28 May 2023

Structure
- Political groups: Government (15): PP (15); Opposition (12): PSOE-A (10); Vox (2)
- Length of term: 4 years

Elections
- Last election: 28 May 2023
- Next election: 2027

Meeting place
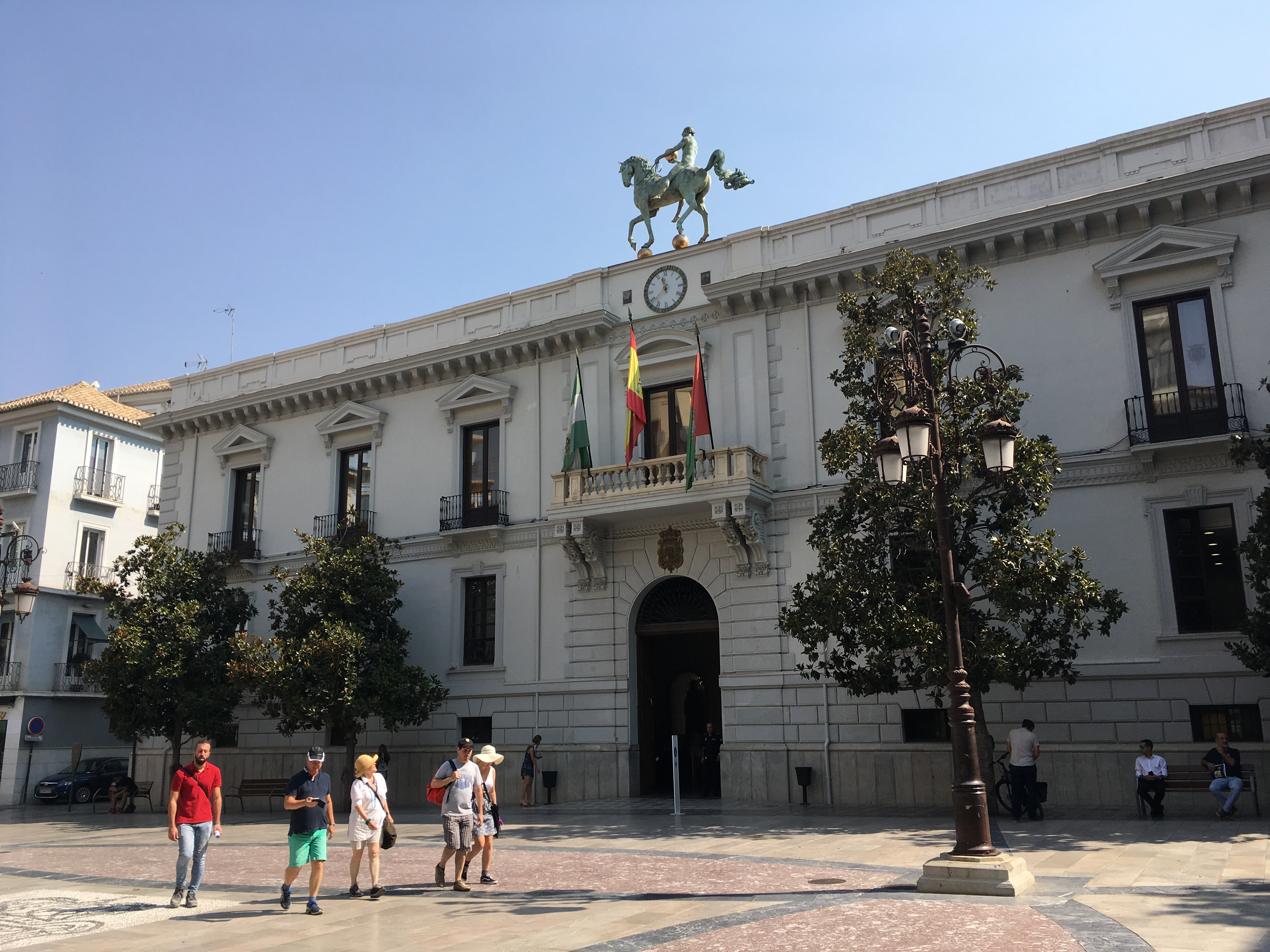
- Plaza del Carmen 5, Granada, Spain

The City Council of Granada (Spanish: Ayuntamiento de Granada is the institution charged with the government and administration of the Spanish municipality of Granada.

== History ==
Early modern period

Following the conquest of Granada in 1492, the offices of corregidor and regidor(es) were established in Granada. While the Constitutive Charter granted by the Catholic Monarchs on 20 September 1500 has been traditionally framed by most authors as the point of origin of the city's municipal regime, the document has been more recently argued to rather be a reform or restructuration of preexisting political realities. The latter royal stipulations established a municipal institutional structure consisting of 1 corregidor, 24 regidores and 2 ordinary alcaldes, remaining a corregimiento from then on for most of the Early Modern period. Throughout this period, the number of regidores ranged from 44 (1587) to 15 (1787), while a military background (capa y espada) prevailed vis-à-vis the extraction of the monarch-appointed corregidor, the highest ranking official. Most often, the two alcaldes were experts in law covering the shortcomings of the corregidor on that field. While originally the regidores were appointed at the discretion of the monarch, eventually the trade of the condition of regidor thrived.

== Structure ==
It is formed by the Plenary (Pleno), the Mayor (alcalde) and the Local Government Board (Junta de Gobierno Local). The Plenary of the Ayuntamiento is the body of political representation of the citizens in the municipal government. Its members (as of 2019, 27), known as concejales ("municipal councillors"), are elected for a 4-year mandate following the schedule of the country-wide municipal elections. They are organised in municipal groups. The Local Government Board consists of the mayor, the deputy mayor(s) and a number of delegates assuming the portfolios for the different government areas, delegated by the mayor. All those positions are held by municipal councillors.

The mayor (alcalde), the supreme representative of the city, presides over the ayuntamiento. The mayor is invested by the municipal councillors from among themselves following each municipal election. Following the May 2019 municipal election, Luis Salvador of the Citizens Party, was invested as mayor on 15 June 2019. Salvador resigned in 2021, having lost the support of the PP. He was succeeded by the Socialist, Francisco Cuenca who had previously served as mayor from 2016-2019. In the 2023 Spanish local elections Cuenca was ousted by Marifrán Carazo of the PP. Carazo increased the PP's number of seats from 7 to 14, ganing her a slim majority and making her the first female mayor of the city.

== Headquarters ==
The city hall is located at a building in the plaza del Carmen, the undemolished part of a convent of female Discalced Carmelites where the municipal premises were moved to from the old Madrasah of Granada in 1858 following the ecclesial desamortización.

== Results of the elections since 1979 ==
City councilors in the City Council of Granada since 1979
Key to parties CGT PCA PA PSOE-A UCD CP IU-CA CDS AP PPA IULV-CA UPyD Vamos Cs Adelante Vox
| Election | Distribution |
| 1979 | 1 / 3 / 6 / 6 / 11 |
| 1983 | 18 / 9 |
| 1987 | 2 / 12 / 2 / 11 |
| 1991 | 2 / 12 / 13 |
| 1995 | 4 / 8 / 15 |
| 1999 | 2 / 1 / 11 / 13 |
| 2003 | 2 / 11 / 14 |
| 2007 | 2 / 9 / 16 |
| 2011 | 2 / 8 / 1 / 16 |
| 2015 | 1 / 3 / 8 / 4 / 11 |
| 2019 | 3 / 10 / 4 / 7 / 3 |
| 2023 | 10 / 15 / 2 |
