= Luis Salvador =

Luis Salvador may refer to:

- Luis Salvador Carmona (1708–1767), Spanish sculptor
- Luis Miguel Salvador (born 1968), Mexican footballer
- Luis Salvador (politician) (born 1963), Spanish politician
- Lou Salvador (1905–1973), Filipino basketball player

== See also ==
- Luis Salvadores Salvi (1932–2014), Chilean basketball player
