= Marifrán Carazo =

Spanish politician (born 11 October 1977)

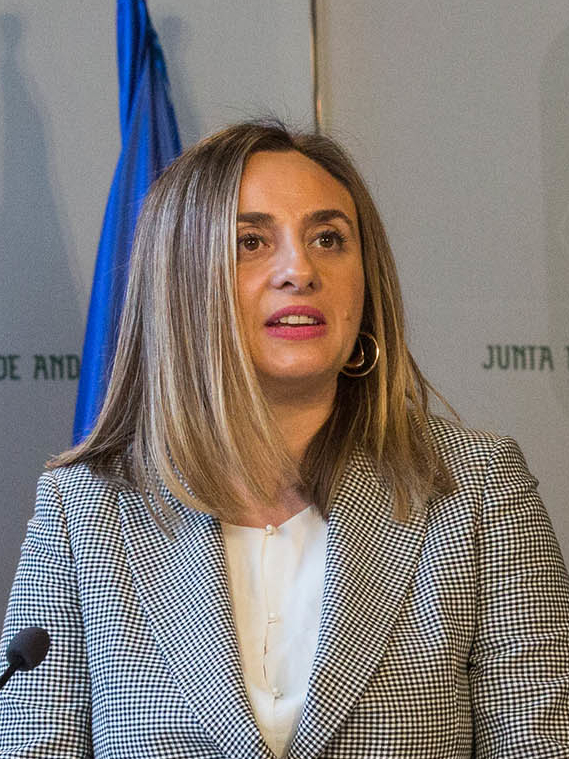

Mayor of Granada
- Incumbent
- Assumed office 17 June 2023
- Preceded by: Francisco Cuenca

Minister of Development, Infrastructure and Planning
- In office 22 January 2019 – 3 April 2023
- President: Juan Manuel Moreno
- Preceded by: Felipe López García (Development); José Fiscal López (Environment and Planning)
- Succeeded by: Rocío Díaz Jiménez

Member of the Parliament of Andalusia
- In office 19 April 2012 – 2 May 2023
- Constituency: Granada

Member of the Granada City Council
- Incumbent
- Assumed office 17 June 2023
- In office 16 June 2007 – 19 April 2012

Personal details
- Born: 11 October 1977 (age 48) Valladolid, Castilla y León, Spain
- Party: PP

María Francisca Carazo Villalonga (born 11 October 1977) is a Spanish People's Party (PP) politician, elected mayor of Granada in 2023. She was previously a city councillor in Granada (2007–2012), member of the Parliament of Andalusia (2012–2023) and Minister of Development, Infrastructures and Territory Planning in the Regional Government of Andalusia (2019–2023).

== Biography ==
Carazo was born in Valladolid, Castile and León. Having initially studied optometry, she then graduated in political science from the University of Granada. In 1996, she joined the People's Party (PP), serving as leader of the New Generations of the People's Party (NNGG) in Granada from 2000 to 2005.

In 2007, Carazo was elected onto Granada's city council and was the councillor responsible for tourism in the local government of mayor José Torres Hurtado. In 2012, she left her municipal seat upon being elected to the Parliament of Andalusia. She was the PP's lead candidate in the Granada constituency in the 2018 Andalusian regional election, in which the party formed a government with Citizens (Cs). President of the Regional Government of Andalusia, Juan Manuel Moreno, named her Minister of Development, Infrastructures and Territory Planning.

On 3 January 2023, Carazo was named head of the PP's list for Granada City Council in the May elections. She resigned her regional offices on 3 April. She increased her party's share from 7 to 14 of the 27 seats, making her the first woman to be mayor of Granada.

== Personal life ==
Carazo met her husband José Ramón "Jota" Carmona at university. He was a city councillor in Antequera, Province of Málaga, and was also elected to the Parliament of Andalusia.
