= Francisco Cuenca =

Spanish politician

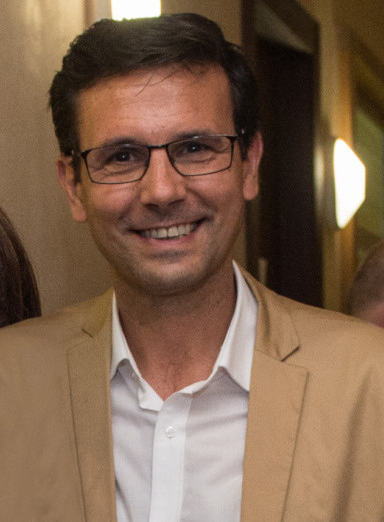
Cuenca pictured in 2017

Francisco Cuenca Rodríguez (born 1969) is a Spanish politician who served as mayor of Granada from 2016 to 2019 and from 2021 to 2023. A member of the Spanish Socialist Workers' Party (PSOE), Cuenca first became mayor after his predecessor, José Torres Hurtado from the opposing Partido Popular (PP), resigned amid a corruption scandal.

== Early life ==
Cuenca was born in Granada in 1969 and is from the Chana neighborhood of the city. He holds an undergraduate degree in Physical Education from the Universidad de Granada, and a master's degree in “Alta Dirección de Entidades Sociales.” He is the nephew of Juan Cuenca, a well-known Spanish socialist who died in 2007. He is the father of two children.

== Career ==
Cuenca has been the spokesman for the local branch of the PSOE since 2011. In 2016 he became the mayor of Granada. He is the sixth member of the party to serve as mayor of Granada. At the time he took office, he was the city's first mayor in 13 years from a party other than the PP.

Luis Salvador of Ciudadanos succeeded Cuenca as mayor in 2019. In 2021, after the PP withdrew its support from Salvador's administration, the Granada city council again elected Cuenca as mayor. After the PP won a majority on the city council in municipal elections in May 2023, Cuenca was succeeded as mayor by Marifrán Carazo of the PP on June 17, 2023.
