= 1979 Spanish local elections in Andalusia =

This article presents the results breakdown of the local elections held in Andalusia on 3 April 1979. The following tables show detailed results in the autonomous community's most populous municipalities, sorted alphabetically.

== City control ==
The following table lists party control in the most populous municipalities, including provincial capitals (highlighted in bold).

Municipality	Population	New control
Alcalá de Guadaíra	42,227	Spanish Socialist Workers' Party (PSOE)
Algeciras	92,273	Communist Party of Spain (PCE)
**Almería**	133,844	Spanish Socialist Workers' Party (PSOE)
Antequera	41,608	Independent Antequeran Candidacy (CAI)
Benalmádena	11,411	Independent Group of Benalmádena (GIB)
**Cádiz**	153,327	Spanish Socialist Workers' Party (PSOE)
Chiclana de la Frontera	35,289	Independent Candidacy (CI)
**Córdoba**	269,998	Communist Party of Spain (PCE)
Dalías	28,419	Spanish Socialist Workers' Party (PSOE) (UCD in 1980)
Dos Hermanas	49,103	Communist Party of Spain (PCE)
Écija	35,503	Socialist Party of Andalusia–Andalusian Party (PSA–PA)
El Puerto de Santa María	51,007	Communist Party of Spain (PCE)
Fuengirola	27,327	Spanish Socialist Workers' Party (PSOE)
**Granada**	225,034	Spanish Socialist Workers' Party (PSOE)
**Huelva**	122,494	Spanish Socialist Workers' Party (PSOE)
**Jaén**	88,968	Spanish Socialist Workers' Party (PSOE)
Jerez de la Frontera	180,098	Socialist Party of Andalusia–Andalusian Party (PSA–PA)
La Línea de la Concepción	57,255	Spanish Socialist Workers' Party (PSOE)
Linares	55,322	Spanish Socialist Workers' Party (PSOE)
**Málaga**	454,882	Spanish Socialist Workers' Party (PSOE)
Marbella	55,537	Spanish Socialist Workers' Party (PSOE)
Morón de la Frontera	28,091	Union of the Democratic Centre (UCD)
Motril	38,617	Party of Labour of Andalusia (PTA) (PSOE in 1983)
Ronda	31,895	Socialist Party of Andalusia–Andalusian Party (PSA–PA)
San Fernando	67,614	Socialist Party of Andalusia–Andalusian Party (PSA–PA)
Sanlúcar de Barrameda	47,558	Communist Party of Spain (PCE)
**Seville**	622,532	Socialist Party of Andalusia–Andalusian Party (PSA–PA)
Utrera	38,240	Spanish Socialist Workers' Party (PSOE)
Vélez-Málaga	42,532	Spanish Socialist Workers' Party (PSOE)

== Municipalities ==
=== Alcalá de Guadaíra ===
Population: 42,227

Summary of the 3 April 1979 City Council of Alcalá de Guadaíra election results →
Parties and alliances	Popular vote			Seats	
Parties and alliances	Votes	%	±pp	Total	+/−
Spanish Socialist Workers' Party (PSOE)	6,986	38.15	n/a	8	n/a
Communist Party of Spain (PCE)	4,862	26.55	n/a	6	n/a
Union of the Democratic Centre (UCD)	4,180	22.82	n/a	5	n/a
Socialist Party of Andalusia–Andalusian Party (PSA–PA)	1,988	10.86	n/a	2	n/a
Revolutionary Communist League (LCR)	212	1.16	n/a	0	n/a
Party of Labour of Andalusia (PTA)	86	0.47	n/a	0	n/a
Blank ballots	0	0.00	n/a		
Total	18,314			21	n/a
Valid votes	18,314	99.52	n/a		
Invalid votes	88	0.48	n/a		
Votes cast / turnout	18,402	66.34	n/a		
Abstentions	9,338	33.66	n/a		
Registered voters	27,740				

=== Algeciras ===
Population: 92,273

Summary of the 3 April 1979 City Council of Algeciras election results →
Parties and alliances	Popular vote			Seats	
Parties and alliances	Votes	%	±pp	Total	+/−
Communist Party of Spain (PCE)	9,427	31.04	n/a	8	n/a
Union of the Democratic Centre (UCD)	7,670	25.25	n/a	7	n/a
Spanish Socialist Workers' Party (PSOE)	6,972	22.95	n/a	6	n/a
Socialist Party of Andalusia–Andalusian Party (PSA–PA)	4,703	15.48	n/a	4	n/a
Democratic Coalition (CD)	826	2.72	n/a	0	n/a
New Force (FN)	549	1.81	n/a	0	n/a
Communist Movement of Andalusia (MCA)	226	0.74	n/a	0	n/a
Blank ballots	0	0.00	n/a		
Total	30,373			25	n/a
Valid votes	30,373	99.14	n/a		
Invalid votes	265	0.86	n/a		
Votes cast / turnout	30,638	49.51	n/a		
Abstentions	31,241	50.49	n/a		
Registered voters	61,879				

=== Almería ===
Population: 133,844

Summary of the 3 April 1979 City Council of Almería election results →
Parties and alliances	Popular vote			Seats	
Parties and alliances	Votes	%	±pp	Total	+/−
Union of the Democratic Centre (UCD)	18,164	37.02	n/a	11	n/a
Spanish Socialist Workers' Party (PSOE)	15,956	32.52	n/a	10	n/a
Communist Party of Spain (PCE)	5,797	11.81	n/a	3	n/a
Socialist Party of Andalusia–Andalusian Party (PSA–PA)	5,389	10.98	n/a	3	n/a
Democratic Coalition (CD)	1,805	3.68	n/a	0	n/a
Party of Labour of Andalusia (PTA)	845	1.72	n/a	0	n/a
Communist Movement–Organization of Communist Left (MCA–OIC)	591	1.20	n/a	0	n/a
Spanish Socialist Workers' Party (historical) (PSOEh)	521	1.06	n/a	0	n/a
Blank ballots	0	0.00	n/a		
Total	49,068			27	n/a
Valid votes	49,068	98.83	n/a		
Invalid votes	580	1.17	n/a		
Votes cast / turnout	49,648	56.33	n/a		
Abstentions	38,487	43.67	n/a		
Registered voters	88,135				

=== Antequera ===
Population: 41,608

Summary of the 3 April 1979 City Council of Antequera election results →
Parties and alliances	Popular vote			Seats	
Parties and alliances	Votes	%	±pp	Total	+/−
Independent Antequeran Candidacy (CAI)	5,923	37.15	n/a	8	n/a
Spanish Socialist Workers' Party (PSOE)	4,606	28.89	n/a	6	n/a
Union of the Democratic Centre (UCD)	2,228	13.97	n/a	3	n/a
Communist Party of Spain (PCE)	2,119	13.29	n/a	3	n/a
Party of Labour of Andalusia (PTA)	923	5.79	n/a	1	n/a
Communist Movement–Organization of Communist Left (MCA–OIC)	145	0.91	n/a	0	n/a
Blank ballots	0	0.00	n/a		
Total	15,944			21	n/a
Valid votes	15,944	99.02	n/a		
Invalid votes	157	0.98	n/a		
Votes cast / turnout	16,101	61.49	n/a		
Abstentions	10,085	38.51	n/a		
Registered voters	26,186				

=== Benalmádena ===
Population: 11,411

Summary of the 3 April 1979 City Council of Benalmádena election results →
Parties and alliances	Popular vote			Seats	
Parties and alliances	Votes	%	±pp	Total	+/−
Independent Group of Benalmádena (GIB)	1,429	32.94	n/a	6	n/a
Communist Party of Spain (PCE)	1,200	27.66	n/a	5	n/a
Union of the Democratic Centre (UCD)	702	16.18	n/a	3	n/a
Spanish Socialist Workers' Party (PSOE)	648	14.94	n/a	2	n/a
Party of Labour of Andalusia–Andalusian Federation (PTA–FA)	359	8.28	n/a	1	n/a
Independents of Benalmádena (IB)	0	0.00	n/a	0	n/a
Democratic Coalition (CD)	0	0.00	n/a	0	n/a
Blank ballots	0	0.00	n/a		
Total	4,338			17	n/a
Valid votes	4,338	93.81	n/a		
Invalid votes	286	6.19	n/a		
Votes cast / turnout	4,624	67.38	n/a		
Abstentions	2,239	32.62	n/a		
Registered voters	6,863				

=== Cádiz ===
Population: 153,327

Summary of the 3 April 1979 City Council of Cádiz election results →
Parties and alliances	Popular vote			Seats	
Parties and alliances	Votes	%	±pp	Total	+/−
Union of the Democratic Centre (UCD)	21,396	41.46	n/a	12	n/a
Spanish Socialist Workers' Party (PSOE)	16,792	32.54	n/a	9	n/a
Socialist Party of Andalusia–Andalusian Party (PSA–PA)	8,637	16.73	n/a	4	n/a
Communist Party of Spain (PCE)	3,800	7.36	n/a	2	n/a
Party of Labour of Andalusia (PTA)	593	1.15	n/a	0	n/a
Revolutionary Communist League (LCR)	204	0.40	n/a	0	n/a
Communist Movement of Andalusia (MCA)	189	0.37	n/a	0	n/a
Workers' Revolutionary Organization (ORT)	0	0.00	n/a	0	n/a
Blank ballots	0	0.00	n/a		
Total	51,611			27	n/a
Valid votes	51,611	98.22	n/a		
Invalid votes	936	1.78	n/a		
Votes cast / turnout	52,547	50.43	n/a		
Abstentions	51,641	49.57	n/a		
Registered voters	104,188				

=== Chiclana de la Frontera ===
Population: 35,289

Summary of the 3 April 1979 City Council of Chiclana de la Frontera election results →
Parties and alliances	Popular vote			Seats	
Parties and alliances	Votes	%	±pp	Total	+/−
Independent Candidacy (CI)	4,625	36.44	n/a	8	n/a
Spanish Socialist Workers' Party (PSOE)	3,152	24.83	n/a	6	n/a
Union of the Democratic Centre (UCD)	2,055	16.19	n/a	3	n/a
Communist Party of Spain (PCE)	1,798	14.17	n/a	3	n/a
Party of Labour of Andalusia (PTA)	764	6.02	n/a	1	n/a
Democratic Coalition (CD)	299	2.36	n/a	0	n/a
Workers' Revolutionary Organization (ORT)	0	0.00	n/a	0	n/a
Blank ballots	0	0.00	n/a		
Total	12,693			21	n/a
Valid votes	12,693	99.63	n/a		
Invalid votes	47	0.37	n/a		
Votes cast / turnout	12,740	59.59	n/a		
Abstentions	8,638	40.41	n/a		
Registered voters	21,378				

=== Córdoba ===
Population: 269,998

Summary of the 3 April 1979 City Council of Córdoba election results →
Parties and alliances	Popular vote			Seats	
Parties and alliances	Votes	%	±pp	Total	+/−
Communist Party of Spain (PCE)	32,806	28.04	n/a	8	n/a
Union of the Democratic Centre (UCD)	30,336	25.93	n/a	7	n/a
Spanish Socialist Workers' Party (PSOE)	27,598	23.59	n/a	7	n/a
Socialist Party of Andalusia–Andalusian Party (PSA–PA)	20,082	17.16	n/a	5	n/a
Independent Cordobese Group (GIC)	1,739	1.49	n/a	0	n/a
New Force (FN)	1,655	1.41	n/a	0	n/a
Party of Labour of Andalusia (PTA)	1,438	1.23	n/a	0	n/a
Communist Movement–Organization of Communist Left (MCA–OICA)	545	0.47	n/a	0	n/a
Blank ballots	0	0.00	n/a		
Total	116,999			27	n/a
Valid votes	116,999	100.00	n/a		
Invalid votes	0	0.00	n/a		
Votes cast / turnout	116,999	64.57	n/a		
Abstentions	64,185	35.43	n/a		
Registered voters	181,184				

=== Dalías ===
Population: 28,419

Summary of the 3 April 1979 City Council of Dalías election results →
Parties and alliances	Popular vote			Seats	
Parties and alliances	Votes	%	±pp	Total	+/−
Union of the Democratic Centre (UCD)	2,627	33.57	n/a	7	n/a
Spanish Socialist Workers' Party (PSOE)	2,553	32.63	n/a	7	n/a
Communist Party of Spain (PCE)	1,435	18.34	n/a	4	n/a
Popular Independent Candidacy (CIP)	1,210	15.46	n/a	3	n/a
Blank ballots	0	0.00	n/a		
Total	7,825			21	n/a
Valid votes	7,825	98.69	n/a		
Invalid votes	104	1.31	n/a		
Votes cast / turnout	7,929	46.02	n/a		
Abstentions	9,300	53.98	n/a		
Registered voters	17,229				

=== Dos Hermanas ===
Population: 49,103

Summary of the 3 April 1979 City Council of Dos Hermanas election results →
Parties and alliances	Popular vote			Seats	
Parties and alliances	Votes	%	±pp	Total	+/−
Communist Party of Spain (PCE)	8,042	39.60	n/a	9	n/a
Spanish Socialist Workers' Party (PSOE)	6,051	29.80	n/a	7	n/a
Union of the Democratic Centre (UCD)	2,520	12.41	n/a	2	n/a
Socialist Party of Andalusia–Andalusian Party (PSA–PA)	1,689	8.32	n/a	2	n/a
Independent Democrats Group (ADI)	1,641	8.08	n/a	1	n/a
Nazarene Independent Group (GIN)	174	0.86	n/a	0	n/a
Party of Labour of Andalusia (PTA)	101	0.50	n/a	0	n/a
Revolutionary Communist League (LCR)	63	0.31	n/a	0	n/a
New Force (FN)	26	0.13	n/a	0	n/a
Workers' Revolutionary Organization (ORT)	0	0.00	n/a	0	n/a
Blank ballots	0	0.00	n/a		
Total	20,307			21	n/a
Valid votes	20,307	99.58	n/a		
Invalid votes	85	0.42	n/a		
Votes cast / turnout	20,392	63.18	n/a		
Abstentions	11,883	36.82	n/a		
Registered voters	32,275				

=== Écija ===
Population: 35,503

Summary of the 3 April 1979 City Council of Écija election results →
Parties and alliances	Popular vote			Seats	
Parties and alliances	Votes	%	±pp	Total	+/−
Socialist Party of Andalusia–Andalusian Party (PSA–PA)	7,163	49.27	n/a	11	n/a
Union of the Democratic Centre (UCD)	3,079	21.18	n/a	4	n/a
Spanish Socialist Workers' Party (PSOE)	1,526	10.50	n/a	2	n/a
Communist Party of Spain (PCE)	1,296	8.91	n/a	2	n/a
Democratic Coalition (CD)	1,265	8.70	n/a	2	n/a
New Force (FN)	209	1.44	n/a	0	n/a
Blank ballots	0	0.00	n/a		
Total	14,538			21	n/a
Valid votes	14,538	99.48	n/a		
Invalid votes	76	0.52	n/a		
Votes cast / turnout	14,614	61.62	n/a		
Abstentions	9,102	38.38	n/a		
Registered voters	23,716				

=== El Puerto de Santa María ===
Population: 51,007

Summary of the 3 April 1979 City Council of El Puerto de Santa María election results →
Parties and alliances	Popular vote			Seats	
Parties and alliances	Votes	%	±pp	Total	+/−
Union of the Democratic Centre (UCD)	4,902	30.25	n/a	8	n/a
Communist Party of Spain (PCE)	4,081	25.18	n/a	7	n/a
Spanish Socialist Workers' Party (PSOE)	3,368	20.78	n/a	5	n/a
Socialist Party of Andalusia–Andalusian Party (PSA–PA)	2,803	17.30	n/a	4	n/a
Democratic Coalition (CD)	936	5.78	n/a	1	n/a
Party of Labour of Andalusia (PTA)	116	0.72	n/a	0	n/a
Blank ballots	0	0.00	n/a		
Total	16,206			25	n/a
Valid votes	16,206	99.49	n/a		
Invalid votes	83	0.51	n/a		
Votes cast / turnout	16,289	51.99	n/a		
Abstentions	15,041	48.01	n/a		
Registered voters	31,330				

=== Fuengirola ===
Population: 27,327

Summary of the 3 April 1979 City Council of Fuengirola election results →
Parties and alliances	Popular vote			Seats	
Parties and alliances	Votes	%	±pp	Total	+/−
Spanish Socialist Workers' Party (PSOE)	4,501	42.98	n/a	10	n/a
Union of the Democratic Centre (UCD)	3,976	37.96	n/a	9	n/a
Communist Party of Spain (PCE)	1,109	10.59	n/a	2	n/a
Andalusian Christian Democracy (DCA)	349	3.33	n/a	0	n/a
Independent Citizen Group (Fuengirola) (GCI)	334	3.19	n/a	0	n/a
Democratic Coalition (CD)	204	1.95	n/a	0	n/a
Blank ballots	0	0.00	n/a		
Total	10,473			21	n/a
Valid votes	10,473	99.29	n/a		
Invalid votes	75	0.71	n/a		
Votes cast / turnout	10,548	63.42	n/a		
Abstentions	6,084	36.58	n/a		
Registered voters	16,632				

=== Granada ===
Population: 225,034

Summary of the 3 April 1979 City Council of Granada election results →
Parties and alliances	Popular vote			Seats	
Parties and alliances	Votes	%	±pp	Total	+/−
Union of the Democratic Centre (UCD)	33,786	36.19	n/a	11	n/a
Socialist Party of Andalusia–Andalusian Party (PSA–PA)	21,088	22.59	n/a	6	n/a
Spanish Socialist Workers' Party (PSOE)	19,903	21.32	n/a	6	n/a
Communist Party of Spain (PCE)	10,675	11.44	n/a	3	n/a
Granadan Candidacy of Workers (CGT)	5,488	5.88	n/a	1	n/a
Party of Labour of Andalusia (PTA)	1,198	1.28	n/a	0	n/a
Spanish Socialist Workers' Party (historical) (PSOEh)	757	0.81	n/a	0	n/a
Communist Movement–Organization of Communist Left (MCA–OIC)	320	0.34	n/a	0	n/a
Revolutionary Communist League (LCR)	130	0.14	n/a	0	n/a
Workers' Revolutionary Organization (ORT)	1	0.00	n/a	0	n/a
Blank ballots	0	0.00	n/a		
Total	93,346			27	n/a
Valid votes	93,346	99.11	n/a		
Invalid votes	841	0.89	n/a		
Votes cast / turnout	94,187	60.93	n/a		
Abstentions	60,400	39.07	n/a		
Registered voters	154,587				

=== Huelva ===
Population: 122,494

Summary of the 3 April 1979 City Council of Huelva election results →
Parties and alliances	Popular vote			Seats	
Parties and alliances	Votes	%	±pp	Total	+/−
Union of the Democratic Centre (UCD)	11,996	29.34	n/a	8	n/a
Spanish Socialist Workers' Party (PSOE)	10,134	24.79	n/a	7	n/a
Socialist Party of Andalusia–Andalusian Party (PSA–PA)	8,474	20.73	n/a	6	n/a
Workers' Revolutionary Organization (ORT)	3,804	9.30	n/a	2	n/a
Independent Group of Huelva (GIH)	3,493	8.54	n/a	2	n/a
Communist Party of Spain (PCE)	2,982	7.29	n/a	2	n/a
Blank ballots	0	0.00	n/a		
Total	40,883			27	n/a
Valid votes	40,883	98.24	n/a		
Invalid votes	731	1.76	n/a		
Votes cast / turnout	41,614	51.84	n/a		
Abstentions	38,654	48.16	n/a		
Registered voters	80,268				

=== Jaén ===
Population: 88,968

Summary of the 3 April 1979 City Council of Jaén election results →
Parties and alliances	Popular vote			Seats	
Parties and alliances	Votes	%	±pp	Total	+/−
Union of the Democratic Centre (UCD)	13,756	35.80	n/a	10	n/a
Spanish Socialist Workers' Party (PSOE)	10,396	27.05	n/a	7	n/a
Socialist Party of Andalusia–Andalusian Party (PSA–PA)	5,884	15.31	n/a	4	n/a
Communist Party of Spain (PCE)	4,584	11.93	n/a	3	n/a
Democratic Coalition (CD)	2,524	6.57	n/a	1	n/a
Union for the Freedom of Speech (ULE)	946	2.46	n/a	0	n/a
Party of Labour of Andalusia (PTA)	336	0.87	n/a	0	n/a
Blank ballots	0	0.00	n/a		
Total	38,426			25	n/a
Valid votes	38,426	99.25	n/a		
Invalid votes	291	0.75	n/a		
Votes cast / turnout	38,717	64.68	n/a		
Abstentions	21,141	35.32	n/a		
Registered voters	59,858				

=== Jerez de la Frontera ===
Population: 180,098

Summary of the 3 April 1979 City Council of Jerez de la Frontera election results →
Parties and alliances	Popular vote			Seats	
Parties and alliances	Votes	%	±pp	Total	+/−
Socialist Party of Andalusia–Andalusian Party (PSA–PA)	17,560	28.11	n/a	8	n/a
Union of the Democratic Centre (UCD)	16,295	26.08	n/a	7	n/a
Communist Party of Spain (PCE)	13,608	21.78	n/a	6	n/a
Spanish Socialist Workers' Party (PSOE)	12,904	20.66	n/a	6	n/a
Democratic Coalition (CD)	1,086	1.74	n/a	0	n/a
Party of Labour of Andalusia (PTA)	1,018	1.63	n/a	0	n/a
Blank ballots	0	0.00	n/a		
Total	62,471			27	n/a
Valid votes	62,471	99.21	n/a		
Invalid votes	495	0.79	n/a		
Votes cast / turnout	62,966	55.29	n/a		
Abstentions	50,912	44.71	n/a		
Registered voters	113,878				

=== La Línea de la Concepción ===
Population: 57,255

Summary of the 3 April 1979 City Council of La Línea de la Concepción election results →
Parties and alliances	Popular vote			Seats	
Parties and alliances	Votes	%	±pp	Total	+/−
Spanish Socialist Workers' Party (PSOE)	10,474	47.58	n/a	13	n/a
Union of the Democratic Centre (UCD)	5,945	27.01	n/a	7	n/a
Socialist Party of Andalusia–Andalusian Party (PSA–PA)	2,338	10.62	n/a	2	n/a
Communist Party of Spain (PCE)	1,863	8.46	n/a	2	n/a
Communist Movement of Andalusia (MCA)	1,157	5.26	n/a	1	n/a
Democratic Coalition (CD)	235	1.07	n/a	0	n/a
Blank ballots	0	0.00	n/a		
Total	22,012			25	n/a
Valid votes	22,012	99.15	n/a		
Invalid votes	188	0.85	n/a		
Votes cast / turnout	22,200	58.90	n/a		
Abstentions	15,490	41.10	n/a		
Registered voters	37,690				

=== Linares ===
Population: 55,322

Summary of the 3 April 1979 City Council of Linares election results →
Parties and alliances	Popular vote			Seats	
Parties and alliances	Votes	%	±pp	Total	+/−
Spanish Socialist Workers' Party (PSOE)	9,559	40.13	n/a	10	n/a
Union of the Democratic Centre (UCD)	6,418	26.94	n/a	7	n/a
Communist Party of Spain (PCE)	5,636	23.66	n/a	6	n/a
Democratic Coalition (CD)	1,755	7.37	n/a	2	n/a
Workers' Revolutionary Organization (ORT)	329	1.38	n/a	0	n/a
Communist Movement–Organization of Communist Left (MCA–OIC)	122	0.51	n/a	0	n/a
Party of Labour of Andalusia (PTA)	0	0.00	n/a	0	n/a
Blank ballots	0	0.00	n/a		
Total	23,819			25	n/a
Valid votes	23,819	99.06	n/a		
Invalid votes	227	0.94	n/a		
Votes cast / turnout	24,046	66.91	n/a		
Abstentions	11,891	33.09	n/a		
Registered voters	35,937				

=== Málaga ===
Population: 454,882

Summary of the 3 April 1979 City Council of Málaga election results →
Parties and alliances	Popular vote			Seats	
Parties and alliances	Votes	%	±pp	Total	+/−
Spanish Socialist Workers' Party (PSOE)	51,830	34.17	n/a	11	n/a
Union of the Democratic Centre (UCD)	32,238	21.26	n/a	7	n/a
Communist Party of Spain (PCE)	31,255	20.61	n/a	7	n/a
Socialist Party of Andalusia–Andalusian Party (PSA–PA)	22,179	14.62	n/a	4	n/a
Independent Candidacy of Málaga (CIM)	6,518	4.30	n/a	0	n/a
Party of Labour of Spain (PTE)	3,577	2.36	n/a	0	n/a
Spanish Socialist Workers' Party (historical) (PSOEh)	1,819	1.20	n/a	0	n/a
Democratic Coalition (CD)	1,008	0.66	n/a	0	n/a
Communist Movement–Organization of Communist Left (MCA–OIC)	672	0.44	n/a	0	n/a
Communist Organization of Spain (Red Flag) (OCE–BR)	567	0.37	n/a	0	n/a
Workers' Revolutionary Organization (ORT)	0	0.00	n/a	0	n/a
Blank ballots	0	0.00	n/a		
Total	151,663			29	n/a
Valid votes	151,663	98.63	n/a		
Invalid votes	2,100	1.37	n/a		
Votes cast / turnout	153,763	50.65	n/a		
Abstentions	149,792	49.35	n/a		
Registered voters	303,555				

=== Marbella ===
Population: 55,537

Summary of the 3 April 1979 City Council of Marbella election results →
Parties and alliances	Popular vote			Seats	
Parties and alliances	Votes	%	±pp	Total	+/−
Spanish Socialist Workers' Party (PSOE)	3,833	24.20	n/a	6	n/a
Union of the Democratic Centre (UCD)	2,847	17.98	n/a	5	n/a
Independent Citizen Group (ACI)	2,405	15.19	n/a	4	n/a
Socialist Party of Andalusia–Andalusian Party (PSA–PA)	2,376	15.00	n/a	4	n/a
Communist Party of Spain (PCE)	1,932	12.20	n/a	3	n/a
Independent Group for Marbella (GIM)	1,384	8.74	n/a	2	n/a
Spanish Socialist Workers' Party (historical) (PSOEh)	890	5.62	n/a	1	n/a
Communist Movement–Organization of Communist Left (MCA–OIC)	112	0.71	n/a	0	n/a
Democratic Coalition (CD)	58	0.37	n/a	0	n/a
Blank ballots	0	0.00	n/a		
Total	15,837			25	n/a
Valid votes	15,837	99.25	n/a		
Invalid votes	120	0.75	n/a		
Votes cast / turnout	15,957	49.16	n/a		
Abstentions	16,500	50.84	n/a		
Registered voters	32,457				

=== Morón de la Frontera ===
Population: 28,091

Summary of the 3 April 1979 City Council of Morón de la Frontera election results →
Parties and alliances	Popular vote			Seats	
Parties and alliances	Votes	%	±pp	Total	+/−
Union of the Democratic Centre (UCD)	7,062	54.97	n/a	12	n/a
Party of Labour of Andalusia (PTA)	2,870	22.34	n/a	5	n/a
Spanish Socialist Workers' Party (PSOE)	1,524	11.86	n/a	2	n/a
Communist Party of Spain (PCE)	1,100	8.56	n/a	2	n/a
Socialist Party of Andalusia–Andalusian Party (PSA–PA)	291	2.27	n/a	0	n/a
Workers' Revolutionary Organization (ORT)	0	0.00	n/a	0	n/a
Blank ballots	0	0.00	n/a		
Total	12,847			21	n/a
Valid votes	12,847	99.17	n/a		
Invalid votes	108	0.83	n/a		
Votes cast / turnout	12,955	67.48	n/a		
Abstentions	6,244	32.52	n/a		
Registered voters	19,199				

=== Motril ===
Population: 38,617

Summary of the 3 April 1979 City Council of Motril election results →
Parties and alliances	Popular vote			Seats	
Parties and alliances	Votes	%	±pp	Total	+/−
Party of Labour of Andalusia (PTA)	4,817	30.48	n/a	7	n/a
Spanish Socialist Workers' Party (PSOE)	4,521	28.60	n/a	6	n/a
Union of the Democratic Centre (UCD)	4,277	27.06	n/a	6	n/a
Communist Party of Spain (PCE)	1,474	9.33	n/a	2	n/a
Socialist Party of Andalusia–Andalusian Party (PSA–PA)	718	4.54	n/a	0	n/a
Blank ballots	0	0.00	n/a		
Total	15,806			21	n/a
Valid votes	15,806	99.22	n/a		
Invalid votes	124	0.78	n/a		
Votes cast / turnout	15,930	64.51	n/a		
Abstentions	8,764	35.49	n/a		
Registered voters	24,694				

=== Ronda ===
Population: 31,895

Summary of the 3 April 1979 City Council of Ronda election results →
Parties and alliances	Popular vote			Seats	
Parties and alliances	Votes	%	±pp	Total	+/−
Union of the Democratic Centre (UCD)	4,396	35.49	n/a	8	n/a
Socialist Party of Andalusia–Andalusian Party (PSA–PA)	3,451	27.86	n/a	6	n/a
Spanish Socialist Workers' Party (PSOE)	2,774	22.40	n/a	5	n/a
Communist Party of Spain (PCE)	1,179	9.52	n/a	2	n/a
Independents of Ronda (IdR)	586	4.73	n/a	0	n/a
Blank ballots	0	0.00	n/a		
Total	12,386			21	n/a
Valid votes	12,386	98.61	n/a		
Invalid votes	174	1.39	n/a		
Votes cast / turnout	12,560	56.82	n/a		
Abstentions	9,545	43.18	n/a		
Registered voters	22,105				

=== San Fernando ===
Population: 67,614

Summary of the 3 April 1979 City Council of San Fernando election results →
Parties and alliances	Popular vote			Seats	
Parties and alliances	Votes	%	±pp	Total	+/−
Union of the Democratic Centre (UCD)	8,098	34.04	n/a	10	n/a
Socialist Party of Andalusia–Andalusian Party (PSA–PA)	5,937	24.95	n/a	7	n/a
Spanish Socialist Workers' Party (PSOE)	5,385	22.63	n/a	6	n/a
Communist Party of Spain (PCE)	2,425	10.19	n/a	2	n/a
Party of Labour of Andalusia (PTA)	1,090	4.58	n/a	0	n/a
Democratic Coalition (CD)	857	3.60	n/a	0	n/a
Blank ballots	0	0.00	n/a		
Total	23,792			25	n/a
Valid votes	23,792	99.20	n/a		
Invalid votes	193	0.80	n/a		
Votes cast / turnout	23,985	55.26	n/a		
Abstentions	19,421	44.74	n/a		
Registered voters	43,406				

=== Sanlúcar de Barrameda ===
Population: 47,558

Summary of the 3 April 1979 City Council of Sanlúcar de Barrameda election results →
Parties and alliances	Popular vote			Seats	
Parties and alliances	Votes	%	±pp	Total	+/−
Communist Party of Spain (PCE)	7,296	41.77	n/a	9	n/a
Union of the Democratic Centre (UCD)	4,820	27.60	n/a	6	n/a
Socialist Party of Andalusia–Andalusian Party (PSA–PA)	3,167	18.13	n/a	4	n/a
Spanish Socialist Workers' Party (PSOE)	1,758	10.07	n/a	2	n/a
Party of Labour of Andalusia (PTA)	424	2.43	n/a	0	n/a
Workers' Revolutionary Organization (ORT)	0	0.00	n/a	0	n/a
Blank ballots	0	0.00	n/a		
Total	17,465			21	n/a
Valid votes	17,465	99.28	n/a		
Invalid votes	126	0.72	n/a		
Votes cast / turnout	17,591	60.52	n/a		
Abstentions	11,474	39.48	n/a		
Registered voters	29,065				

=== Seville ===
Population: 622,532

=== Utrera ===
Population: 38,240

Summary of the 3 April 1979 City Council of Utrera election results →
Parties and alliances	Popular vote			Seats	
Parties and alliances	Votes	%	±pp	Total	+/−
Spanish Socialist Workers' Party (PSOE)	7,634	51.62	n/a	12	n/a
Union of the Democratic Centre (UCD)	2,972	20.09	n/a	4	n/a
Communist Party of Spain (PCE)	1,802	12.18	n/a	2	n/a
Socialist Party of Andalusia–Andalusian Party (PSA–PA)	1,408	9.52	n/a	2	n/a
Party of Labour of Andalusia (PTA)	974	6.59	n/a	1	n/a
Workers' Revolutionary Organization (ORT)	0	0.00	n/a	0	n/a
Blank ballots	0	0.00	n/a		
Total	14,790			21	n/a
Valid votes	14,790	99.17	n/a		
Invalid votes	124	0.83	n/a		
Votes cast / turnout	14,914	60.22	n/a		
Abstentions	9,852	39.78	n/a		
Registered voters	24,766				

=== Vélez-Málaga ===
Population: 42,532

Summary of the 3 April 1979 City Council of Vélez-Málaga election results →
Parties and alliances	Popular vote			Seats	
Parties and alliances	Votes	%	±pp	Total	+/−
Spanish Socialist Workers' Party (PSOE)	5,242	34.28	n/a	8	n/a
Union of the Democratic Centre (UCD)	3,990	26.09	n/a	6	n/a
Socialist Party of Andalusia–Andalusian Party (PSA–PA)	3,368	22.02	n/a	5	n/a
Communist Party of Spain (PCE)	1,095	7.16	n/a	1	n/a
Democratic Coalition (CD)	835	5.46	n/a	1	n/a
Party of Labour of Andalusia (PTA)	762	4.98	n/a	0	n/a
Blank ballots	0	0.00	n/a		
Total	15,292			21	n/a
Valid votes	15,292	98.26	n/a		
Invalid votes	271	1.74	n/a		
Votes cast / turnout	15,563	55.79	n/a		
Abstentions	12,334	44.21	n/a		
Registered voters	27,897				
