= 1983 Spanish local elections in Andalusia =

This article presents the results breakdown of the local elections held in Andalusia on 8 May 1983. The following tables show detailed results in the autonomous community's most populous municipalities, sorted alphabetically.

== City control ==
The following table lists party control in the most populous municipalities, including provincial capitals (highlighted in bold). Gains for a party are highlighted in that party's colour.

Municipality	Population	Previous control	New control
Alcalá de Guadaíra	45,577	Spanish Socialist Workers' Party of Andalusia (PSOE–A)	Spanish Socialist Workers' Party of Andalusia (PSOE–A)
Algeciras	85,390	Communist Party of Spain (PCE)	Spanish Socialist Workers' Party of Andalusia (PSOE–A)
**Almería**	140,745	Spanish Socialist Workers' Party of Andalusia (PSOE–A)	Spanish Socialist Workers' Party of Andalusia (PSOE–A)
Antequera	35,765	Independent Antequeran Candidacy (CAI)	Spanish Socialist Workers' Party of Andalusia (PSOE–A)
Benalmádena	13,622	Independent Group of Benalmádena (GIB)	Independent Group of Benalmádena (GIB)
**Cádiz**	156,711	Spanish Socialist Workers' Party of Andalusia (PSOE–A)	Spanish Socialist Workers' Party of Andalusia (PSOE–A)
Chiclana de la Frontera	36,492	Independent Candidacy (CI)	Spanish Socialist Workers' Party of Andalusia (PSOE–A)
**Córdoba**	279,386	Communist Party of Spain (PCE)	Communist Party of Spain (PCE)
Dos Hermanas	57,548	Communist Party of Spain (PCE)	Spanish Socialist Workers' Party of Andalusia (PSOE–A)
Écija	34,703	Socialist Party of Andalusia–Andalusian Party (PSA–PA)	Socialist Party of Andalusia–Andalusian Party (PSA–PA)
El Ejido	29,560	Union of the Democratic Centre (UCD)	Spanish Socialist Workers' Party of Andalusia (PSOE–A)
El Puerto de Santa María	55,748	Communist Party of Spain (PCE)	Communist Party of Spain (PCE) (PSOE–A in 1986)
Fuengirola	29,160	Spanish Socialist Workers' Party of Andalusia (PSOE–A)	Spanish Socialist Workers' Party of Andalusia (PSOE–A)
**Granada**	246,642	Spanish Socialist Workers' Party of Andalusia (PSOE–A)	Spanish Socialist Workers' Party of Andalusia (PSOE–A)
**Huelva**	127,822	Spanish Socialist Workers' Party of Andalusia (PSOE–A)	Spanish Socialist Workers' Party of Andalusia (PSOE–A)
**Jaén**	95,783	Spanish Socialist Workers' Party of Andalusia (PSOE–A)	Spanish Socialist Workers' Party of Andalusia (PSOE–A)
Jerez de la Frontera	175,653	Socialist Party of Andalusia–Andalusian Party (PSA–PA)	Socialist Party of Andalusia–Andalusian Party (PSA–PA)
La Línea de la Concepción	56,609	Spanish Socialist Workers' Party of Andalusia (PSOE–A)	Spanish Socialist Workers' Party of Andalusia (PSOE–A)
Linares	55,122	Spanish Socialist Workers' Party of Andalusia (PSOE–A)	Spanish Socialist Workers' Party of Andalusia (PSOE–A)
**Málaga**	502,232	Spanish Socialist Workers' Party of Andalusia (PSOE–A)	Spanish Socialist Workers' Party of Andalusia (PSOE–A)
Marbella	60,172	Spanish Socialist Workers' Party of Andalusia (PSOE–A)	Spanish Socialist Workers' Party of Andalusia (PSOE–A)
Morón de la Frontera	27,986	Union of the Democratic Centre (UCD)	Spanish Socialist Workers' Party of Andalusia (PSOE–A)
Motril	40,506	Spanish Socialist Workers' Party of Andalusia (PSOE–A)	Spanish Socialist Workers' Party of Andalusia (PSOE–A)
Ronda	30,762	Socialist Party of Andalusia–Andalusian Party (PSA–PA)	Spanish Socialist Workers' Party of Andalusia (PSOE–A)
San Fernando	72,103	Socialist Party of Andalusia–Andalusian Party (PSA–PA)	Socialist Party of Andalusia–Andalusian Party (PSA–PA) (PSOE–A in 1985)
Sanlúcar de Barrameda	48,390	Communist Party of Spain (PCE)	Communist Party of Spain (PCE)
**Seville**	645,817	Socialist Party of Andalusia–Andalusian Party (PSA–PA)	Spanish Socialist Workers' Party of Andalusia (PSOE–A)
Utrera	38,097	Spanish Socialist Workers' Party of Andalusia (PSOE–A)	Spanish Socialist Workers' Party of Andalusia (PSOE–A)
Vélez-Málaga	41,937	Spanish Socialist Workers' Party of Andalusia (PSOE–A)	Spanish Socialist Workers' Party of Andalusia (PSOE–A)

== Municipalities ==
=== Alcalá de Guadaíra ===
Population: 45,577

← Summary of the 8 May 1983 City Council of Alcalá de Guadaíra election results →
Parties and alliances	Popular vote			Seats	
Parties and alliances	Votes	%	±pp	Total	+/−
Spanish Socialist Workers' Party of Andalusia (PSOE–A)	13,279	67.42	+29.27	16	+8
People's Coalition (AP–PDP–UL)	3,270	16.60	New	3	+3
Communist Party of Spain (PCE)	2,367	12.02	−14.53	2	−4
Socialist Party of Andalusia–Andalusian Party (PSA–PA)	759	3.85	−7.01	0	−2
Union of the Democratic Centre (UCD)	n/a	n/a	−22.82	0	−5
Blank ballots	0	0.00	±0.00		
Total	19,696			21	±0
Valid votes	19,696	100.00	+0.48		
Invalid votes	0	0.00	−0.48		
Votes cast / turnout	19,696	65.96	−0.38		
Abstentions	10,165	34.04	+0.38		
Registered voters	29,861				

=== Algeciras ===
Population: 85,390

← Summary of the 8 May 1983 City Council of Algeciras election results →
Parties and alliances	Popular vote			Seats	
Parties and alliances	Votes	%	±pp	Total	+/−
Spanish Socialist Workers' Party of Andalusia (PSOE–A)	14,664	43.36	+20.41	12	+6
Communist Party of Spain (PCE)	9,268	27.41	−3.63	7	−1
People's Coalition (AP–PDP–UL)^{1}	6,376	18.85	+16.13	5	+5
Socialist Party of Andalusia–Andalusian Party (PSA–PA)	2,088	6.17	−9.31	1	−3
Independents (INDEP)	688	2.03	New	0	±0
Independents (INDEP)	431	1.27	New	0	±0
Liberal Democratic Party (PDL)	302	0.89	New	0	±0
Union of the Democratic Centre (UCD)	n/a	n/a	−25.25	0	−7
Blank ballots	0	0.00	±0.00		
Total	33,817			25	±0
Valid votes	33,817	100.00	+0.86		
Invalid votes	0	0.00	−0.86		
Votes cast / turnout	33,817	58.02	+8.51		
Abstentions	24,471	41.98	−8.51		
Registered voters	58,288				
Sources
Footnotes: ^{1} People's Coalition results are compared to Democratic Coalition totals in the 1979 election.

=== Almería ===
Population: 140,745

← Summary of the 8 May 1983 City Council of Almería election results →
Parties and alliances	Popular vote			Seats	
Parties and alliances	Votes	%	±pp	Total	+/−
Spanish Socialist Workers' Party of Andalusia (PSOE–A)	33,952	60.82	+28.30	18	+8
People's Coalition (AP–PDP–UL)^{1}	16,451	29.47	+25.79	8	+8
Communist Party of Spain (PCE)	3,590	6.43	−5.38	1	−2
Socialist Party of Andalusia–Andalusian Party (PSA–PA)	1,035	1.85	−9.13	0	−3
Independent Party of Almería (PIDA)	480	0.86	New	0	±0
Socialist Action Party (PASOC)	318	0.57	New	0	±0
Union of the Democratic Centre (UCD)	n/a	n/a	−37.02	0	−11
Blank ballots	0	0.00	±0.00		
Total	55,826			27	±0
Valid votes	55,826	100.00	+1.17		
Invalid votes	0	0.00	−1.17		
Votes cast / turnout	55,826	57.19	+0.86		
Abstentions	41,786	42.81	−0.86		
Registered voters	97,612				
Sources
Footnotes: ^{1} People's Coalition results are compared to Democratic Coalition totals in the 1979 election.

=== Antequera ===
Population: 35,765

← Summary of the 8 May 1983 City Council of Antequera election results →
Parties and alliances	Popular vote			Seats	
Parties and alliances	Votes	%	±pp	Total	+/−
Spanish Socialist Workers' Party of Andalusia (PSOE–A)	9,919	59.05	+30.16	13	+7
People's Coalition (AP–PDP–UL)	4,307	25.64	New	5	+5
Communist Party of Spain (PCE)	1,525	9.08	−4.21	2	−1
Andalusian Workers' Group (ATA)	890	5.30	New	1	+1
United Candidacy of Workers (CUT)	158	0.94	New	0	±0
Independent Antequeran Candidacy (CAI)	n/a	n/a	−37.15	0	−8
Union of the Democratic Centre (UCD)	n/a	n/a	−13.97	0	−3
Party of Labour of Andalusia (PTA)	n/a	n/a	−5.79	0	−1
Blank ballots	0	0.00	±0.00		
Total	16,799			21	±0
Valid votes	16,799	100.00	+0.98		
Invalid votes	0	0.00	−0.98		
Votes cast / turnout	16,799	58.05	−3.44		
Abstentions	12,138	41.95	+3.44		
Registered voters	28,937				

=== Benalmádena ===
Population: 13,622

← Summary of the 8 May 1983 City Council of Benalmádena election results →
Parties and alliances	Popular vote			Seats	
Parties and alliances	Votes	%	±pp	Total	+/−
Independent Group of Benalmádena (GIB)	2,569	45.23	+12.29	9	+3
Spanish Socialist Workers' Party of Andalusia (PSOE–A)	1,590	27.99	+13.05	5	+3
Independent Group (AI)	563	9.91	New	2	+2
Arroyo de la Miel and Benalmádena Popular Candidacy (CPAB)	295	5.19	New	1	+1
People's Coalition (AP–PDP–UL)^{1}	203	3.57	+3.57	0	±0
Communist Party of Spain (PCE–PCA)	200	3.52	−24.14	0	−5
United Candidacy of Workers (CUT)	177	3.12	New	0	±0
Socialist Party of Andalusia–Andalusian Party (PSA–PA)	83	1.46	New	0	±0
Union of the Democratic Centre (UCD)	n/a	n/a	−16.18	0	−3
Party of Labour of Andalusia–Andalusian Federation (PTA–FA)	n/a	n/a	−8.28	0	−1
Blank ballots	0	0.00	±0.00		
Total	5,680			17	±0
Valid votes	5,680	100.00	+6.19		
Invalid votes	0	0.00	−6.19		
Votes cast / turnout	5,680	66.97	−0.41		
Abstentions	2,802	33.03	+0.41		
Registered voters	8,482				
Sources
Footnotes: ^{1} People's Coalition results are compared to Democratic Coalition totals in the 1979 election.

=== Cádiz ===
Population: 156,711

← Summary of the 8 May 1983 City Council of Cádiz election results →
Parties and alliances	Popular vote			Seats	
Parties and alliances	Votes	%	±pp	Total	+/−
Spanish Socialist Workers' Party of Andalusia (PSOE–A)	34,107	59.46	+26.92	18	+9
People's Coalition (AP–PDP–UL)	18,286	31.88	New	9	+9
Communist Party of Spain (PCE)	2,058	3.59	−3.77	0	−2
Socialist Party of Andalusia–Andalusian Party (PSA–PA)	880	1.53	−15.20	0	−4
Democratic and Social Centre (CDS)	827	1.44	New	0	±0
Workers' Socialist Party (PST)	652	1.14	New	0	±0
Liberal Democratic Party (PDL)	553	0.96	New	0	±0
Union of the Democratic Centre (UCD)	n/a	n/a	−41.46	0	−12
Blank ballots	0	0.00	±0.00		
Total	57,363			27	±0
Valid votes	57,363	100.00	+1.78		
Invalid votes	0	0.00	−1.78		
Votes cast / turnout	57,363	50.66	+0.23		
Abstentions	55,865	49.34	−0.23		
Registered voters	113,228				

=== Chiclana de la Frontera ===
Population: 36,492

← Summary of the 8 May 1983 City Council of Chiclana de la Frontera election results →
Parties and alliances	Popular vote			Seats	
Parties and alliances	Votes	%	±pp	Total	+/−
Spanish Socialist Workers' Party of Andalusia (PSOE–A)	8,851	66.61	+41.78	15	+9
Independents (INDEP)	1,475	11.10	New	2	+2
People's Coalition (AP–PDP–UL)^{1}	1,217	9.16	+6.80	2	+2
Independents (INDEP)	789	5.94	New	1	+1
Communist Party of Spain (PCE)	734	5.52	−8.65	1	−2
Socialist Party of Andalusia–Andalusian Party (PSA–PA)	221	1.66	New	0	±0
Independent Candidacy (CI)	n/a	n/a	−36.44	0	−8
Union of the Democratic Centre (UCD)	n/a	n/a	−16.19	0	−3
Party of Labour of Andalusia (PTA)	n/a	n/a	−6.02	0	−1
Blank ballots	0	0.00	±0.00		
Total	13,287			21	±0
Valid votes	13,287	100.00	+0.37		
Invalid votes	0	0.00	−0.37		
Votes cast / turnout	13,287	56.92	−2.67		
Abstentions	10,055	43.08	+2.67		
Registered voters	23,342				
Sources
Footnotes: ^{1} People's Coalition results are compared to Democratic Coalition totals in the 1979 election.

=== Córdoba ===
Population: 279,386

← Summary of the 8 May 1983 City Council of Córdoba election results →
Parties and alliances	Popular vote			Seats	
Parties and alliances	Votes	%	±pp	Total	+/−
Communist Party of Spain (PCE)	79,685	57.97	+29.93	17	+9
People's Coalition (AP–PDP–UL)	32,263	23.47	New	6	+6
Spanish Socialist Workers' Party of Andalusia (PSOE–A)	21,476	15.62	−7.97	4	−3
Democratic and Social Centre (CDS)	1,980	1.44	New	0	±0
Socialist Party of Andalusia–Andalusian Party (PSA–PA)	1,580	1.15	−16.01	0	−5
Workers' Socialist Party (PST)	478	0.35	New	0	±0
Union of the Democratic Centre (UCD)	n/a	n/a	−25.93	0	−7
Blank ballots	0	0.00	±0.00		
Total	137,462			27	±0
Valid votes	137,462	100.00	±0.00		
Invalid votes	0	0.00	±0.00		
Votes cast / turnout	137,462	69.29	+4.72		
Abstentions	60,911	30.71	−4.72		
Registered voters	198,373				

=== Dos Hermanas ===
Population: 57,548

← Summary of the 8 May 1983 City Council of Dos Hermanas election results →
Parties and alliances	Popular vote			Seats	
Parties and alliances	Votes	%	±pp	Total	+/−
Spanish Socialist Workers' Party of Andalusia (PSOE–A)	12,443	52.29	+22.49	13	+6
Communist Party of Spain (PCE)	7,203	30.27	−9.33	8	−1
People's Coalition (AP–PDP–UL)	3,567	14.99	New	4	+4
Socialist Party of Andalusia–Andalusian Party (PSA–PA)	585	2.46	−5.86	0	−2
Union of the Democratic Centre (UCD)	n/a	n/a	−12.41	0	−2
Independent Democrats Group (ADI)	n/a	n/a	−8.08	0	−1
Blank ballots	0	0.00	±0.00		
Total	23,798			25	+4
Valid votes	23,798	100.00	+0.42		
Invalid votes	0	0.00	−0.42		
Votes cast / turnout	23,798	63.76	+0.58		
Abstentions	13,528	36.24	−0.58		
Registered voters	37,326				

=== Écija ===
Population: 34,703

← Summary of the 8 May 1983 City Council of Écija election results →
Parties and alliances	Popular vote			Seats	
Parties and alliances	Votes	%	±pp	Total	+/−
Socialist Party of Andalusia–Andalusian Party (PSA–PA)	5,953	36.60	−12.67	8	−3
Spanish Socialist Workers' Party of Andalusia (PSOE–A)	5,361	32.96	+22.46	7	+5
People's Coalition (AP–PDP–UL)^{1}	4,176	25.68	+16.98	6	+4
Communist Party of Spain (PCE)	773	4.75	−4.16	0	−2
Union of the Democratic Centre (UCD)	n/a	n/a	−21.18	0	−4
Blank ballots	0	0.00	±0.00		
Total	16,263			21	±0
Valid votes	16,263	100.00	+0.52		
Invalid votes	0	0.00	−0.52		
Votes cast / turnout	16,263	68.35	+6.73		
Abstentions	7,530	31.65	−6.73		
Registered voters	23,793				
Sources
Footnotes: ^{1} People's Coalition results are compared to Democratic Coalition totals in the 1979 election.

=== El Ejido ===
Population: 29,560

← Summary of the 8 May 1983 City Council of El Ejido election results →
Parties and alliances	Popular vote			Seats	
Parties and alliances	Votes	%	±pp	Total	+/−
Spanish Socialist Workers' Party of Andalusia (PSOE–A)	4,740	54.71	+22.08	12	+5
People's Coalition (AP–PDP–UL)	1,593	18.39	New	4	+4
Independents (INDEP)	1,521	17.56	+2.10	4	+1
Communist Party of Spain (PCE)	475	5.48	−12.86	1	−3
Socialist Action Party (PASOC)	335	3.87	New	0	±0
Union of the Democratic Centre (UCD)	n/a	n/a	−33.57	0	−7
Blank ballots	0	0.00	±0.00		
Total	8,664			21	±0
Valid votes	8,664	100.00	+1.31		
Invalid votes	0	0.00	−1.31		
Votes cast / turnout	8,664	45.93	−0.09		
Abstentions	10,200	54.07	+0.09		
Registered voters	18,864				

=== El Puerto de Santa María ===
Population: 55,748

← Summary of the 8 May 1983 City Council of El Puerto de Santa María election results →
Parties and alliances	Popular vote			Seats	
Parties and alliances	Votes	%	±pp	Total	+/−
Communist Party of Spain (PCE)	6,139	33.25	+8.07	9	+2
Spanish Socialist Workers' Party of Andalusia (PSOE–A)	5,206	28.20	+7.42	8	+3
People's Coalition (AP–PDP–UL)^{1}	4,945	26.79	+21.01	7	+6
Independents (INDEP)	1,174	6.36	New	1	+1
Socialist Party of Andalusia–Andalusian Party (PSA–PA)	607	3.29	−14.01	0	−4
Democratic and Social Centre (CDS)	390	2.11	New	0	±0
Union of the Democratic Centre (UCD)	n/a	n/a	−30.25	0	−8
Blank ballots	0	0.00	±0.00		
Total	18,461			25	±0
Valid votes	18,461	100.00	+0.51		
Invalid votes	0	0.00	−0.51		
Votes cast / turnout	18,461	50.16	−1.83		
Abstentions	18,346	49.84	+1.83		
Registered voters	36,807				
Sources
Footnotes: ^{1} People's Coalition results are compared to Democratic Coalition totals in the 1979 election.

=== Fuengirola ===
Population: 29,160

← Summary of the 8 May 1983 City Council of Fuengirola election results →
Parties and alliances	Popular vote			Seats	
Parties and alliances	Votes	%	±pp	Total	+/−
Spanish Socialist Workers' Party of Andalusia (PSOE–A)	7,710	64.21	+21.23	15	+5
People's Coalition (AP–PDP–UL)^{1}	2,890	24.07	+22.12	5	+5
Communist Party of Spain (PCE)	604	5.03	−5.56	1	−1
Democratic and Social Centre (CDS)	423	3.52	New	0	±0
Socialist Party of Andalusia–Andalusian Party (PSA–PA)	380	3.16	New	0	±0
Union of the Democratic Centre (UCD)	n/a	n/a	−37.96	0	−9
Blank ballots	0	0.00	±0.00		
Total	12,007			21	±0
Valid votes	12,007	100.00	+0.71		
Invalid votes	0	0.00	−0.71		
Votes cast / turnout	12,007	63.38	−0.04		
Abstentions	6,937	36.62	+0.04		
Registered voters	18,944				
Sources
Footnotes: ^{1} People's Coalition results are compared to Democratic Coalition totals in the 1979 election.

=== Granada ===
Population: 246,642

← Summary of the 8 May 1983 City Council of Granada election results →
Parties and alliances	Popular vote			Seats	
Parties and alliances	Votes	%	±pp	Total	+/−
Spanish Socialist Workers' Party of Andalusia (PSOE–A)	69,530	60.41	+39.09	18	+12
People's Coalition (AP–PDP–UL)	34,773	30.21	New	9	+9
Communist Party of Spain (PCE)	5,114	4.44	−7.00	0	−3
Democratic and Social Centre (CDS)	2,012	1.75	New	0	±0
MEC (MEC)	1,222	1.06	New	0	±0
Liberal Democratic Party (PDL)	956	0.83	New	0	±0
Granadan Candidacy of Workers (CGT)	765	0.66	−5.22	0	−1
Socialist Party of Andalusia–Andalusian Party (PSA–PA)	726	0.63	−21.96	0	−6
Union of the Democratic Centre (UCD)	n/a	n/a	−36.19	0	−11
Blank ballots	0	0.00	±0.00		
Total	115,098			27	±0
Valid votes	115,098	100.00	+0.89		
Invalid votes	0	0.00	−0.89		
Votes cast / turnout	115,098	66.30	+5.37		
Abstentions	58,499	33.70	−5.37		
Registered voters	173,597				

=== Huelva ===
Population: 127,822

← Summary of the 8 May 1983 City Council of Huelva election results →
Parties and alliances	Popular vote			Seats	
Parties and alliances	Votes	%	±pp	Total	+/−
Spanish Socialist Workers' Party of Andalusia (PSOE–A)	30,680	64.54	+39.75	20	+13
People's Coalition (AP–PDP–UL)	10,694	22.50	New	7	+7
Communist Party of Spain (PCE)	1,847	3.89	−3.40	0	−2
Independent Group of Huelva (GIH)	1,404	2.95	−5.59	0	−2
Democratic and Social Centre (CDS)	779	1.64	New	0	±0
Workers' Socialist Party (PST)	723	1.52	New	0	±0
Socialist Party of Andalusia–Andalusian Party (PSA–PA)	695	1.46	−19.27	0	−6
Liberal Democratic Party (PDL)	405	0.85	New	0	±0
United Candidacy of Workers (CUT)	312	0.66	New	0	±0
Union of the Democratic Centre (UCD)	n/a	n/a	−29.34	0	−8
Workers' Revolutionary Organization (ORT)	n/a	n/a	−9.30	0	−2
Blank ballots	0	0.00	±0.00		
Total	47,539			27	±0
Valid votes	47,539	100.00	+1.76		
Invalid votes	0	0.00	−1.76		
Votes cast / turnout	47,539	54.05	+2.21		
Abstentions	40,415	45.95	−2.21		
Registered voters	87,954				

=== Jaén ===
Population: 95,783

← Summary of the 8 May 1983 City Council of Jaén election results →
Parties and alliances	Popular vote			Seats	
Parties and alliances	Votes	%	±pp	Total	+/−
Spanish Socialist Workers' Party of Andalusia (PSOE–A)	23,943	52.27	+25.22	14	+7
People's Coalition (AP–PDP–UL)^{1}	17,423	38.04	+31.47	10	+9
Communist Party of Spain (PCE)	2,452	5.35	−6.58	1	−2
Democratic and Social Centre (CDS)	1,017	2.22	New	0	±0
Socialist Party of Andalusia–Andalusian Party (PSA–PA)	968	2.11	−13.20	0	−4
Union of the Democratic Centre (UCD)	n/a	n/a	−35.80	0	−10
Blank ballots	0	0.00	±0.00		
Total	45,803			25	±0
Valid votes	45,803	100.00	+0.75		
Invalid votes	0	0.00	−0.75		
Votes cast / turnout	45,803	67.61	+2.93		
Abstentions	21,944	32.39	−2.93		
Registered voters	67,747				
Sources
Footnotes: ^{1} People's Coalition results are compared to Democratic Coalition totals in the 1979 election.

=== Jerez de la Frontera ===
Population: 175,653

← Summary of the 8 May 1983 City Council of Jerez de la Frontera election results →
Parties and alliances	Popular vote			Seats	
Parties and alliances	Votes	%	±pp	Total	+/−
Socialist Party of Andalusia–Andalusian Party (PSA–PA)	39,231	54.58	+26.47	16	+8
Spanish Socialist Workers' Party of Andalusia (PSOE–A)	19,312	26.87	+6.21	7	+1
People's Coalition (AP–PDP–UL)^{1}	10,260	14.27	+12.53	4	+4
Communist Party of Spain (PCE)	2,611	3.63	−18.15	0	−6
Liberal Democratic Party (PDL)	461	0.64	New	0	±0
Union of the Democratic Centre (UCD)	n/a	n/a	−26.08	0	−7
Blank ballots	0	0.00	±0.00		
Total	71,875			27	±0
Valid votes	71,875	100.00	+0.79		
Invalid votes	0	0.00	−0.79		
Votes cast / turnout	71,875	64.62	+9.33		
Abstentions	39,355	35.38	−9.33		
Registered voters	111,230				
Sources
Footnotes: ^{1} People's Coalition results are compared to Democratic Coalition totals in the 1979 election.

=== La Línea de la Concepción ===
Population: 56,609

← Summary of the 8 May 1983 City Council of La Línea de la Concepción election results →
Parties and alliances	Popular vote			Seats	
Parties and alliances	Votes	%	±pp	Total	+/−
Spanish Socialist Workers' Party of Andalusia (PSOE–A)	18,602	79.71	+32.13	22	+9
People's Coalition (AP–PDP–UL)^{1}	2,869	12.29	+11.22	3	+3
Communist Party of Spain (PCE)	637	2.73	−5.73	0	−2
Socialist Party of Andalusia–Andalusian Party (PSA–PA)	625	2.68	−7.94	0	−2
Communist Movement (MC)	604	2.59	−2.67	0	−1
Union of the Democratic Centre (UCD)	n/a	n/a	−27.01	0	−7
Blank ballots	0	0.00	±0.00		
Total	23,337			25	±0
Valid votes	23,337	100.00	+0.85		
Invalid votes	0	0.00	−0.85		
Votes cast / turnout	23,337	58.83	−0.07		
Abstentions	16,334	41.17	+0.07		
Registered voters	39,671				
Sources
Footnotes: ^{1} People's Coalition results are compared to Democratic Coalition totals in the 1979 election.

=== Linares ===
Population: 55,122

← Summary of the 8 May 1983 City Council of Linares election results →
Parties and alliances	Popular vote			Seats	
Parties and alliances	Votes	%	±pp	Total	+/−
Spanish Socialist Workers' Party of Andalusia (PSOE–A)	16,702	61.76	+21.63	16	+6
People's Coalition (AP–PDP–UL)	6,051	22.37	+15.00	6	+4
Communist Party of Spain (PCE)	3,788	14.01	−9.65	3	−3
Socialist Party of Andalusia–Andalusian Party (PSA–PA)	503	1.86	New	0	±0
Union of the Democratic Centre (UCD)	n/a	n/a	−26.94	0	−7
Blank ballots	0	0.00	±0.00		
Total	27,044			25	±0
Valid votes	27,044	100.00	+0.94		
Invalid votes	0	0.00	−0.94		
Votes cast / turnout	27,044	71.02	+4.11		
Abstentions	11,037	28.98	−4.11		
Registered voters	38,081				
Sources
Footnotes: ^{1} People's Coalition results are compared to Democratic Coalition totals in the 1979 election.

=== Málaga ===
Population: 502,232

← Summary of the 8 May 1983 City Council of Málaga election results →
Parties and alliances	Popular vote			Seats	
Parties and alliances	Votes	%	±pp	Total	+/−
Spanish Socialist Workers' Party of Andalusia (PSOE–A)	119,436	63.30	+29.13	21	+10
People's Coalition (AP–PDP–UL)^{1}	48,323	25.61	+24.95	8	+8
Communist Party of Spain (PCE)	13,554	7.18	−13.43	2	−5
Socialist Party of Andalusia–Andalusian Party (PSA–PA)	3,692	1.96	−12.66	0	−4
Democratic and Social Centre (CDS)	2,407	1.28	New	0	±0
Spanish Communist Workers' Party (PCOE)	1,275	0.68	New	0	±0
Union of the Democratic Centre (UCD)	n/a	n/a	−21.26	0	−7
Blank ballots	0	0.00	±0.00		
Total	188,687			31	+2
Valid votes	188,687	100.00	+1.37		
Invalid votes	0	0.00	−1.37		
Votes cast / turnout	188,687	56.18	+5.53		
Abstentions	147,184	43.82	−5.53		
Registered voters	335,871				
Sources
Footnotes: ^{1} People's Coalition results are compared to Democratic Coalition totals in the 1979 election.

=== Marbella ===
Population: 60,172

← Summary of the 8 May 1983 City Council of Marbella election results →
Parties and alliances	Popular vote			Seats	
Parties and alliances	Votes	%	±pp	Total	+/−
Spanish Socialist Workers' Party of Andalusia (PSOE–A)	10,761	52.05	+27.85	16	+10
People's Coalition (AP–PDP–UL)^{1}	3,634	17.58	+17.21	5	+5
Socialist Action Party (PASOC)^{2}	1,973	9.54	+3.92	2	+1
Independent Group for Marbella (GIM)	1,422	6.88	−1.86	2	±0
Communist Party of Andalusia (PCA–PCE)	908	4.39	−7.81	0	−3
Democratic and Social Centre (CDS)	761	3.68	New	0	±0
Socialist Party of Andalusia–Andalusian Party (PSA–PA)	641	3.10	−11.90	0	−4
Independent Group for the Progress of Marbellan People (AIPM)	337	1.63	New	0	±0
United Candidacy of Workers (CUT)	145	0.70	New	0	±0
Falangist Movement of Spain (MFE)	93	0.45	New	0	±0
Union of the Democratic Centre (UCD)	n/a	n/a	−17.98	0	−5
Independent Citizen Group (ACI)	n/a	n/a	−15.19	0	−4
Blank ballots	0	0.00	±0.00		
Total	20,675			25	±0
Valid votes	20,675	100.00	+75		
Invalid votes	0	0.00	−0.75		
Votes cast / turnout	20,675	60.22	+11.06		
Abstentions	13,656	39.78	−11.06		
Registered voters	34,331				
Sources
Footnotes: ^{1} People's Coalition results are compared to Democratic Coalition totals in the 1979 election.; ^{2} Socialist Action Party results are compared to Spanish Socialist Workers' Party (historical) totals in the 1979 election.

=== Morón de la Frontera ===
Population: 27,986

← Summary of the 8 May 1983 City Council of Morón de la Frontera election results →
Parties and alliances	Popular vote			Seats	
Parties and alliances	Votes	%	±pp	Total	+/−
Spanish Socialist Workers' Party of Andalusia (PSOE–A)	7,211	58.67	+46.81	13	+11
Independents (INDEP)	2,181	17.74	New	4	+4
Communist Party of Spain (PCE)	1,213	9.87	+1.31	2	±0
Independents (INDEP)	892	7.26	New	1	+1
People's Coalition (AP–PDP–UL)	794	6.46	New	1	+1
Union of the Democratic Centre (UCD)	n/a	n/a	−54.97	0	−12
Party of Labour of Andalusia (PTA)	n/a	n/a	−22.34	0	−5
Blank ballots	0	0.00	±0.00		
Total	12,291			21	±0
Valid votes	12,291	100.00	+0.83		
Invalid votes	0	0.00	−0.83		
Votes cast / turnout	12,291	63.64	−3.84		
Abstentions	7,023	36.36	+3.84		
Registered voters	19,314				

=== Motril ===
Population: 40,506

← Summary of the 8 May 1983 City Council of Motril election results →
Parties and alliances	Popular vote			Seats	
Parties and alliances	Votes	%	±pp	Total	+/−
Spanish Socialist Workers' Party of Andalusia (PSOE–A)	13,245	70.88	+42.28	16	+10
People's Coalition (AP–PDP–UL)	2,838	15.19	New	3	+3
Independents (INDEP)	1,582	8.47	New	1	+1
Communist Party of Spain (PCE)	1,022	5.47	−3.86	1	−1
Party of Labour of Andalusia (PTA)	n/a	n/a	−30.48	0	−7
Union of the Democratic Centre (UCD)	n/a	n/a	−27.06	0	−6
Blank ballots	0	0.00	±0.00		
Total	18,687			21	±0
Valid votes	18,687	100.00	+0.78		
Invalid votes	0	0.00	−0.78		
Votes cast / turnout	18,687	67.88	+3.37		
Abstentions	8,844	32.12	−3.37		
Registered voters	27,531				

=== Ronda ===
Population: 30,762

← Summary of the 8 May 1983 City Council of Ronda election results →
Parties and alliances	Popular vote			Seats	
Parties and alliances	Votes	%	±pp	Total	+/−
Spanish Socialist Workers' Party of Andalusia (PSOE–A)	6,478	50.73	+28.33	11	+6
People's Coalition (AP–PDP–UL)	2,953	23.13	New	5	+5
Socialist Party of Andalusia–Andalusian Party (PSA–PA)	2,532	19.83	−8.03	4	−2
Communist Party of Spain (PCE)	806	6.31	−3.21	1	−1
Union of the Democratic Centre (UCD)	n/a	n/a	−35.49	0	−8
Blank ballots	0	0.00	±0.00		
Total	12,769			21	±0
Valid votes	12,769	100.00	+1.39		
Invalid votes	0	0.00	−1.39		
Votes cast / turnout	12,769	56.02	−0.80		
Abstentions	10,023	43.98	+0.80		
Registered voters	22,792				

=== San Fernando ===
Population: 72,103

← Summary of the 8 May 1983 City Council of San Fernando election results →
Parties and alliances	Popular vote			Seats	
Parties and alliances	Votes	%	±pp	Total	+/−
Spanish Socialist Workers' Party of Andalusia (PSOE–A)	8,925	35.38	+12.75	9	+3
Socialist Party of Andalusia–Andalusian Party (PSA–PA)	8,679	34.40	+9.45	9	+2
People's Coalition (AP–PDP–UL)^{1}	5,746	22.78	+19.18	6	+6
Communist Party of Spain (PCE)	1,282	5.08	−5.11	1	−1
Liberal Democratic Party (PDL)	594	2.35	New	0	±0
Union of the Democratic Centre (UCD)	n/a	n/a	−34.04	0	−10
Blank ballots	0	0.00	±0.00		
Total	25,226			25	±0
Valid votes	25,226	100.00	+0.20		
Invalid votes	0	0.00	−0.80		
Votes cast / turnout	25,226	52.03	−3.23		
Abstentions	23,526	47.97	+3.23		
Registered voters	48,482				
Sources
Footnotes: ^{1} People's Coalition results are compared to Democratic Coalition totals in the 1979 election.

=== Sanlúcar de Barrameda ===
Population: 48,390

← Summary of the 8 May 1983 City Council of Sanlúcar de Barrameda election results →
Parties and alliances	Popular vote			Seats	
Parties and alliances	Votes	%	±pp	Total	+/−
Communist Party of Spain (PCE)	9,994	55.05	+13.28	12	+3
Spanish Socialist Workers' Party of Andalusia (PSOE–A)	4,625	25.48	+15.41	6	+4
People's Coalition (AP–PDP–UL)	2,827	15.57	New	3	+3
Democratic and Social Centre (CDS)	490	2.70	New	0	±0
Independents (INDEP)	217	1.20	New	0	±0
Union of the Democratic Centre (UCD)	n/a	n/a	−27.60	0	−6
Socialist Party of Andalusia–Andalusian Party (PSA–PA)	n/a	n/a	−18.13	0	−4
Blank ballots	0	0.00	±0.00		
Total	18,153			21	±0
Valid votes	18,153	100.00	+0.72		
Invalid votes	0	0.00	−0.72		
Votes cast / turnout	18,153	55.80	−4.72		
Abstentions	14,382	44.20	+4.72		
Registered voters	32,535				

=== Seville ===
Population: 645,817

=== Utrera ===
Population: 38,097

← Summary of the 8 May 1983 City Council of Utrera election results →
Parties and alliances	Popular vote			Seats	
Parties and alliances	Votes	%	±pp	Total	+/−
Spanish Socialist Workers' Party of Andalusia (PSOE–A)	11,534	65.72	+14.10	19	+7
People's Coalition (AP–PDP–UL)	1,909	10.88	New	2	+2
Communist Party of Spain (PCE)	780	4.44	−7.74	0	−2
Socialist Party of Andalusia–Andalusian Party (PSA–PA)	326	1.86	−7.66	0	−2
Union of the Democratic Centre (UCD)	n/a	n/a	−20.09	0	−4
Party of Labour of Andalusia (PTA)	n/a	n/a	−6.59	0	−1
Blank ballots	0	0.00	±0.00		
Total	14,549			21	±0
Valid votes	14,549	100.00	+0.83		
Invalid votes	0	0.00	−0.83		
Votes cast / turnout	14,549	56.15	−4.07		
Abstentions	11,361	43.85	+4.07		
Registered voters	25,910				

=== Vélez-Málaga ===
Population: 41,937

← Summary of the 8 May 1983 City Council of Vélez-Málaga election results →
Parties and alliances	Popular vote			Seats	
Parties and alliances	Votes	%	±pp	Total	+/−
Spanish Socialist Workers' Party of Andalusia (PSOE–A)	10,999	60.21	+25.93	14	+6
People's Coalition (AP–PDP–UL)^{1}	3,657	20.02	+14.56	4	+3
Socialist Party of Andalusia–Andalusian Party (PSA–PA)	1,467	8.03	−13.99	1	−4
Communist Party of Spain (PCE)	1,166	6.38	−0.78	1	±0
Independent Group for the Progress of Malagenean People (AIPM)	980	5.36	New	1	+1
Union of the Democratic Centre (UCD)	n/a	n/a	−26.09	0	−6
Blank ballots	0	0.00	±0.00		
Total	18,269			21	±0
Valid votes	18,269	100.00	+1.74		
Invalid votes	0	0.00	−1.74		
Votes cast / turnout	18,269	61.98	+6.19		
Abstentions	11,206	38.02	−6.19		
Registered voters	29,475				
Sources
Footnotes: ^{1} People's Coalition results are compared to Democratic Coalition totals in the 1979 election.
