= 1987 Spanish local elections in Andalusia =

This article presents the results breakdown of the local elections held in Andalusia on 10 June 1987. The following tables show detailed results in the autonomous community's most populous municipalities, sorted alphabetically.

== City control ==
The following table lists party control in the most populous municipalities, including provincial capitals (highlighted in bold). Gains for a party are highlighted in that party's colour.

Municipality	Population	Previous control	New control
Alcalá de Guadaíra	50,181	Spanish Socialist Workers' Party of Andalusia (PSOE–A)	Spanish Socialist Workers' Party of Andalusia (PSOE–A)
Algeciras	96,882	Spanish Socialist Workers' Party of Andalusia (PSOE–A)	Spanish Socialist Workers' Party of Andalusia (PSOE–A)
**Almería**	153,592	Spanish Socialist Workers' Party of Andalusia (PSOE–A)	Spanish Socialist Workers' Party of Andalusia (PSOE–A)
Antequera	40,732	Spanish Socialist Workers' Party of Andalusia (PSOE–A)	Spanish Socialist Workers' Party of Andalusia (PSOE–A)
Benalmádena	19,727	Independent Group of Benalmádena, Arroyo and Costa (GIBAC)	Independent Group of Benalmádena, Arroyo and Costa (GIBAC)
**Cádiz**	155,299	Spanish Socialist Workers' Party of Andalusia (PSOE–A)	Spanish Socialist Workers' Party of Andalusia (PSOE–A)
Chiclana de la Frontera	41,677	Spanish Socialist Workers' Party of Andalusia (PSOE–A)	Spanish Socialist Workers' Party of Andalusia (PSOE–A)
**Córdoba**	295,290	United Left–Assembly for Andalusia (IU–CA)	United Left–Assembly for Andalusia (IU–CA)
Dos Hermanas	66,819	Spanish Socialist Workers' Party of Andalusia (PSOE–A)	Spanish Socialist Workers' Party of Andalusia (PSOE–A)
Écija	35,161	Andalusian Party (PA)	Spanish Socialist Workers' Party of Andalusia (PSOE–A)
El Ejido	36,335	Spanish Socialist Workers' Party of Andalusia (PSOE–A)	Spanish Socialist Workers' Party of Andalusia (PSOE–A)
El Puerto de Santa María	60,638	Spanish Socialist Workers' Party of Andalusia (PSOE–A)	Spanish Socialist Workers' Party of Andalusia (PSOE–A)
Fuengirola	34,008	Spanish Socialist Workers' Party of Andalusia (PSOE–A)	Spanish Socialist Workers' Party of Andalusia (PSOE–A)
**Granada**	256,073	Spanish Socialist Workers' Party of Andalusia (PSOE–A)	Spanish Socialist Workers' Party of Andalusia (PSOE–A)
**Huelva**	135,210	Spanish Socialist Workers' Party of Andalusia (PSOE–A)	Spanish Socialist Workers' Party of Andalusia (PSOE–A)
**Jaén**	102,933	Spanish Socialist Workers' Party of Andalusia (PSOE–A)	Spanish Socialist Workers' Party of Andalusia (PSOE–A) (PP in 1989)
Jerez de la Frontera	179,191	Andalusian Party (PA)	Andalusian Party (PA)
La Línea de la Concepción	58,779	Spanish Socialist Workers' Party of Andalusia (PSOE–A)	Spanish Socialist Workers' Party of Andalusia (PSOE–A)
Linares	57,401	Spanish Socialist Workers' Party of Andalusia (PSOE–A)	Spanish Socialist Workers' Party of Andalusia (PSOE–A)
**Málaga**	563,332	Spanish Socialist Workers' Party of Andalusia (PSOE–A)	Spanish Socialist Workers' Party of Andalusia (PSOE–A)
Marbella	74,807	Spanish Socialist Workers' Party of Andalusia (PSOE–A)	Spanish Socialist Workers' Party of Andalusia (PSOE–A)
Morón de la Frontera	28,439	Spanish Socialist Workers' Party of Andalusia (PSOE–A)	People's Alliance (AP)
Motril	44,482	Spanish Socialist Workers' Party of Andalusia (PSOE–A)	Spanish Socialist Workers' Party of Andalusia (PSOE–A)
Ronda	31,971	Spanish Socialist Workers' Party of Andalusia (PSOE–A)	Spanish Socialist Workers' Party of Andalusia (PSOE–A)
San Fernando	80,057	Spanish Socialist Workers' Party of Andalusia (PSOE–A)	Spanish Socialist Workers' Party of Andalusia (PSOE–A) (PA in 1989)
Sanlúcar de Barrameda	53,017	United Left–Assembly for Andalusia (IU–CA)	United Left–Assembly for Andalusia (IU–CA) (PSOE–A in 1987)
**Seville**	651,084	Spanish Socialist Workers' Party of Andalusia (PSOE–A)	Spanish Socialist Workers' Party of Andalusia (PSOE–A)
Utrera	40,736	Spanish Socialist Workers' Party of Andalusia (PSOE–A)	Spanish Socialist Workers' Party of Andalusia (PSOE–A)
Vélez-Málaga	50,438	Spanish Socialist Workers' Party of Andalusia (PSOE–A)	Spanish Socialist Workers' Party of Andalusia (PSOE–A)

== Municipalities ==
=== Alcalá de Guadaíra ===
Population: 50,181

← Summary of the 10 June 1987 City Council of Alcalá de Guadaíra election results →
Parties and alliances	Popular vote			Seats	
Parties and alliances	Votes	%	±pp	Total	+/−
Spanish Socialist Workers' Party of Andalusia (PSOE–A)	13,396	64.36	−3.06	18	+2
Andalusian Party (PA)	3,889	18.68	+14.83	5	+5
United Left–Assembly for Andalusia (IU–CA)^{1}	2,147	10.31	−1.71	2	±0
Workers' Party of Spain–Communist Unity (PTE–UC)	839	4.03	New	0	±0
People's Democratic Party (PDP)	313	1.50	New	0	±0
People's Alliance (AP)^{2}	n/a	n/a	−16.60	0	−3
Blank ballots	231	1.11	+1.11		
Total	20,815			25	+4
Valid votes	20,815	98.89	−1.11		
Invalid votes	234	1.11	+1.11		
Votes cast / turnout	21,049	63.35	−2.61		
Abstentions	12,178	36.65	+2.61		
Registered voters	33,227				
Sources
Footnotes: ^{1} United Left–Assembly for Andalusia results are compared to Communist Party of Spain totals in the 1983 election.; ^{2} People's Alliance results are compared to People's Coalition totals in the 1983 election.

=== Algeciras ===
Population: 96,882

← Summary of the 10 June 1987 City Council of Algeciras election results →
Parties and alliances	Popular vote			Seats	
Parties and alliances	Votes	%	±pp	Total	+/−
Spanish Socialist Workers' Party of Andalusia (PSOE–A)	16,577	45.01	+1.65	13	+1
People's Alliance (AP)^{1}	5,124	13.91	−4.94	4	−1
Andalusian Liberation (LA)	4,799	13.03	New	3	+3
United Left–Assembly for Andalusia (IU–CA)^{2}	3,637	9.88	−17.53	2	−5
Andalusian Party (PA)	2,914	7.91	+1.74	2	+1
Democratic and Social Centre (CDS)	2,440	6.63	New	1	+1
People's Democratic Party (PDP)	879	2.39	New	0	±0
Humanist Platform (PH)	72	0.20	New	0	±0
Blank ballots	385	1.05	+1.05		
Total	36,827			25	±0
Valid votes	36,827	98.68	−1.32		
Invalid votes	493	1.32	+1.32		
Votes cast / turnout	37,320	57.31	−0.71		
Abstentions	27,799	42.69	+0.71		
Registered voters	65,119				
Sources
Footnotes: ^{1} People's Alliance results are compared to People's Coalition totals in the 1983 election.; ^{2} United Left–Assembly for Andalusia results are compared to Communist Party of Spain totals in the 1983 election.

=== Almería ===
Population: 153,592

← Summary of the 10 June 1987 City Council of Almería election results →
Parties and alliances	Popular vote			Seats	
Parties and alliances	Votes	%	±pp	Total	+/−
Spanish Socialist Workers' Party of Andalusia (PSOE–A)	25,695	40.30	−20.52	12	−6
People's Alliance (AP)^{1}	16,756	26.28	−3.19	8	±0
Democratic and Social Centre (CDS)	9,293	14.58	New	4	+4
United Left–Assembly for Andalusia (IU–CA)^{2}	8,077	12.67	+6.24	3	+2
Andalusian Party (PA)	1,861	2.92	+1.07	0	±0
People's Democratic Party (PDP)	861	1.35	New	0	±0
Workers' Party of Spain–Communist Unity (PTE–UC)	704	1.10	New	0	±0
Blank ballots	508	0.80	+0.80		
Total	63,755			27	±0
Valid votes	63,755	98.62	−1.38		
Invalid votes	890	1.38	+1.38		
Votes cast / turnout	64,645	60.58	+3.39		
Abstentions	42,062	39.42	−3.39		
Registered voters	106,707				
Sources
Footnotes: ^{1} People's Alliance results are compared to People's Coalition totals in the 1983 election.; ^{2} United Left–Assembly for Andalusia results are compared to Communist Party of Spain totals in the 1983 election.

=== Antequera ===
Population: 40,732

← Summary of the 10 June 1987 City Council of Antequera election results →
Parties and alliances	Popular vote			Seats	
Parties and alliances	Votes	%	±pp	Total	+/−
Spanish Socialist Workers' Party of Andalusia (PSOE–A)	7,666	42.01	−17.04	10	−3
Independent Solution (SI)	3,490	19.13	New	5	+5
People's Alliance (AP)^{1}	2,914	15.97	−9.67	4	−1
United Left–Assembly for Andalusia (IU–CA)^{2}	1,336	7.32	−1.76	1	−1
Andalusian Workers' Group (ATA)	1,234	6.76	+1.46	1	±0
Andalusian Progressive Unitarian Group (AUPA)	882	4.83	New	0	±0
Democratic and Social Centre (CDS)	577	3.16	New	0	±0
Humanist Platform (PH)	0	0.00	New	0	±0
Blank ballots	148	0.81	+0.81		
Total	18,247			21	±0
Valid votes	18,247	99.01	−0.99		
Invalid votes	183	0.99	+0.99		
Votes cast / turnout	18,430	61.86	+3.81		
Abstentions	11,363	38.14	−3.81		
Registered voters	29,793				
Sources
Footnotes: ^{1} People's Alliance results are compared to People's Coalition totals in the 1983 election.; ^{2} United Left–Assembly for Andalusia results are compared to Communist Party of Spain totals in the 1983 election.

=== Benalmádena ===
Population: 19,727

← Summary of the 10 June 1987 City Council of Benalmádena election results →
Parties and alliances	Popular vote			Seats	
Parties and alliances	Votes	%	±pp	Total	+/−
Spanish Socialist Workers' Party of Andalusia (PSOE–A)	1,925	28.40	+0.41	6	+1
People's Alliance (AP)^{1}	1,784	26.32	+22.75	5	+5
Independent Group of Benalmádena, Arroyo and Costa (GIBAC)	1,474	21.74	−23.49	4	−5
Democratic and Social Centre (CDS)	539	7.95	New	1	+1
United Left–Assembly for Andalusia (IU–CA)^{2}	477	7.04	+3.52	1	+1
Benalmádena–Arroyo Independent Socialists (SIBA)	300	4.43	New	0	±0
Andalusian Party (PA)	155	2.29	+0.83	0	±0
People's Democratic Party (PDP)	62	0.91	New	0	±0
Independent Group (AI)	n/a	n/a	−9.91	0	−2
Arroyo de la Miel and Benalmádena Popular Candidacy (CPAB)	n/a	n/a	−5.19	0	−1
Blank ballots	63	0.93	+0.93		
Total	6,779			17	±0
Valid votes	6,779	98.96	−1.04		
Invalid votes	71	1.04	+1.04		
Votes cast / turnout	6,850	64.37	−2.60		
Abstentions	3,792	35.63	+2.60		
Registered voters	10,642				
Sources
Footnotes: ^{1} People's Alliance results are compared to People's Coalition totals in the 1983 election.; ^{2} United Left–Assembly for Andalusia results are compared to Communist Party of Spain totals in the 1983 election.

=== Cádiz ===
Population: 155,299

← Summary of the 10 June 1987 City Council of Cádiz election results →
Parties and alliances	Popular vote			Seats	
Parties and alliances	Votes	%	±pp	Total	+/−
Spanish Socialist Workers' Party of Andalusia (PSOE–A)	30,350	50.72	−8.74	16	−2
People's Alliance (AP)^{1}	14,866	24.84	−7.04	7	−2
Democratic and Social Centre (CDS)	5,238	8.75	+7.31	2	+2
United Left–Assembly for Andalusia (IU–CA)^{2}	4,590	7.67	+4.08	2	+2
Andalusian Party (PA)	2,504	4.18	+2.65	0	±0
People's Democratic Party (PDP)	787	1.32	New	0	±0
Workers' Party of Spain–Communist Unity (PTE–UC)	365	0.61	New	0	±0
Humanist Platform (PH)	254	0.42	New	0	±0
Communist Unification of Spain (UCE)	159	0.27	New	0	±0
Blank ballots	726	1.21	+1.21		
Total	59,839			27	±0
Valid votes	59,839	97.65	−2.35		
Invalid votes	1,437	2.35	+2.35		
Votes cast / turnout	61,276	55.39	+4.73		
Abstentions	49,355	44.61	−4.73		
Registered voters	110,631				
Sources
Footnotes: ^{1} People's Alliance results are compared to People's Coalition totals in the 1983 election.; ^{2} United Left–Assembly for Andalusia results are compared to Communist Party of Spain totals in the 1983 election.

=== Chiclana de la Frontera ===
Population: 41,677

← Summary of the 10 June 1987 City Council of Chiclana de la Frontera election results →
Parties and alliances	Popular vote			Seats	
Parties and alliances	Votes	%	±pp	Total	+/−
Spanish Socialist Workers' Party of Andalusia (PSOE–A)	9,341	64.17	−2.44	15	±0
Democratic and Social Centre (CDS)	1,987	13.65	New	3	+3
People's Alliance (AP)^{1}	1,219	8.37	−0.79	1	−1
United Left–Assembly for Andalusia (IU–CA)^{2}	1,082	7.43	+1.91	1	±0
Andalusian Party (PA)	837	5.75	+4.09	1	+1
Independents (INDEP)	n/a	n/a	−11.10	0	−2
Independents (INDEP)	n/a	n/a	−5.94	0	−1
Blank ballots	90	0.62	+0.62		
Total	14,556			21	±0
Valid votes	14,556	99.18	−0.82		
Invalid votes	121	0.82	+0.82		
Votes cast / turnout	14,677	55.46	−1.46		
Abstentions	11,786	44.54	+1.46		
Registered voters	26,463				
Sources
Footnotes: ^{1} People's Alliance results are compared to People's Coalition totals in the 1983 election.; ^{2} United Left–Assembly for Andalusia results are compared to Communist Party of Spain totals in the 1983 election.

=== Córdoba ===
Population: 295,290

← Summary of the 10 June 1987 City Council of Córdoba election results →
Parties and alliances	Popular vote			Seats	
Parties and alliances	Votes	%	±pp	Total	+/−
United Left–Assembly for Andalusia (IU–CA)^{1}	49,134	35.82	−22.15	10	−7
Spanish Socialist Workers' Party of Andalusia (PSOE–A)	41,194	30.03	+14.41	9	+5
People's Alliance (AP)^{2}	31,813	23.19	−0.28	7	+1
Democratic and Social Centre (CDS)	8,111	5.91	+4.47	1	+1
Andalusian Party (PA)	2,963	2.16	+1.01	0	±0
Workers' Party of Spain–Communist Unity (PTE–UC)	1,979	1.44	New	0	±0
People's Democratic Party–Liberal Party: Centrists of Córdoba (PDP–PL)	557	0.41	New	0	±0
Humanist Platform (PH)	212	0.15	New	0	±0
Andalusian Liberation (LA)	167	0.12	New	0	±0
Blank ballots	1,025	0.75	+0.75		
Total	137,155			27	±0
Valid votes	137,155	99.05	−0.95		
Invalid votes	1,316	0.95	+0.95		
Votes cast / turnout	138,471	65.12	−4.17		
Abstentions	74,175	34.88	+4.17		
Registered voters	212,646				
Sources
Footnotes: ^{1} United Left–Assembly for Andalusia results are compared to Communist Party of Spain totals in the 1983 election.; ^{2} People's Alliance results are compared to People's Coalition totals in the 1983 election.

=== Dos Hermanas ===
Population: 66,819

← Summary of the 10 June 1987 City Council of Dos Hermanas election results →
Parties and alliances	Popular vote			Seats	
Parties and alliances	Votes	%	±pp	Total	+/−
Spanish Socialist Workers' Party of Andalusia (PSOE–A)	17,437	64.54	+12.25	17	+4
United Left–Assembly for Andalusia (IU–CA)^{1}	4,398	16.28	−13.99	4	−4
People's Alliance (AP)^{2}	3,003	11.12	−3.87	3	−1
Workers' Party of Spain–Communist Unity (PTE–UC)	1,591	5.89	New	1	+1
People's Democratic Party (PDP)	166	0.61	New	0	±0
Humanist Platform (PH)	99	0.37	New	0	±0
Revolutionary Communist League (LCR)	68	0.25	New	0	±0
Blank ballots	254	0.94	+0.94		
Total	27,016			25	±0
Valid votes	27,016	99.12	−0.88		
Invalid votes	239	0.88	+0.88		
Votes cast / turnout	27,255	62.53	−1.23		
Abstentions	16,330	37.47	+1.23		
Registered voters	43,585				
Sources
Footnotes: ^{1} United Left–Assembly for Andalusia results are compared to Communist Party of Spain totals in the 1983 election.; ^{2} People's Alliance results are compared to People's Coalition totals in the 1983 election.

=== Écija ===
Population: 35,161

← Summary of the 10 June 1987 City Council of Écija election results →
Parties and alliances	Popular vote			Seats	
Parties and alliances	Votes	%	±pp	Total	+/−
Spanish Socialist Workers' Party of Andalusia (PSOE–A)	6,995	42.64	+9.68	10	+3
Andalusian Party (PA)	5,458	33.27	−3.33	7	−1
People's Alliance (AP)^{1}	2,062	12.57	−13.11	3	−3
United Left–Assembly for Andalusia (IU–CA)^{2}	965	5.88	+1.13	1	+1
Democratic and Social Centre (CDS)	528	3.22	New	0	±0
Workers' Party of Spain–Communist Unity (PTE–UC)	180	1.10	New	0	±0
Republican Popular Unity (UPR)	121	0.74	New	0	±0
Humanist Platform (PH)	29	0.18	New	0	±0
Blank ballots	67	0.41	+0.41		
Total	16,405			21	±0
Valid votes	16,405	99.17	−0.83		
Invalid votes	138	0.83	+0.83		
Votes cast / turnout	16,543	66.20	−2.15		
Abstentions	8,446	33.80	+2.15		
Registered voters	24,989				
Sources
Footnotes: ^{1} People's Alliance results are compared to People's Coalition totals in the 1983 election.; ^{2} United Left–Assembly for Andalusia results are compared to Communist Party of Spain totals in the 1983 election.

=== El Ejido ===
Population: 36,335

← Summary of the 10 June 1987 City Council of El Ejido election results →
Parties and alliances	Popular vote			Seats	
Parties and alliances	Votes	%	±pp	Total	+/−
Spanish Socialist Workers' Party of Andalusia (PSOE–A)	5,005	37.41	−17.30	9	−3
People's Alliance (AP)^{1}	2,539	18.98	+0.59	4	±0
Democratic and Social Centre (CDS)	2,453	18.33	New	4	+4
Agriculture First (ALPO)	1,289	9.63	New	2	+2
Independent Candidacy of Santa María del Águila–Las Norias (CIAN)	973	7.27	New	1	+1
United Left–Assembly for Andalusia (IU–CA)^{2}	866	6.47	+0.99	1	±0
Andalusian Party (PA)	198	1.48	New	0	±0
Independents (INDEP)	n/a	n/a	−17.56	0	−4
Blank ballots	56	0.42	+0.42		
Total	13,379			21	±0
Valid votes	13,379	98.91	−1.09		
Invalid votes	148	1.09	+1.09		
Votes cast / turnout	13,527	57.06	+11.13		
Abstentions	10,181	42.94	−11.13		
Registered voters	23,708				
Sources
Footnotes: ^{1} People's Alliance results are compared to People's Coalition totals in the 1983 election.; ^{2} United Left–Assembly for Andalusia results are compared to Communist Party of Spain totals in the 1983 election.

=== El Puerto de Santa María ===
Population: 60,638

← Summary of the 10 June 1987 City Council of El Puerto de Santa María election results →
Parties and alliances	Popular vote			Seats	
Parties and alliances	Votes	%	±pp	Total	+/−
Spanish Socialist Workers' Party of Andalusia (PSOE–A)	7,674	37.50	+9.30	10	+2
United Left–Assembly for Andalusia (IU–CA)^{1}	5,035	24.60	−8.65	7	−2
People's Alliance (AP)^{2}	4,863	23.76	−3.03	6	−1
Democratic and Social Centre (CDS)	1,641	8.02	+5.91	2	+2
Andalusian Party (PA)	984	4.81	+1.52	0	±0
People's Democratic Party (PDP)	56	0.27	New	0	±0
Independents (INDEP)	n/a	n/a	−6.36	0	−1
Blank ballots	212	1.04	+1.04		
Total	20,465			25	±0
Valid votes	20,465	98.49	−1.51		
Invalid votes	314	1.51	+1.51		
Votes cast / turnout	20,779	50.38	+0.22		
Abstentions	20,465	49.62	−0.22		
Registered voters	41,244				
Sources
Footnotes: ^{1} United Left–Assembly for Andalusia results are compared to Communist Party of Spain totals in the 1983 election.; ^{2} People's Alliance results are compared to People's Coalition totals in the 1983 election.

=== Fuengirola ===
Population: 34,008

← Summary of the 10 June 1987 City Council of Fuengirola election results →
Parties and alliances	Popular vote			Seats	
Parties and alliances	Votes	%	±pp	Total	+/−
Spanish Socialist Workers' Party of Andalusia (PSOE–A)	6,303	44.97	−19.24	10	−5
People's Alliance (AP)^{1}	2,913	20.78	−3.29	5	±0
Independent Solution (SI)	2,388	17.04	New	4	+4
Democratic and Social Centre (CDS)	1,010	7.21	+3.69	1	+1
United Left–Assembly for Andalusia (IU–CA)^{2}	1,008	7.19	+2.16	1	±0
Andalusian Party (PA)	257	1.83	−1.33	0	±0
Blank ballots	137	0.98	+0.98		
Total	14,016			21	±0
Valid votes	14,016	99.14	−0.86		
Invalid votes	121	0.86	+0.86		
Votes cast / turnout	14,137	64.26	+0.88		
Abstentions	7,862	35.74	−0.88		
Registered voters	21,999				
Sources
Footnotes: ^{1} People's Alliance results are compared to People's Coalition totals in the 1983 election.; ^{2} United Left–Assembly for Andalusia results are compared to Communist Party of Spain totals in the 1983 election.

=== Granada ===
Population: 256,073

← Summary of the 10 June 1987 City Council of Granada election results →
Parties and alliances	Popular vote			Seats	
Parties and alliances	Votes	%	±pp	Total	+/−
Spanish Socialist Workers' Party of Andalusia (PSOE–A)	47,083	40.11	−20.30	12	−6
People's Alliance (AP)^{1}	42,078	35.84	+5.63	11	+2
Democratic and Social Centre (CDS)	11,019	9.39	+7.64	2	+2
United Left–Assembly for Andalusia (IU–CA)^{2}	9,872	8.41	+3.97	2	+2
Andalusian Party (PA)	2,425	2.07	+1.44	0	±0
Workers' Party of Spain–Communist Unity (PTE–UC)	2,416	2.06	New	0	±0
People's Democratic Party (PDP)	938	0.80	New	0	±0
Spanish Phalanx of the CNSO (FE–JONS)	403	0.34	New	0	±0
Humanist Platform (PH)	231	0.20	New	0	±0
Blank ballots	930	0.79	+0.79		
Total	117,395			27	±0
Valid votes	117,395	98.44	−1.56		
Invalid votes	1,857	1.56	+1.56		
Votes cast / turnout	119,252	64.16	−2.14		
Abstentions	66,620	35.84	+2.14		
Registered voters	185,872				
Sources
Footnotes: ^{1} People's Alliance results are compared to People's Coalition totals in the 1983 election.; ^{2} United Left–Assembly for Andalusia results are compared to Communist Party of Spain totals in the 1983 election.

=== Huelva ===
Population: 135,210

← Summary of the 10 June 1987 City Council of Huelva election results →
Parties and alliances	Popular vote			Seats	
Parties and alliances	Votes	%	±pp	Total	+/−
Spanish Socialist Workers' Party of Andalusia (PSOE–A)	22,835	45.82	−18.72	14	−6
People's Alliance (AP)^{1}	10,447	20.96	−1.54	6	−1
Democratic and Social Centre (CDS)	7,185	14.42	+12.78	4	+4
United Left–Assembly for Andalusia (IU–CA)^{2}	4,623	9.28	+5.39	3	+3
Andalusian Party (PA)	1,827	3.67	+2.21	0	±0
Townspeople Party (PGP)	723	1.45	New	0	±0
Workers' Party of Spain–Communist Unity (PTE–UC)	711	1.43	New	0	±0
People's Democratic Party (PDP)	613	1.23	New	0	±0
Communist Unification of Spain (UCE)	155	0.31	New	0	±0
Humanist Platform (PH)	139	0.28	New	0	±0
Blank ballots	576	1.16	+1.16		
Total	49,834			27	±0
Valid votes	49,834	98.47	−1.53		
Invalid votes	776	1.53	+1.53		
Votes cast / turnout	50,610	53.07	−0.98		
Abstentions	44,753	46.93	+0.98		
Registered voters	95,363				
Sources
Footnotes: ^{1} People's Alliance results are compared to People's Coalition totals in the 1983 election.; ^{2} United Left–Assembly for Andalusia results are compared to Communist Party of Spain totals in the 1983 election.

=== Jaén ===
Population: 102,933

← Summary of the 10 June 1987 City Council of Jaén election results →
Parties and alliances	Popular vote			Seats	
Parties and alliances	Votes	%	±pp	Total	+/−
Spanish Socialist Workers' Party of Andalusia (PSOE–A)	18,493	38.78	−13.49	11	−3
People's Alliance (AP)^{1}	17,863	37.45	−0.59	11	+1
Democratic and Social Centre (CDS)	4,915	10.31	+8.09	3	+3
United Left–Assembly for Andalusia (IU–CA)^{2}	4,066	8.53	+3.18	2	+1
Andalusian Party (PA)	1,065	2.23	+0.12	0	±0
Workers' Party of Spain–Communist Unity (PTE–UC)	418	0.88	New	0	±0
Andalusian Nationalist Party (PNA)	237	0.50	New	0	±0
People's Democratic Party (PDP)	219	0.46	New	0	±0
Humanist Platform (PH)	70	0.15	New	0	±0
Blank ballots	347	0.73	+0.73		
Total	47,693			27	+2
Valid votes	47,693	98.85	−1.15		
Invalid votes	557	1.15	+1.15		
Votes cast / turnout	48,250	67.00	−0.61		
Abstentions	23,760	33.00	+0.61		
Registered voters	72,010				
Sources
Footnotes: ^{1} People's Alliance results are compared to People's Coalition totals in the 1983 election.; ^{2} United Left–Assembly for Andalusia results are compared to Communist Party of Spain totals in the 1983 election.

=== Jerez de la Frontera ===
Population: 179,191

← Summary of the 10 June 1987 City Council of Jerez de la Frontera election results →
Parties and alliances	Popular vote			Seats	
Parties and alliances	Votes	%	±pp	Total	+/−
Andalusian Party (PA)	43,870	56.86	+2.28	17	+1
Spanish Socialist Workers' Party of Andalusia (PSOE–A)	18,261	23.67	−3.20	7	±0
People's Alliance (AP)^{1}	8,428	10.92	−3.35	3	−1
United Left–Assembly for Andalusia (IU–CA)^{2}	3,479	4.51	+0.88	0	±0
Democratic and Social Centre (CDS)	1,648	2.14	New	0	±0
Workers' Party of Spain–Communist Unity (PTE–UC)	529	0.69	New	0	±0
Spanish Phalanx of the CNSO (FE–JONS)	183	0.24	New	0	±0
Humanist Platform (PH)	140	0.18	New	0	±0
People's Democratic Party (PDP)	115	0.15	New	0	±0
Blank ballots	497	0.64	+0.64		
Total	77,150			27	±0
Valid votes	77,150	98.04	−1.96		
Invalid votes	1,544	1.96	+1.96		
Votes cast / turnout	78,694	64.00	−0.62		
Abstentions	44,261	36.00	+0.62		
Registered voters	122,955				
Sources
Footnotes: ^{1} People's Alliance results are compared to People's Coalition totals in the 1983 election.; ^{2} United Left–Assembly for Andalusia results are compared to Communist Party of Spain totals in the 1983 election.

=== La Línea de la Concepción ===
Population: 58,779

← Summary of the 10 June 1987 City Council of La Línea de la Concepción election results →
Parties and alliances	Popular vote			Seats	
Parties and alliances	Votes	%	±pp	Total	+/−
Spanish Socialist Workers' Party of Andalusia (PSOE–A)	13,501	54.71	−25.00	16	−6
People's Alliance (AP)^{1}	4,784	19.39	+7.10	5	+2
Andalusian Party (PA)	2,936	11.90	+9.22	3	+3
Democratic and Social Centre (CDS)	1,257	5.09	New	1	+1
United Left–Assembly for Andalusia (IU–CA)^{2}	1,084	4.39	+1.66	0	±0
Left Alternative Candidacy (CAI)	808	3.27	New	0	±0
Humanist Platform (PH)	52	0.21	New	0	±0
Blank ballots	255	1.03	+1.03		
Total	24,677			25	±0
Valid votes	24,677	98.98	−1.02		
Invalid votes	254	1.02	+1.02		
Votes cast / turnout	24,931	61.59	+2.76		
Abstentions	15,547	38.41	−2.76		
Registered voters	40,478				
Sources
Footnotes: ^{1} People's Alliance results are compared to People's Coalition totals in the 1983 election.; ^{2} United Left–Assembly for Andalusia results are compared to Communist Party of Spain totals in the 1983 election.

=== Linares ===
Population: 57,401

← Summary of the 10 June 1987 City Council of Linares election results →
Parties and alliances	Popular vote			Seats	
Parties and alliances	Votes	%	±pp	Total	+/−
Spanish Socialist Workers' Party of Andalusia (PSOE–A)	10,273	37.11	−24.65	10	−6
United Left–Assembly for Andalusia (IU–CA)^{1}	6,854	24.76	+10.75	6	+3
People's Alliance (AP)^{2}	5,321	19.22	−3.15	5	−1
Democratic and Social Centre (CDS)	4,146	14.98	New	4	+4
Andalusian Party (PA)	826	2.98	+1.12	0	±0
Humanist Platform (PH)	59	0.21	New	0	±0
Blank ballots	205	0.74	+0.74		
Total	27,684			25	±0
Valid votes	27,684	99.20	−0.80		
Invalid votes	223	0.80	+0.80		
Votes cast / turnout	27,907	68.38	−2.64		
Abstentions	12,907	31.62	+2.64		
Registered voters	40,814				
Sources
Footnotes: ^{1} United Left–Assembly for Andalusia results are compared to Communist Party of Spain totals in the 1983 election.; ^{2} People's Alliance results are compared to People's Coalition totals in the 1983 election.

=== Málaga ===
Population: 563,332

← Summary of the 10 June 1987 City Council of Málaga election results →
Parties and alliances	Popular vote			Seats	
Parties and alliances	Votes	%	±pp	Total	+/−
Spanish Socialist Workers' Party of Andalusia (PSOE–A)	96,939	49.04	−14.26	17	−4
People's Alliance (AP)^{1}	44,340	22.43	−3.18	7	−1
United Left–Assembly for Andalusia (IU–CA)^{2}	23,315	11.80	+4.62	4	+2
Democratic and Social Centre (CDS)	18,489	9.35	+8.07	3	+3
Andalusian Party (PA)	5,504	2.78	+0.82	0	±0
People's Democratic Party (PDP)	3,646	1.84	New	0	±0
Workers' Party of Spain–Communist Unity (PTE–UC)	2,357	1.19	New	0	±0
Humanist Platform (PH)	617	0.31	New	0	±0
Spanish Phalanx of the CNSO (FE–JONS)	575	0.29	New	0	±0
Andalusian Liberation (LA)	366	0.19	New	0	±0
Blank ballots	1,519	0.77	+0.77		
Total	197,667			31	±0
Valid votes	197,667	98.49	−1.51		
Invalid votes	3,033	1.51	+1.51		
Votes cast / turnout	200,700	56.23	+0.05		
Abstentions	156,239	43.77	−0.05		
Registered voters	356,939				
Sources
Footnotes: ^{1} People's Alliance results are compared to People's Coalition totals in the 1983 election.; ^{2} United Left–Assembly for Andalusia results are compared to Communist Party of Spain totals in the 1983 election.

=== Marbella ===
Population: 74,807

← Summary of the 10 June 1987 City Council of Marbella election results →
Parties and alliances	Popular vote			Seats	
Parties and alliances	Votes	%	±pp	Total	+/−
Spanish Socialist Workers' Party of Andalusia (PSOE–A)	6,557	27.37	−24.68	8	−8
People's Alliance (AP)^{1}	6,089	25.42	+7.84	7	+2
United Left–Assembly for Andalusia (IU–CA)^{2}	4,329	18.07	+13.68	5	+5
Pro-Independence Association (API)	3,904	16.30	New	5	+5
Independent Group for Marbella and San Pedro de Alcántara (GIM)	1,196	4.99	−1.89	0	−2
Democratic and Social Centre (CDS)	1,101	4.60	New	0	±0
Workers' Party of Spain–Communist Unity (PTE–UC)	375	1.57	New	0	±0
Humanist Platform (PH)	75	0.31	New	0	±0
People's Democratic Party (PDP)	59	0.25	New	0	±0
Spanish Phalanx of the CNSO (FE–JONS)	21	0.09	New	0	±0
Socialist Action Party (PASOC)	n/a	n/a	−9.54	0	−2
Blank ballots	250	1.04	+1.04		
Total	23,956			25	±0
Valid votes	23,956	98.81	−1.19		
Invalid votes	288	1.19	+1.19		
Votes cast / turnout	24,244	57.83	−2.39		
Abstentions	17,677	42.17	+2.39		
Registered voters	41,921				
Sources
Footnotes: ^{1} People's Alliance results are compared to People's Coalition totals in the 1983 election.; ^{2} United Left–Assembly for Andalusia results are compared to Communist Party of Andalusia totals in the 1983 election.

=== Morón de la Frontera ===
Population: 28,439

← Summary of the 10 June 1987 City Council of Morón de la Frontera election results →
Parties and alliances	Popular vote			Seats	
Parties and alliances	Votes	%	±pp	Total	+/−
People's Alliance (AP)^{1}	4,737	34.41	+27.95	8	+7
United Left–Assembly for Andalusia (IU–CA)^{2}	4,257	30.92	+21.05	7	+5
Spanish Socialist Workers' Party of Andalusia (PSOE–A)	4,001	29.06	−29.61	6	−7
Democratic and Social Centre (CDS)	456	3.31	New	0	±0
Andalusian Party (PA)	254	1.84	New	0	±0
Independents (INDEP)	n/a	n/a	−17.74	0	−4
Independents (INDEP)	n/a	n/a	−7.26	0	−1
Blank ballots	62	0.45	+0.45		
Total	13,767			21	±0
Valid votes	13,767	98.94	−1.06		
Invalid votes	148	1.06	+1.06		
Votes cast / turnout	13,915	70.01	+6.37		
Abstentions	5,961	29.99	−6.37		
Registered voters	19,876				
Sources
Footnotes: ^{2} People's Alliance results are compared to People's Coalition totals in the 1983 election.; ^{1} United Left–Assembly for Andalusia results are compared to Communist Party of Spain totals in the 1983 election.

=== Motril ===
Population: 44,482

← Summary of the 10 June 1987 City Council of Motril election results →
Parties and alliances	Popular vote			Seats	
Parties and alliances	Votes	%	±pp	Total	+/−
Spanish Socialist Workers' Party of Andalusia (PSOE–A)	8,316	46.98	−23.90	11	−5
People's Alliance (AP)^{1}	3,868	21.85	+6.66	5	+2
United Left–Assembly for Andalusia (IU–CA)^{2}	2,319	13.10	+7.63	3	+2
Democratic and Social Centre (CDS)	1,344	7.59	New	1	+1
Andalusian Party (PA)	1,066	6.02	New	1	+1
Workers' Party of Spain–Communist Unity (PTE–UC)	648	3.66	New	0	±0
Independents (INDEP)	n/a	n/a	−8.47	0	−1
Blank ballots	140	0.79	+0.79		
Total	17,701			21	±0
Valid votes	17,701	98.87	−1.13		
Invalid votes	203	1.13	+1.13		
Votes cast / turnout	17,904	59.15	−8.73		
Abstentions	12,366	40.85	+8.73		
Registered voters	30,270				
Sources
Footnotes: ^{1} People's Alliance results are compared to People's Coalition totals in the 1983 election.; ^{2} United Left–Assembly for Andalusia results are compared to Communist Party of Spain totals in the 1983 election.

=== Ronda ===
Population: 31,971

← Summary of the 10 June 1987 City Council of Ronda election results →
Parties and alliances	Popular vote			Seats	
Parties and alliances	Votes	%	±pp	Total	+/−
Spanish Socialist Workers' Party of Andalusia (PSOE–A)	4,390	32.44	−18.29	8	−3
People's Alliance (AP)^{1}	3,055	22.58	−0.55	5	±0
Andalusian Party (PA)	3,021	22.33	+2.50	5	+1
United Left–Assembly for Andalusia (IU–CA)^{2}	1,459	10.78	+4.47	2	+1
People's Democratic Party (PDP)	754	5.57	New	1	+1
Democratic and Social Centre (CDS)	472	3.49	New	0	±0
Workers' Party of Spain–Communist Unity (PTE–UC)	211	1.56	New	0	±0
Humanist Platform (PH)	18	0.13	New	0	±0
Blank ballots	151	1.12	+1.12		
Total	13,531			21	±0
Valid votes	13,531	97.88	−2.12		
Invalid votes	293	2.12	+2.12		
Votes cast / turnout	13,824	60.37	+4.35		
Abstentions	9,074	39.63	−4.35		
Registered voters	22,898				
Sources
Footnotes: ^{1} People's Alliance results are compared to People's Coalition totals in the 1983 election.; ^{2} United Left–Assembly for Andalusia results are compared to Communist Party of Spain totals in the 1983 election.

=== San Fernando ===
Population: 80,057

← Summary of the 10 June 1987 City Council of San Fernando election results →
Parties and alliances	Popular vote			Seats	
Parties and alliances	Votes	%	±pp	Total	+/−
Spanish Socialist Workers' Party of Andalusia (PSOE–A)	10,199	35.13	−0.25	10	+1
Andalusian Party (PA)	9,717	33.47	−0.93	9	±0
People's Alliance (AP)^{1}	5,193	17.89	−4.89	5	−1
Democratic and Social Centre (CDS)	1,748	6.02	New	1	+1
United Left–Assembly for Andalusia (IU–CA)^{2}	1,356	4.67	−0.41	0	−1
People's Democratic Party–Liberal Party: Centrists of Cádiz (PDP–PL)	306	1.05	New	0	±0
Workers' Party of Spain–Communist Unity (PTE–UC)	146	0.50	New	0	±0
Humanist Platform (PH)	106	0.37	New	0	±0
Blank ballots	259	0.89	+0.89		
Total	29,030			25	±0
Valid votes	29,030	99.42	−1.58		
Invalid votes	467	1.58	+1.58		
Votes cast / turnout	29,497	54.79	+2.76		
Abstentions	24,336	45.21	−2.76		
Registered voters	53,833				
Sources
Footnotes: ^{1} People's Alliance results are compared to People's Coalition totals in the 1983 election.; ^{2} United Left–Assembly for Andalusia results are compared to Communist Party of Spain totals in the 1983 election.

=== Sanlúcar de Barrameda ===
Population: 53,017

← Summary of the 10 June 1987 City Council of Sanlúcar de Barrameda election results →
Parties and alliances	Popular vote			Seats	
Parties and alliances	Votes	%	±pp	Total	+/−
United Left–Assembly for Andalusia (IU–CA)^{1}	8,357	40.45	−14.60	11	−1
Spanish Socialist Workers' Party of Andalusia (PSOE–A)	7,227	34.98	+9.50	9	+3
Democratic and Social Centre (CDS)	2,224	10.76	+8.06	3	+3
People's Alliance (AP)^{2}	1,520	7.36	−8.21	2	−1
Workers' Party of Spain–Communist Unity (PTE–UC)	656	3.17	New	0	±0
Andalusian Party (PA)	533	2.58	New	0	±0
Humanist Platform (PH)	43	0.21	New	0	±0
Blank ballots	102	0.49	+0.49		
Total	20,662			25	+4
Valid votes	20,662	99.18	−0.82		
Invalid votes	171	0.82	+0.82		
Votes cast / turnout	20,833	59.08	+3.28		
Abstentions	14,427	40.92	−3.28		
Registered voters	35,260				
Sources
Footnotes: ^{1} United Left–Assembly for Andalusia results are compared to Communist Party of Spain totals in the 1983 election.; ^{2} People's Alliance results are compared to People's Coalition totals in the 1983 election.

=== Seville ===
Population: 651,084

=== Utrera ===
Population: 40,736

← Summary of the 10 June 1987 City Council of Utrera election results →
Parties and alliances	Popular vote			Seats	
Parties and alliances	Votes	%	±pp	Total	+/−
Spanish Socialist Workers' Party of Andalusia (PSOE–A)	13,139	69.14	+3.42	16	−3
Andalusian Party (PA)	1,863	9.80	+7.94	2	+2
Democratic and Social Centre (CDS)	1,504	7.91	New	1	+1
United Left–Assembly for Andalusia (IU–CA)^{1}	1,213	6.38	+1.94	1	+1
People's Alliance (AP)^{2}	1,081	5.69	−5.19	1	−1
Humanist Platform (PH)	49	0.26	New	0	±0
Blank ballots	155	0.82	+0.82		
Total	19,004			21	±0
Valid votes	19,004	99.05	−0.95		
Invalid votes	183	0.95	+0.95		
Votes cast / turnout	19,187	68.70	+12.55		
Abstentions	8,740	31.30	−12.55		
Registered voters	27,927				
Sources
Footnotes: ^{1} United Left–Assembly for Andalusia results are compared to Communist Party of Spain totals in the 1983 election.; ^{2} People's Alliance results are compared to People's Coalition totals in the 1983 election.

=== Vélez-Málaga ===
Population: 50,438

← Summary of the 10 June 1987 City Council of Vélez-Málaga election results →
Parties and alliances	Popular vote			Seats	
Parties and alliances	Votes	%	±pp	Total	+/−
Spanish Socialist Workers' Party of Andalusia (PSOE–A)	7,462	34.68	−25.53	9	−5
People's Alliance (AP)^{1}	4,602	21.39	+1.37	6	+2
Pro-Torre del Mar Municipality Independent Group (GIPMTM)	3,170	14.73	New	4	+4
United Left–Assembly for Andalusia (IU–CA)^{2}	2,370	11.01	+4.63	3	+2
Andalusian Party (PA)	2,215	10.29	+2.26	2	+1
Democratic and Social Centre (CDS)	1,333	6.19	New	1	+1
People's Democratic Party (PDP)	126	0.59	New	0	±0
Spanish Phalanx of the CNSO (FE–JONS)	115	0.53	New	0	±0
Humanist Platform (PH)	35	0.16	New	0	±0
Independent Group for the Progress of Malagenean People (AIPM)	n/a	n/a	−5.36	0	−1
Blank ballots	90	0.42	+0.42		
Total	21,518			25	+4
Valid votes	21,518	99.30	−0.70		
Invalid votes	151	0.70	+0.70		
Votes cast / turnout	21,669	66.83	+4.85		
Abstentions	10,757	33.17	−4.85		
Registered voters	32,426				
Sources
Footnotes: ^{1} People's Alliance results are compared to People's Coalition totals in the 1983 election.; ^{2} United Left–Assembly for Andalusia results are compared to Communist Party of Spain totals in the 1983 election.
