= Luis Salvador (politician) =

Spanish politician (born 1963)

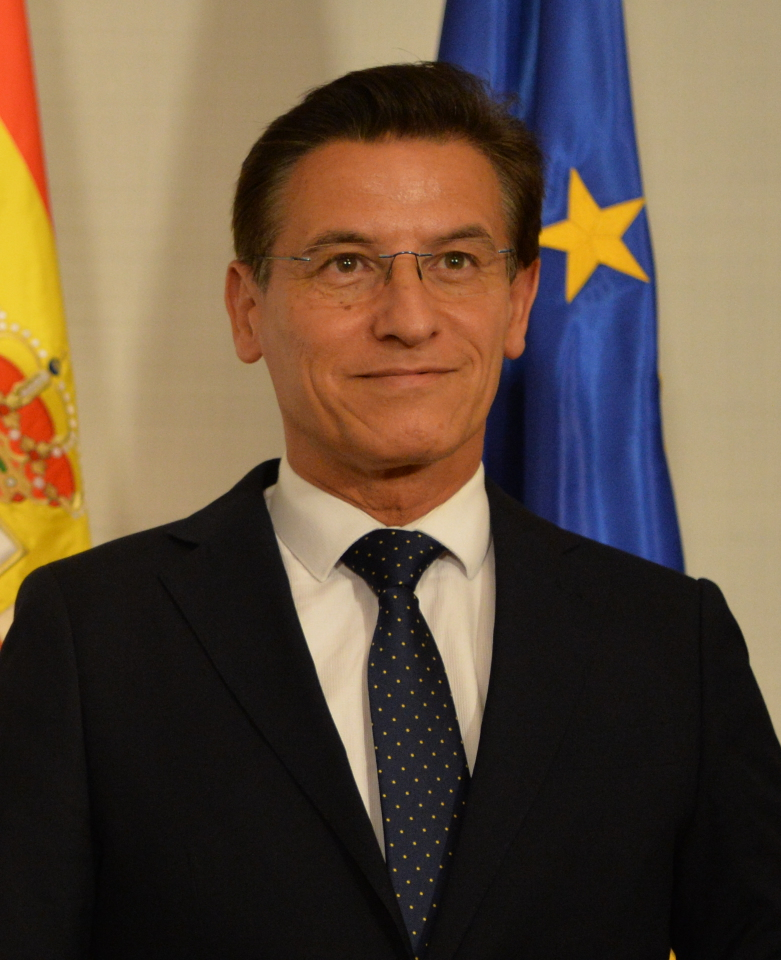

Luis Miguel Salvador García (born 17 April 1963) is a Spanish politician of the Citizens party. He was mayor of Granada from 2019 to 2021, and was in the Congress of Deputies from 2016 to 2019. Before switching parties in 2013, he was in the Spanish Socialist Workers' Party and was in the Senate from 2004 to 2011.

== Biography ==
Born in Córdoba, Salvador graduated in Political Science and Administration at the University of Granada. He later qualified as an international electoral observer at the Diplomatic School of Spain, and was Head of the Cabinet in the Provincial Deputation of Granada.

In 2004, Salvador was elected to the Senate for Granada, and won re-election in 2008. In October 2013, he quit the Spanish Socialist Workers' Party (PSOE) due to his disapproval of regional chief Susana Díaz, and joined Citizens. He contested the 2014 European elections, being unelected as last place on Citizens' list in Andalusia.

In the 2015 local elections, Salvador campaigned to be mayor of Granada. He ordered the Citizens members in the city hall to abstain during the investiture of People's Party (PP) incumbent José Torres Hurtado, having turned down the offer to join him in government. At the end of that year, he returned to national politics, being elected to the Congress of Deputies.

In May 2019, during his campaign to be mayor of Granada, Salvador attracted attention for a post on his website which used analysis from a follower of the pseudoscience of morphopsychology to claim that his cranial features corresponded with positive attributes. Having won only four of 27 seats in the city hall, he was nonetheless made mayor in June after support from the PP (7) and Vox (3). He became one of first seven mayors from his party in medium-sized cities, including the Mayor-President of Melilla; Granada was the largest of those cities.

In December 2020, Salvador attacked the Ministry of the Interior for having transferred some African migrants from the Canary Islands to Granada. Other parties in Granada labelled his rhetoric xenophobic.

After the PP withdrew their support in him, Salvador resigned on 2 July 2021. He then supported his PSOE predecessor Francisco Cuenca. He remained in Cuenca's government, as head of Estrategía 2031, the campaign to earn Granada the title of European Capital of Culture for that year.
