= José Torres Hurtado =

Spanish politician

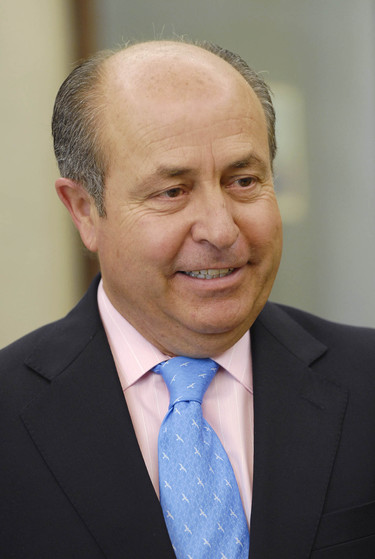

José Torres Hurtado (born 15 October 1946) is a Spanish People's Party (PP) politician. He was a member of the Congress of Deputies (1982–1986), Senate (1986–1989), Government Delegate in Andalusia (1996–2002) and mayor of Granada (2003–2016). He resigned from the last role due to implication in a corruption scandal.

== Biography ==
Born in Píñar in the province of Granada, Torres Hurtado is a farmer. After serving in both houses of the Cortes Generales and as a Government Delegate for the People's Party and its predecessor the Popular Alliance, he was named by his party as a member of the board at Radio y Televisión de Andalucía in 2002.

In June 2003, Torres Hurtado was elected mayor of Granada with an absolute majority, replacing José Moratella of the Spanish Socialist Workers' Party. In 2015, to ensure a fourth successive term, he offered the opportunity of a coalition to the Citizens party. Their leader Luis Salvador declined the offer, but ordered his party to abstain in the investiture, thereby electing Torres Hurtado.

In April 2016, Torres Hurtado and his councillor in charge of city planning resigned after being implicated in a corruption scandal; he maintained his innocence. The case became known as Caso nazarí after the Nasrid dynasty that ruled the Emirate of Granada, and the trial began in 2020. In January 2021 the case was adjourned.

Torres Hurtado ordered the removal of five memorial plaques in Granada cemeteries that were dedicated to the 4,000 victims of Francoist White Terror, including some of his predecessors as mayor. He was additionally criticised for comparing his trial to an execution by firing squad. The plaques were reinstalled after he left office.
