= Communist Party of Andalusia =

Communist Party of Andalusia Partido Comunista de Andalucía
- President: Antonio Romero Ruiz
- General Secretary: Ernesto Alba
- Founded: 1979
- Youth wing: Communist Youth of Andalusia
- Ideology: Communism; Republicanism
- National affiliation: Communist Party of Spain
- Regional affiliation: United Left/The Greens - Assembly for Andalusia
- Parliament of Andalusia: 4 / 109 (within Por Andalucía)
- Congress of Deputies: 1 / 350

Website
- pcandalucia.org

The Communist Party of Andalusia (in Spanish: Partido Comunista de Andalucía) is the federation of the Communist Party of Spain (PCE) in Andalusia.

== History ==
PCA was founded in 1979, as the Andalusian branch of PCE was converted into a regional party. The party supported autonomy for Andalusia, and called for a 'yes'-vote in the 1980 referendum on autonomy. During this phase it worked in cooperation with the Spanish Socialist Workers' Party at the municipal level. At the time, Fernando Soto was the general secretary of PCA.

PCA contested the 1982 Spanish parliamentary election, obtaining 211,456 votes (6.19% of the votes in Andalusia). The party was able to elect one parliamentarian to the Congress of Deputies, from the electoral district of Seville.

In the 1983 municipal elections, at a time when the influence of PCE was decreased across Spain, the Andalusian communists were able to win a decisive victory (57.4%) in the city of Córdoba. This was the sole provincial capital in which the PCE won the post of mayor in these elections. The electoral victory was largely due to the charismatic leadership of the mayoral candidate, Julio Anguita. The fourth congress of PCA, held in January 1984, decided to launch the coalition Convocatoria por Andalucía. Convocatoria por Andalucía would become a model for the statewide United Left (IU) which contested the 1986 municipal elections.

== Leadership and organization ==
PCA is led by a Central Committee.

The tenth congress of PCA, held in Matalascañas March 20–21, 2010 elected José Manuel Mariscal as the new general secretary of PCA, replacing José Luis Centella (who had been elected as the general secretary of PCE in November 2009). Juan de Dios Villanueva was elected as vice general secretary.

The twelfth congress of PCA, held in Albolote July 2, 2017 elected Ernesto Alba as the new general secretary of PCA, replacing José Manuel Mariscal.

Name	Period	Notes
Fernando Soto	1977-1981	
Felipe Alcaraz	1981–2002	
José Luis Centella	2002-2010	
José Manuel Mariscal	2010–2017	
Ernesto Alba	2017–present	
