= Opinion polling for the 2023 Spanish local elections (Andalusia) =

In the run up to the 2023 Spanish local elections, various organisations carried out opinion polling to gauge voting intention in local entities in Spain. Results of such polls for municipalities in Andalusia are displayed in this article. The date range for these opinion polls is from the previous local elections, held on 26 May 2019, to the day the next elections were held, on 28 May 2023.

Polls are listed in reverse chronological order, showing the most recent first and using the dates when the survey fieldwork was done, as opposed to the date of publication. Where the fieldwork dates are unknown, the date of publication is given instead. The highest percentage figure in each polling survey is displayed with its background shaded in the leading party's colour. If a tie ensues, this is applied to the figures with the highest percentages. The "Lead" columns on the right shows the percentage-point difference between the parties with the highest percentages in a given poll.

== Municipalities ==
=== Almería ===
Color key:

Poll conducted after legal ban on opinion polls

Polling firm/Commissioner	Fieldwork date	Sample size	Turnout	PP	PSOE–A	Vox	CS	Podemos	IULV	ConA	Lead
2023 municipal election	28 May 2023	—N/a	53.5	48.6; 15	23.8; 7	13.1; 4	1.7; 0	(Note: Within ConA.)		5.2; 1	24.8
GAD3/RTVE–FORTA	2–27 May 2023	?	?	? 14	? 7	? 4	? 0			? 2	?
Celeste-Tel	10 May 2023	600	?	42.4; 13	28.7; 8	9.8; 3	5.7; 1			6.8; 2	13.7
CENTRA/CEA	12–17 Jan 2023	800	?	48.5; 14/15	27.9; 8/9	7.7; 2	3.0; 0	6.9; 1/2	3.3; 0	–	20.6
2019 municipal election	26 May 2019	—N/a	54.9	43.5; 13	30.1; 9	7.8; 2	7.7; 2	5.3; 1	4.2; 0	–	13.4

=== Almonte ===
Polling firm/Commissioner	Fieldwork date	Sample size	Turnout	IG	PSOE–A	PP	Mesa	IxA	Vox	IULV	Podemos	Lead
2023 municipal election	28 May 2023	—N/a	58.8	47.3; 11	17.8; 4	14.7; 3	8.0; 2	4.2; 0	7.1; 1	–	–	29.5
Nexo/Azahara	28 Mar–11 Apr 2023	300	?	45.9; 10/12	12.6; 3	8.6; 1/2	10.0; 2	11.5; 2/3	7.7; 1	–	2.0; 0	33.3
2019 municipal election	26 May 2019	—N/a	61.6	34.9; 9	25.0; 6	14.0; 3	11.3; 2	7.7; 1	3.9; 0	2.3; 0	–	9.9

=== Bormujos ===
Polling firm/Commissioner	Fieldwork date	Sample size	Turnout	PSOE–A	PP	CS	Podemos	Vox	BxD	Lead
2023 municipal election	28 May 2023	—N/a	58.7	30.9; 8	37.0; 9	6.2; 1	5.0; 0	9.3; 2	5.9; 1	6.1
Social Data/Grupo Viva	12 May 2023	?	?	? 8/9	? 5/6	? 4	? 1	? 2	? 0/1	?
2019 municipal election	26 May 2019	—N/a	58.4	33.1; 7	22.9; 5	21.0; 5	11.8; 2	8.6; 2	–	10.2

=== Cádiz ===
Color key:

Poll conducted after legal ban on opinion polls

Polling firm/Commissioner	Fieldwork date	Sample size	Turnout	Adelante	PP	PSOE–A	CS	Vox	Podemos	Adelante Andalucía (2021)	ConA	CSí	AC	Lead
2023 municipal election	28 May 2023	—N/a	61.7	–	40.1; 14	20.0; 7	1.7; 0	4.6; 0	1.7; 0	19.6; 6	–	2.3; 0	3.8; 0	20.1
GAD3/RTVE–FORTA	2–27 May 2023	?	?	–	? 11/12	? 6/7	? 0	? 2	? 1	? 6	–	–	–	?
Dataestudios/ABC	3–9 May 2023	402	?	–	38.8; 12/13	16.7; 5/6	2.1; 0	5.2; 0/1	1.1; 0	25.1; 8/9	–	4.9; 0/1	2.9; 0	13.7
CENTRA/CEA	8–10 Nov 2022	800	?	–	43.1; 13/14	17.6; 5/6	4.5; 0	2.2; 0		26.7; 8	3.0; 0	–	–	16.4
Social Data/Grupo Viva	20–31 Dec 2021	601	?	–	28.3; 8	20.1; 6	2.4; 0	7.0; 2	(Note: Within AA.)	36.6; 11	–	–	–	8.3
GAD3/La Voz de Cádiz	3–10 Dec 2021	602	?	–	33.4; 10	19.1; 5/6	7.2; 1/2	7.7; 2		27.2; 8	2.8; 0	–	–	6.2
Adelante Cádiz	20 Jun 2021	543	?	38.8; 12	27.6; 9	14.5; 4	5.6; 1	5.8; 1	(Note: Within Adelante.)	–	–	–	–	11.2
ElectoPanel/Electomanía	1 Apr–15 Jun 2020	?	?	39.6; 12	29.2; 9	18.9; 5	4.4; 0	5.4; 1		–	–	–	–	10.4
2019 municipal election	26 May 2019	—N/a	62.6	43.6; 13	22.0; 6	17.2; 5	11.0; 3	3.8; 0		–	–	–	–	21.6

=== Chiclana de la Frontera ===
Polling firm/Commissioner	Fieldwork date	Sample size	Turnout	PSOE–A	PP	CS	Podemos	IULV	GCH	Vox	Lead
2023 municipal election	28 May 2023	—N/a	48.0	39.5; 11	30.7; 9	2.2; 0	3.1; 0	7.6; 2	2.7; 0	10.7; 3	8.8
GAD3	22 May 2022	545	?	39.8; 12	27.5; 8	? 0/1	? 1	? 1	? 0	? 3	12.3
2019 municipal election	26 May 2019	—N/a	46.6	33.2; 9	21.7; 6	13.6; 3	8.4; 2	7.6; 2	6.8; 2	6.6; 1	11.5

=== Córdoba ===
Color key:

Poll conducted after legal ban on opinion polls

Polling firm/Commissioner	Fieldwork date	Sample size	Turnout	PP	PSOE–A	CS	IULV	Vox	Podemos	HCO	Lead
2023 municipal election	28 May 2023	—N/a	58.3	46.3; 15	21.8; 7	1.5; 0	(Note: Within Hacemos Córdoba.)	11.9; 3		13.0; 4	24.5
GAD3/RTVE–FORTA	2–27 May 2023	?	?	? 14	? 7	? 0		? 4		? 4	?
UCO	10–20 Apr 2023	402	?	38.0; 12/13	24.5; 7/8	1.8; 0		8.7; 2/3		22.5; 7	13.5
UCO	9–19 Jan 2023	402	?	35.9; 11	28.2; 9	7.8; 1/2		10.3; 3		13.5; 4/5	7.7
CENTRA/CEA	15–17 Nov 2022	1,000	?	48.0; 15/16	27.4; 8/9	4.2; 0	5.9; 1/2	6.2; 2	4.7; 0/1	–	20.6
PP	5–15 Sep 2022	405	?	42.9; 14	20.0; 6	5.3; 1		12.2; 3		16.1; 5	22.9
UCO	16–31 May 2022	400	?	39.0; 13	24.6; 8	5.8; 1	13.4; 4	9.6; 3	3.2; 0	–	14.4
UCO	15 Oct–15 Nov 2020	400	58.0	33.1; 10	25.8; 8	12.4; 3	10.4; 3	9.6; 3	6.3; 2	–	7.3
2019 municipal election	26 May 2019	—N/a	56.4	29.8; 9	26.9; 8	15.2; 5	10.7; 3	8.0; 2	6.1; 2	–	2.9

=== El Ejido ===
Polling firm/Commissioner	Fieldwork date	Sample size	Turnout	PP	Vox	PSOE–A	CS	IULV	Podemos	ConA	Lead
2023 municipal election	28 May 2023	—N/a	52.1	47.2; 14	22.2; 6	16.3; 5	2.3; 0			3.0; 0	25.0
EM-Analytics/Electomanía	13 May–22 Oct 2021	351	?	39.1; 11	30.1; 8	20.7; 6	3.9; 0	–	2.2; 0	–	9.0
2019 municipal election	26 May 2019	—N/a	55.7	32.6; 9	24.8; 7	18.9; 5	13.9; 4	4.6; 0	1.9; 0	–	7.8

=== El Puerto de Santa María ===
Polling firm/Commissioner	Fieldwork date	Sample size	Turnout	PP	PSOE–A	Adelante Andalucía (2018)	CS	Vox	UP	L	AxSí	IULV	Podemos	Adelante Andalucía (2021)	Lead
2023 municipal election	28 May 2023	—N/a	55.3	46.5; 14	18.6; 5	–	1.3; 0	10.4; 3	9.7; 2	–	0.6; 0	5.8; 1	1.6; 0	2.4; 0	27.9
Social Data/Grupo Viva	12–16 Dec 2022	800	?	38.7; 11/12	24.8; 6/7	10.2; 2/3	0.8; 0	9.9; 2/3	8.9; 2	–	–			–	13.9
Social Data/Grupo Viva	4–11 Nov 2021	800	?	40.8; 12	17.6; 5	9.8; 2	5.0; 1	13.4; 3	8.3; 2	1.3; 0	1.2; 0			–	23.2
2019 municipal election	26 May 2019	—N/a	53.6	29.4; 9	27.1; 8	11.1; 3	9.4; 2	7.5; 2	6.0; 1	4.8; 0	3.8; 0			–	2.3

=== Fuente de Piedra ===
Polling firm/Commissioner	Fieldwork date	Sample size	Turnout	PSOE–A	Adelante	PP	Vox	Lead
Deimos Estadística	15 May 2021	265	?	50.5; 6	25.3; 3	18.0; 2	6.0; 0	25.2
2019 municipal election	26 May 2019	—N/a	79.3	51.8; 6	38.9; 4	8.4; 1	–	12.9

=== Granada ===
Color key:

Poll conducted after legal ban on opinion polls

Polling firm/Commissioner	Fieldwork date	Sample size	Turnout	PSOE–A	PP	CS	Adelante	Vox	Podemos	GU	Adelante Andalucía (2021)	Lead
2023 municipal election	28 May 2023	—N/a	61.6	33.1; 10	45.3; 15	1.0; 0	–	8.4; 2	3.0; 0	4.6; 0	0.8; 0	?
GAD3/RTVE–FORTA	2–27 May 2023	?	?	? 9	? 12/13	? 0	–	? 4	? 0/1	–	–	?
GAD3/Vocento	8–10 May 2023	?	?	30.5; 9/10	39.8; 12/13	1.3; 0	–	12.7; 4	5.3; 1	4.2; 0	2.9; 0	9.3
CENTRA/CEA	28–30 Nov 2022	1,000	?	32.5; 9/10	41.7; 13/14	2.3; 0	9.3; 2/3	6.1; 1/2			–	9.2
ElectoPanel/Electomanía	1 Apr–15 Jun 2020	?	?	25.5; 8	26.1; 9	3.9; 0	17.1; 5	17.4; 5			–	0.6
2019 municipal election	26 May 2019	—N/a	60.9	32.5; 10	23.8; 7	14.8; 4	10.0; 3	9.5; 3			–	8.7

=== Huelva ===
Color key:

Poll conducted after legal ban on opinion polls

Polling firm/Commissioner	Fieldwork date	Sample size	Turnout	PSOE–A	PP	CS	Adelante	MRH	Vox	ConA	Adelante Andalucía (2021)	Lead
2023 municipal election	28 May 2023	—N/a	54.4	33.3; 11	41.1; 13	2.3; 0	–	3.6; 0	7.9; 2	5.9; 1	–	7.8
GAD3/RTVE–FORTA	2–27 May 2023	?	?	? 11/12	? 12	? 0	–	? 0	? 2/3	? 1	–	?
Dataestudios/ABC	8–12 May 2023	400	?	28.2; 8/9	42.9; 13/14	3.5; 0	–	5.1; 0/1	6.4; 2	6.5; 2	2.6; 0	14.7
GAD3/Azahara	21–24 Apr 2023	605	?	36.1; 11/12	39.6; 13	1.9; 0	–	3.3; 0	7.5; 2	5.0; 0/1	3.8; 0	3.5
CENTRA/CEA	12–16 Jan 2023	800	?	31.5; 10/11	42.5; 13/14	3.5; 0	–	4.1; 0	7.1; 2	4.7; 0/1	–	11.0
2019 municipal election	26 May 2019	—N/a	51.2	45.2; 14	16.1; 4	9.7; 3	9.4; 2	7.8; 2	6.8; 2	–	–	29.1

=== Jaén ===
Color key:

Poll conducted after legal ban on opinion polls

Polling firm/Commissioner	Fieldwork date	Sample size	Turnout	PSOE–A	PP	CS	Adelante	Vox	Podemos	IULV	Adelante Andalucía (2021)	Jaén Merece Más	Lead
2023 municipal election	28 May 2023	—N/a	63.1	36.8; 11	36.2; 11	0.6; 0	–	8.6; 2	1.7; 0	1.7; 0	–	12.5; 3	0.6
GAD3/RTVE–FORTA	2–27 May 2023	?	?	? 10/11	? 12	? 0	–	? 2	–	–	–	? 2/3	?
CENTRA/CEA	12–14 Dec 2022	800	?	38.3; 12	39.6; 13	3.7; 0	2.9; 0	7.8; 2			–	–	1.3
EM-Analytics/Electomanía	13 May–18 Sep 2021	364	?	38.0; 12	36.6; 12	3.8; 0	4.0; 0	9.4; 3			3.2; 0	–	1.4
2019 municipal election	26 May 2019	—N/a	59.9	37.0; 11	27.0; 8	15.4; 4	6.3; 2	6.3; 2			–	–	10.0

=== Jerez de la Frontera ===
Color key:

Poll conducted after legal ban on opinion polls

Polling firm/Commissioner	Fieldwork date	Sample size	Turnout	PSOE–A	PP	CS	Adelante	GJ	Vox	AxSí	Podemos	IULV	ConA	Adelante Andalucía (2021)	Lead
2023 municipal election	28 May 2023	—N/a	56.3	29.9; 9	42.8; 14	2.3; 0	–	(Note: Within IULV.)	8.5; 2	1.9; 0	1.5; 0	6.9; 2	–	3.1; 0	12.9
GAD3/RTVE–FORTA	2–27 May 2023	?	?	? 8/9	? 13/14	? 0	–		? 2/3	–	? 0/1	? 2	–	–	?
Social Data/CS	11 May 2023	500	?	34.0; 11/12	31.7; 10/11	5.5; 0/1	–		6.9; 1/2	–	2.7; 0	8.5; 2/3	–	5.8; 0/1	2.3
Social Data/Grupo Viva	10–11 Nov 2022	500	?	38.7; 13	35.5; 11	1.3; 0	–	3.1; 0	7.4; 2	2.6; 0	3.8; 0	5.4; 1	–	–	3.2
PoliticAnd	15–31 Oct 2022	600	53.5	32.5; 10/11	40.7; 13	1.7; 0	–	3.1; 0	5.7; 1	–	4.9; 0/1	8.0; 2	–	–	8.2
EM-Analytics/Electomanía	13 May–18 Sep 2021	352	?	31.1; 10	37.7; 12	3.2; 0	–	1.1; 0	8.2; 2	–			5.3; 1	8.3; 2	6.6
GAD3/PP	17–23 Jun 2021	601	?	26.8; 9	41.3; 13	4.2; 0	–	5.1; 1	9.0; 3	–	5.5; 1	3.3; 0	–	–	14.5
PoliticAnd	30 Nov–10 Dec 2020	500	53.4	38.1; 11/12	27.9; 8/9	8.3; 2	10.6; 3	3.4; 0	7.6; 2	–			–	–	10.2
2019 municipal election	26 May 2019	—N/a	52.2	32.1; 10	28.3; 9	13.7; 4	11.2; 3	5.3; 1	4.8; 0	0.8; 0			–	–	3.8

=== Málaga ===
Color key:

Poll conducted after legal ban on opinion polls

Polling firm/Commissioner	Fieldwork date	Sample size	Turnout	PP	PSOE–A	Adelante	CS	Vox	ConA	Adelante Andalucía (2021)	Lead
2023 municipal election	28 May 2023	—N/a	55.2	49.2; 17	29.2; 10	–	2.0; 0	7.7; 2	7.4; 2	1.1; 0	20.0
GAD3/RTVE–FORTA	2–27 May 2023	?	?	? 16	? 10	–	? 0	? 2	? 3	–	?
NC Report/La Razón	22 May 2023	?	?	48.1; 16	30.2; 11	–	–	6.4; 2	7.3; 2	–	17.9
GAD3/Vocento	26–27 Apr 2023	500	?	49.5; 16/17	29.1; 9/10	–	1.2; 0	6.1; 2	8.8; 3	–	20.4
NC Report/La Razón	24 Apr 2023	?	54.8	46.4; 16	30.5; 11	–	–	6.2; 2	6.8; 2	–	15.9
OndatelPolls	3–16 Apr 2023	1,300	50.6	41.9; 14	36.8; 13	–	2.4; 0	4.4; 0	12.4; 4	0.7; 0	5.1
Sigma Dos/El Mundo	10–15 Feb 2023	500	?	46.8; 16/17	28.8; 10	–	2.0; 0	6.6; 2	8.4; 2/3	2.5; 0	18.0
CENTRA/CEA	21–26 Oct 2022	1,500	?	47.4; 16/17	31.7; 11/12	–	1.9; 0	5.1; 0/1	8.5; 2	–	15.7
Dialoga Consultores/El Español	26 Sep–13 Oct 2021	1,200	?	? 14/15	? 9/10	–	? 0	? 3/4	? 2/3	–	?
EM-Analytics/Electomanía	11 Mar 2021	1,500	?	34.1; 12	35.0; 12	–	4.7; 0	14.9; 5	5.6; 2	3.9; 0	0.9
2019 municipal election	26 May 2019	—N/a	55.5	39.7; 14	32.5; 12	10.6; 3	7.8; 2	4.4; 0	–	–	7.2

=== Puente Genil ===
Polling firm/Commissioner	Fieldwork date	Sample size	Turnout	PSOE–A	PP	IULV	CS	Vox	Podemos	Lead
SW Demoscopia/Grupo Viva	28 Sep–7 Oct 2020	500	?	47.2; 10/11	23.8; 5/6	13.1; 3/4	6.5; 1/2	5.4; 0/1	3.2; 0	23.4
2019 municipal election	26 May 2019	—N/a	59.2	44.1; 10	22.2; 5	20.7; 5	8.0; 1	2.7; 0	1.3; 0	21.9

=== San Roque ===
Polling firm/Commissioner	Fieldwork date	Sample size	Turnout	PSOE–A	PP	SR100	Adelante Andalucía (2018)	CS	PIVG	Vox	Podemos	IULV	Lead
SW Demoscopia/PSOE	4–14 Jun 2021	701	?	46.9; 12	18.3; 4	11.4; 2	–	1.1; 0	5.1; 1	6.9; 1	5.3; 1	3.8; 0	28.6
2019 municipal election	26 May 2019	—N/a	57.7	44.8; 11	20.7; 5	8.4; 2	7.2; 1	7.2; 1	6.4; 1	4.3; 0			24.1

=== Utrera ===
Polling firm/Commissioner	Fieldwork date	Sample size	Turnout	PSOE–A	JxU	CS	PP	Vox	Podemos	Lead
Dialoga Consultores	3–7 Oct 2022	600	?	46.0; 13/14	20.1; 5/6	3.0; 0	14.8; 3/4	7.7; 1/2	4.9; 0/1	25.9
2019 municipal election	26 May 2019	—N/a	58.1	44.9; 14	32.7; 10	6.1; 1	4.2; 0	3.4; 0	3.1; 0	12.2

=== Vélez-Málaga ===
Polling firm/Commissioner	Fieldwork date	Sample size	Turnout	PP	PSOE–A	GI PMTM	AxSí	Podemos	CS	IULV	Vox	ConA	Lead
2023 municipal election	28 May 2023	—N/a	59.9	32.1; 9	12.6; 3	21.2; 6	20.4; 6		0.6; 0		5.4; 1	4.7; 0	8.4
Social Data/AxSí	27 Jan 2022	?	?	? 9	? 5	? 6	? 4	–	–	–	? 1	–	?
2019 municipal election	26 May 2019	—N/a	59.2	28.9; 9	20.5; 7	20.3; 7	6.6; 2	4.8; 0	4.0; 0	3.9; 0	3.7; 0	–	8.4
