= Opinion polling for the 2027 Spanish local elections (Andalusia) =

In the run up to the 2027 Spanish local elections, various organisations carry out opinion polling to gauge voting intention in local entities in Spain. Results of such polls for municipalities in Andalusia are displayed in this article. The date range for these opinion polls is from the previous local elections, held on 28 May 2023, to the day the next elections will be held, on 23 May 2027.

Polls are listed in reverse chronological order, showing the most recent first and using the dates when the survey fieldwork was done, as opposed to the date of publication. Where the fieldwork dates are unknown, the date of publication is given instead. The highest percentage figure in each polling survey is displayed with its background shaded in the leading party's colour. If a tie ensues, this is applied to the figures with the highest percentages. The "Lead" columns on the right shows the percentage-point difference between the parties with the highest percentages in a given poll.

== Municipalities ==
=== Alcalá de Guadaíra ===
Polling firm/Commissioner	Fieldwork date	Sample size	Turnout	PSOE–A	PP	Vox	ANI	AxSí	Lead
Idus3	19 Dec 2025	?	?	? 11/13	? 4/5	? 6/8	? 0	? 1/2	?
2023 municipal election	28 May 2023	—N/a	53.9	36.6; 11	20.6; 6	14.3; 4	8.6; 2	6.6; 2	16.0

=== Algeciras ===
Polling firm/Commissioner	Fieldwork date	Sample size	Turnout	PP	PSOE–A	Vox	IULV	100x 100	Lead
Social Data/Grupo Viva	26 Jun–3 Jul 2025	500	?	46.9; 16/17	19.9; 5/6	18.4; 5/6	2.6; 0	5.1; 0/1	27.0
2023 municipal election	28 May 2023	—N/a	63.4	53.1; 16	22.2; 7	13.3; 4	4.8; 0	–	30.9

=== Almuñécar ===
Polling firm/Commissioner	Fieldwork date	Sample size	Turnout	PP	CA	PSOE–A	IULV	Vox	Lead
NC Report	6–20 Jun 2025	500	?	53.5; 13	24.4; 5	10.4; 2	5.9; 1	3.2; 0	29.1
2023 municipal election	28 May 2023	—N/a	63.4	50.3; 12	26.5; 6	11.0; 2	5.1; 1	4.6; 0	23.8

=== Arcos de la Frontera ===
Polling firm/Commissioner	Fieldwork date	Sample size	Turnout	PP	PSOE–A	AiPro	IULV	Vox	Lead
8TV	10–12 Jun 2026	500	?	46.9; 11/12	28.8; 6/7	5.2; 0/1	6.3; 1	7.5; 1/2	18.1
2023 municipal election	28 May 2023	—N/a	60.7	35.8; 9	35.7; 8	14.6; 3	6.7; 1	5.0; 0	0.1

=== Bormujos ===
Polling firm/Commissioner	Fieldwork date	Sample size	Turnout	PP	PSOE–A	Vox	CS	BxD	Podemos	Lead
Dataestudios	2–6 Jun 2025	400	?	45.3; 11	27.6; 6/7	10.1; 2	–	4.9; 0/1	5.9; 1	17.7
2023 municipal election	28 May 2023	—N/a	58.7	37.0; 9	30.9; 8	9.3; 2	6.2; 1	5.9; 1	4.9; 0	6.1

=== Cádiz ===
Polling firm/Commissioner	Fieldwork date	Sample size	Turnout	PP	PSOE–A	Adelante Andalucía (2021)	Vox	AC	Lead
Social Data/Grupo Viva	9–20 Oct 2026	600	?	42.6; 13	18.2; 5	26.0; 8	6.1; 1	2.1; 0	16.6
Social Data/Grupo Viva	26 May–3 Jun 2025	500	?	44.9; 14/15	21.0; 6/7	17.9; 5/6	4.8; 0/1	0.8; 0	23.9
2023 municipal election	28 May 2023	—N/a	61.7	40.1; 14	20.0; 7	19.6; 6	4.6; 0	3.8; 0	20.1

=== Chiclana de la Frontera ===
Polling firm/Commissioner	Fieldwork date	Sample size	Turnout	PSOE–A	PP	Vox	IULV	Adelante Andalucía (2021)	SALF	100x 100	Lead
8TV	2–5 Jun 2026	500	?	37.8; 11	29.1; 8/9	10.9; 3	6.5; 1/2	4.9; 0/1	3.5; 0	2.9; 0	8.7
2023 municipal election	28 May 2023	—N/a	48.0	39.5; 11	30.7; 9	10.7; 3	7.6; 2	3.1; 0	–	–	8.8

=== Conil de la Frontera ===
Polling firm/Commissioner	Fieldwork date	Sample size	Turnout	IULV	AxSí	PP	PSOE–A	100x 100	Vox	Lead
8TV	17–19 Jun 2026	500	?	24.2; 5/6	17.0; 3/4	24.4; 5/6	17.0; 3/4	7.1; 1	4.3; 0/1	0.2
2023 municipal election	28 May 2023	—N/a	63.4	27.4; 7	23.0; 5	19.4; 4	13.1; 3	11.1; 2	3.1; 0	4.4

=== Córdoba ===
Polling firm/Commissioner	Fieldwork date	Sample size	Turnout	PP	PSOE–A	HCO	Vox	CS	Lead
Inteligencia Global/Diario Córdoba	20–24 Jan 2025	400	?	48.7; 16/17	20.1; 6/7	10.8; 3/4	11.4; 3/4	–	28.6
PP	10–18 Dec 2024	411	?	47.6; 15	18.8; 6	9.3; 3	18.3; 5	1.0; 0	28.8
PP	15–23 May 2024	421	?	49.3; 16	20.4; 6	? 4	? 3	–	28.9
2023 municipal election	28 May 2023	—N/a	58.2	46.3; 15	21.8; 7	13.0; 4	11.9; 3	1.5; 0	24.5

=== Huércal de Almería ===
Polling firm/Commissioner	Fieldwork date	Sample size	Turnout	PP	PSOE–A	GRINPH	Vox	UPxA	Lead
Dialoga Consultores	31 Oct 2025	400	?	70.0; 14	5.0; 0/1	5.0; 0/1	7.0; 1	6.0; 1	63.0
2023 municipal election	28 May 2023	—N/a	60.0	63.7; 13	9.1; 1	7.4; 1	7.0; 1	7.0; 1	54.6

=== Jerez de la Frontera ===
Polling firm/Commissioner	Fieldwork date	Sample size	Turnout	PP	PSOE–A	Vox	IULV	Adelante Andalucía (2021)	GJ	100x 100	Lead
Social Data/Grupo Viva	9–13 Jul 2026	400	?	49.8; 15/16	17.2; 6/7	6.7; 1/2	4.2; 0/1	14.4; 4/5	2.3; 0	1.0; 0	32.6
2023 municipal election	28 May 2023	—N/a	56.3	42.8; 14	29.9; 9	8.5; 2	6.9; 2	3.1; 0	(Note: Within IULV.)	–	12.9

=== Punta Umbría ===
Polling firm/Commissioner	Fieldwork date	Sample size	Turnout	UPU	PSOE–A	PP	ConA	Vox	AxSí	Lead
Social Data/Grupo Viva	19–23 Oct 2026	500	?	43.5; 8/9	23.5; 4/5	17.9; 3	6.1; 1	5.6; 0/1	2.4; 0	20.0
2023 municipal election	28 May 2023	—N/a	64.7	43.0; 8	24.9; 4	20.2; 4	5.3; 1	3.9; 0	–	18.1

=== San Fernando ===
Polling firm/Commissioner	Fieldwork date	Sample size	Turnout	PSOE–A	PP	Vox	AxSí	IULV	Podemos	Lead
Social Data/Grupo Viva	8–24 Apr 2026	600	?	48.1; 13/14	18.4; 5/6	14.2; 3/4	8.2; 1/2	4.1; 0/1	2.3; 0	29.7
2023 municipal election	28 May 2023	—N/a	52.3	46.0; 13	25.6; 7	11.9; 3	6.9; 2	3.1; 0	2.8; 0	20.4

=== Sanlúcar de Barrameda ===
Polling firm/Commissioner	Fieldwork date	Sample size	Turnout	PP	IULV	PSOE–A	Vox	Lead
Celeste-Tel	14–20 Aug 2025	502	50.1	30.3; 8	30.5; 8	23.1; 6	12.7; 3	0.2
2023 municipal election	28 May 2023	—N/a	48.8	32.2; 9	28.0; 7	25.6; 7	9.4; 2	4.2
