= 2019 Spanish local elections in Andalusia =

This article presents the results breakdown of the local elections held in Andalusia on 26 May 2019. The following tables show detailed results in the autonomous community's most populous municipalities, sorted alphabetically.

== City control ==
The following table lists party control in the most populous municipalities, including provincial capitals (shown in bold). Gains for a party are displayed with the cell's background shaded in that party's colour.

Municipality	Population	Previous control	New control
Alcalá de Guadaíra	75,256	Spanish Socialist Workers' Party of Andalusia (PSOE–A)	Spanish Socialist Workers' Party of Andalusia (PSOE–A)
Algeciras	121,414	People's Party (PP)	People's Party (PP)
**Almería**	196,851	People's Party (PP)	People's Party (PP)
Antequera	41,154	People's Party (PP)	People's Party (PP)
Benalmádena	67,746	Spanish Socialist Workers' Party of Andalusia (PSOE–A)	Spanish Socialist Workers' Party of Andalusia (PSOE–A)
**Cádiz**	116,979	Forward Andalusia (Adelante)	Forward Andalusia (Adelante)
Chiclana de la Frontera	83,831	Spanish Socialist Workers' Party of Andalusia (PSOE–A)	Spanish Socialist Workers' Party of Andalusia (PSOE–A)
**Córdoba**	325,708	Spanish Socialist Workers' Party of Andalusia (PSOE–A)	People's Party (PP)
Dos Hermanas	133,168	Spanish Socialist Workers' Party of Andalusia (PSOE–A)	Spanish Socialist Workers' Party of Andalusia (PSOE–A)
Écija	39,882	Spanish Socialist Workers' Party of Andalusia (PSOE–A)	Spanish Socialist Workers' Party of Andalusia (PSOE–A)
El Ejido	84,710	People's Party (PP)	People's Party (PP)
El Puerto de Santa María	88,364	Spanish Socialist Workers' Party of Andalusia (PSOE–A)	People's Party (PP)
Estepona	67,012	People's Party (PP)	People's Party (PP)
Fuengirola	75,396	People's Party (PP)	People's Party (PP)
**Granada**	232,208	Spanish Socialist Workers' Party of Andalusia (PSOE–A)	Citizens–Party of the Citizenry (Cs) (PSOE–A in 2021)
**Huelva**	144,258	Spanish Socialist Workers' Party of Andalusia (PSOE–A)	Spanish Socialist Workers' Party of Andalusia (PSOE–A)
**Jaén**	113,457	People's Party (PP)	Spanish Socialist Workers' Party of Andalusia (PSOE–A)
Jerez de la Frontera	212,879	Spanish Socialist Workers' Party of Andalusia (PSOE–A)	Spanish Socialist Workers' Party of Andalusia (PSOE–A)
La Línea de la Concepción	62,940	La Línea 100x100 (LL100x100)	La Línea 100x100 (LL100x100)
Linares	57,811	Spanish Socialist Workers' Party of Andalusia (PSOE–A)	Citizens–Party of the Citizenry (Cs) (PSOE–A in 2022)
**Málaga**	571,026	People's Party (PP)	People's Party (PP)
Marbella	141,463	People's Party (PP)	People's Party (PP)
Mijas	80,630	Citizens–Party of the Citizenry (Cs)	Spanish Socialist Workers' Party of Andalusia (PSOE–A)
Morón de la Frontera	27,844	Spanish Socialist Workers' Party of Andalusia (PSOE–A)	Spanish Socialist Workers' Party of Andalusia (PSOE–A)
Motril	58,078	Spanish Socialist Workers' Party of Andalusia (PSOE–A)	People's Party (PP)
Ronda	33,978	Spanish Socialist Workers' Party of Andalusia (PSOE–A)	People's Party (PP)
Roquetas de Mar	94,925	People's Party (PP)	People's Party (PP)
San Fernando	95,174	Spanish Socialist Workers' Party of Andalusia (PSOE–A)	Spanish Socialist Workers' Party of Andalusia (PSOE–A)
Sanlúcar de Barrameda	68,037	Spanish Socialist Workers' Party of Andalusia (PSOE–A)	Spanish Socialist Workers' Party of Andalusia (PSOE–A)
**Seville**	688,711	Spanish Socialist Workers' Party of Andalusia (PSOE–A)	Spanish Socialist Workers' Party of Andalusia (PSOE–A)
Torremolinos	68,262	Spanish Socialist Workers' Party of Andalusia (PSOE–A)	Spanish Socialist Workers' Party of Andalusia (PSOE–A) (PP in 2021)
Utrera	50,250	Spanish Socialist Workers' Party of Andalusia (PSOE–A)	Spanish Socialist Workers' Party of Andalusia (PSOE–A)
Vélez-Málaga	80,817	Spanish Socialist Workers' Party of Andalusia (PSOE–A)	Spanish Socialist Workers' Party of Andalusia (PSOE–A)

== Municipalities ==
=== Alcalá de Guadaíra ===
Population: 75,256

← Summary of the 26 May 2019 City Council of Alcalá de Guadaíra election results →
Parties and alliances	Popular vote			Seats	
Parties and alliances	Votes	%	±pp	Total	+/−
Spanish Socialist Workers' Party of Andalusia (PSOE–A)	10,488	34.48	+2.79	10	+1
Forward Alcalá: We Can–United Left–Andalusian Spring (Adelante)^{1}	4,244	13.95	−12.53	4	−3
People's Party (PP)	3,573	11.75	−6.59	3	−2
Citizens–Party of the Citizenry (Cs)	3,471	11.41	+4.26	3	+1
Vox (Vox)	3,107	10.22	New	3	+3
Andalusia by Herself (AxSí)^{2}	2,649	8.71	−0.93	2	±0
Alcalá 100% (A100%)	1,045	3.44	New	0	±0
Assembly of Alcalá (AdeA)	903	2.97	New	0	±0
Left Socialist Initiative (ISA)	404	1.33	New	0	±0
Alcalá First (Primero Alcalá)	204	0.67	New	0	±0
Blank ballots	326	1.07	−0.45		
Total	30,414			25	±0
Valid votes	30,414	98.80	−0.05		
Invalid votes	369	1.20	+0.05		
Votes cast / turnout	30,783	53.47	−2.36		
Abstentions	26,792	46.53	+2.36		
Registered voters	57,575				
Sources
Footnotes: ^{1} Forward Alcalá: We Can–United Left–Andalusian Spring results are compared to the combined totals of Alcalá Can and United Left/The Greens–Assembly and Alcalá Alternative in the 2015 election.; ^{2} Andalusia by Herself results are compared to Andalusian Party totals in the 2015 election.

=== Algeciras ===
Population: 121,414

← Summary of the 26 May 2019 City Council of Algeciras election results →
Parties and alliances	Popular vote			Seats	
Parties and alliances	Votes	%	±pp	Total	+/−
People's Party (PP)	18,053	41.26	−2.62	13	−1
Spanish Socialist Workers' Party of Andalusia (PSOE–A)	11,626	26.57	+5.01	8	+2
Forward Algeciras (Adelante)^{1}	4,086	9.34	−9.78	2	−3
Vox (Vox)	3,610	8.25	New	2	+2
Citizens–Party of the Citizenry (Cs)	3,486	7.97	+0.55	2	±0
Algeciras 100x100 (AL 100x100)	893	2.04	New	0	±0
Free (Libres)	583	1.33	New	0	±0
Andalusia by Herself Between All (ENTRA)^{2}	513	1.17	−2.20	0	±0
The Voice of Algeciras (LVA)	363	0.83	New	0	±0
Renaissance and Union of Europe Party (PRUNE)	119	0.27	New	0	±0
Republican Alternative (ALTER)	82	0.19	New	0	±0
Blank ballots	339	0.77	−0.63		
Total	43,753			27	±0
Valid votes	43,753	99.28	−0.04		
Invalid votes	317	0.72	+0.04		
Votes cast / turnout	44,070	49.07	+3.26		
Abstentions	45,736	50.93	−3.26		
Registered voters	89,806				
Sources
Footnotes: ^{1} Forward Algeciras results are compared to the combined totals of Algeciras Yes We Can and United Left/The Greens–Assembly for Andalusia in the 2015 election.; ^{2} Andalusia by Herself Between All results are compared to Andalusian Party totals in the 2015 election.

=== Almería ===
Population: 196,851

← Summary of the 26 May 2019 City Council of Almería election results →
Parties and alliances	Popular vote			Seats	
Parties and alliances	Votes	%	±pp	Total	+/−
People's Party (PP)	34,087	43.45	+3.09	13	±0
Spanish Socialist Workers' Party of Andalusia (PSOE–A)	23,588	30.07	+3.07	9	±0
Vox (Vox)	6,095	7.77	+7.36	2	+2
Citizens–Party of the Citizenry (Cs)	6,019	7.67	−2.34	2	−1
We Can (Podemos)^{1}	4,152	5.29	+1.84	1	+1
United Left Andalusia–Equo–For the People (IU–Equo–PG)^{2}	3,306	4.21	−4.69	0	−2
Rebel Almería (NA–IZAR–PCPA)^{3}	190	0.24	+0.01	0	±0
Blank Seats (EB)	173	0.22	New	0	±0
Left for Almería (IPAL)	141	0.18	New	0	±0
Spanish Phalanx of the CNSO (FE de las JONS)	54	0.07	−0.03	0	±0
Blank ballots	645	0.82	−0.52		
Total	78,450			27	±0
Valid votes	78,450	99.43	+0.11		
Invalid votes	451	0.57	−0.11		
Votes cast / turnout	78,901	54.87	+2.02		
Abstentions	64,901	45.13	−2.02		
Registered voters	143,802				
Sources
Footnotes: ^{1} We Can results are compared to Let's Win Almería Yes We Can totals in the 2015 election.; ^{2} United Left Andalusia–Equo–For the People results are compared to the combined totals of United Left/The Greens–Assembly–Almería for the People and Equo in the 2015 election.; ^{3} Rebel Almería results are compared to Communist Party of the Peoples of Spain totals in the 2015 election.

=== Antequera ===
Population: 41,154

← Summary of the 26 May 2019 City Council of Antequera election results →
Parties and alliances	Popular vote			Seats	
Parties and alliances	Votes	%	±pp	Total	+/−
People's Party (PP)	9,286	46.93	+0.64	11	±0
Spanish Socialist Workers' Party of Andalusia (PSOE–A)	6,331	31.99	−2.54	7	−1
Forward Antequera (Adelante)^{1}	2,399	12.12	−2.27	2	±0
Citizens–Party of the Citizenry (Cs)	1,036	5.24	New	1	+1
Vox (Vox)	392	1.98	New	0	±0
Party of the Annexes and the Neighbourhoods of Antequera (PABA)	182	0.92	−1.57	0	±0
Blank ballots	162	0.82	−0.67		
Total	19,788			21	±0
Valid votes	19,788	99.31	+0.30		
Invalid votes	138	0.69	−0.30		
Votes cast / turnout	19,926	61.91	+0.37		
Abstentions	12,260	38.09	−0.37		
Registered voters	32,186				
Sources
Footnotes: ^{1} Forward Antequera results are compared to the combined totals of United Left/The Greens–Assembly–Antequera for the People and Antequera Yes We Can in the 2015 election.

=== Benalmádena ===
Population: 67,746

← Summary of the 26 May 2019 City Council of Benalmádena election results →
Parties and alliances	Popular vote			Seats	
Parties and alliances	Votes	%	±pp	Total	+/−
Spanish Socialist Workers' Party of Andalusia (PSOE–A)^{1}	8,389	37.45	+5.71	11	+3
People's Party (PP)^{2}	4,940	22.05	−13.85	7	−3
Citizens–Party of the Citizenry (Cs)	2,457	10.97	+0.57	3	±0
United Left Andalusia (IU–Andalucía)	1,837	8.20	−0.05	2	±0
Vox (Vox)	1,414	6.31	New	2	+2
For my Town (Por mi Pueblo)	1,095	4.89	New	0	±0
We Can (Podemos)	1,007	4.50	New	0	±0
We Are Benalmádena (SBM)	683	3.05	New	0	±0
With You, We Are Democracy (Contigo)	350	1.56	New	0	±0
More Andalusia–Costa del Sol Can–We Can 15M (Mas.CSSP)	95	0.42	−7.99	0	−2
Blank ballots	132	0.59	−0.71		
Total	22,399			25	±0
Valid votes	22,399	99.34	+0.19		
Invalid votes	148	0.66	−0.19		
Votes cast / turnout	22,547	51.69	+1.89		
Abstentions	21,071	48.31	−1.89		
Registered voters	43,618				
Sources
Footnotes: ^{1} Spanish Socialist Workers' Party of Andalusia results are compared to the combined totals of Spanish Socialist Workers' Party of Andalusia and Alternative for Benalmádena in the 2015 election.; ^{2} People's Party results are compared to the combined totals of People's Party and Neighbours for Benalmádena in the 2015 election.

=== Cádiz ===
Population: 116,979

← Summary of the 26 May 2019 City Council of Cádiz election results →
Parties and alliances	Popular vote			Seats	
Parties and alliances	Votes	%	±pp	Total	+/−
Forward Cádiz: We Can–Winning Cádiz in Common–United Left (Adelante)^{1}	26,498	43.59	+7.30	13	+3
People's Party (PP)	13,397	22.04	−11.80	6	−4
Spanish Socialist Workers' Party of Andalusia (PSOE–A)	10,474	17.23	−0.09	5	±0
Citizens–Party of the Citizenry (Cs)	6,659	10.95	+3.80	3	+1
Vox (Vox)	2,294	3.77	+3.49	0	±0
Animalist Party Against Mistreatment of Animals (PACMA)	742	1.22	−0.58	0	±0
Republican Alternative (ALTER)	177	0.29	New	0	±0
For a Fairer World (PUM+J)	136	0.22	New	0	±0
Blank ballots	416	0.68	−0.17		
Total	60,793			27	±0
Valid votes	60,793	99.33	−0.06		
Invalid votes	410	0.67	+0.06		
Votes cast / turnout	61,203	62.64	−2.62		
Abstentions	36,496	37.36	+2.62		
Registered voters	97,699				
Sources
Footnotes: ^{1} Forward Cádiz: We Can–Winning Cádiz in Common–United Left results are compared to the combined totals of For Cádiz Yes We Can and Winning Cádiz in Common in the 2015 election.

=== Chiclana de la Frontera ===
Population: 83,831

← Summary of the 26 May 2019 City Council of Chiclana de la Frontera election results →
Parties and alliances	Popular vote			Seats	
Parties and alliances	Votes	%	±pp	Total	+/−
Spanish Socialist Workers' Party of Andalusia (PSOE–A)	9,922	33.19	−3.60	9	−2
People's Party (PP)	6,491	21.71	−4.87	6	−2
Citizens–Party of the Citizenry (Cs)	4,070	13.61	New	3	+3
We Can (Podemos)^{1}	2,519	8.43	−1.45	2	±0
United Left Andalusia (IU–Andalucía)	2,263	7.57	−3.58	2	−1
Let's Win Chiclana (GCH)	2,045	6.84	+1.04	2	+1
Vox (Vox)	1,972	6.60	New	1	+1
Actual Equality (IGRE)	123	0.41	New	0	±0
Blank Seats (EB)	106	0.35	New	0	±0
Blank ballots	386	1.29	−1.44		
Total	29,897			25	±0
Valid votes	29,897	99.26	+0.22		
Invalid votes	223	0.74	−0.22		
Votes cast / turnout	30,120	46.64	−2.04		
Abstentions	34,463	53.36	+2.04		
Registered voters	64,583				
Sources
Footnotes: ^{1} We Can results are compared to For Chiclana Yes We Can totals in the 2015 election.

=== Córdoba ===
Population: 325,708

← Summary of the 26 May 2019 City Council of Córdoba election results →
Parties and alliances	Popular vote			Seats	
Parties and alliances	Votes	%	±pp	Total	+/−
People's Party (PP)	43,738	29.83	−4.82	9	−2
Spanish Socialist Workers' Party of Andalusia (PSOE–A)	39,509	26.95	+6.37	8	+1
Citizens–Party of the Citizenry (Cs)	22,252	15.18	+6.56	5	+3
United Left Andalusia (IU–Andalucía)	15,755	10.75	−1.26	3	−1
Vox (Vox)	11,681	7.97	+7.62	2	+2
We Can (Podemos)^{1}	8,924	6.09	−6.48	2	−2
Animalist Party Against Mistreatment of Animals (PACMA)	1,617	1.10	−0.07	0	±0
Action for Córdoba (acciónxcórdoba)	867	0.59	New	0	±0
Let's Win (Ganemos)	328	0.22	New	0	±0
Together, Yes We Can (Entre Tod@s)	226	0.15	−0.92	0	±0
Communist Party of the Workers of Spain (PCTE)	209	0.14	New	0	±0
Blank Seats (EB)	202	0.14	−0.14	0	±0
For a Fairer World (PUM+J)	162	0.11	−0.05	0	±0
Cordobese Union (UCOR)	n/a	n/a	−5.66	0	−1
Blank ballots	1,143	0.78	−0.60		
Total	146,613			29	±0
Valid votes	146,613	99.39	+0.08		
Invalid votes	906	0.61	−0.08		
Votes cast / turnout	147,519	56.43	−0.64		
Abstentions	113,898	43.57	+0.64		
Registered voters	261,417				
Sources
Footnotes: ^{1} We Can results are compared to Let's Win Córdoba totals in the 2015 election.

=== Dos Hermanas ===
Population: 133,168

← Summary of the 26 May 2019 City Council of Dos Hermanas election results →
Parties and alliances	Popular vote			Seats	
Parties and alliances	Votes	%	±pp	Total	+/−
Spanish Socialist Workers' Party of Andalusia (PSOE–A)	27,154	50.44	+1.92	16	+1
Forward Dos Hermanas: We Can–United Left–Andalusian Spring (Adelante)^{1}	7,069	13.13	+6.61	4	+2
Citizens–Party of the Citizenry (Cs)	6,038	11.22	+1.82	3	+1
People's Party (PP)	4,632	8.60	−4.92	2	−2
Vox (Vox)	4,454	8.27	+7.69	2	+2
100% Andalusian (100% andaluces)	1,212	2.25	New	0	±0
Yes We Can Dos Hermanas (SSPDH)	1,006	1.87	−14.20	0	−4
Advancing For You (Avanzamos)	878	1.63	New	0	±0
With You, We Are Democracy (Contigo)	756	1.40	New	0	±0
Local and Global (LyG)	134	0.25	−0.36	0	±0
Blank ballots	500	0.93	−0.48		
Total	53,833			27	±0
Valid votes	53,833	99.26	+0.32		
Invalid votes	404	0.74	−0.32		
Votes cast / turnout	54,237	52.98	+1.80		
Abstentions	48,142	47.02	−1.80		
Registered voters	102,379				
Sources
Footnotes: ^{1} Forward Dos Hermanas: We Can–United Left–Andalusian Spring results are compared to United Left/The Greens–Assembly for Andalusia totals in the 2015 election.

=== Écija ===
Population: 39,882

← Summary of the 26 May 2019 City Council of Écija election results →
Parties and alliances	Popular vote			Seats	
Parties and alliances	Votes	%	±pp	Total	+/−
Spanish Socialist Workers' Party of Andalusia (PSOE–A)	6,080	33.04	−0.94	8	±0
People's Party (PP)	5,132	27.89	−0.63	7	±0
Ecijan Force (FuE)	1,597	8.68	+3.24	2	+1
Citizens–Party of the Citizenry (Cs)	1,274	6.92	New	1	+1
United Left/The Greens–Assembly for Andalusia (IULV–CA)	1,049	5.70	−2.44	1	±0
Vox (Vox)	967	5.25	New	1	+1
We Can (Podemos)^{1}	959	5.21	−3.51	1	−1
Andalusia by Herself (AxSí)^{2}	876	4.76	−5.40	0	−2
Independent Ecijans (PSEI)	328	1.78	−1.39	0	±0
Blank ballots	142	0.77	−1.11		
Total	18,404			21	±0
Valid votes	18,404	99.16	+0.63		
Invalid votes	156	0.84	−0.63		
Votes cast / turnout	18,560	58.79	−0.78		
Abstentions	13,012	41.21	+0.78		
Registered voters	31,572				
Sources
Footnotes: ^{1} We Can results are compared to Écija Can totals in the 2015 election.; ^{2} Andalusia by Herself results are compared to Andalusian Party totals in the 2015 election.

=== El Ejido ===
Population: 84,710

← Summary of the 26 May 2019 City Council of El Ejido election results →
Parties and alliances	Popular vote			Seats	
Parties and alliances	Votes	%	±pp	Total	+/−
People's Party (PP)	8,422	32.56	−15.40	9	−5
Vox (Vox)	6,406	24.76	+24.34	7	+7
Spanish Socialist Workers' Party of Andalusia (PSOE–A)	4,882	18.87	−6.01	5	−2
Citizens–Party of the Citizenry (Cs)	3,594	13.89	+8.50	4	+3
United Left Andalusia–Equo–For the People (IU–Equo–PG)	1,179	4.56	−2.00	0	−2
Union, Progress and Democracy (UPyD)	538	2.08	−4.17	0	−1
We Can (Podemos)	483	1.87	New	0	±0
Let's Win El Ejido–Ecologists Yes We Can (Ganemos)	75	0.29	New	0	±0
Union of Independent Citizens (UCIN)	54	0.21	New	0	±0
Blank ballots	237	0.92	−1.11		
Total	25,870			25	±0
Valid votes	25,870	99.31	+0.24		
Invalid votes	179	0.69	−0.24		
Votes cast / turnout	26,049	55.65	+10.39		
Abstentions	20,759	44.35	−10.39		
Registered voters	46,808				

=== El Puerto de Santa María ===
Population: 88,364

← Summary of the 26 May 2019 City Council of El Puerto de Santa María election results →
Parties and alliances	Popular vote			Seats	
Parties and alliances	Votes	%	±pp	Total	+/−
People's Party (PP)	10,774	29.39	−2.32	9	±0
Spanish Socialist Workers' Party of Andalusia (PSOE–A)	9,939	27.11	+6.85	8	+2
Forward El Puerto: We Can–United Left (Adelante)^{1}	4,070	11.10	+0.70	3	±0
Citizens–Party of the Citizenry (Cs)	3,428	9.35	−0.13	2	±0
Vox (Vox)	2,740	7.48	New	2	+2
Portuese Union (UP)	2,199	6.00	New	1	+1
Let's Raise El Puerto (Levantemos)	1,742	4.75	−10.47	0	−4
Andalusia by Herself (AxSí)^{2}	1,379	3.76	−2.64	0	−1
Blank ballots	384	1.05	−0.61		
Total	36,655			25	±0
Valid votes	36,655	99.23	+0.01		
Invalid votes	285	0.77	−0.01		
Votes cast / turnout	36,940	53.64	+2.91		
Abstentions	31,923	46.36	−2.91		
Registered voters	68,863				
Sources
Footnotes: ^{1} Forward El Puerto: We Can–United Left results are compared to United Left/The Greens–Assembly for Andalusia totals in the 2015 election.; ^{2} Andalusia by Herself results are compared to Andalusian Party totals in the 2015 election.

=== Estepona ===
Population: 67,012

← Summary of the 26 May 2019 City Council of Estepona election results →
Parties and alliances	Popular vote			Seats	
Parties and alliances	Votes	%	±pp	Total	+/−
People's Party (PP)	17,083	69.04	+9.27	21	+4
Spanish Socialist Workers' Party of Andalusia (PSOE–A)	3,830	15.48	−7.31	4	−2
We Can (Podemos)	1,012	4.09	New	0	±0
United Left Andalusia (IU–Andalucía)	942	3.81	−2.25	0	−1
Citizens–Party of the Citizenry (Cs)	784	3.17	New	0	±0
Vox (Vox)	584	2.36	+1.38	0	±0
More Andalusia (Mas.A)	286	1.16	New	0	±0
Costa del Sol Can... Tic Tac (CSSPTT)	n/a	n/a	−6.82	0	−1
Blank ballots	221	0.89	−0.53		
Total	24,742			25	±0
Valid votes	24,742	99.09	+0.51		
Invalid votes	227	0.91	−0.51		
Votes cast / turnout	24,969	55.32	−0.33		
Abstentions	20,164	44.68	+0.33		
Registered voters	45,133				

=== Fuengirola ===
Population: 75,396

← Summary of the 26 May 2019 City Council of Fuengirola election results →
Parties and alliances	Popular vote			Seats	
Parties and alliances	Votes	%	±pp	Total	+/−
People's Party (PP)	12,464	51.12	+1.46	15	+1
Spanish Socialist Workers' Party of Andalusia (PSOE–A)	5,460	22.39	+2.29	6	+1
Citizens–Party of the Citizenry (Cs)	2,409	9.88	−0.08	2	±0
Vox (Vox)	1,399	5.74	New	1	+1
United Left Andalusia (IU–Andalucía)	1,342	5.50	−1.70	1	−1
We Can (Podemos)	941	3.86	New	0	±0
More Andalusia–Costa del Sol Can–We Can 15M (Mas.CSSP)	226	0.93	−7.73	0	−2
Blank ballots	140	0.57	−0.47		
Total	24,381			25	±0
Valid votes	24,381	99.36	+0.22		
Invalid votes	158	0.64	−0.22		
Votes cast / turnout	24,539	53.51	+1.40		
Abstentions	21,322	46.49	−1.40		
Registered voters	45,861				

=== Granada ===
Population: 232,208

← Summary of the 26 May 2019 City Council of Granada election results →
Parties and alliances	Popular vote			Seats	
Parties and alliances	Votes	%	±pp	Total	+/−
Spanish Socialist Workers' Party of Andalusia (PSOE–A)	36,001	32.45	+6.59	10	+2
People's Party (PP)	26,351	23.75	−11.89	7	−4
Citizens–Party of the Citizenry (Cs)	16,448	14.83	+0.78	4	±0
Forward Granada: We Can–United Left (Adelante)^{1}	11,045	9.96	+4.11	3	+2
Vox (Vox)	10,552	9.51	+8.60	3	+3
Focused on Granada (CEG)	3,396	3.06	New	0	±0
Let's Go Granada (Vamos)	2,627	2.37	−10.41	0	−3
More Granada (+GR)	1,006	0.91	New	0	±0
Animalist Party Against Mistreatment of Animals (PACMA)	850	0.77	−0.08	0	±0
Equo (Equo)	504	0.45	New	0	±0
Federation Free Socialist Party (PSLF)	370	0.33	New	0	±0
For a Fairer World (PUM+J)	214	0.19	−0.13	0	±0
People's Welfare Party (PBG)	212	0.19	New	0	±0
Retirees Party for the Future. Dignity and Democracy (JUFUDI)	159	0.14	New	0	±0
Communist Party of the Andalusian People (PCPA)	159	0.14	+0.04	0	±0
Andalusian Nation (NA)	151	0.14	+0.07	0	±0
Spanish Liberal Project (PLIE)	77	0.07	New	0	±0
Granada Truth and Democracy (GRVD)	64	0.06	New	0	±0
Blank ballots	746	0.67	−0.35		
Total	110,932			27	±0
Valid votes	110,932	99.25	−0.04		
Invalid votes	835	0.75	+0.04		
Votes cast / turnout	111,767	60.89	+1.11		
Abstentions	71,776	39.11	−1.11		
Registered voters	183,543				
Sources
Footnotes: ^{1} Forward Granada: We Can–United Left results are compared to United Left–Socialist Alternative–For the People totals in the 2015 election.

=== Huelva ===
Population: 144,258

← Summary of the 26 May 2019 City Council of Huelva election results →
Parties and alliances	Popular vote			Seats	
Parties and alliances	Votes	%	±pp	Total	+/−
Spanish Socialist Workers' Party of Andalusia (PSOE–A)	25,969	45.16	+9.88	14	+3
People's Party (PP)	9,251	16.09	−10.60	4	−4
Citizens–Party of the Citizenry (Cs)	5,576	9.70	−0.41	3	±0
Forward Huelva: United Left–We Can (Adelante)^{1}	5,388	9.37	−5.95	2	−2
Huelva Estuary Board (MRH)	4,461	7.76	+1.38	2	+1
Vox (Vox)	3,938	6.85	+5.03	2	+2
Independents for Huelva (IxH)	1,313	2.28	New	0	±0
I Believe in Huelva (CeH)	978	1.70	New	0	±0
Andalusia by Herself (AxSí)^{2}	202	0.35	−1.40	0	±0
Blank ballots	426	0.74	−0.50		
Total	57,502			27	±0
Valid votes	57,502	99.32	+0.13		
Invalid votes	395	0.68	−0.13		
Votes cast / turnout	57,897	51.17	−0.92		
Abstentions	55,253	48.83	+0.92		
Registered voters	113,150				
Sources
Footnotes: ^{1} Forward Huelva: United Left–We Can results are compared to the combined totals of United Left/The Greens–Assembly for Andalusia and Participate Huelva in the 2015 election.; ^{2} Andalusia by Herself results are compared to Andalusian Party totals in the 2015 election.

=== Jaén ===
Population: 113,457

← Summary of the 26 May 2019 City Council of Jaén election results →
Parties and alliances	Popular vote			Seats	
Parties and alliances	Votes	%	±pp	Total	+/−
Spanish Socialist Workers' Party of Andalusia (PSOE–A)	19,953	37.01	+7.51	11	+2
People's Party (PP)	14,578	27.04	−11.32	8	−4
Citizens–Party of the Citizenry (Cs)	8,323	15.44	+4.11	4	+1
Forward Jaén: We Can–United Left (Adelante)^{1}	3,404	6.31	+2.23	2	+2
Vox (Vox)	3,374	6.26	+5.49	2	+2
Jaén, Sense and Common (JSyC)^{2}	2,013	3.73	−6.61	0	−3
Respect (Respeto)	632	1.17	New	0	±0
Jaén is Going to Grow (JVAC)	359	0.67	New	0	±0
Free (Libres)	316	0.59	New	0	±0
Federation Free Socialist Party (PSLF)	190	0.35	New	0	±0
Spanish Liberal Project (PLIE)	107	0.20	New	0	±0
Union of Independent Citizens (UCIN)	74	0.14	New	0	±0
With You, We Are Democracy (Contigo)	46	0.09	New	0	±0
Blank ballots	548	1.02	−0.57		
Total	53,917			27	±0
Valid votes	53,917	99.23	+0.31		
Invalid votes	420	0.77	−0.31		
Votes cast / turnout	54,337	59.88	−1.01		
Abstentions	36,402	40.12	+1.01		
Registered voters	90,739				
Sources
Footnotes: ^{1} Forward Jaén: We Can–United Left results are compared to United Left/The Greens–Assembly for Andalusia totals in the 2015 election.; ^{2} Jaén, Sense and Common results are compared to Jaén in Common totals in the 2015 election.

=== Jerez de la Frontera ===
Population: 212,879

← Summary of the 26 May 2019 City Council of Jerez de la Frontera election results →
Parties and alliances	Popular vote			Seats	
Parties and alliances	Votes	%	±pp	Total	+/−
Spanish Socialist Workers' Party of Andalusia (PSOE–A)	27,735	32.05	+7.85	10	+3
People's Party (PP)	24,476	28.28	−5.84	9	−2
Citizens–Party of the Citizenry (Cs)	11,813	13.65	+4.78	4	+2
Forward Jerez–We Can–United Left–Andalusian Spring (Adelante)^{1}	9,648	11.15	+3.84	3	+1
Let's Win Jerez (GJ)	4,540	5.25	−10.98	1	−4
Vox (Vox)	4,169	4.82	New	0	±0
Jerezan People in Action (Jerezanos)	2,497	2.89	New	0	±0
Andalusia by Herself (AxSí)^{2}	700	0.81	−1.40	0	±0
Communist Party of the Andalusian People (PCPA)	187	0.22	−0.03	0	±0
Blank ballots	783	0.90	−0.65		
Total	86,548			27	±0
Valid votes	86,548	99.30	+0.02		
Invalid votes	608	0.70	−0.02		
Votes cast / turnout	87,156	52.24	−2.51		
Abstentions	79,669	47.76	+2.51		
Registered voters	166,825				
Sources
Footnotes: ^{1} Forward Jerez–We Can–United Left–Andalusian Spring results are compared to United Left/The Greens–Assembly for Andalusia totals in the 2015 election.; ^{2} Andalusia by Herself results are compared to Andalusian Party totals in the 2015 election.

=== La Línea de la Concepción ===
Population: 62,940

← Summary of the 26 May 2019 City Council of La Línea de la Concepción election results →
Parties and alliances	Popular vote			Seats	
Parties and alliances	Votes	%	±pp	Total	+/−
La Línea 100x100 (LL100x100)	15,823	68.31	+37.35	21	+12
Spanish Socialist Workers' Party of Andalusia (PSOE–A)	2,771	11.96	−22.19	3	−6
People's Party (PP)	1,431	6.18	−14.24	1	−4
Forward La Línea (Adelante)^{1}	993	4.29	−2.13	0	−1
Vox (Vox)	741	3.20	New	0	±0
Between All Andalusia by Herself (ENTRA)^{2}	643	2.78	−2.45	0	−1
Citizens–Party of the Citizenry (Cs)	611	2.64	New	0	±0
Liberal Independent Group of Andalusia (GIL–A)	56	0.24	New	0	±0
Blank ballots	95	0.41	−0.75		
Total	23,164			25	±0
Valid votes	23,164	99.63	+0.46		
Invalid votes	87	0.37	−0.46		
Votes cast / turnout	23,251	47.33	+1.96		
Abstentions	25,870	52.67	−1.96		
Registered voters	49,121				
Sources
Footnotes: ^{1} Forward La Línea results are compared to United Left/The Greens–Assembly for Andalusia totals in the 2015 election.; ^{2} Between All Andalusia by Herself results are compared to Andalusian Party totals in the 2015 election.

=== Linares ===
Population: 57,811

← Summary of the 26 May 2019 City Council of Linares election results →
Parties and alliances	Popular vote			Seats	
Parties and alliances	Votes	%	±pp	Total	+/−
Spanish Socialist Workers' Party of Andalusia (PSOE–A)	6,854	25.33	−10.77	8	−2
People's Party (PP)	4,924	18.20	−10.31	5	−3
Citizens–Party of the Citizenry (Cs)	4,885	18.05	+8.62	5	+3
United Linares Independent Citizens (CILU–Linares)	3,179	11.75	New	3	+3
Linares First (Linares Primero)	2,505	9.26	New	2	+2
United Left Andalusia (IU–Andalucía)	1,813	6.70	−7.86	2	−2
Vox (Vox)	1,240	4.58	+3.83	0	±0
We Can (Podemos)	1,007	3.72	New	0	±0
Union of Independent Citizens (UCIN)	461	1.70	New	0	±0
United Free Citizens (CILUS)	n/a	n/a	−5.89	0	−1
Blank ballots	193	0.71	−1.12		
Total	27,061			25	±0
Valid votes	27,061	99.12	+0.76		
Invalid votes	239	0.88	−0.76		
Votes cast / turnout	27,300	58.84	+4.03		
Abstentions	19,099	41.16	−4.03		
Registered voters	46,399				

=== Málaga ===
Population: 571,026

← Summary of the 26 May 2019 City Council of Málaga election results →
Parties and alliances	Popular vote			Seats	
Parties and alliances	Votes	%	±pp	Total	+/−
People's Party (PP)	94,711	39.75	+3.15	14	+1
Spanish Socialist Workers' Party of Andalusia (PSOE–A)	77,509	32.53	+6.33	12	+3
Forward Málaga: United Left–We Can (Adelante)^{1}	25,201	10.58	+3.13	3	+1
Citizens–Party of the Citizenry (Cs)	18,555	7.79	−2.59	2	−1
Vox (Vox)	10,400	4.36	+4.01	0	±0
Málaga Now (Málaga Ahora)	4,398	1.85	−11.46	0	−4
Animalist Party Against Mistreatment of Animals (PACMA)	3,197	1.34	−0.14	0	±0
Let's Win Málaga–Ecologists Yes We Can (Ganemos)	656	0.28	New	0	±0
We Can Change Málaga (And–Ágora)	641	0.27	New	0	±0
Free (Libres)	577	0.24	New	0	±0
Communist Party of the Andalusian People (PCPA)	245	0.10	−0.13	0	±0
Libertarian Party (P–LIB)	196	0.08	New	0	±0
Communist Party of the Workers of Spain (PCTE)	185	0.08	New	0	±0
Internationalist Solidarity and Self-Management (SAIn)	141	0.06	−0.01	0	±0
Spanish Phalanx of the CNSO (FE de las JONS)	90	0.04	New	0	±0
Blank ballots	1,590	0.67	−0.36		
Total	238,292			31	±0
Valid votes	238,292	99.39	−0.04		
Invalid votes	1,462	0.61	+0.04		
Votes cast / turnout	239,754	55.45	+1.08		
Abstentions	192,657	44.55	−1.08		
Registered voters	432,411				
Sources
Footnotes: ^{1} Forward Málaga: United Left–We Can results are compared to United Left/The Greens–Assembly–Alternative totals in the 2015 election.

=== Marbella ===
Population: 141,463

← Summary of the 26 May 2019 City Council of Marbella election results →
Parties and alliances	Popular vote			Seats	
Parties and alliances	Votes	%	±pp	Total	+/−
People's Party (PP)	19,080	40.25	−0.76	14	+1
Spanish Socialist Workers' Party of Andalusia (PSOE–A)	14,842	31.31	+5.01	10	+2
San Pedro Option (OSP)	3,235	6.82	−2.34	2	±0
Citizens–Party of the Citizenry (Cs)	2,597	5.48	New	1	+1
United Left Andalusia (IU–Andalucía)	2,046	4.32	−2.45	0	−2
Vox (Vox)	1,568	3.31	New	0	±0
City Boost (IC)	1,543	3.26	New	0	±0
We Can (Podemos)^{1}	1,250	2.64	−5.56	0	−2
Union of Independent Citizens (UCIN)	862	1.82	New	0	±0
Party of the South (PASUR)	99	0.21	−0.08	0	±0
Blank ballots	280	0.59	−0.75		
Total	47,402			27	±0
Valid votes	47,402	99.19	+0.18		
Invalid votes	385	0.81	−0.18		
Votes cast / turnout	47,787	52.56	−1.08		
Abstentions	43,134	47.44	+1.08		
Registered voters	90,921				
Sources
Footnotes: ^{1} We Can results are compared to Costa del Sol Can... Tic Tac totals in the 2015 election.

=== Mijas ===
Population: 80,630

← Summary of the 26 May 2019 City Council of Mijas election results →
Parties and alliances	Popular vote			Seats	
Parties and alliances	Votes	%	±pp	Total	+/−
People's Party (PP)	7,322	30.41	−5.97	9	−2
Spanish Socialist Workers' Party of Andalusia (PSOE–A)	6,610	27.45	+1.25	8	+1
Citizens–Party of the Citizenry (Cs)	5,120	21.26	+4.13	6	+1
We Can (Podemos)	1,415	5.88	New	1	+1
Vox (Vox)	1,339	5.56	New	1	+1
Mijas Neighbourhood Movement (MVM)	1,178	4.89	New	0	±0
United Left Andalusia (IU–Andalucía)	581	2.41	−1.31	0	±0
More Andalusia–Costa del Sol Can–We Can 15M (Mas.CSSP)	311	1.29	−5.97	0	−2
Blank ballots	205	0.85	−0.19		
Total	24,081			25	±0
Valid votes	24,081	98.99	−0.34		
Invalid votes	246	1.01	+0.34		
Votes cast / turnout	24,327	52.55	−1.99		
Abstentions	21,968	47.45	+1.99		
Registered voters	46,295				

=== Morón de la Frontera ===
Population: 27,844

← Summary of the 26 May 2019 City Council of Morón de la Frontera election results →
Parties and alliances	Popular vote			Seats	
Parties and alliances	Votes	%	±pp	Total	+/−
Spanish Socialist Workers' Party of Andalusia (PSOE–A)	5,810	48.78	−1.79	11	±0
Alternative Moroneran Assembly (AMA–Morón)	2,583	21.69	−1.16	5	±0
People's Party (PP)	1,876	15.75	+2.37	3	±0
Forward Morón: We Can–United Left (Adelante)^{1}	1,462	12.27	+0.96	2	±0
Blank ballots	180	1.51	−0.39		
Total	11,911			21	±0
Valid votes	11,911	98.36	−0.03		
Invalid votes	198	1.64	+0.03		
Votes cast / turnout	12,109	53.67	−0.73		
Abstentions	10,453	46.33	+0.73		
Registered voters	22,562				
Sources
Footnotes: ^{1} Forward Morón: We Can–United Left results are compared to United Left/The Greens–Assembly for Andalusia totals in the 2015 election.

=== Motril ===
Population: 58,078

← Summary of the 26 May 2019 City Council of Motril election results →
Parties and alliances	Popular vote			Seats	
Parties and alliances	Votes	%	±pp	Total	+/−
People's Party (PP)	6,837	27.86	−3.95	8	−2
Spanish Socialist Workers' Party of Andalusia (PSOE–A)	5,348	21.79	−0.99	6	−1
More Tropical Coast (PMAS)	2,732	11.13	New	3	+3
Andalusia by Herself (AxSí)^{1}	2,348	9.57	−6.86	3	−2
Citizens–Party of the Citizenry (Cs)	1,868	7.61	+2.62	2	+2
United Left–Equo–For the People (IU–Equo–PG)^{2}	1,723	7.02	−7.17	2	−1
Vox (Vox)	1,538	6.27	New	1	+1
We Can (Podemos)	978	3.99	New	0	±0
#MotrilSPEAKS Citizen Platform (#MotrilDICE)	910	3.71	New	0	±0
Andalusian Nation (NA)	86	0.35	New	0	±0
Blank ballots	173	0.70	−0.73		
Total	24,541			25	±0
Valid votes	24,541	99.03	+0.12		
Invalid votes	241	0.97	−0.12		
Votes cast / turnout	24,782	57.82	+1.45		
Abstentions	18,080	42.18	−1.45		
Registered voters	42,862				
Sources
Footnotes: ^{1} Andalusia by Herself results are compared to Andalusian Party totals in the 2015 election.; ^{2} United Left–Equo–For the People results are compared to the combined totals of United Left/The Greens–Assembly for Andalusia and Equo in the 2015 election.

=== Ronda ===
Population: 33,978

← Summary of the 26 May 2019 City Council of Ronda election results →
Parties and alliances	Popular vote			Seats	
Parties and alliances	Votes	%	±pp	Total	+/−
People's Party (PP)	5,460	34.63	+5.13	9	+2
Spanish Socialist Workers' Party of Andalusia (PSOE–A)	4,196	26.61	+0.42	6	±0
Alliance for Ronda (APR)	1,992	12.63	−0.19	3	±0
United Left Andalusia (IU–Andalucía)	1,031	6.54	−2.73	1	−1
Citizens–Party of the Citizenry (Cs)	1,002	6.35	New	1	+1
With You, We Are Democracy (Contigo)	832	5.28	New	1	+1
Vox (Vox)	640	4.06	New	0	±0
We Can (Podemos)^{1}	432	2.74	−2.14	0	±0
Andalusian Party (PA)	n/a	n/a	−11.82	0	−3
Blank ballots	183	1.16	−0.86		
Total	15,768			21	±0
Valid votes	15,768	98.68	+0.37		
Invalid votes	211	1.32	−0.37		
Votes cast / turnout	15,979	58.05	+2.44		
Abstentions	11,547	41.95	−2.44		
Registered voters	27,526				
Sources
Footnotes: ^{1} We Can results are compared to Ronda Yes We Can totals in the 2015 election.

=== Roquetas de Mar ===
Population: 94,925

← Summary of the 26 May 2019 City Council of Roquetas de Mar election results →
Parties and alliances	Popular vote			Seats	
Parties and alliances	Votes	%	±pp	Total	+/−
People's Party (PP)	10,633	34.69	−6.25	11	−1
Spanish Socialist Workers' Party of Andalusia (PSOE–A)	6,456	21.06	−0.05	6	±0
Citizens–Party of the Citizenry (Cs)	3,696	12.06	−0.16	3	±0
Vox (Vox)	3,647	11.90	New	3	+3
United Left–Equo–You Decide–For the People (IU–Equo–Tú Decides–PG)^{1}	2,375	7.75	−10.84	2	−2
Aguadulce on the Move (AguaenMar)	1,023	3.34	New	0	±0
We Can (Podemos)	871	2.84	New	0	±0
Independents of Aguadulce and El Parador (INDAPA)	815	2.66	−1.94	0	±0
Independent Solutions for Roquetas de Mar (Roquetas Sí)	775	2.53	New	0	±0
WE ARE Citizen Action (SOMOS AC)	154	0.50	New	0	±0
Blank ballots	206	0.67	−0.93		
Total	30,651			25	±0
Valid votes	30,651	99.50	+0.48		
Invalid votes	154	0.50	−0.48		
Votes cast / turnout	30,805	54.69	+4.69		
Abstentions	25,519	45.31	−4.69		
Registered voters	56,324				
Sources
Footnotes: ^{1} United Left–Equo–You Decide–For the People results are compared to the combined totals of United Left Roquetas+Independents–For the People and You Decide in the 2015 election.

=== San Fernando ===
Population: 95,174

← Summary of the 26 May 2019 City Council of San Fernando election results →
Parties and alliances	Popular vote			Seats	
Parties and alliances	Votes	%	±pp	Total	+/−
Spanish Socialist Workers' Party of Andalusia (PSOE–A)	15,471	39.20	+9.44	11	+3
People's Party (PP)	7,145	18.10	−5.07	5	−2
Andalusia by Herself (AxSí)^{1}	4,341	11.00	−1.40	3	±0
Citizens–Party of the Citizenry (Cs)	3,978	10.08	−0.64	2	−1
Vox (Vox)	3,405	8.63	+7.51	2	+2
We Can (Podemos)^{2}	2,750	6.97	−7.46	2	−2
United Left Andalusia (IU–Andalucía)	1,322	3.35	−1.34	0	±0
Only San Fernando (SSF)	695	1.76	New	0	±0
Spanish Phalanx of the CNSO (FE de las JONS)	39	0.10	New	0	±0
Blank ballots	324	0.82	−0.56		
Total	39,470			25	±0
Valid votes	39,470	99.46	+0.21		
Invalid votes	214	0.54	−0.21		
Votes cast / turnout	39,684	51.95	−0.51		
Abstentions	36,699	48.05	+0.51		
Registered voters	76,383				
Sources
Footnotes: ^{1} Andalusia by Herself results are compared to Andalusian Party totals in the 2015 election.; ^{2} We Can results are compared to Yes We Can San Fernando totals in the 2015 election.

=== Sanlúcar de Barrameda ===
Population: 68,037

← Summary of the 26 May 2019 City Council of Sanlúcar de Barrameda election results →
Parties and alliances	Popular vote			Seats	
Parties and alliances	Votes	%	±pp	Total	+/−
Spanish Socialist Workers' Party of Andalusia (PSOE–A)	7,348	30.53	−1.48	9	±0
United Left Andalusia (IU–Andalucía)	4,873	20.24	+3.94	6	+2
Citizens–Party of the Citizenry (Cs)	4,516	18.76	+6.44	5	+2
People's Party (PP)	3,144	13.06	−11.60	3	−3
We Can (Podemos)^{1}	1,393	5.79	−7.37	1	−2
Vox (Vox)	1,378	5.72	New	1	+1
Free (Libres)	1,158	4.81	New	0	±0
Blank ballots	262	1.09	−0.70		
Total	24,072			25	±0
Valid votes	24,072	99.05	−0.01		
Invalid votes	231	0.95	+0.01		
Votes cast / turnout	24,303	44.45	+1.45		
Abstentions	30,370	55.55	−1.45		
Registered voters	54,673				
Sources
Footnotes: ^{1} We Can results are compared to For Sanlúcar Yes We Can totals in the 2015 election.

=== Seville ===
Population: 688,711

=== Torremolinos ===
Population: 68,262

← Summary of the 26 May 2019 City Council of Torremolinos election results →
Parties and alliances	Popular vote			Seats	
Parties and alliances	Votes	%	±pp	Total	+/−
People's Party (PP)	8,203	32.50	−3.48	9	−1
Spanish Socialist Workers' Party of Andalusia (PSOE–A)	7,606	30.14	+3.90	8	+1
Forward Torremolinos: We Can–United Left (Adelante)^{1}	2,844	11.27	+5.88	3	+2
Citizens–Party of the Citizenry (Cs)	2,477	9.81	−3.31	2	−2
Vox (Vox)	1,850	7.33	New	2	+2
For my Town (Por mi Pueblo)	1,493	5.92	New	1	+1
Citizens of Torremolinos (CTSTorremolinos)	246	0.97	New	0	±0
Now Yes, Torremolinos (AST)	135	0.53	New	0	±0
More Andalusia–Costa del Sol Can–We Can 15M (Mas.CSSP)	121	0.48	−12.15	0	−3
Blank ballots	262	1.04	−0.37		
Total	25,237			25	±0
Valid votes	25,237	99.10	−0.33		
Invalid votes	228	0.90	+0.33		
Votes cast / turnout	25,465	55.33	+0.07		
Abstentions	20,555	44.67	−0.07		
Registered voters	46,020				
Sources
Footnotes: ^{1} Forward Torremolinos: We Can–United Left results are compared to United Left/The Greens–Assembly for Andalusia–For the People totals in the 2015 election.

=== Utrera ===
Population: 50,250

← Summary of the 26 May 2019 City Council of Utrera election results →
Parties and alliances	Popular vote			Seats	
Parties and alliances	Votes	%	±pp	Total	+/−
Spanish Socialist Workers' Party of Andalusia (PSOE–A)	10,373	44.85	+1.27	14	+2
Together for Utrera (JxU)^{1}	7,566	32.72	+0.91	10	+1
Citizens–Party of the Citizenry (Cs)	1,406	6.08	New	1	+1
People's Party (PP)	969	4.19	−3.11	0	−2
Vox (Vox)	781	3.38	New	0	±0
We Can (Podemos)	706	3.05	New	0	±0
Independent Utreran Citizen Formation (FCUI)	516	2.23	New	0	±0
United Left/The Greens–Assembly for Andalusia (IULV–CA)	426	1.84	−5.99	0	−2
Equo Greens Utrera (Equo)	194	0.84	New	0	±0
All Together–Affected by Forum Filatélico/Afinsa (PTU–AFF/A)	25	0.11	New	0	±0
Blank ballots	164	0.71	−0.85		
Total	23,126			25	±0
Valid votes	23,126	99.29	+0.23		
Invalid votes	165	0.71	−0.23		
Votes cast / turnout	23,291	58.09	+1.13		
Abstentions	16,807	41.91	−1.13		
Registered voters	40,098				
Sources
Footnotes: ^{1} Together for Utrera results are compared to Andalusian Party totals in the 2015 election.

=== Vélez-Málaga ===
Population: 80,817

← Summary of the 26 May 2019 City Council of Vélez-Málaga election results →
Parties and alliances	Popular vote			Seats	
Parties and alliances	Votes	%	±pp	Total	+/−
People's Party (PP)	10,289	28.90	−8.12	9	−1
Spanish Socialist Workers' Party of Andalusia (PSOE–A)	7,301	20.51	−6.86	7	−1
Pro-Torre del Mar Municipality Independent Group (GIPMTM)	7,240	20.33	+13.27	7	+5
Andalusia by Herself (AxSí)^{1}	2,351	6.60	−0.24	2	±0
We Can (Podemos)	1,698	4.77	New	0	±0
Citizens–Party of the Citizenry (Cs)	1,431	4.02	−1.62	0	−1
United Left Andalusia (IU–Andalucía)	1,380	3.88	−3.63	0	−2
Vox (Vox)	1,310	3.68	New	0	±0
For my Town (Por mi Pueblo)	1,231	3.46	New	0	±0
Democratic People (Gente Democrática)	660	1.85	New	0	±0
Citizens for their People (CPSP)	245	0.69	−0.32	0	±0
Alternative for Autonomous Local Entities (AELA)	168	0.47	New	0	±0
Blank ballots	301	0.85	−0.49		
Total	35,605			25	±0
Valid votes	35,605	99.19	+0.20		
Invalid votes	291	0.81	−0.20		
Votes cast / turnout	35,896	59.15	+0.04		
Abstentions	24,790	40.85	−0.04		
Registered voters	60,686				
Sources
Footnotes: ^{1} Andalusia by Herself results are compared to Andalusian Party totals in the 2015 election.
