= Guanyem =

Ganemos or Guanyem refers to a set of independent municipal initiatives in Spain seeking to create and improve mechanisms for more direct citizen participation in politics. The movement, like 15M, was initiated during the Spanish financial crisis amidst a growing perception of, and disdain for, corruption, privatization, a closed nature of primaries, and political stagnancy caused by the two-party system. Ganemos is used for Spanish-speaking communities and Guanyem for Catalan-speaking communities. In Galicia, similar lists were called Mareas ("tides").

== History ==
The movement began with Guanyem Barcelona (now Barcelona en Comú for legal reasons). This political platform was initiated primarily by activists previously involved with movements such as PAH and 15M. The group’s manifesto was published on 24 May 2014 and on 10 February 2015 it announced that it would be running in the May 2015 municipal elections with Ada Colau as its mayoral candidate. Barcelona en Comú became the minority government with 25% of the electorate.

Shortly after its birth, new municipal initiatives from around the country began contacting Guanyem Barcelona to ask for advice, support, and permission to adopt the name (or, in many cases, the Spanish equivalent: Ganemos). Guanyem Barcelona recognized that they have neither the ability nor desire to lead an institutional organization that is bigger than Barcelona itself, but agreed to recognize and share ideas with related initiatives that might independently spawn. With this in mind, they published their first “guide to setting up a Guanyem” in May 2015 and another more detailed “guide to building a citizen municipal platform” in March 2016 With this action, they provided some structure for the formation of a Ganemos/Guanyem movement, recommending that prospective groups “support the Guanyem Barcelona Manifesto and the text of our ‘Principles and Commitments’ (ES). Each platform should be rooted in its local networks and social context, share the aims and working methods of Guanyem and be led by citizens. Any person or political party that wants to be involved should accept these minimum conditions, and no Guanyem platform should be led by any political party.”

Today many Spanish cities have a local Ganemos/Guanyem platform.

Some local variations of Unidos Podemos took inspiration from these lists. Catalunya en Comú was founded by Podemos, ICV, EUiA and Barcelona en Comú. En Marea was named after the "mareas" lists and was replaced by Galicia en Común.

== Ideology ==
The basic ideology underlying Ganemos is the political system proposed by municipalism, which involves creating a directly democratic confederation through citizen assemblies in towns and neighborhoods.

To pursue this goal, almost all Ganemos groups maintain a citizen candidature. The difference from a regular Spanish political party is that anyone can run in the primary and anyone can vote. Members of political parties are also allowed to participate on the condition that they do so as individuals and not as coalitions, so as to attempt to put them on equal footing with the rest of the citizen participants. Ganemos movements claim that this is what differentiates Ganemos groups from “alphabet soup” political coalitions such as the United Left and, more recently, Unidos Podemos.

However, finding the balance between aspects of a political group and a movement is one of the foremost challenges that Ganemos units must continue to debate. A related grand question Ganemos groups must tackle is where exactly to aim between a representative and a pure democracy. For example, many municipalist activists claim that the ideal government involves representatives that keep things running if people choose not to participate, but that allow direct citizen law proposals and votes (without the representative as intermediary) when they decide they want to participate. These activists see Ganemos as not going far enough toward pure democracy.

As Murray Bookchin, the credited creator of the concept of municipalism, frames the argument for further purity:

“These adherents or opponents of libertarian municipalism, in effect, look at the civic structures that exist before their eyes now and essentially (all rhetoric to the contrary aside) take them as they exist. Libertarian municipalism, by contrast, is an effort to transform and democratize city governments, to root them in popular assemblies, to knit them together along confederal lines, to appropriate a regional economy along confederal and municipal lines.”

On the other hand, we consider Podemos: the left-leaning, “populist” Podemos party which also spawned from 15M and the fallout of the financial crisis, and to many is culpable of what Bookchin describes above. However, while many agree that Ganemos puts more emphasis than Podemos on being open and participatory, many Ganemos groups rely on the structural power of Podemos to maintain interest in leftist causes that allow victory and promotion of the Ganemos cause in local elections. Really, then, this is a question of whether and how much the end of a more purely democratic society justifies the means of exploiting current, less purely democratic institutions to get there.

A final central idea for Ganemos taken from municipalism is transferring to municipal ownership assets owned by higher levels of government or, more often, corporations (also called municipalization). For example, groups with privatized water seek to put it under city control to reduce the cost and to promote the idea that water is a human right rather than a commodity. There are also efforts to reduce high costs from monopolies and oligopolies by having the state sell the commodity for a lower price. This ideology of putting “privatized” commodities into public hands is also the rhetoric used to back another fundamental pillar of Ganemos from municipalism: having environmentally friendly cities.

== Local lists ==
- Guanyem Barcelona
- Compostela Aberta
- Marea Atlántica, A Coruña
- Costa del Sol Sí Puede
- Ara Eivissa, Ibiza
- Ahora Madrid
- Málaga Ahora
- Marea de Vigo
- Zaragoza en Común

== Regions ==
- Guanyem les Illes Balears
- Canaries Decides
- Ganar la Región de Murcia
- Ganemos Castilla–La Mancha
- Catalunya en Comú
- Guanyem Catalunya
- En Marea, Galicia
- Galicia en Común
