= Andalucía por Sí =

Andalusia by Itself Andalucía por Sí
- Leader: Modesto González
- Founded: 5 November 2016
- Preceded by: Andalusian Party
- Headquarters: El Puerto de Santa María
- Youth wing: Andalucista Youth
- Ideology: Andalusian nationalism Progressivism; Left-wing nationalism Federalism
- Political position: Left-wing
- European affiliation: European Free Alliance
- Congress of Deputies: 0 / 350
- Senate: 0 / 266
- European Parliament: 0 / 61
- Parliament of Andalusia: 0 / 109
- Mayors: 8 / 786
- Local seats: 104 / 9,067

Website
- andaluciaporsi.com

Andalucía por Sí (English: "Andalusia by Itself", A×Sí) is an Andalusian nationalist political party founded in 2016 as a successor to the former Andalusian Party. Its results in regional and general elections have been mostly residual, but it holds more than 100 local councilors and several mayorships.

After the dissolution of the Andalusian Party, Andalusianism lacked a strong party of reference. In February 2016 the platform "Andalucía × Sí" was created, and as a prelude to the party a manifesto called "28 de febrero" was signed by personalities such as Javier Aroca or José Chamizo. In November 2016, in a constituent congress with more than 400 attendees, many of them former activists of the AP. He defined himself as a federalist and left-wing activist, wanting to distance himself from the extinct AP and its errors. During the crisis of the coronavirus disease pandemic in 2020, he proposed, in the town halls where he had municipal representation, to fly the flags of the European Union at half-mast due to the lack of solidarity to help Spain.

== Program ==
In its political programme, it defends various issues, from the breaking down of the digital divide in the rural world, to the sustainable development of the economy, or a boost for R&D&I policy in Andalusia. It calls for a new agrarian reform in which the interests of productivity take precedence over those of large landowners. It redefines a new historical debt of the State with Andalusia that exceeds 9 billion euros. Likewise, A×Sí proposes a renegotiation with the Ministry of Defence for the lease of land used for military purposes. It also proposes a constitutional reform that recognises Andalusia as a historic nation and the Spanish Roma people in the Spanish Constitution as a community.
