= 2023 Spanish local elections in Andalusia =

This article presents the results breakdown of the local elections held in Andalusia on 28 May 2023. The following tables show detailed results in the autonomous community's most populous municipalities, sorted alphabetically.

== City control ==
The following table lists party control in the most populous municipalities, including provincial capitals (shown in bold). Gains for a party are displayed with the cell's background shaded in that party's colour.

Municipality	Population	Previous control	New control
Alcalá de Guadaíra	75,917	Spanish Socialist Workers' Party of Andalusia (PSOE–A)	Spanish Socialist Workers' Party of Andalusia (PSOE–A)
Algeciras	122,368	People's Party (PP)	People's Party (PP)
**Almería**	199,237	People's Party (PP)	People's Party (PP)
Benalmádena	73,160	Spanish Socialist Workers' Party of Andalusia (PSOE–A)	People's Party (PP)
**Cádiz**	113,066	Forward Cádiz Left (AI)	People's Party (PP)
Chiclana de la Frontera	87,493	Spanish Socialist Workers' Party of Andalusia (PSOE–A)	Spanish Socialist Workers' Party of Andalusia (PSOE–A)
**Córdoba**	319,515	People's Party (PP)	People's Party (PP)
Dos Hermanas	137,561	Spanish Socialist Workers' Party of Andalusia (PSOE–A)	Spanish Socialist Workers' Party of Andalusia (PSOE–A)
El Ejido	87,500	People's Party (PP)	People's Party (PP)
El Puerto de Santa María	89,435	People's Party (PP)	People's Party (PP)
Estepona	74,493	People's Party (PP)	People's Party (PP)
Fuengirola	83,226	People's Party (PP)	People's Party (PP)
**Granada**	228,682	Spanish Socialist Workers' Party of Andalusia (PSOE–A)	People's Party (PP)
**Huelva**	141,854	Spanish Socialist Workers' Party of Andalusia (PSOE–A)	People's Party (PP)
**Jaén**	111,669	Spanish Socialist Workers' Party of Andalusia (PSOE–A)	People's Party (PP) (PSOE–A in 2025)
Jerez de la Frontera	212,730	Spanish Socialist Workers' Party of Andalusia (PSOE–A)	People's Party (PP)
La Línea de la Concepción	63,271	La Línea 100x100 (LL100x100)	La Línea 100x100 (LL100x100)
**Málaga**	579,076	People's Party (PP)	People's Party (PP)
Marbella	150,725	People's Party (PP)	People's Party (PP)
Mijas	89,502	Spanish Socialist Workers' Party (PSOE)	Spanish Socialist Workers' Party (PSOE) (PP in 2023)
Roquetas de Mar	102,881	People's Party (PP)	People's Party (PP)
San Fernando	94,120	Spanish Socialist Workers' Party of Andalusia (PSOE–A)	Spanish Socialist Workers' Party of Andalusia (PSOE–A)
Sanlúcar de Barrameda	69,727	Spanish Socialist Workers' Party of Andalusia (PSOE–A)	United Left Andalusia (IU–Andalucía)
**Seville**	681,998	Spanish Socialist Workers' Party of Andalusia (PSOE–A)	People's Party (PP)
Torremolinos	68,819	People's Party (PP)	People's Party (PP)
Vélez-Málaga	83,899	Spanish Socialist Workers' Party of Andalusia (PSOE–A)	People's Party (PP)

== Municipalities ==
=== Alcalá de Guadaíra ===
Population: 75,917

← Summary of the 28 May 2023 City Council of Alcalá de Guadaíra election results →
Parties and alliances	Popular vote			Seats	
Parties and alliances	Votes	%	±pp	Total	+/−
Spanish Socialist Workers' Party of Andalusia (PSOE–A)	11,474	36.61	+2.13	11	+1
People's Party (PP)	6,467	20.63	+8.88	6	+3
Vox (Vox)	4,492	14.33	+4.11	4	+1
Alcalá Matters to Us (Alcalá nos Importa)	2,682	8.56	New	2	+2
Andalusia by Herself–Andalusian Union (UA)	2,079	6.63	−2.08	2	±0
Forward Andalusia (Adelante Andalucía)^{1}	1,515	4.83	n/a	0	±0
Citizens–Party of the Citizenry (CS)	1,052	3.36	−8.05	0	−3
With Andalusia (Podemos–IdPA–LVA–AV)^{1}	998	3.18	n/a	0	−4
Blank ballots	582	1.86	+0.79		
Total	31,341			25	±0
Valid votes	31,341	97.65	−1.15		
Invalid votes	754	2.35	+1.15		
Votes cast / turnout	32,095	53.86	+0.39		
Abstentions	27,499	46.14	−0.39		
Registered voters	59,594				
Sources
Footnotes: ^{1} Within the Forward Alcalá: We Can–United Left–Andalusian Spring alliance in the 2019 election.

=== Algeciras ===
Population: 122,368

← Summary of the 28 May 2023 City Council of Algeciras election results →
Parties and alliances	Popular vote			Seats	
Parties and alliances	Votes	%	±pp	Total	+/−
People's Party (PP)	22,930	53.12	+11.86	16	+3
Spanish Socialist Workers' Party of Andalusia (PSOE–A)	9,567	22.16	−4.41	7	−1
Vox (Vox)	5,734	13.28	+5.03	4	+2
United Left–More Country–Greens Equo–People's Initiative (Para la Gente)^{1}	2,066	4.79	n/a	0	−1
Forward Andalusia (Adelante Andalucía)^{1}	1,418	3.28	n/a	0	±0
We Can (Podemos)^{1}	485	1.12	n/a	0	−1
Andalusi Party (Andalusí)	327	0.76	New	0	±0
Citizens–Party of the Citizenry (CS)	n/a	n/a	−7.97	0	−2
Blank ballots	640	1.48	+0.71		
Total	43,167			27	±0
Valid votes	43,167	98.82	−0.46		
Invalid votes	517	1.18	+0.46		
Votes cast / turnout	43,684	48.13	−0.94		
Abstentions	47,076	51.87	+0.94		
Registered voters	89,806				
Sources
Footnotes: ^{1} Within the Forward Algeciras alliance in the 2019 election.

=== Almería ===
Population: 199,237

← Summary of the 28 May 2023 City Council of Almería election results →
Parties and alliances	Popular vote			Seats	
Parties and alliances	Votes	%	±pp	Total	+/−
People's Party (PP)	37,481	48.64	+5.19	15	+2
Spanish Socialist Workers' Party of Andalusia (PSOE–A)	18,304	23.76	−6.31	7	−2
Vox (Vox)	10,130	13.15	+5.38	4	+2
With Andalusia: With Almería (Podemos–IU–VQ–AV)^{1}	3,996	5.19	−4.31	1	±0
Almería Moves Forward (Almería Avanza)	1,463	1.90	New	0	±0
Citizens–Party of the Citizenry (CS)	1,286	1.67	−6.00	0	−2
Sum Almería (Almería Suma +)	1,274	1.65	New	0	±0
People from Almería–Regionalists for Almería (ALM)	1,069	1.39	New	0	±0
Animalist Party with the Environment (PACMA)	870	1.13	New	0	±0
Blank Seats to Leave Empty Seats (EB)	253	0.33	+0.11	0	±0
Blank ballots	925	1.20	+0.38		
Total	77,051			27	±0
Valid votes	77,051	99.19	−0.24		
Invalid votes	626	0.81	+0.24		
Votes cast / turnout	77,677	53.50	−1.37		
Abstentions	67,518	46.50	+1.37		
Registered voters	145,195				
Sources
Footnotes: ^{1} With Andalusia: With Almería results are compared to the combined totals of We Can and United Left Andalusia–Equo–For the People in the 2019 election.

=== Benalmádena ===
Population: 73,160

← Summary of the 28 May 2023 City Council of Benalmádena election results →
Parties and alliances	Popular vote			Seats	
Parties and alliances	Votes	%	±pp	Total	+/−
People's Party (PP)	10,552	43.67	+21.62	13	+6
Spanish Socialist Workers' Party of Andalusia (PSOE–A)	7,875	32.59	−4.86	9	−2
Vox (Vox)	2,019	8.36	+2.05	2	±0
With Andalusia: With Benalmádena (IU–Podemos)^{1}	1,494	6.18	−6.52	1	−1
We Are Benalmádena (SBM)	757	3.13	+0.08	0	±0
Animalist Party with the Environment (PACMA)	640	2.65	New	0	±0
For my Town (Por mi Pueblo)	352	1.46	−3.43	0	±0
With You, We Are Democracy (Contigo)	168	0.70	−0.86	0	±0
Citizens–Party of the Citizenry (CS)	n/a	n/a	−10.97	3	−3
Blank ballots	304	1.26	+0.67		
Total	24,161			25	±0
Valid votes	24,161	99.01	−0.33		
Invalid votes	241	0.99	+0.33		
Votes cast / turnout	24,402	52.56	−0.87		
Abstentions	22,021	47.44	+0.87		
Registered voters	46,423				
Sources
Footnotes: ^{1} With Andalusia: With Benalmádena results are compared to the combined totals of United Left Andalusia and We Can in the 2019 election.

=== Cádiz ===
Population: 113,066

← Summary of the 28 May 2023 City Council of Cádiz election results →
Parties and alliances	Popular vote			Seats	
Parties and alliances	Votes	%	±pp	Total	+/−
People's Party (PP)	23,198	40.11	+18.07	14	+8
Spanish Socialist Workers' Party of Andalusia (PSOE–A)	11,558	19.98	+2.75	7	+2
Forward Cádiz Left (AI)^{1}	11,320	19.57	n/a	6	+3
Vox (Vox)	2,678	4.63	+0.86	0	±0
Now Cádiz (AhoraCádiz)	2,169	3.75	New	0	±0
Social Justice (Justicia Social)	1,442	2.49	New	0	±0
Cádiz Yes–Andalusian Union (UA)	1,349	2.33	New	0	±0
Animalist Party with the Environment (PACMA)^{2}	1,045	1.81	+0.59	0	±0
Citizens–Party of the Citizenry (CS)	1,001	1.73	−9.22	0	−3
We Can (Podemos)^{1}	999	1.73	n/a	0	−10
Blank Seats to Leave Empty Seats (EB)	219	0.38	New	0	±0
Blank ballots	862	1.49	+0.81		
Total	57,840			27	±0
Valid votes	57,840	98.76	−0.57		
Invalid votes	724	1.24	+0.57		
Votes cast / turnout	58,564	61.69	−0.95		
Abstentions	36,374	38.31	+0.95		
Registered voters	94,938				
Sources
Footnotes: ^{1} Within the Forward Cádiz: We Can–Winning Cádiz in Common–United Left alliance in the 2019 election.; ^{2} Animalist Party with the Environment results are compared to Animalist Party Against Mistreatment of Animals totals in the 2019 election.

=== Chiclana de la Frontera ===
Population: 87,493

← Summary of the 28 May 2023 City Council of Chiclana de la Frontera election results →
Parties and alliances	Popular vote			Seats	
Parties and alliances	Votes	%	±pp	Total	+/−
Spanish Socialist Workers' Party of Andalusia (PSOE–A)	12,859	39.52	+6.33	11	+2
People's Party (PP)	9,998	30.73	+9.02	9	+3
Vox (Vox)	3,470	10.67	+4.07	3	+2
United Left Andalusia (IU–Andalucía)	2,469	7.59	+0.02	2	±0
We Can (Podemos)	1,020	3.14	−5.29	0	−2
Let's Win Chiclana–Andalusian Union (UA)	881	2.71	−4.13	0	−2
Citizens–Party of the Citizenry (CS)	704	2.16	−11.45	0	−3
Forward Andalusia (Adelante Andalucía)	552	1.70	New	0	±0
Blank ballots	582	1.79	+0.50		
Total	32,535			25	±0
Valid votes	32,535	98.88	−0.38		
Invalid votes	368	1.12	+0.38		
Votes cast / turnout	32,903	48.00	+1.36		
Abstentions	35,650	52.00	−1.36		
Registered voters	68,553				
Sources
Footnotes: ^{1} We Can results are compared to For Chiclana Yes We Can totals in the 2015 election.

=== Córdoba ===
Population: 319,515

← Summary of the 28 May 2023 City Council of Córdoba election results →
Parties and alliances	Popular vote			Seats	
Parties and alliances	Votes	%	±pp	Total	+/−
People's Party (PP)	69,681	46.27	+16.44	15	+6
Spanish Socialist Workers' Party of Andalusia (PSOE–A)	32,891	21.84	−5.11	7	−1
With Andalusia: We Build Córdoba (IU–Podemos–VQ–AV–MPA–IdPA)^{1}	19,561	12.99	−3.85	4	−1
Vox (Vox)	17,987	11.94	+3.97	3	+1
Citizens–Party of the Citizenry (CS)	2,198	1.46	−13.72	0	−5
Animalist Party with the Environment (PACMA)^{2}	1,985	1.32	+0.22	0	±0
Forward Andalusia (Adelante Andalucía)	1,453	0.96	New	0	±0
Córdoba Grows (COC)	981	0.65	New	0	±0
Blank Seats to Leave Empty Seats (EB)	526	0.35	+0.21	0	±0
Andalusia Between All–Andalusian Union (UA)	367	0.24	New	0	±0
Free (Libres)	256	0.17	New	0	±0
For a Fairer World (PUM+J)	254	0.17	+0.06	0	±0
Andalusian Nation (NA)	161	0.11	New	0	±0
Blank ballots	2,305	1.53	+0.75		
Total	150,606			29	±0
Valid votes	150,606	98.75	−0.64		
Invalid votes	1,902	1.25	+0.64		
Votes cast / turnout	152,508	58.26	+1.83		
Abstentions	109,241	41.74	−1.83		
Registered voters	261,749				
Sources
Footnotes: ^{1} With Andalusia: We Build Córdoba results are compared to the combined totals of United Left Andalusia and We Can in the 2019 election.; ^{2} Animalist Party with the Environment results are compared to Animalist Party Against Mistreatment of Animals totals in the 2019 election.

=== Dos Hermanas ===
Population: 137,561

← Summary of the 28 May 2023 City Council of Dos Hermanas election results →
Parties and alliances	Popular vote			Seats	
Parties and alliances	Votes	%	±pp	Total	+/−
Spanish Socialist Workers' Party of Andalusia (PSOE–A)	28,303	50.67	+0.23	16	±0
People's Party (PP)	12,204	21.85	+13.25	6	+4
Vox (Vox)	6,333	11.34	+3.07	3	+1
With Andalusia (Podemos–IU–MPA–IdPA–VQ–AV)^{1}	3,983	7.13	n/a	2	−1
Forward Andalusia (Adelante Andalucía)^{1}	2,481	4.44	n/a	0	−1
Citizens–Party of the Citizenry (CS)	1,538	2.75	−8.47	0	−3
Communist Party of the Andalusian People (PCPA)	214	0.38	New	0	±0
Blank ballots	807	1.44	0.51		
Total	55,863			27	±0
Valid votes	55,863	98.74	−0.52		
Invalid votes	714	1.26	+0.52		
Votes cast / turnout	56,577	52.42	−0.56		
Abstentions	51,363	47.58	+0.56		
Registered voters	107,940				
Sources
Footnotes: ^{1} Within the Forward Dos Hermanas: We Can–United Left–Andalusian Spring alliance in the 2019 election.

=== El Ejido ===
Population: 87,500

← Summary of the 28 May 2023 City Council of El Ejido election results →
Parties and alliances	Popular vote			Seats	
Parties and alliances	Votes	%	±pp	Total	+/−
People's Party (PP)	11,678	47.21	+14.65	14	+5
Vox (Vox)	5,496	22.22	−2.54	6	−1
Spanish Socialist Workers' Party of Andalusia (PSOE–A)	4,033	16.31	−2.56	5	±0
People from Almería–Regionalists for Almería (ALM)	965	3.90	New	0	±0
With Andalusia: With El Ejido (IU–Podemos)^{1}	744	3.01	−3.42	0	±0
Neighbours of El Ejido (VdeElEjido)	675	2.73	New	0	±0
Citizens–Party of the Citizenry (CS)	563	2.28	−11.61	0	−4
Almería Moves Forward (Almería Avanza)	264	1.07	New	0	±0
Blank ballots	316	1.28	+0.36		
Total	24,734			25	±0
Valid votes	24,734	98.99	−0.32		
Invalid votes	252	1.01	+0.32		
Votes cast / turnout	24,986	52.11	−3.54		
Abstentions	22,959	47.89	+3.54		
Registered voters	47,945				
Sources
Footnotes: ^{1} With Andalusia: With El Ejido results are compared to the combined totals of United Left Andalusia–Equo–For the People and We Can in the 2019 election.

=== El Puerto de Santa María ===
Population: 89,435

← Summary of the 28 May 2023 City Council of El Puerto de Santa María election results →
Parties and alliances	Popular vote			Seats	
Parties and alliances	Votes	%	±pp	Total	+/−
People's Party (PP)	18,091	46.55	+17.16	14	+5
Spanish Socialist Workers' Party of Andalusia (PSOE–A)	7,226	18.59	−8.52	5	−3
Vox (Vox)	4,045	10.41	+2.93	3	+1
Portuese Union (UP)	3,755	9.66	+3.66	2	+1
United Left Andalusia (IU–Andalucía)^{1}	2,262	5.82	n/a	1	−1
Forward Andalusia (Adelante Andalucía)^{1}	935	2.41	n/a	0	−1
El Puerto 100x100 (EP100x100)	699	1.80	New	0	±0
We Can (Podemos)^{1}	610	1.57	n/a	0	±0
Citizens–Party of the Citizenry (CS)	518	1.33	−8.02	0	−2
El Puerto Yes–Andalusian Union (UA)^{2}	220	0.57	−3.19	0	±0
Blank ballots	503	1.29	+0.24		
Total	38,864			25	±0
Valid votes	38,864	99.16	−0.07		
Invalid votes	328	0.84	+0.07		
Votes cast / turnout	39,192	55.33	+1.69		
Abstentions	31,644	44.67	−1.69		
Registered voters	70,836				
Sources
Footnotes: ^{1} Within the Forward El Puerto: We Can–United Left alliance in the 2019 election.; ^{2} El Puerto Yes–Andalusian Union results are compared to Andalusia by Herself totals in the 2019 election.

=== Estepona ===
Population: 74,493

← Summary of the 28 May 2023 City Council of Estepona election results →
Parties and alliances	Popular vote			Seats	
Parties and alliances	Votes	%	±pp	Total	+/−
People's Party (PP)	14,706	60.77	−8.27	17	−4
Spanish Socialist Workers' Party of Andalusia (PSOE–A)	4,754	19.65	+4.17	5	+1
Vox (Vox)	3,252	13.44	+11.08	3	+3
With Andalusia: With Estepona (Podemos–IU)^{1}	1,134	4.69	−3.21	0	±0
Blank ballots	353	1.46	+0.57		
Total	24,199			25	±0
Valid votes	24,199	98.54	−0.55		
Invalid votes	358	1.46	+0.55		
Votes cast / turnout	24,557	51.86	−3.46		
Abstentions	22,798	48.14	+3.46		
Registered voters	47,355				
Sources
Footnotes: ^{1} With Andalusia: With Estepona results are compared to the combined totals of We Can and United Left Andalusia in the 2019 election.

=== Fuengirola ===
Population: 83,226

← Summary of the 28 May 2023 City Council of Fuengirola election results →
Parties and alliances	Popular vote			Seats	
Parties and alliances	Votes	%	±pp	Total	+/−
People's Party (PP)	13,332	55.68	+4.56	15	±0
Spanish Socialist Workers' Party of Andalusia (PSOE–A)	4,898	20.45	−1.94	5	−1
Vox (Vox)	2,656	11.09	+5.35	3	+2
With Andalusia: We Build Fuengirola (IU–Podemos–VQ–MPA–IdPA–AV)^{1}	1,845	7.70	−1.66	2	+1
Citizens–Party of the Citizenry (CS)	979	4.09	−5.79	0	−2
Blank ballots	236	0.99	+0.42		
Total	23,946			25	±0
Valid votes	23,946	99.26	−0.10		
Invalid votes	178	0.74	+0.10		
Votes cast / turnout	24,124	52.64	−0.87		
Abstentions	21,706	47.36	+0.87		
Registered voters	45,830				
Sources
Footnotes: ^{1} With Andalusia: We Build Fuengirola results are compared to the combined totals of United Left Andalusia and We Can in the 2019 election.

=== Granada ===
Population: 228,682

← Summary of the 28 May 2023 City Council of Granada election results →
Parties and alliances	Popular vote			Seats	
Parties and alliances	Votes	%	±pp	Total	+/−
People's Party (PP)	48,734	45.29	+21.54	15	+8
Spanish Socialist Workers' Party of Andalusia (PSOE–A)	35,643	33.12	+0.67	10	±0
Vox (Vox)	9,085	8.44	−1.07	2	−1
United Granada for the People (Para la Gente)^{1}	4,927	4.58	n/a	0	−1
We Can–Green Alliance (Podemos–AV)^{1}	3,180	2.96	n/a	0	−2
Together for Granada (JxG)	1,407	1.31	New	0	±0
Citizens–Party of the Citizenry (CS)	1,095	1.02	−13.81	0	−4
Forward Andalusia (Adelante Andalucía)^{1}	816	0.76	n/a	0	±0
For a Fairer World (PUM+J)	798	0.74	+0.55	0	±0
Left in Positive (IZQP)	539	0.50	New	0	±0
Blank Seats to Leave Empty Seats (EB)	294	0.27	New	0	±0
Andalusian Nation (NA)	115	0.11	−0.03	0	±0
Blank ballots	981	0.91	+0.24		
Total	107,614			27	±0
Valid votes	107,614	97.34	−1.91		
Invalid votes	2,942	2.66	+1.91		
Votes cast / turnout	110,556	61.63	+0.74		
Abstentions	68,826	38.37	−0.74		
Registered voters	179,382				
Sources
Footnotes: ^{1} Within the Forward Granada: We Can–United Left alliance in the 2019 election.; ^{2} Animalist Party with the Environment results are compared to Animalist Party Against Mistreatment of Animals totals in the 2019 election.

=== Huelva ===
Population: 141,854

← Summary of the 28 May 2023 City Council of Huelva election results →
Parties and alliances	Popular vote			Seats	
Parties and alliances	Votes	%	±pp	Total	+/−
People's Party (PP)	24,703	41.09	+25.00	13	+9
Spanish Socialist Workers' Party of Andalusia (PSOE–A)	20,043	33.34	−11.82	11	−3
Vox (Vox)	4,771	7.94	+1.09	2	±0
With Andalusia: Let Hope Return/Huelva (IU–Podemos–IdPA)^{1}	3,518	5.85	n/a	1	±0
Huelva Estuary Board (MRH)	2,182	3.63	−4.13	0	−2
For Huelva (XH)	1,784	2.97	New	0	±0
Citizens–Party of the Citizenry (CS)	1,373	2.28	−7.42	0	−3
Forward Andalusia (Adelante Andalucía)^{1}	746	1.24	n/a	0	−1
Andalusia by Herself–Andalusian Union (UA)	169	0.28	−0.07	0	±0
Social Awakening (DSO)	118	0.20	New	0	±0
Andalusian Nation (NA)	65	0.11	New	0	±0
Blank ballots	649	1.08	+0.34		
Total	60,121			27	±0
Valid votes	60,121	99.02	−0.30		
Invalid votes	595	0.98	+0.30		
Votes cast / turnout	60,716	54.41	+3.24		
Abstentions	50,867	45.59	−3.24		
Registered voters	111,583				
Sources
Footnotes: ^{1} Within the Forward Huelva: United Left–We Can alliance in the 2019 election.

=== Jaén ===
Population: 111,669

← Summary of the 28 May 2023 City Council of Jaén election results →
Parties and alliances	Popular vote			Seats	
Parties and alliances	Votes	%	±pp	Total	+/−
Spanish Socialist Workers' Party of Andalusia (PSOE–A)	20,731	36.78	−0.23	11	±0
People's Party (PP)	20,404	36.20	+9.16	11	+3
Jaén Deserves More (JM+)	7,068	12.54	New	3	+3
Vox (Vox)	4,858	8.62	+2.36	2	±0
United Left Andalusia–More Country–Greens Equo–Zero Cuts (Para la Gente)^{1}	978	1.74	n/a	0	±0
We Can–Jaén, Sense and Common (Podemos–JSyC)^{1}	930	1.65	n/a	0	−2
Animalist Party with the Environment (PACMA)	364	0.65	New	0	±0
Citizens–Party of the Citizenry (CS)	349	0.62	−14.82	0	−4
Building Nation (HN)	273	0.48	New	0	±0
Blank ballots	406	0.72	−0.30		
Total	56,361			27	±0
Valid votes	56,361	99.22	−0.01		
Invalid votes	444	0.78	+0.01		
Votes cast / turnout	56,805	63.13	+3.25		
Abstentions	33,172	36.87	−3.25		
Registered voters	89,977				
Sources
Footnotes: ^{1} Within the Forward Jaén: We Can–United Left alliance in the 2019 election.

=== Jerez de la Frontera ===
Population: 212,730

← Summary of the 28 May 2023 City Council of Jerez de la Frontera election results →
Parties and alliances	Popular vote			Seats	
Parties and alliances	Votes	%	±pp	Total	+/−
People's Party (PP)	40,416	42.78	+14.50	14	+5
Spanish Socialist Workers' Party of Andalusia (PSOE–A)	28,239	29.89	−2.16	9	−1
Vox (Vox)	8,060	8.53	+3.71	2	+2
United Left Andalusia+Let's Win Jerez: Confluence for the People (Para la Gente)^{1}	6,549	6.93	n/a	2	±0
Forward Andalusia (Adelante Andalucía)^{2}	2,884	3.05	n/a	0	−1
Citizens–Party of the Citizenry (CS)	2,197	2.33	−11.32	0	−4
Andalusia by Herself–Andalusian Union (UA)	1,771	1.87	+1.06	0	±0
We Can (Podemos)^{2}	1,445	1.53	n/a	0	−1
United for Guadalcacín (UPGU)	1,336	1.41	New	0	±0
Republican Alternative (ALTER)	219	0.23	New	0	±0
Blank ballots	1,368	1.45	+0.55		
Total	94,484			27	±0
Valid votes	94,484	98.88	−0.42		
Invalid votes	1,069	1.12	+0.42		
Votes cast / turnout	95,553	56.30	+4.06		
Abstentions	74,167	43.70	−4.06		
Registered voters	169,720				
Sources
Footnotes: ^{2} Within the Forward Jerez–We Can–United Left–Andalusian Spring alliance and Let's Win Jerez in the 2019 election.; ^{2} Within the Forward Jerez–We Can–United Left–Andalusian Spring alliance in the 2019 election.

=== La Línea de la Concepción ===
Population: 63,271

← Summary of the 28 May 2023 City Council of La Línea de la Concepción election results →
Parties and alliances	Popular vote			Seats	
Parties and alliances	Votes	%	±pp	Total	+/−
La Línea 100x100 (LL100x100)	17,238	75.18	+6.87	22	+1
Spanish Socialist Workers' Party of Andalusia (PSOE–A)	2,135	9.31	−2.65	2	−1
People's Party (PP)	1,244	5.43	−0.75	1	±0
Vox (Vox)	704	3.07	−0.13	0	±0
Another Línea is Possible (OLEP)	699	3.05	New	0	±0
United Left Andalusia (IU–Andalucía)^{1}	642	2.80	n/a	0	±0
We Can (Podemos)^{1}	159	0.69	n/a	0	±0
Blank ballots	107	0.47	+0.06		
Total	22,928			25	±0
Valid votes	22,928	99.45	−0.18		
Invalid votes	126	0.55	+0.18		
Votes cast / turnout	23,054	46.64	−0.69		
Abstentions	26,375	53.36	+0.69		
Registered voters	49,429				
Sources
Footnotes: ^{2} Within the Forward La Línea alliance in the 2019 election.

=== Málaga ===
Population: 579,076

← Summary of the 28 May 2023 City Council of Málaga election results →
Parties and alliances	Popular vote			Seats	
Parties and alliances	Votes	%	±pp	Total	+/−
People's Party (PP)	117,578	49.18	+9.43	17	+3
Spanish Socialist Workers' Party of Andalusia (PSOE–A)	69,832	29.21	−3.32	10	−2
Vox (Vox)	18,476	7.73	+3.37	2	+2
With Andalusia: With Málaga (IU–Podemos–MPA–VQ–IdPA)^{1}	17,655	7.38	n/a	2	−1
Citizens–Party of the Citizenry (CS)	4,712	1.97	−5.82	0	−2
Animalist Party with the Environment (PACMA)^{2}	3,498	1.46	+0.12	0	±0
Forward Andalusia (Adelante Andalucía)^{1}	2,648	1.11	n/a	0	±0
Blank Seats to Leave Empty Seats (EB)	771	0.32	New	0	±0
Communist Party of the Andalusian People (PCPA)	464	0.19	+0.09	0	±0
For a Fairer World (PUM+J)	426	0.18	New	0	±0
Republican Alternative (ALTER)	240	0.10	New	0	±0
Spanish Phalanx of the CNSO (FE de las JONS)	145	0.06	+0.02	0	±0
Blank ballots	2,634	1.10	+0.43		
Total	239,079			31	±0
Valid votes	239,079	99.09	−0.30		
Invalid votes	2,202	0.91	+0.30		
Votes cast / turnout	241,281	55.19	−0.26		
Abstentions	195,917	44.81	+0.26		
Registered voters	437,198				
Sources
Footnotes: ^{1} Within the Forward Málaga: United Left–We Can alliance in the 2019 election.; ^{2} Animalist Party with the Environment results are compared to Animalist Party Against Mistreatment of Animals totals in the 2019 election.

=== Marbella ===
Population: 150,725

← Summary of the 28 May 2023 City Council of Marbella election results →
Parties and alliances	Popular vote			Seats	
Parties and alliances	Votes	%	±pp	Total	+/−
People's Party (PP)	19,646	40.86	+0.61	14	±0
Spanish Socialist Workers' Party of Andalusia (PSOE–A)	12,473	25.94	−5.37	8	−2
San Pedro Option (OSP)	4,631	9.63	+2.81	3	+1
Vox (Vox)	4,050	8.42	+5.11	2	+2
Citizens–Party of the Citizenry (CS)	1,690	3.52	−1.96	0	−1
City Boost (IC)	1,651	3.43	+0.17	0	±0
With Andalusia: United (Podemos–IU–MPA–VQ–IdPA–AV)^{1}	1,579	3.28	−3.68	0	±0
For my Town (Por mi Pueblo)	1,346	2.80	New	0	±0
For Marbella and San Pedro (Por Marbella y San Pedro)	464	0.97	New	0	±0
Blank ballots	547	1.14	+0.55		
Total	48,077			27	±0
Valid votes	48,077	98.80	−0.39		
Invalid votes	586	1.20	+0.39		
Votes cast / turnout	48,663	52.00	−0.56		
Abstentions	44,928	48.00	+0.56		
Registered voters	93,591				
Sources
Footnotes: ^{1} With Andalusia: United results are compared to the combined totals of United Left Andalusia and We Can in the 2019 election.

=== Mijas ===
Population: 89,502

← Summary of the 28 May 2023 City Council of Mijas election results →
Parties and alliances	Popular vote			Seats	
Parties and alliances	Votes	%	±pp	Total	+/−
Spanish Socialist Workers' Party of Andalusia (PSOE–A)	8,589	33.62	+6.17	10	+2
People's Party (PP)	8,077	31.61	+1.20	9	±0
Vox (Vox)	2,929	11.46	+5.90	3	+2
Citizens–Party of the Citizenry (CS)	1,680	6.58	−14.68	2	−4
For my Town (Por mi Pueblo)	1,412	5.53	New	1	+1
With Andalusia: United with Mijas (Podemos–IdPA–MPA–IU)^{1}	859	3.36	−4.93	0	−1
Animalist Party with the Environment (PACMA)	503	1.97	New	0	±0
Mijenian Alternative (AMijas–AMiha)	485	1.90	New	0	±0
I am from Mijas (SoydeMijas)	434	1.70	New	0	±0
Forward Andalusia (Adelante Andalucía)	308	1.21	New	0	±0
Blank ballots	272	1.06	+0.21		
Total	25,548			25	±0
Valid votes	25,548	98.71	−0.28		
Invalid votes	334	1.29	+0.28		
Votes cast / turnout	25,882	51.80	−0.75		
Abstentions	24,085	48.20	+0.75		
Registered voters	49,967				
Sources
Footnotes: ^{1} With Andalusia: United with Mijas results are compared to the combined totals of We Can and United Left Andalusia in the 2019 election.

=== Roquetas de Mar ===
Population: 102,881

← Summary of the 28 May 2023 City Council of Roquetas de Mar election results →
Parties and alliances	Popular vote			Seats	
Parties and alliances	Votes	%	±pp	Total	+/−
People's Party (PP)	14,318	45.93	+11.24	15	+4
Spanish Socialist Workers' Party of Andalusia (PSOE–A)	4,932	15.82	−5.24	5	−1
Vox (Vox)	3,811	12.22	+0.32	4	+1
Almería Moves Forward (Almería Avanza)	2,372	7.61	New	2	+2
With Andalusia: With Roquetas de Mar (IU–Podemos)^{1}	1,677	5.38	−5.21	1	−1
Aguadulce on the Move–WE ARE Citizen Action (Unión por Aguadulce)^{2}	1,269	4.07	+0.23	0	±0
Independents of Aguadulce and El Parador (INDAPA)	1,121	3.60	+0.94	0	±0
Independent Solutions for Roquetas de Mar (Roquetas Sí)	374	1.20	−1.33	0	±0
Citizens–Party of the Citizenry (CS)	296	0.95	−11.11	0	−3
Together We Move Forward Spain (Avanzamos Juntos España)	284	0.91	New	0	±0
Almería Alive (Almería Viva)	222	0.71	New	0	±0
Civic Duty Roquetas (C&C DE)	99	0.32	New	0	±0
Free (Libres)	47	0.15	New	0	±0
Blank ballots	352	1.13	+0.46		
Total	31,174			27	+2
Valid votes	31,174	99.31	−0.19		
Invalid votes	218	0.69	+0.19		
Votes cast / turnout	31,392	50.72	−3.97		
Abstentions	30,504	49.28	+3.97		
Registered voters	61,896				
Sources
Footnotes: ^{1} With Andalusia: With Roquetas de Mar results are compared to the combined totals of United Left–Equo–You Decide–For the People and We Can in the 2019 election.; ^{2} Aguadulce on the Move–WE ARE Citizen Action results are compared to the combined totals of Aguadulce on the Move and WE ARE Citizen Action in the 2019 election.

=== San Fernando ===
Population: 94,120

← Summary of the 28 May 2023 City Council of San Fernando election results →
Parties and alliances	Popular vote			Seats	
Parties and alliances	Votes	%	±pp	Total	+/−
Spanish Socialist Workers' Party of Andalusia (PSOE–A)	18,263	46.03	+6.83	13	+2
People's Party (PP)	10,166	25.63	+7.53	7	+2
Vox (Vox)	4,715	11.88	+3.25	3	+1
Andalusia by Herself–Andalusian Union (UA)	2,750	6.93	−4.07	2	−1
United Left Andalusia (IU–Andalucía)	1,211	3.05	−0.30	0	±0
We Can (Podemos)	1,102	2.78	−4.19	0	−2
Citizens–Party of the Citizenry (CS)	364	0.92	−9.16	0	−2
3R Platform (3R)	273	0.69	New	0	±0
Constitutionalists (CNS)	270	0.68	New	0	±0
Blank ballots	558	1.41	+0.59		
Total	39,672			25	±0
Valid votes	39,672	99.04	−0.42		
Invalid votes	386	0.96	+0.42		
Votes cast / turnout	40,058	52.25	+0.30		
Abstentions	36,604	47.75	−0.30		
Registered voters	76,662				

=== Sanlúcar de Barrameda ===
Population: 69,727

← Summary of the 28 May 2023 City Council of Sanlúcar de Barrameda election results →
Parties and alliances	Popular vote			Seats	
Parties and alliances	Votes	%	±pp	Total	+/−
People's Party (PP)	8,665	32.21	+19.15	3	+6
United Left Andalusia (IU–Andalucía)	7,527	27.98	+7.74	7	+1
Spanish Socialist Workers' Party of Andalusia (PSOE–A)	6,879	25.57	−4.96	7	−2
Vox (Vox)	2,520	9.37	+3.65	2	+1
Forward Andalusia (Adelante Andalucía)	502	1.87	New	0	±0
We Can (Podemos)	212	0.79	−5.00	0	−1
Housing and Work (VyT)	199	0.74	New	0	±0
Citizens–Party of the Citizenry (Cs)	n/a	n/a	−18.76	0	−5
Blank ballots	395	1.47	+0.38		
Total	26,899			25	±0
Valid votes	26,899	99.02	−0.03		
Invalid votes	266	0.98	+0.03		
Votes cast / turnout	27,165	48.81	+4.36		
Abstentions	28,486	51.19	−4.36		
Registered voters	55,651				

=== Seville ===
Population: 681,998

=== Torremolinos ===
Population: 68,819

← Summary of the 28 May 2023 City Council of Torremolinos election results →
Parties and alliances	Popular vote			Seats	
Parties and alliances	Votes	%	±pp	Total	+/−
People's Party (PP)	14,497	57.45	+24.95	17	+8
Spanish Socialist Workers' Party of Andalusia (PSOE–A)	4,647	18.41	−11.73	5	−3
Vox (Vox)	2,070	8.20	+0.87	2	±0
With Andalusia: With Torremolinos (Podemos–IU)^{1}	1,655	6.56	−4.71	1	−2
Torremolinos People's Union (UPT)	795	3.15	New	0	±0
Torremolinos Unique–Self-employed Party (TÚPA)	793	3.14	New	0	±0
We Are Torremolinos (SMT)	234	0.93	New	0	±0
Citizens–Party of the Citizenry (CS)	212	0.84	−8.97	0	−2
For my Town (Por mi Pueblo)	n/a	n/a	−5.92	0	−1
Blank ballots	333	1.32	+0.28		
Total	25,236			25	±0
Valid votes	25,236	98.99	−0.11		
Invalid votes	257	1.01	+0.11		
Votes cast / turnout	25,493	54.31	−1.02		
Abstentions	21,443	45.69	+1.02		
Registered voters	46,936				
Sources
Footnotes: ^{1} With Andalusia: With Torremolinos results are compared to Forward Torremolinos: We Can–United Left totals in the 2019 election.

=== Vélez-Málaga ===
Population: 83,899

← Summary of the 28 May 2023 City Council of Vélez-Málaga election results →
Parties and alliances	Popular vote			Seats	
Parties and alliances	Votes	%	±pp	Total	+/−
People's Party (PP)	12,098	32.11	+3.21	9	±0
Pro-Torre del Mar Municipality Independent Group (GIPMTM)	7,983	21.19	+0.86	6	−1
Andalusia by Herself–Andalusian Union (UA)	7,700	20.44	+13.84	6	+4
Spanish Socialist Workers' Party of Andalusia (PSOE–A)	4,760	12.63	−7.88	3	−4
Vox (Vox)	2,023	5.37	+1.69	1	+1
With Andalusia: With Vélez-Málaga (Podemos–IU–MPA–IdPA–VQ)^{1}	1,774	4.71	−3.94	0	±0
For my Town (Por mi Pueblo)	420	1.11	−2.35	0	±0
For La Torre (PLT)	357	0.95	New	0	±0
Citizens–Party of the Citizenry (CS)	225	0.60	−3.42	0	±0
Blank ballots	336	0.89	+0.04		
Total	37,676			25	±0
Valid votes	37,676	98.92	−0.28		
Invalid votes	411	1.08	+0.28		
Votes cast / turnout	38,087	59.90	+0.75		
Abstentions	25,495	40.10	−0.75		
Registered voters	63,582				
Sources
Footnotes: ^{1} With Andalusia: With Vélez-Málaga results are compared to the combined totals of We Can and United Left Andalusia in the 2019 election.
