= La Línea 100x100 =

Spanish political party

- Leader: Juan Franco
- Founder: Juan Franco
- Founded: 2015
- Ideology: Localism
- La Línea de la Concepción City Council: 22 / 25
- Provincial Deputation of Cádiz: 2 / 31

La Línea 100x100 (lit. '100% La Línea') is a Spanish political party in the Andalusian city of La Línea de la Concepción. The party proposes to convert the city into an autonomous city.

The party was founded in 2015 by Juan Franco, who was elected mayor the same year. In 2019 and 2023, the party won more than 20 of the 25 seats on the council, and Franco became the mayor with the highest vote share in a city of over 50,000 inhabitants. The party formed government in the Provincial Deputation of Cádiz in 2019 and 2023, as a junior partner.

== History ==
The party was set up in January 2015, ahead of the local elections in May. In the elections, it came second to the Spanish Socialist Workers' Party (PSOE) of incumbent Gemma Araujo, both with nine seats, while the People's Party (PP) took five seats; La Línea 100x100 founder Juan Franco said he would not form a pact with any party. He was elected mayor with the support of his party, the PP, and unexpectedly the one councillor of the United Left (IU). In his speech, he announced transparency, and that there would likely be tax rises and salary cuts. The three parties formed the local government; an issue in the first term was a pay dispute with the police force.

In the 2019 Spanish local elections, La Línea 100x100 won 21 of 25 seats on the council, compared to three for the PSOE and one for the PP. Four years later, the party added one more seat, while its vote share rose from 68% to 75%. With the 2023 vote, Franco surpassed the mayors of Estepona (José María García Urbano; PP) and Vigo (Abel Caballero; PSOE) as the one with the highest percentage of votes in a city with more than 50,000 inhabitants. During the campaign, he held an event in the Metaverse, in which 30,000 people participated; his city had 50,000 registered voters.

After the 2019 result, the party won representation in the Provincial Deputation of Cádiz and formed its government with the PSOE; Franco became government spokesperson, and another member became responsible for energy transition and sustainable urban development. In 2023, the deputation was split equally with 15 PP and 14 PSOE deputies, and the two from La Línea 100x100 formed government with the latter. Franco described the power of his support as a "sweet" for the highest bidder of the two parties.

Franco registered the party for the 2026 Andalusian regional election in the Cádiz constituency. The party took 2.46% of the vote, with no seats.

== Autonomy proposal ==
In November 2018, Franco's local government proposed the transformation of La Línea de la Concepción as an autonomous city like Ceuta or Melilla, separate from the autonomous community of Andalusia. The party puts forward that the city's issues of low income, unemployment and hashish trafficking from Morocco would be improved with the new status. It is also argued by the party that La Línea suffers as the only Spanish municipality bordering Gibraltar, a territory with an international airport and low tax rates; the project proposes competitive tax rates and representation for the city in international discussions over Gibraltar.

The petition was rejected by the Council of Ministers and in 2023 by the Supreme Court, on the basis that it would alter the territorial organisation and go beyond the power of a municipal council. Franco said in 2024 that he would revive the project if a Catalan independence referendum were to take place.
