= Costa del Sol Sí Puede =

Costa del Sol Can Costa del Sol Sí Puede
- President: Francisco Martinez Avila
- Secretary-General: Coordination Board
- Founded: 2015
- Headquarters: Mijas
- Ideology: Participatory democracy Anty-austerity politics Anti-corruption
- Colours: Persian green

Website
- www.cssp.es

Costa del Sol Sí Puede (Spanish for Costa del Sol Can, CSSP) is a political platform of popular unity, formed as an "instrumental party" that presented lists for the local elections of 2015 and 2019 in the comarca of Costa del Sol with a common platform. CSSP was supported by Podemos, Equo and local social collectives and movements. IULV-CA chose not to join the coalition. Since the 2015 elections, CSSP has moved on and is a totally independent party, with no relation to others. CSSP submits lists to the municipal elections in May 2019 in Torremolinos, Benalmadena, Mijas and Fuengirola. They lost all political power they had and the support of main political parties (Podemos, Equo, ...).

== Election results ==
The party gained representation in some of the town councils of the Costa del Sol. They did not get any representation in cities such as Málaga and minor towns (Manilva, Casares, Vélez-Málaga, Nerja, Torrox, Rincón de la Victoria, Benahavís).

Local elections of 2015
Municipality	Votes	Percentage	Councillors
Benalmádena	1.747	8,41%	2
Estepona	1.609	6,77%	1
Fuengirola	2.034	8,66%	2
Marbella	3.880	8,2%	2
Mijas	1.683	7,26%	2
Torremolinos	3.124	12,6%	3

By 2019 the party did not participate in Estepona and Marbella, and lost all the city council seats they had. The party disappeared after the 2019 elections.

Local elections of 2019
Municipality	Votes	Percentage	Councillors
Benalmádena	95	0,42%	0
Estepona	0	0%	0
Fuengirola	225	0,92%	0
Marbella	0	0%	0
Mijas	311	1,29%	0
Torremolinos	246	0,48%	0
