= 15th Senate of Spain =

Session of Spain after 2023 election

←	14th	16th	→
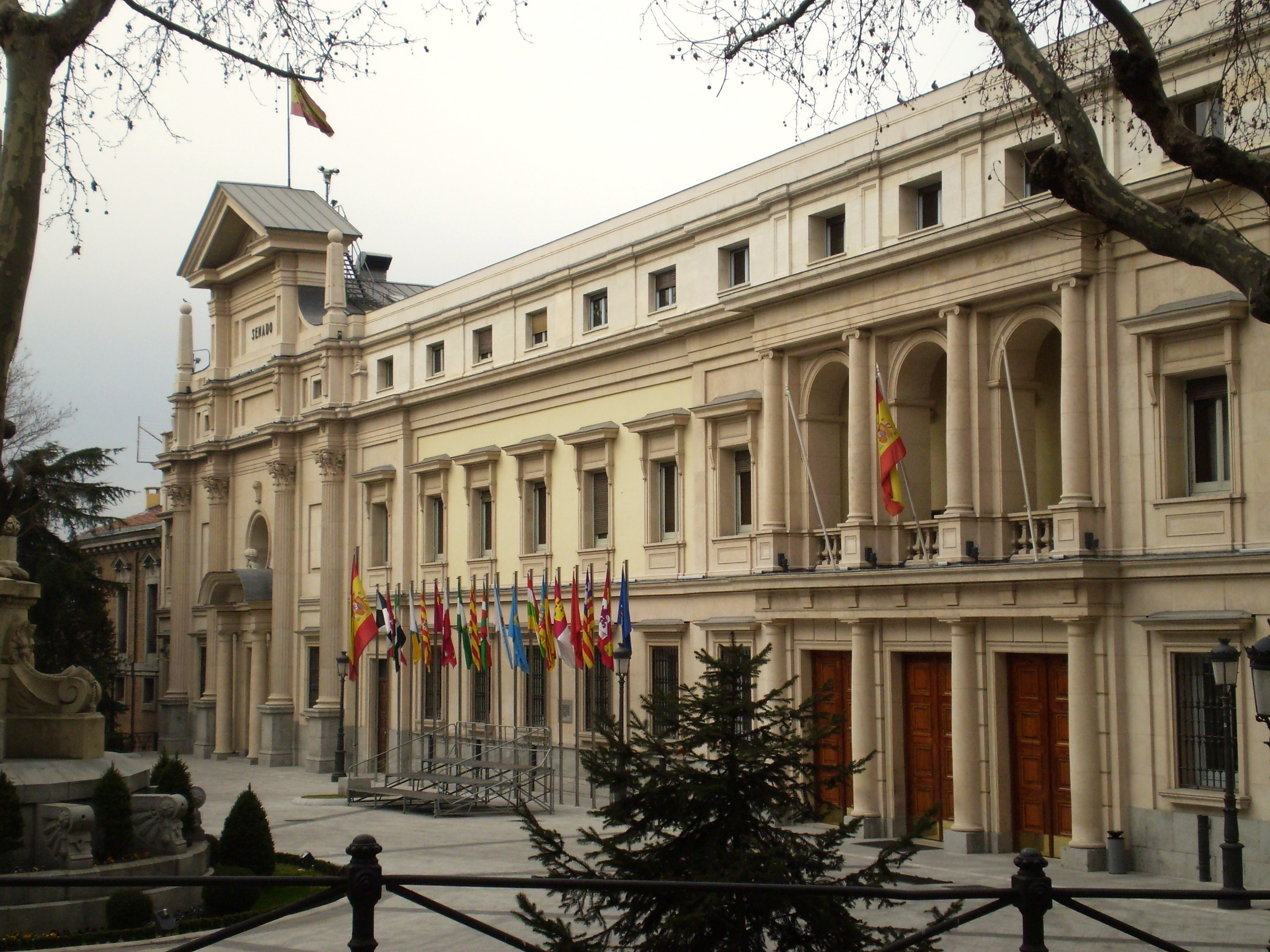

Overview
- Legislative body: Senate of Spain
- Meeting place: Palacio del Senado
- Term: 17 August 2023 – 6 October 2026
- Election: 23 July 2023
- Government: Sánchez III
- Website: senado.es

Senators
- Members: 266
- President: Pedro Rollán (PP)
- First Vice-President: Javier Maroto (PP)
- Second Vice-President: Guillermo Fernández Vara (PSOE) (2023–2025); Concha Andreu (PSOE) (2025–2026)
- First Secretary: Eva Ortiz (PP)
- Second Secretary: Marimar Blanco (PP)
- Third Secretary: Ángeles Luna (PSOE)
- Fourth Secretary: Francisco Fajardo (PSOE)

The 16th Senate of Spain will be a meeting of the Senate of Spain, the upper house of the Spanish Cortes Generales, with the membership determined primarily by the results of the general election held on 29 November 2026. The Senate will meet for the first time on December 2026. According to the Constitution of Spain the maximum legislative term of the senate is 4 years from the preceding election. 208 (of 266) members of the Senate of Spain were elected in the 2023 Spanish general election to sit in the 15th Cortes Generales.

== Background ==
=== Election process ===
Most members of the senate (currently 208 of 266) are directly elected by the people. Each province elects four senators without regard to population. Insular provinces are treated specially. The larger islands of the Balearics (Baleares) and Canaries (Canarias)—Mallorca, Gran Canaria, and Tenerife—are assigned three seats each, and the smaller islands—Menorca, Ibiza–Formentera, Fuerteventura, Gomera, Hierro, Lanzarote and La Palma—one each; Ceuta and Melilla are assigned two seats each.

This allocation is heavily weighted in favour of small provinces; as the most populated province Madrid, with its 6.5 million people, and Soria, with 90,000 inhabitants, are each represented by four senators.

== Election ==
The 16th Spanish general election under the 1978 Constitution was held on 29 November 2026.

Alliance	Votes	%	Seats	+/−
PP	23,536,366	34.54	120	+37
PSOE	21,970,469	32.24	72	−20
Sumar	7,551,985	11.08	0	±0
Vox	7,249,087	10.64	0	−2
ERC-EH Bildu	2,845,828	4.18	7	−5
Junts	1,251,626	1.84	1	−2
PNV	859,968	1.26	4	−5
Other/Blank ballots	385,805	4.22	4	−3
Total	68,152,008	100.00	208	±0

== Composition ==
	PP	PSOE		Vox	ERC	Junts	PNV	EH Bildu	BNG	CC	UPN	AHI	ASG	PAR	Total
	PP	PSOE	PSC	Vox	ERC	Junts	PNV	EH Bildu	BNG	CC	UPN	AHI	ASG	PAR	Total
Elected in 2023	120	60	12	0	3	1	4	4	0		1	1	1		208
Elected before 2023	21	13	3	2	3	2	1	1	1	1				1	51
Total	141	73	15	2	6	3	5	5	1	1	1	1	1	1	259

== Members by province ==
=== Andalusia ===
Constituency	Seats	List	Seats	Deputies	Party
Almería	4	PP	3	Miguel Ángel Castellón Rubio	PP
Almería	4	PP	3	Juan José Matarí	PP
Almería	4	PP	3	Carmen Belen Lopez Zapata	PP
Almería	4	PSOE	1	Antonio Martínez Rodríguez	PSOE
Cádiz	4	PP	3	José Ignacio Landaluce	PP
Cádiz	4	PP	3	María José García-Pelayo Jurado	PP
Cádiz	4	PP	3	María del Carmen Pérez Becerra	PP
Cádiz	4	PSOE	1	Alfonso Moscoso	PSOE
Córdoba	4	PP	3	Fernando Priego Chacón	PP
Córdoba	4	PP	3	Cristina Casanueva Jiménez	PP
Córdoba	4	PP	3	Lorena Guerra Sánchez	PP
Córdoba	4	PSOE	1	María de los Ángeles Luna Morales	PSOE
Granada	4	PP	3	Vicente Azpitarte	PP
Granada	4	PP	3	Francisco Joaquin Camacho Borrego	PP
Granada	4	PP	3	María Eva Martín Pérez	PP
Granada	4	PSOE	1	José Entrena Ávila	PSOE
Huelva	4	PP	2	Carmelo Romero	PP
Huelva	4	PP	2	Juan Manuel González Camacho	PP
Huelva	4	PSOE	2	María Eugenia Limón	PSOE
Huelva	4	PSOE	2	Amaro Huelva	PSOE
Jaén	4	PP	3	Francisco Javier Márquez Sánchez	PP
Jaén	4	PP	3	Mariola Aranda García	PP
Jaén	4	PP	3	Javier Bermúdez	PP
Jaén	4	PSOE	1	José Latorre Ruiz	PSOE
Málaga	4	PP	3	José Alberto Armijo Navas	PP
Málaga	4	PP	3	Ángel Luis González Muñoz	PP
Málaga	4	PP	3	Lucía Yeves Leal	PP
Málaga	4	PSOE	1	Rafael Granados Ruiz	PSOE
Seville	4	PSOE	3	Antonio Gutiérrez Limones	PSOE
Seville	4	PSOE	3	Eva Patricia Bueno Campanario	PSOE
Seville	4	PSOE	3	Antonio Muñoz	PSOE
Seville	4	PP	1	Juan Manuel Avila Gutierrez	PP

=== Aragon ===
Constituency	Seats	List	Seats	Deputies	Party
Huesca	4	PP	3	Melania Mur Sangrá	PP
Huesca	4	PP	3	Javier Campoy Monreal	PP
Huesca	4	PP	3	Ana María Beltrán Villalba	PP
Huesca	4	PSOE	1	Rosa María Serrano Sierra	PSOE
Teruel	4	PP	3	Luisa Fernanda Rudi Úbeda	PP
Teruel	4	PP	3	María del Rocío Dívar Conde	PP
Teruel	4	PP	3	José Manuel Aranda Lassa	PP
Teruel	4	PSOE	1	Miguel Carmelo Dalmau Blanco	PSOE
Zaragoza	4	PP	3	Emma Buj Sánchez	PP
Zaragoza	4	PP	3	Carmen Pobo Sánchez	PP
Zaragoza	4	PP	3	Manuel Blasco Marqués	PP
Zaragoza	4	PSOE	1	María José Villalba Chavarría	PSOE

=== Asturias ===
Constituency	Seats	List	Seats	Deputies	Party
Asturias	4	PP	3	Pablo González Menéndez	PP
Asturias	4	PP	3	María Teresa Mallada de Castro	PP
Asturias	4	PP	3	José Manuel Fernández Díaz	PP
Asturias	4	PSOE	1	María Fernández Álvarez	PSOE

=== Balearic Islands ===
Constituency	Seats	List	Seats	Deputies	Party
Ibiza–Formentera	1	PSOE	1	Juanjo Ferrer Martínez	PSOE
Mallorca	3	PP		Maria Salom Coll	PP
Mallorca	3	PP		Martí Ángel Torres Valls	PP
Mallorca	3	PSOE		Pere Joan Pons	PSOE
Menorca	1	PP		Cristóbal Marqués Palliser	PP

=== Basque Country ===
Constituency	Seats	List	Seats	Deputies	Party
Álava	4	PSOE	3	Julia Liberal Liberal	PSOE
Álava	4	PSOE	3	Adolfo Lander Vera	PSOE
Álava	4	PSOE	3	Paula Somalo García	PSOE
Álava	4	EH Bildu	1	Josu Estarrona Elizondo	EH Bildu
Biscay	4	PNV	3	Nerea Ahedo Ceza	PNV
Biscay	4	PNV	3	María Dolores Etxano Varela	PNV
Biscay	4	PNV	3	Igotz López Torre	PNV
Biscay	4	PSOE	1	Txema Oleaga	PSOE
Gipuzkoa	4	EH Bildu	3	Gorka Elejabarrieta Diaz	EH Bildu
Gipuzkoa	4	EH Bildu	3	Olaia Duarte López	EH Bildu
Gipuzkoa	4	EH Bildu	3	Mario Zubiaga	EH Bildu
Gipuzkoa	4	PNV	1	Luke Uribe-Etxebarria	PNV

=== Canary Islands ===
Constituency	Seats	List	Seats	Deputies	Party
El Hierro	1	AHI	1	Aniceto Javier Armas González	AHI
Fuerteventura	1	PSOE	1	Paloma Hernández Cerezo	PSOE
Gran Canaria	3	PSOE	2	Ramón Morales Quesada	PSOE
Gran Canaria	3	PSOE	2	Marta Jorgina Saavedra Doménech	PSOE
Gran Canaria	3	PP	1	Sergio Ramos Acosta	PP
La Gomera	1	ASG	1	Fabián Chinea Correa	ASG
La Palma	1	PSOE	1	Kilian Sánchez San Juan	PSOE
Lanzarote	1	PSOE	1	Francisco Manuel Fajardo Palarea	PSOE
Tenerife	3	PSOE	2	Pedro Manuel Martín Domínguez	PSOE
Tenerife	3	PSOE	2	Marta Arocha Correa	PSOE
Tenerife	3	PP	1	Emilio José Navarro Castenedo	PP

=== Cantabria ===
Constituency	Seats	List	Seats	Deputies	Party
Cantabria	4	PP	3	Elena Castillo López	PP
Cantabria	4	PP	3	Severiano Ángel Cuesta Alonso	PP
Cantabria	4	PP	3	Juan Carlos García Diego	PP
Cantabria	4	PSOE	1	Secundino Caso Roiz	PSOE

=== Castilla–La Mancha ===
Constituency	Seats	List	Seats	Deputies	Party
Albacete	4	PP	3	Simón Valentín Bueno Vargas	PP
Albacete	4	PP	3	Miriam García Navarro	PP
Albacete	4	PP	3	Pilar Rojo Noguera	PP
Albacete	4	PSOE	1	Amparo Torres Valencoso	PSOE
Ciudad Real	4	PP	3	Rosa Romero Sánchez	PP
Ciudad Real	4	PP	3	Leopoldo Jerónimo Sierra Gallardo	PP
Ciudad Real	4	PP	3	Raúl Dalmacio Valero Mejía	PP
Ciudad Real	4	PSOE	1	Julián Nieva Delgado	PSOE
Cuenca	4	PP	3	Benjamín Prieto Valencia	PP
Cuenca	4	PP	3	María Jesús Bonilla Domínguez	PP
Cuenca	4	PP	3	Alejo Joaquín Miranda de Larra Arnaiz	PP
Cuenca	4	PSOE	1	Carmen Torralba Valiente	PSOE
Guadalajara	4	PP	3	Lucas Castillo Rodríguez	PP
Guadalajara	4	PP	3	María Patricio Zafra	PP
Guadalajara	4	PP	3	María Montserrat Rivas de la Torre	PP
Guadalajara	4	PSOE	1	Araceli Martínez Esteban	PSOE
Toledo	4	PP	3	Vicente Tirado	PP
Toledo	4	PP	3	Israel Roberto Pérez Jiménez	PP
Toledo	4	PP	3	María Carmen Riolobos Regadera	PP
Toledo	4	PSOE	1	José Manuel Tofiño Pérez	PSOE

=== Castile and León ===
Constituency	Seats	List	Seats	Deputies	Party
Ávila	4	PP	3	Juan Pablo Martín Martín	PP
Ávila	4	PP	3	Alicia García Rodríguez	PP
Ávila	4	PP	3	Piedad Sánchez García	PP
Ávila	4	PSOE	1	Jesús Caro Adanero	PSOE
Burgos	4	PP	3	Javier Lacalle	PP
Burgos	4	PP	3	Salvador de Foronda Vaquero	PP
Burgos	4	PP	3	Raquel González Benito	PP
Burgos	4	PSOE	1	Ander Gil García	PSOE
León	4	PP	3	Antonio Silván Rodríguez	PP
León	4	PP	3	María Asunción Mayo Fernández	PP
León	4	PP	3	Jorge García Vega	PP
León	4	PSOE	1	Salvador Vidal Varela	PSOE
Palencia	4	PP	3	Jorge Domingo Martínez Antolín	PP
Palencia	4	PP	3	Carlos Alfonso Polanco Rebolleda	PP
Palencia	4	PP	3	María José Ortega Gómez	PP
Palencia	4	PSOE	1	Rosa María Aldea Gómez	PSOE
Salamanca	4	PP	3	Bienvenido de Arriba	PP
Salamanca	4	PP	3	Gonzalo Robles Orozco	PP
Salamanca	4	PP	3	Esther Basilia del Brío González	PP
Salamanca	4	PSOE	1	Elena Diego	PSOE
Segovia	4	PP	3	Paloma Sanz	PP
Segovia	4	PP	3	Juan José Sanz Vitorio	PP
Segovia	4	PP	3	María Ángeles García Herrero	PP
Segovia	4	PSOE	1	María del Lirio Martín García	PSOE
Soria	4	PP	3	José Manuel Hernando García	PP
Soria	4	PP	3	Javier Jiménez Santamaría	PP
Soria	4	PP	3	María Cristina Rubio Blasco	PP
Soria	4	PSOE	1	Javier Antón Cacho	PSOE
Valladolid	4	PP	3	Jesús Julio Carnero	PP
Valladolid	4	PP	3	José Ángel Alonso Pérez	PP
Valladolid	4	PP	3	Arenales Serrano	PP
Valladolid	4	PSOE	1	José Javier Izquierdo Roncero	PSOE
Zamora	4	PP	3	José María Barrios	PP
Zamora	4	PP	3	Natalia Ucero Pérez	PP
Zamora	4	PP	3	Fernando Martínez Maíllo	PP
Zamora	4	PSOE	1	José Fernández Blanco	PSOE

=== Catalonia ===
Constituency	Seats	List	Seats	Deputies	Party
Barcelona	4	PSC	3	Manuel Cruz Rodríguez	PSC
Barcelona	4	PSC	3	Elena Vila Gómez	PSC
Barcelona	4	PSC	3	Gabriel Colomé García	PSC
Barcelona	4	ERC	1	Joan Queralt i Jiménez	ERC
Girona	4	PSC	3	Consol Cantenys Arbolí	PSC
Girona	4	PSC	3	Martí Sans i Pairuto	PSC
Girona	4	PSC	3	Lluïsa Blanch Fulcarà	PSC
Girona	4	Junts	1	Joan Bagué	Junts
Lleida	4	PSC	3	Dionís Oña Martín	PSC
Lleida	4	PSC	3	Pasión Gador Romero García	PSC
Lleida	4	PSC	3	Jan Pomés López	PSC
Lleida	4	ERC	1	Sara Bailac i Ardanuy	ERC
Tarragona	4	PSC	3	Manel de la Vega Carrera	PSC
Tarragona	4	PSC	3	Núria Rovira Costas	PSC
Tarragona	4	PSC	3	Mario Soler Santos	PSC
Tarragona	4	ERC	1	Jordi Gaseni Blanch	ERC

=== Extremadura ===
Constituency	Seats	List	Seats	Deputies	Party
Badajoz	4	PSOE	2	Rafael Lemus Rubiales	PSOE
Badajoz	4	PSOE	2	María Teresa Macías	PSOE
Badajoz	4	PP	2	José Antonio Monago Terraza	PP
Badajoz	4	PP	2	Carmen Pagador López	PP
Cáceres	4	PP	2	Mónica Grados Caro	PP
Cáceres	4	PP	2	María Dolores Marcos Moyano	PP
Cáceres	4	PSOE	2	Miguel Ángel Nacarino Muriel	PSOE
Cáceres	4	PSOE	2	María Isabel Moreno Duque	PSOE

=== Galicia ===
Constituency	Seats	List	Seats	Deputies	Party
A Coruña	4	PP	3	Rosa Gallego	PP
A Coruña	4	PP	3	Verónica Casal	PP
A Coruña	4	PP	3	Manuel Ruiz Rivas	PP
A Coruña	4	PSOE	1	Xosé Antonio Sánchez Bugallo	PSOE
Lugo	4	PP	3	José Manuel Barreiro Fernández	PP
Lugo	4	PP	3	María José Gómez Rodríguez	PP
Lugo	4	PP	3	Juan Serrano	PP
Lugo	4	PSOE	1	César Alejandro Mogo Zaro	PSOE
Ourense	4	PP	3	Carmen Leyte	PP
Ourense	4	PP	3	Luís Menor	PP
Ourense	4	PP	3	Rosa María Sánchez Gándara	PP
Ourense	4	PSOE	1	Rafael Rodríguez Villarino	PSOE
Pontevedra	4	PP	3	María José Pardo	PP
Pontevedra	4	PP	3	José Crespo	PP
Pontevedra	4	PP	3	Nidia Arévalo	PP
Pontevedra	4	PSOE	1	Carmela Silva	PSOE

=== Madrid ===
Constituency	Seats	List	Seats	Deputies	Party
Madrid	4	PP	3	Pedro Rollán	PP
Madrid	4	PP	3	Pío García-Escudero	PP
Madrid	4	PP	3	Paloma Martín Martín	PP
Madrid	4	PSOE	1	José Manuel Franco	PSOE

=== Murcia ===
Constituency	Seats	List	Seats	Deputies	Party
Murcia	4	PP	3	Francisco Bernabé	PP
Murcia	4	PP	3	Antonio Luengo Zapata	PP
Murcia	4	PP	3	Antonia López Moya	PP
Murcia	4	PSOE	1	Inmaculada Sánchez Roca	PSOE

=== Navarre ===
Constituency	Seats	List	Seats	Deputies	Party
Navarre	4	PSOE	3	Javier Remírez	PSOE
Navarre	4	PSOE	3	Nuria Medina Santos	PSOE
Navarre	4	PSOE	3	Antonio Magdaleno Alegría	PSOE
Navarre	4	UPN	1	María Mar Caballero Martínez	UPN

=== La Rioja ===
Constituency	Seats	List	Seats	Deputies	Party
La Rioja	4	PP	3	Luis Martínez-Portillo Subero	PP
La Rioja	4	PP	3	Carlos Yécora Roca	PP
La Rioja	4	PP	3	María del Mar San Martín Ibarra	PP
La Rioja	4	PSOE	1	Concha Andreu	PSOE

=== Valencian Community ===
Constituency	Seats	List	Seats	Deputies	Party
Alicante	4	PP	3	Eva Ortiz Vilella	PP
Alicante	4	PP	3	Agustín Almodóbar Barceló	PP
Alicante	4	PP	3	María Dolores Esteve Juan	PP
Alicante	4	PSOE	1	Ana Martínez Zaragoza	PSOE
Castellón	4	PP	3	Vicente Martínez Mus	PP
Castellón	4	PP	3	Susana Marqués Escoín	PP
Castellón	4	PP	3	Vicente Tejedo Tormo	PP
Castellón	4	PSOE	1	Amparo Marco	PSOE
Valencia	4	PP	2	Estela del Carmen Darocas Marin	PP
Valencia	4	PP	2	Luis Santamaría Ruiz	PP
Valencia	4	PSOE	2	Juan Antonio Sagredo Marco	PSOE
Valencia	4	PSOE	2	Cristina Moreno Fernández	PSOE

=== Ceuta ===
Constituency	Seats	List	Seats	Deputies	Party
Ceuta	2	PP	2	Cristina Díaz Moreno	PP
Ceuta	2	PP	2	Abdelhakim Abdeselam Al Lal	PP

=== Melilla ===
Constituency	Seats	List	Seats	Deputies	Party
Melilla	2	PP	2	Fernando Adolfo Gutiérrez Díaz de Otazu	PP
Melilla	2	PP	2	Isabel María Moreno Mohamed	PP
