= Senator Moreno =

Senator Moreno may refer to:

== Colombia (Senate of the Republic) ==
- Alexandra Moreno Piraquive (born 1969), senator in 2002–2014
- Carlos Moreno de Caro (born 1946), senator in 1998–2006

== Mexico (Senate of the Republic) ==
- Alito Moreno (born 1975), senator for Campeche in 2006–2011, senator-at-large since 2024
- Manuel Moreno Sánchez (1908–1993), senator for Aguascalientes in 1958–1964
- María de los Ángeles Moreno (1945–2019), senator for the Federal District in 1994–2000, senator-at-large in 2006–2012
- Rafael Moreno Valle (1917–2016), senator for Puebla in 1958–1964
- Rafael Moreno Valle Rosas (1968–2018), senator for Puebla in 2006–2010

== Spain (Senate of Spain) ==
- Isabel Moreno (politician, born 1984), senator for Melilla since 2023 (elected)
- Juanma Moreno (born 1970), senator for Andalusia in 2014–2017 (designated)

== United States ==
- Bernie Moreno (born 1967), U.S. senator for Ohio since 2025
- Dominick Moreno (born 1985), Colorado state senator for the 21st district in 2017–2023
