= Carmen Belén López Zapata =

Spanish politician (born 1978)

Carmen Belén López Zapata (born 23 February 1978 in Almería) is a Spanish politician from the People's Party (PP). She was the territorial delegate for Development, Territorial Articulation and Housing in Andalusia. In the 2023 Spanish general election she was elected to the Senate of Spain from Almería.

== See also ==
- 15th Senate of Spain
