= La Palma (Senate constituency) =

Senate constituency in Spain

Coordinates: 28°40′N 17°52′W

- Senate of Spain; Electoral constituency
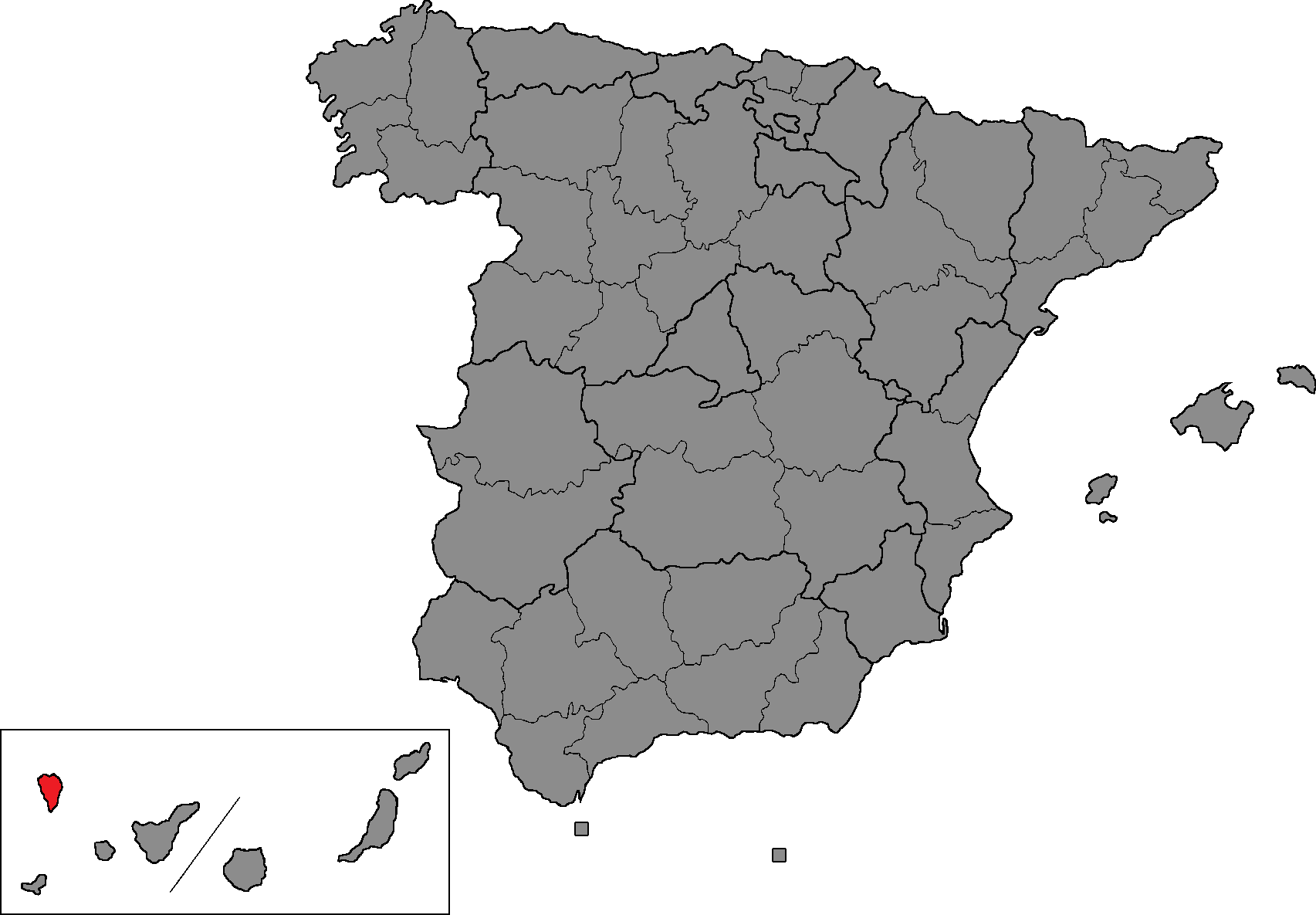
- Location of La Palma within Spain
- Island: La Palma
- Autonomous community: Canary Islands
- Population: ▲85,104 (2024)
- Electorate: ▲86,978 (2023)
- Major settlements: Los Llanos de Aridane

Current constituency
- Created: 1977
- Seats: 1
- Member: PSOE (1)

La Palma is one of the 60 constituencies represented in the Senate of Spain, the upper chamber of the Spanish parliament, the Cortes Generales. The constituency (whose boundaries correspond to those of the homonymous island) elects one senator. The electoral system uses open-list (Note: Parties can group candidates into lists, although each candidate is treated separately for the purpose of the voting procedure.) partial block voting, with electors voting for individual candidates instead of parties.

== Electoral system ==
The constituency was created as per the Political Reform Law and was first contested in the 1977 general election. The Law provided for the provinces of Spain to be established as multi-member districts in the Senate, with this regulation being maintained under the Spanish Constitution of 1978. Additionally, the Constitution requires for any modification of the provincial limits to be approved under an organic law, needing an absolute majority in the Cortes Generales.

Voting is based on universal suffrage, comprising all Spanish nationals over 18 years of age with full political rights, provided that they have not been deprived of the right to vote by a final sentence. The only exception was in 1977, when this was limited to nationals over 21 years of age and in full enjoyment of their political and civil rights. Amendments in 2011 required non-resident citizens to apply for voting, a system known as "begged" voting (Spanish: Voto rogado). which was abolished in 2022. Further, amendments in 2018 granted the right to vote to those legally incapacitated. 209 Senate seats (207 in 1977, 208 from 1978 to 2026) are elected using open-list partial block voting: voters in constituencies electing four seats can choose up to three candidates; in those with two or three seats, up to two; and in single-member districts, one. Each of the 47 peninsular provinces is allocated four seats, while in insular provinces—such as the Balearic and Canary Islands—the districts are the islands themselves, with the larger ones (Mallorca, Gran Canaria and Tenerife) being allocated three seats each, and the smaller ones (Menorca, Ibiza, Formentera, Fuerteventura, La Gomera, El Hierro, Lanzarote and La Palma) one each. (Note: La Gomera and El Hierro comprised a single constituency for the 1977 election. A constitutional reform in 2026 awarded Formentera an independent senator separate from Ibiza.) Ceuta and Melilla elect two seats each. Until 1985, the law also provided for by-elections to fill Senate seats vacated up to two years into the legislature; subsequently, any vacancies arising after the proclamation of candidates and during the legislative term are filled by the next candidates on the party lists or, when required, by designated substitutes.

The electoral law allows for parties and federations registered in the interior ministry, alliances and groupings of electors to present lists of candidates. Parties and federations intending to form an alliance are required to inform the relevant electoral commission within 10 days of the election call—15 before 1985—whereas groupings of electors need to secure the signature of at least one percent of the electorate in the constituencies for which they seek election—one permille of the electorate, with a compulsory minimum of 500 signatures, until 1985—disallowing electors from signing for more than one list. Also since 2011, parties, federations or alliances that have not obtained a mandate in either chamber of the Cortes at the preceding election are required to secure the signature of at least 0.1 percent of electors in the aforementioned constituencies. Amendments in 2007 required a balanced composition of men and women in the electoral lists, so that candidates of either sex made up at least 40 percent of the total composition; further amendments in 2024 required the use of a zipper system.

== Senators ==
Senators for La Palma 1977–
Key to parties PSOE CCa UCD PP CP
Legislature	Election	Distribution
Constituent	1977	1
1st	1979	1
2nd	1982	1
3rd	1986	1
4th	1989	1
5th	1993	1
6th	1996	1
7th	2000	1
8th	2004	1
9th	2008	1
10th	2011	1
11th	2015	1
12th	2016	1
13th	2019 (Apr)	1
14th	2019 (Nov)	1
15th	2023	1

== General elections ==
=== 2023 ===
Summary of the 23 July 2023 Senate of Spain election results in La Palma
Parties and alliances	Popular vote			Seats	
Parties and alliances	Votes	%	±pp	Total	+/−
Spanish Socialist Workers' Party (PSOE)	12,912	30.59	−0.03	1	+1
People's Party (PP)	12,685	30.05	−3.50	0	−1
Canarian Coalition (CCa)^{1}	11,090	26.27	n/a	0	±0
Unite Canaries (Sumar Canarias)^{2}	2,282	5.41	−1.96	0	±0
Vox (Vox)	2,254	5.34	−0.05	0	±0
Animalist Party with the Environment (PACMA)^{3}	282	0.67	−0.64	0	±0
New Canaries–Canarian Bloc (NC–BC)^{1}	269	0.64	n/a	0	±0
Canaries Now–Communist Party of the Canarian People (ANC–UP–PCPC)	52	0.12	−0.21	0	±0
Zero Cuts (Recortes Cero)	32	0.08	−0.18	0	±0
Blank ballots (Note: The percentage of blank ballots is calculated over the official number of valid votes cast, irrespective of the total number of votes shown as a result of adding up the individual results for each party.)	358	0.85	−0.41		
Total	42,215			1	±0
Valid votes	42,215	97.50	+0.49		
Invalid votes	1,082	2.50	−0.49		
Votes cast / turnout	43,297	49.78	+3.94		
Abstentions	43,681	50.22	−3.94		
Registered voters	86,978				
Sources
Footnotes: ^{1} Within the Canarian Coalition–New Canaries alliance in the November 2019 election.; ^{2} Unite Canaries results are compared to United We Can totals in the November 2019 election.; ^{3} Animalist Party with the Environment results are compared to Animalist Party Against Mistreatment of Animals totals in the November 2019 election.

=== November 2019 ===
Summary of the 10 November 2019 Senate of Spain election results in La Palma
Parties and alliances	Popular vote			Seats	
Parties and alliances	Votes	%	±pp	Total	+/−
People's Party (PP)	12,735	33.55		1	+1
Spanish Socialist Workers' Party (PSOE)	11,621	30.62		0	−1
Canarian Coalition–New Canaries (CCa–PNC–NC)^{1}	6,277	16.54		0	±0
United We Can (Podemos–IU)	2,796	7.37		0	±0
Vox (Vox)	2,046	5.39		0	±0
Citizens–Party of the Citizenry (Cs)	1,279	3.37		0	±0
Animalist Party Against Mistreatment of Animals (PACMA)	497	1.31		0	±0
Canaries Now (ANC–UP)	125	0.33		0	±0
Zero Cuts–Green Group (Recortes Cero–GV)	99	0.26		0	±0
Blank ballots	478	1.26			
Total	37,953			1	±0
Valid votes	37,953	97.01			
Invalid votes	1,169	2.99			
Votes cast / turnout	39,122	45.84			
Abstentions	46,226	54.16			
Registered voters	85,348				
Sources
Footnotes: ^{1} Canarian Coalition–New Canaries results are compared to the combined totals of Canarian Coalition–Canarian Nationalist Party and New Canaries in the April 2019 election.

=== 1977 ===
Summary of the 15 June 1977 Senate of Spain election results in La Palma
Parties and alliances	Popular vote			Seats	
Parties and alliances	Votes	%	±pp	Total	+/−
Union of the Democratic Centre (UCD)	17,184	55.77	n/a	1	n/a
People's Alliance (AP)	10,192	33.07	n/a	0	n/a
Spanish Socialist Workers' Party (PSOE)	3,439	11.16	n/a	0	n/a
Blank ballots			n/a		
Total	30,815			1	n/a
Valid votes			n/a		
Invalid votes			n/a		
Votes cast / turnout			n/a		
Abstentions			n/a		
Registered voters	49,984				

== Bibliography ==
- Ley 1/1977, de 4 de enero, para la Reforma Política (Fundamental Law 1/1977). Official State Gazette (in Spanish). 4 January 1977. BOE-A-1977-165.
- Real Decreto-ley 20/1977, de 18 de marzo, sobre Normas Electorales (Royal Decree-Law 20/1977). Official State Gazette (in Spanish). 18 March 1977. BOE-A-1977-7445.
- Constitución Española (Constitution). Official State Gazette (in Spanish). 27 December 1978. BOE-A-1978-31229.
- Ley Orgánica 5/1985, de 19 de junio, del Régimen Electoral General (Organic Law 5/1985). Official State Gazette (in Spanish). 19 June 1985. BOE-A-1985-11672.
- Carreras de Odriozola, Albert; Tafunell Sambola, Xavier (2005) [1989]. Estadísticas históricas de España, siglos XIX-XX (PDF) (in Spanish). Vol. 1 (II ed.). Bilbao: Fundación BBVA. pp. 1072–1097. ISBN 84-96515-00-1. Archived from the original (PDF) on 24 September 2015.
