= Javier Bermúdez =

Spanish politician (born 1972)

Member of the Senate
- Incumbent
- Assumed office 23 July 2023
- Constituency: Jaén

Personal details
- Born: 19 August 1972 (age 53)
- Party: People's Party

Francisco Javier Bermúdez Carrillo (born 19 August 1972) is a Spanish politician serving as a member of the Senate since 2023. He has served as mayor of Siles since 2007.
