= Lucas Castillo =

Spanish politician (born 1986)

Member of the Senate
- Incumbent
- Assumed office 23 July 2023
- Constituency: Guadalajara

Personal details
- Born: 10 December 1986 (age 39)
- Party: People's Party

Lucas Castillo Rodríguez (born 10 December 1986) is a Spanish politician serving as a member of the Senate since 2023. He has served as mayor of Yunquera de Henares since 2019.
