= Alejo Miranda de Larra =

Spanish politician (born 1981)

Member of the Senate
- Incumbent
- Assumed office 23 July 2023
- Constituency: Cuenca

Personal details
- Born: 14 August 1981 (age 44)
- Party: People's Party

Alejo Joaquín Miranda de Larra Arnaiz (born 14 August 1981) is a Spanish politician serving as a member of the Senate since 2023. He has served as chairman of the digital transformation committee since 2023.
