= María Patricio =

Spanish politician (born 1988)

Member of the Senate
- Incumbent
- Assumed office 23 July 2023
- Constituency: Guadalajara

Personal details
- Born: 18 April 1988 (age 37)
- Party: People's Party

María Patricio Zafra (born 18 April 1988) is a Spanish politician serving as a member of the Senate since 2023. Until 2023, she served as third deputy mayor of Guadalajara.
