= Antonio Martínez Rodríguez =

Spanish politician (born 1980)

Antonio Martínez

Member of the Senate
- Incumbent
- Assumed office 21 February 2020
- Preceded by: Fernando Martínez
- Constituency: Almería

Personal details
- Born: 29 September 1980 (age 45)
- Party: Spanish Socialist Workers' Party

Antonio Martínez Rodríguez (born 29 September 1980) is a Spanish politician serving as a member of the Senate since 2020. From 2019 to 2020, he was a member of the board of directors of Radio y Televisión de Andalucía.
