= María Jesús Bonilla =

Spanish politician (born 1964)

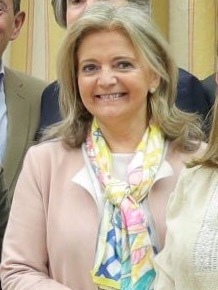
- Bonilla in 2018

Member of the Senate
- Incumbent
- Assumed office 23 July 2023
- Constituency: Cuenca
- In office 12 March 2000 – 17 June 2003
- Constituency: Cuenca

Member of the Congress of Deputies
- In office 22 July 2019 – 24 September 2019
- Preceded by: Rafael Catalá
- Constituency: Cuenca
- In office 1 April 2008 – 21 May 2019
- Constituency: Cuenca

Personal details
- Born: María Jesús Bonilla Domínguez; 28 July 1964 (age 61)
- Party: People's Party

María Jesús Bonilla Domínguez (born 28 July 1964) is a Spanish politician. She has been a member of the Senate since 2023, having previously served from 2000 to 2003. She was a member of the Congress of Deputies from 2008 to 2019 and from July to September 2019. From 2011 to 2015, she served as mayor of Tarancón.
