= Inmaculada Sánchez Roca =

Spanish politician (born 1986)

Member of the Senate
- Incumbent
- Assumed office 23 July 2023
- Constituency: Murcia

Personal details
- Born: 12 August 1986 (age 39)
- Party: Spanish Socialist Workers' Party

Inmaculada Sánchez Roca (born 12 August 1986) is a Spanish politician serving as a member of the Senate since 2023. From 2015 to 2023, she served as mayor of Santomera.
