= Kilian Sánchez San Juan =

Spanish politician (born 1991)

Member of the Senate
- Incumbent
- Assumed office 17 August 2023
- Constituency: La Palma

Personal details
- Born: 18 June 1991 (age 34)
- Party: Spanish Socialist Workers' Party

Kilian Sánchez San Juan (born 18 June 1991) is a Spanish politician serving as a member of the Senate since 2023. He has served as secretary of health of the Spanish Socialist Workers' Party since 2024.
