= Mariola Aranda =

Spanish politician (born 1978)

Member of the Senate
- Incumbent
- Assumed office 27 July 2023
- Constituency: Jaén

Personal details
- Born: 14 October 1978 (age 47)
- Party: People's Party

Mariola Aranda García (born 14 October 1978) is a Spanish politician serving as a member of the Senate since 2023. From 2015 to 2023, she served as mayor of Linares.
