= María del Carmen Pérez Becerra =

Spanish politician

María del Carmen Pérez Becerra (born 6 September 1982 in Sanlúcar de Barrameda) is a Spanish politician from the People's Party (PP). In the 2023 Spanish general election she was elected to the Senate of Spain from Cádiz.
