= Joaquín Camacho (Spanish politician) =

Spanish politician (born 1983)

Member of the Senate
- Incumbent
- Assumed office 23 July 2023
- Constituency: Granada

Personal details
- Born: 28 July 1983 (age 42)
- Party: People's Party

Francisco Joaquín Camacho Borrego (born 28 July 1983) is a Spanish politician serving as a member of the Senate since 2023. From 2011 to 2025, he served as mayor of Loja.
