= Miriam García (politician) =

Spanish politician (born 1992)

Member of the Senate
- Incumbent
- Assumed office 23 July 2023
- Constituency: Albacete

Personal details
- Born: 18 January 1992 (age 34)
- Party: People's Party

Miriam García Navarro (born 18 January 1992) is a Spanish politician serving as a member of the Senate since 2023. From 2019 to 2023, she was a municipal councillor of Hellín.
