= Elena Vila =

Spanish politician (born 1983)

Member of the Senate
- Incumbent
- Assumed office 23 July 2023
- Constituency: Barcelona

Personal details
- Born: 29 August 1983 (age 43)
- Party: Socialists' Party of Catalonia

Elena Vila Gómez (born 29 August 1983) is a Spanish politician serving as a member of the Senate since 2023. She has served as spokersperson of the Socialists' Party of Catalonia in the city council of Sant Cugat del Vallès since 2023.
