= María Teresa Macías =

Spanish politician

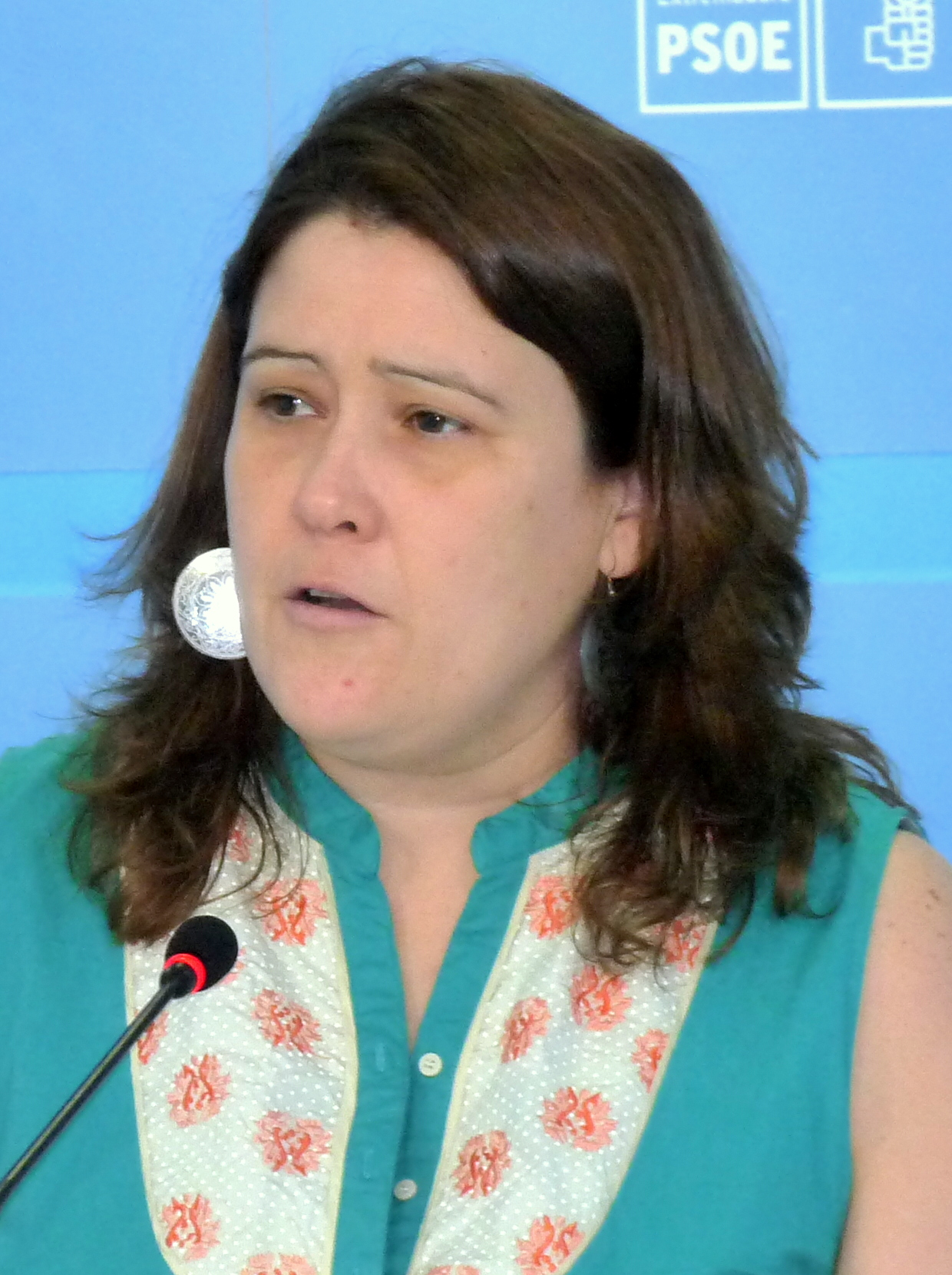

Senator at Cortes Generales
- Incumbent
- Assumed office 21 May 2019

Personal details
- Born: 29 September 1975 (age 51)
- Party: Spanish Socialist Workers' Party

María Teresa Macías (born 29 September 1975 in Badajoz, Spain) is a Spanish politician and senator. She serves the Chairman of the Agriculture, Fisheries and Food Committee of the Spanish Senate. She was elected senator on 21 May 2019, after the general elections.
