= José Manuel Barreiro =

Spanish politician

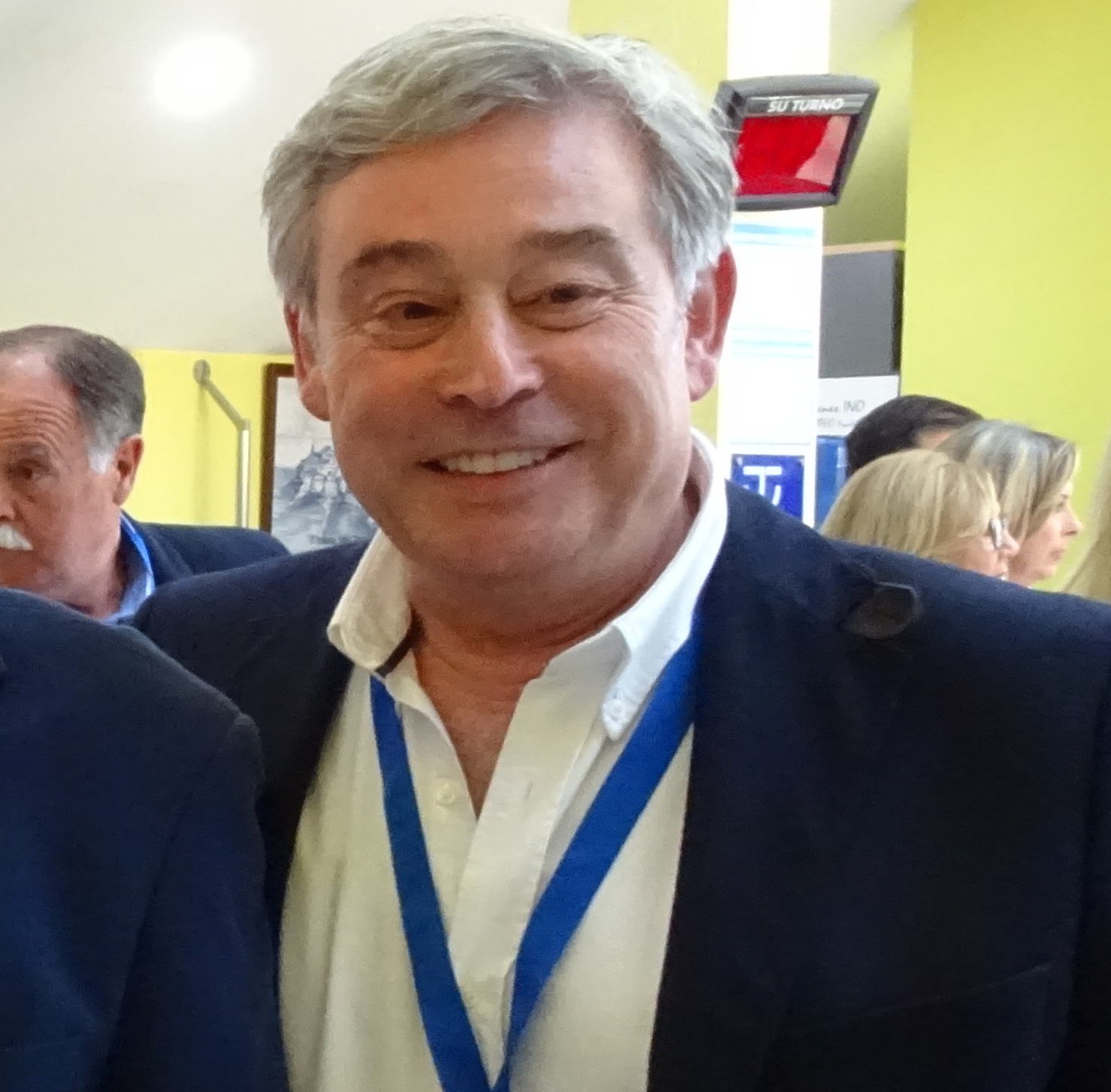
- Born: 18 September 1957 (age 68)
- Occupations: politician, senator
- Political party: People's Party of Spain

José Manuel Barreiro Fernández (born 18 September 1957 in Lugo, Spain) is a Spanish politician and senator. Barreiro is a member of the People's Party of Spain. He was elected senator to represent the Lugo district. He has been senator in the Cortes Generales of Spain since 1 April 2008.
