= Cristóbal Marqués =

Spanish politician (born 1984)

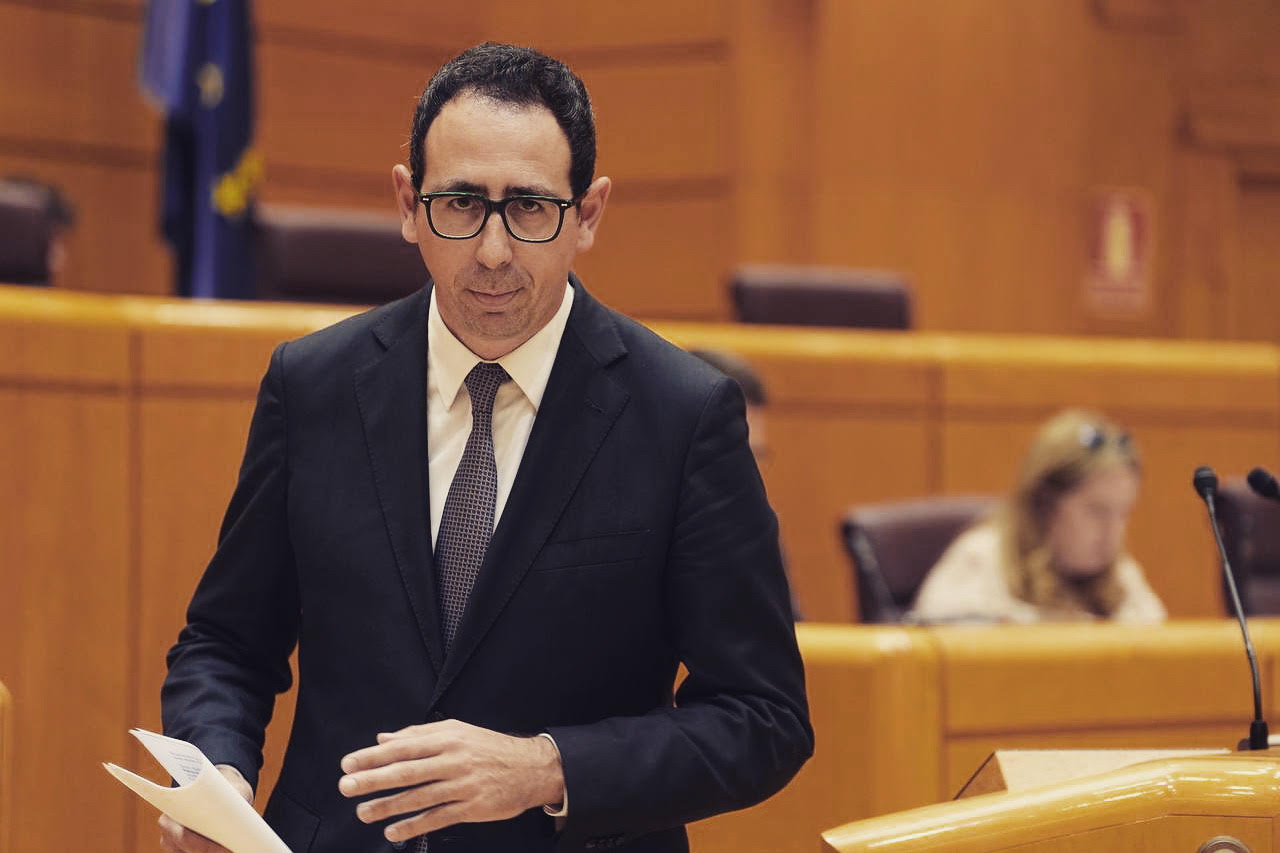
- Marqués in 2023

Member of the Senate
- Incumbent
- Assumed office 24 November 2020
- Preceded by: Jordi López
- Constituency: Menorca

Personal details
- Born: 6 May 1984 (age 41)
- Party: People's Party

Cristóbal Marqués Palliser (born 6 May 1984) is a Spanish politician serving as a member of the Senate since 2019. He is the secretary general of the People's Party in Menorca.
