= Isabel Moreno (politician, born 1984) =

Spanish politician (born 1984)

Member of the Senate
- Incumbent
- Assumed office 23 July 2023
- Constituency: Melilla

Personal details
- Born: 17 December 1984 (age 41)
- Party: People's Party

Isabel Moreno

Isabel María Moreno Mohamed (born 17 December 1984) is a Spanish politician serving as a member of the Senate since 2023. From 2015 to 2019, she served as deputy minister of women and youth of Melilla.
