= Raúl Valero =

Spanish politician (born 1990)

Member of the Senate
- Incumbent
- Assumed office 23 July 2023
- Constituency: Ciudad Real

Personal details
- Born: 29 August 1990 (age 35)
- Party: People's Party

Raúl Dalmacio Valero Mejía (born 29 August 1990) is a Spanish politician serving as a member of the Senate since 2023. From 2015 to 2023, he served as mayor of Montiel.
