= Juan Pablo Martín =

Spanish politician (born 1977)

Member of the Senate
- Incumbent
- Assumed office 21 May 2019
- Constituency: Ávila

Personal details
- Born: 23 December 1977 (age 48)
- Party: People's Party

Juan Pablo Martín Martín (born 23 December 1977) is a Spanish politician serving as a member of the Senate since 2019. He has served as mayor of Sotillo de la Adrada since 2011.
