= Amparo Marco =

Spanish politician

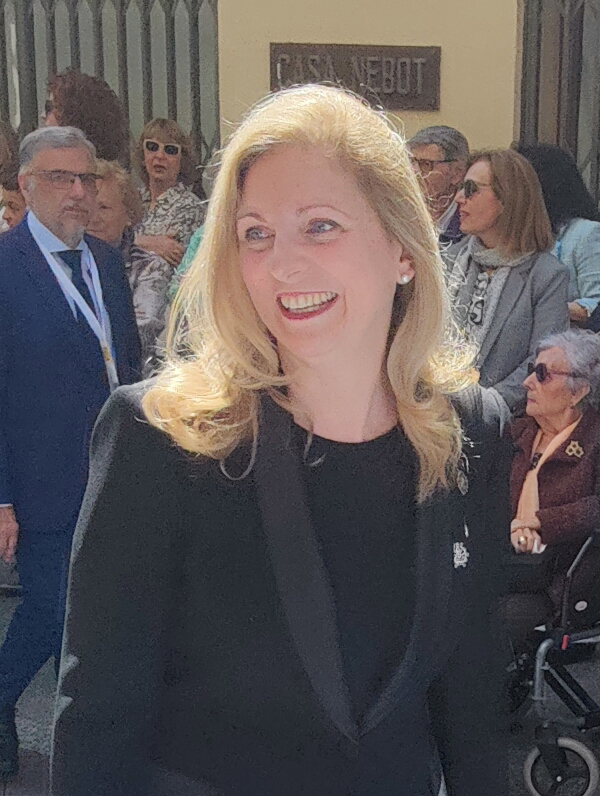

María Amparo Marco Gual (born 8 February 1968) is a Spanish economist and Spanish Socialist Workers' Party (PSOE) politician. She was a deputy in the Corts Valencianes (2003–2011), a city councillor (2007–2023) and mayor (2015–2023) of Castellón de la Plana, and was elected to the Senate of Spain in 2023.

== Biography ==
Marco was born in Castellón de la Plana. She graduated in economic and business sciences from the University of Valencia in 1992 and achieved a doctorate in business management and administration from the Jaume I University in 1998. She then became a professor in the Department of Finance and Accounting at the same university. She was still lecturing as of 2017, when she was mayor.

In the 2003 Valencian regional election, Marco was elected to the Corts Valencianes, where she remained until 2011. First elected to the city council in Castellón in 2007, she was elected at the end of 2014 as the Spanish Socialist Workers' Party (PSOE) candidate for mayor in 2015. In the election, her party won seven seats and the People's Party (PP) of incumbent Alfonso Bataller eight, but she was installed as the city's first woman mayor with the support of Coalició Compromís and Castelló en Moviment, while the PP abstained due to Bataller's implication in corruption. Four years later, the PSOE was the most voted party in the city for the first time since 1987 and she was re-elected, with the support of Compromís and a coalition led by Unidas Podemos.

Marco ran again for mayor in 2023. Her mandate ended, as Begoña Carrasco of the PP was invested mayor as leader of the most voted list (11 out of 27 seats). Soon after the local elections, a general election was called and Marco led the PSOE list in the Castellón constituency. As the third most-voted candidate, she took the PSOE's only seat from the four-seat constituency, with the others going to the PP.
