= Javier Lacalle =

Spanish politician

Francisco Javier Lacalle Lacalle
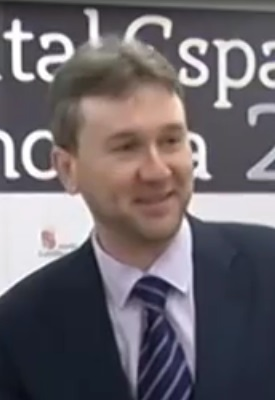

Senator at Cortes Generales
- In office 21 May 2019 – 29 May 2023

Mayor of Burgos
- In office 11 June 2011 – 15 June 2019

Personal details
- Born: 10 August 1969 (age 56) Burgos, Spain

Francisco Javier Lacalle Lacalle (born 10 August 1969 in Burgos, Spain) is a Spanish politician. He served as a senator of the 14th Senate of Spain. He had also served as the mayor of Burgos between 2011 till 2019.
