= Eva Patricia Bueno Campanario =

Spanish politician (born 1971)

Member of the Senate
- Incumbent
- Assumed office 23 July 2023
- Constituency: Seville

Member of the Congress of Deputies
- In office 21 May 2019 – 30 May 2023
- Constituency: Seville

Personal details
- Born: 29 May 1971 (age 54)
- Party: Spanish Socialist Workers' Party

Eva Patricia Bueno Campanario (born 29 May 1971) is a Spanish politician serving as a member of the Senate since 2023. From 2019 to 2023, she was a member of the Congress of Deputies.
