= Toni Magdaleno =

Spanish politician (born 1976)

Member of the Senate
- Incumbent
- Assumed office 21 May 2019
- Constituency: Navarre

Personal details
- Born: 10 October 1976 (age 49)
- Party: Spanish Socialist Workers' Party

Antonio Magdaleno Alegría (born 10 October 1976), better known as Toni Magdaleno, is a Spanish politician serving as a member of the Senate since 2019. From 1999 to 2003, he was a municipal councillor of Barañain.
