= María Eugenia Limón =

Spanish politician (born 1982)

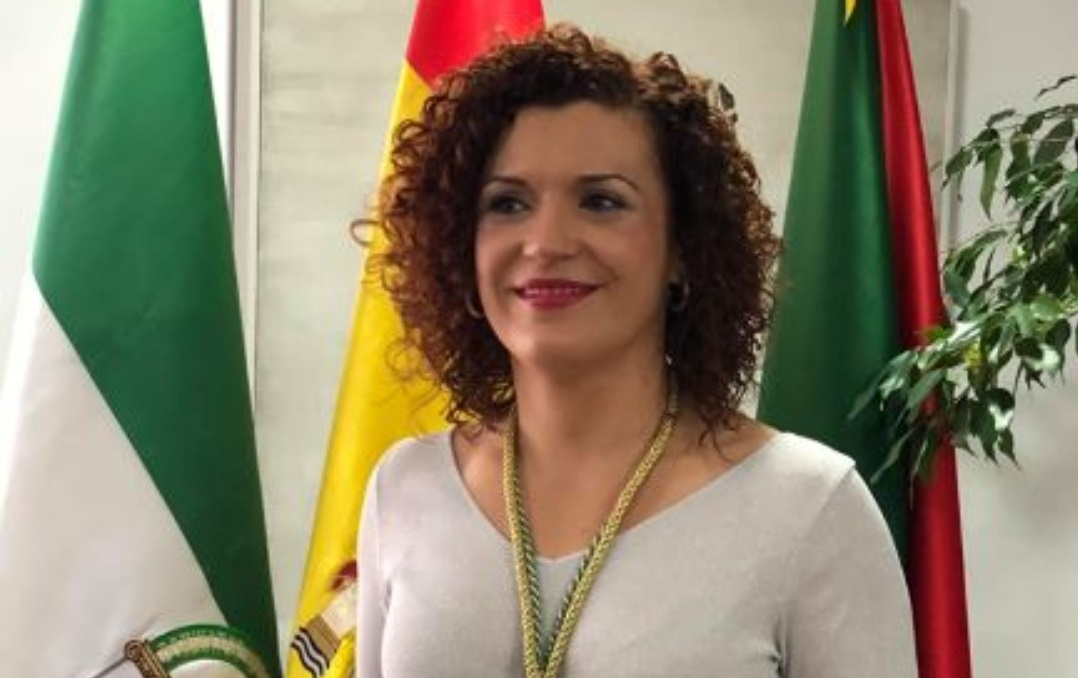
- Limón in 2020

Member of the Senate
- Incumbent
- Assumed office 23 July 2023
- Constituency: Huelva

Personal details
- Born: 27 August 1982 (age 43)
- Party: Spanish Socialist Workers' Party

María Eugenia Limón Bayo (born 27 August 1982) is a Spanish politician serving as a member of the Senate since 2023. She has served as mayor of San Bartolomé de la Torre since 2019. From 2020 to 2023, she served as president of the Provincial Deputation of Huelva.
