= Eva Martín Pérez =

Spanish politician (born 1971)

Member of the Senate
- Incumbent
- Assumed office 23 July 2023
- Constituency: Granada

Personal details
- Born: 10 July 1971 (age 54)
- Party: People's Party

María Eva Martín Pérez (born 10 July 1971) is a Spanish politician serving as a member of the Senate since 2023. From 2008 to 2018, she was a member of the Parliament of Andalusia.
