= Mónica Grados Caro =

Spanish politician (born 1980)

Member of the Senate
- Incumbent
- Assumed office 23 July 2023
- Constituency: Cáceres

Personal details
- Born: 13 December 1980 (age 45)
- Party: People's Party

Mónica Grados Caro (born 13 December 1980) is a Spanish politician serving as a member of the Senate since 2023. She is the mayor of Alcántara.
