= Lorena Guerra =

Spanish politician (born 1988)

Member of the Senate
- Incumbent
- Assumed office 23 July 2023
- Constituency: Córdoba

Personal details
- Born: 1 June 1988 (age 37)
- Party: People's Party

Lorena Guerra Sánchez (born 1 June 1988) is a Spanish politician serving as a member of the Senate since 2023. She is an agricultural engineer and influencer.
