= Cristina Casanueva =

Spanish politician (born 1985)

Member of the Senate
- Incumbent
- Assumed office 23 July 2023
- Constituency: Córdoba

Personal details
- Born: 4 March 1985 (age 41)
- Party: People's Party

Cristina Casanueva Jiménez (born 4 March 1985) is a Spanish politician serving as a member of the Senate since 2023. She has served as first deputy chairwoman of the committee on transport and sustainable mobility since 2023.
