= Zero Cuts =

Zero Cuts Recortes Cero
- Leader: Nuria Suárez
- Founded: 5 March 2014
- Registered: 8 June 2023
- Membership (2016): 3,741
- Ideology: Eco-socialism; Feminism; Anti-austerity
- Political position: Left-wing
- National affiliation: Broad Front (since 2026)
- Congress of Deputies: 0 / 350
- Senate: 0 / 266
- European Parliament: 0 / 61 (Spanish seats)

Website
- www.recortescero.es

Zero Cuts (Spanish: Recortes Cero) is a Spanish eco-socialist political party, initially founded as a group of electors, formed to contest the 2014 European Parliament election. Subsequently, it has contested the 2015 and 2016 general elections together with The Greens–Green Group. It is supported by the Communist Unification of Spain. In the 2019 Spanish general election, the filmmaker Fernando Colomo was the Madrid candidate to the Spanish Senate for the coalition Zero Cuts – The Greens – Castilian Party – Commoners' Land. His aim was to promote the list rather than becoming elected.

== Electoral performance ==
=== Cortes Generales ===
Election	Popular vote			Seats		Leader
Election	Votes	%	#	Congress	Senate	Leader
2015	48,675	0.2	#16	0 / 350	0 / 208	Nuria Suárez
2016	51,907	0.2	#11	0 / 350	0 / 208	Nuria Suárez
2019 (Apr.)	47,363	0.2	#17	0 / 350	0 / 208	Nuria Suárez
2019 (Nov.)	35,042	0.1	#17	0 / 350	0 / 208	Nuria Suárez
2023	23,421	0.1	#18	0 / 350	0 / 208	Nuria Suárez

=== European Parliament ===
Election	Popular vote			Seats	Candidate
Election	Votes	%	#	Seats	Candidate
2014	30,827	0.2	#20	0 / 54	Nuria Suárez
2019	50,002	0.2	#12	0 / 59	Nuria Suárez
2024	7,618	0.04	#26	0 / 61	Nuria Suárez
