= The Greens–Green Group =

The Greens–Green Group Los Verdes–Grupo Verde
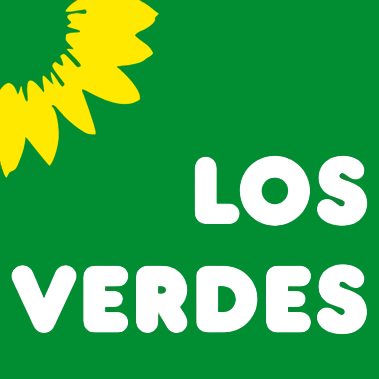
- Founded: April 1994
- Ideology: Green politics

Website
- www.los-verdes.es

The Greens–Green Group (Spanish: Los Verdes–Grupo Verde; LV–GV), founded in 1994 as Green Group (Spanish: Grupo Verde; GV), is a green political party in Spain. It is a founding member of the Roundtable for the Unity of the Greens in Spain. It was created as an electoral list in the 1994 European Parliamentary Elections. Since its creation, its spokesperson has been Esteban Cabal. It is not part of the European Green Party, and should not be confused with the EGP's previous representative in Spain, the Confederation of the Greens.

== History and evolution ==
The Greens–Green Group was created in 1994 when a group of people from the Spanish environmental movement decided to declare candidacy for the European Parliamentary Elections, in response to deep division within the Confederation of the Greens. Heading the list was Esteban Cabal, who had been elected city councilor in Rivas-Vaciamadrid in the municipal elections of 1991 in a coalition with the United Left and PSOE.

In 2006, The Greens–Green Group promoted the Green Unity Roundtable in an attempt to bring other green parties together. But in the end, it decided to present its own candidates, rather than establish electoral alliances.

On September 24, 2010, Los Verdes-Grupo Verde and the United Left announced an agreement to work on aligning their policies through the Refoundation of the Left. The agreement included the creation of a "working roundtable" to produce a New Political Program. The interests of environmental, feminist, and pacifist organizations would be represented in the roundtable. In 2012, the president of the LV-GV, Esteban Cabal, declared the breakdown of the agreements between his party and the United Left, branding them as delinquents.

In the 2019 Spanish general election, the filmmaker Fernando Colomo was the Madrid candidate to the Spanish Senate for the Zero Cuts – Green Group – Partido Castellano – Tierra Comunera coalition.

== See also ==
- Equo, another green party in Spain
