= Autovía A-42 =

Motorway in Spain

Autovía A-42
- Autovía de Toledo
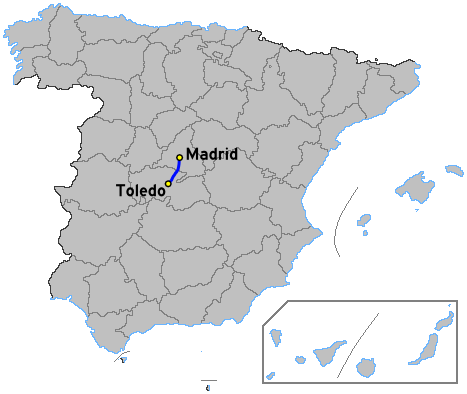

Route information
- Length: 78 km (48 mi)

Major junctions
- From: Madrid
- To: Toledo

Location
- Country: Spain

Highway system
- Highways in Spain; Autopistas and autovías; National Roads

The Autovía A-42 (also known as Autovía de Toledo) is a Spanish autovía which connects Madrid to Toledo. It was built in the mid-1980s as an upgrade of the N-401 road between the two cities, and received the A-42 designation in 2003 as part of the general renumbering of Spanish autovías.

In the mid-2000s, the Autopista AP-41 was built to supersede the A-42, though the autovía is still regularly used.

Beyond Toledo, the A-42 continues through the community of Castilla–La Mancha to Tomelloso as the CM-42, itself an upgrade of the CM-400.

== Project ==
On May 9, 2006, the City of Getafe signed an agreement with the Ministry of Public Works to move the road to make it pass through Getafe.

== Cities contiguous to Autovía A-42 ==
- Leganés
- Getafe
- Fuenlabrada
- Pinto
- Parla
- Valdemoro
- Torrejón de la Calzada
- Torrejón de Velasco
- Casarrubuelos
- Illescas
- Yuncos
- Numancia de la Sagra
- Yuncler
- Villaluenga de la Sagra
- Cabañas de la Sagra
- Olías del Rey
