= Alameda de la Sagra =

- Municipality
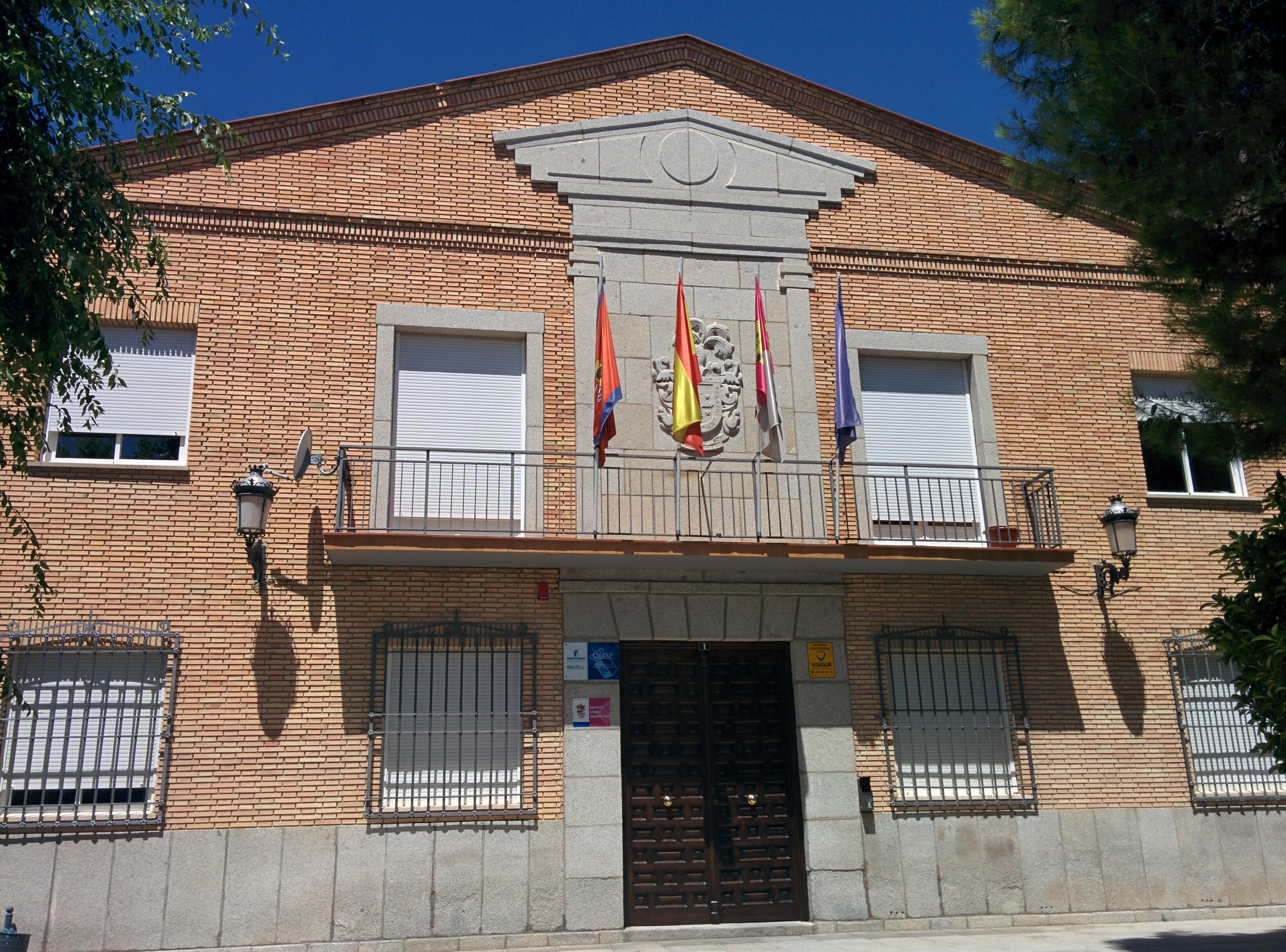
- Town Hall

- Flag Coat of arms

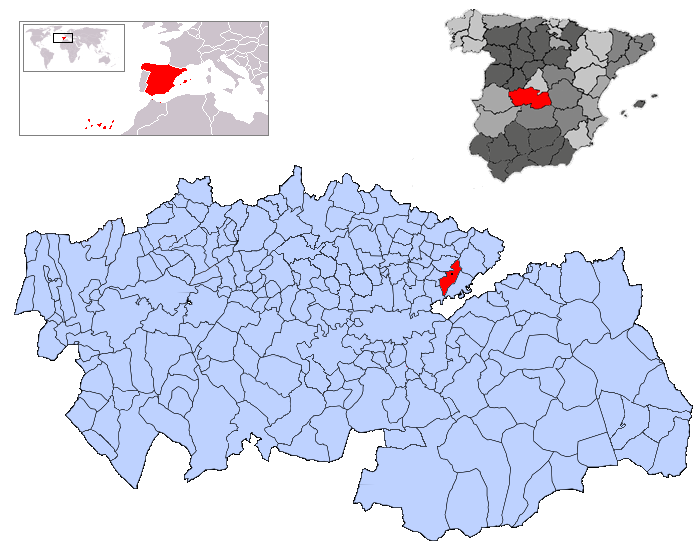

- Location in Spain
- Coordinates: 40°0′43″N 3°47′42″W
- Country: Spain
- Autonomous community: Castile-La Mancha
- Province: Toledo
- Comarca: La Sagra
- Judicial district: Illescas
- Founded: Ver texto

Government
  - Alcalde: Rafael Martín Arcicóllar (2007)

Area
  - Total: 33.03 km^{2} (12.75 sq mi)
- Elevation: 632 m (2,073 ft)

Population (2025-01-01)
  - Total: 4,350
  - Density: 132/km^{2} (341/sq mi)
- Demonyms: Alamedano, na Alamedo, da
- Time zone: UTC+1 (CET)
  - Summer (DST): UTC+2 (CEST)
- Postal code: 45240
- Dialing code: 925
- Website: Official website

Alameda de la Sagra is a municipality located in the province of Toledo, Castile-La Mancha, Spain. According to the 2008 census (INE), the municipality has a population of 3324 inhabitants.

== History ==
The municipality dates back to a colony established by plasterers from Cobeja who settled in the area in the 14th century due to its large gypsum deposits. The Church of Toledo owned the land since the 12th century, and permitted the settlement. Originally consisting of wooden shacks and farmhouses, the town gradually converted its structures into masonry starting in 1530.

== Geography ==
The municipality is located on a gypsum-rich plateau in the comarca of La Sagra. It abuts the municipalities of Borox, Añover de Tajo, Villaseca de la Sagra, Cobeja, and Pantoja. Its main water sources are the Tagus river and the Guadalén stream, both of which cross the municipality.

== Demographics ==
Historical population
Year	Pop.	±%
1900	1,151	—
1910	1,279	+11.1%
1920	1,396	+9.1%
1930	1,657	+18.7%
1940	1,575	−4.9%
1950	1,639	+4.1%
1960	1,816	+10.8%
1970	2,274	+25.2%
1981	2,611	+14.8%
1991	2,724	+4.3%
2001	2,841	+4.3%
2011	3,487	+22.7%
2021	3,757	+7.7%
2023	4,149	+10.4%
Source: INE
