= Illescas, Toledo =

Illescas
- Municipality
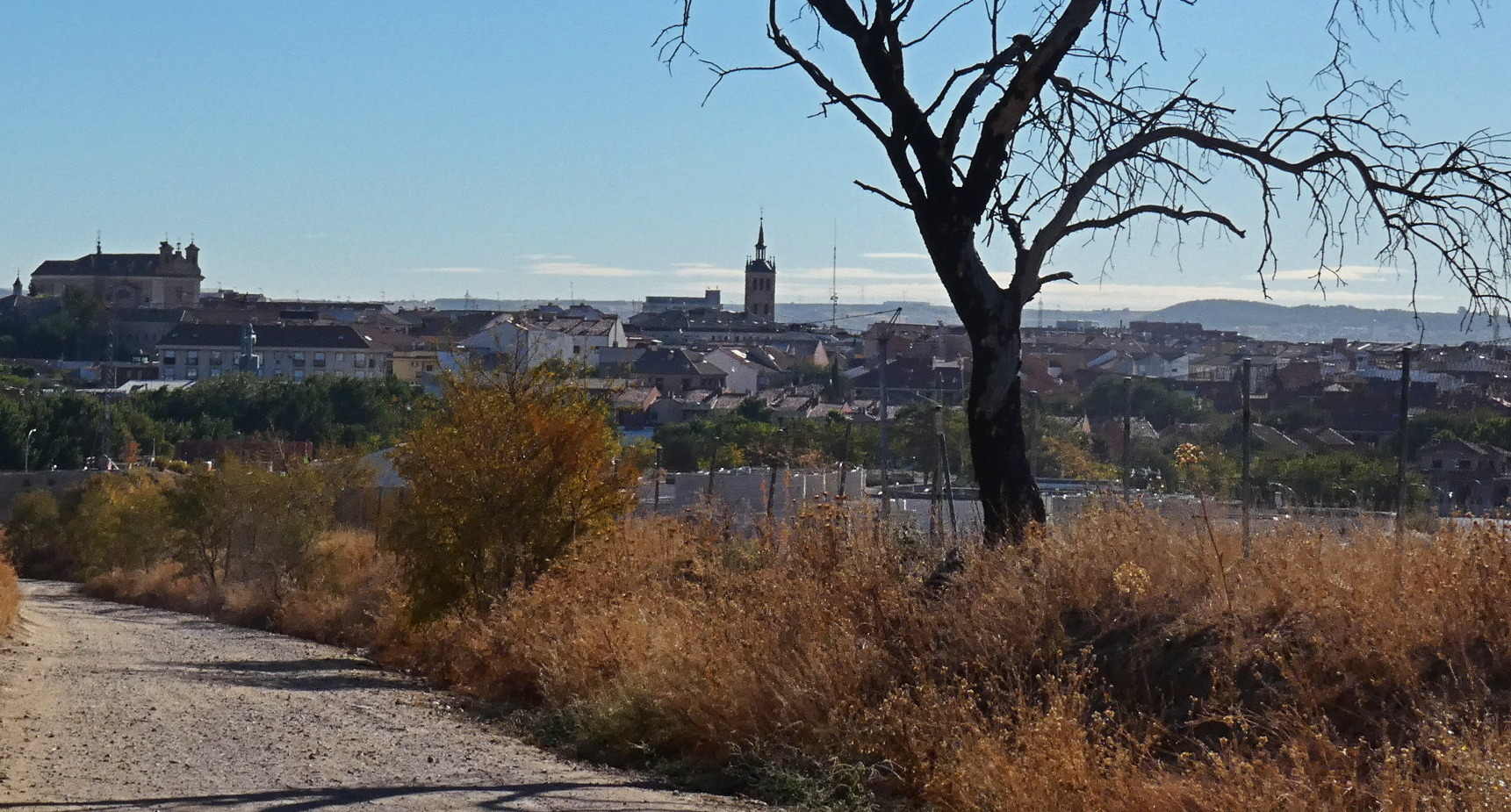

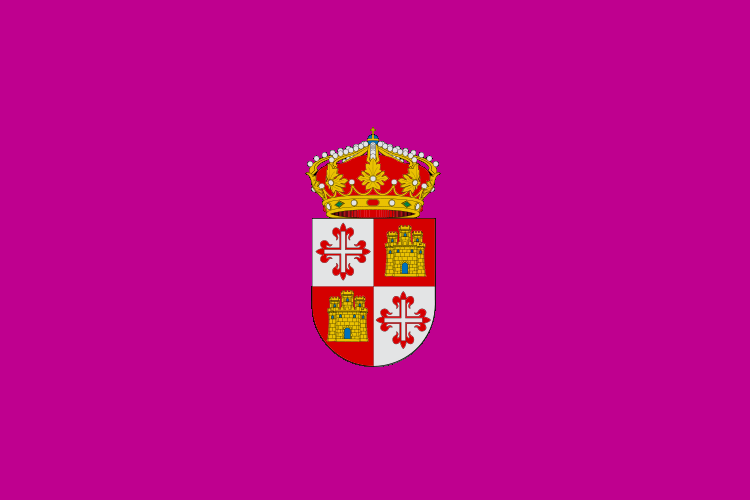
- Flag Coat of arms

- Location of Illescas within the Castile-La Mancha Illescas (Castilla-La Mancha)
- Coordinates: 40°07′N 3°50′W
- Country: Spain
- Autonomous community: Castilla–La Mancha
- Province: Toledo

Government
  - Mayor: José Manuel Tofiño

Area
  - Total: 56.75 km^{2} (21.91 sq mi)
- Elevation: 583 m (1,913 ft)

Population (2025-01-01)
  - Total: 33,301
  - Density: 586.8/km^{2} (1,520/sq mi)
- Time zone: UTC+1 (CET)
  - Summer (DST): UTC+2 (CEST)

Illescas is a town and municipality of Spain located in the province of Toledo, Castilla–La Mancha. The municipality spans across a total area of 56.75 km^{2} and, as of 1 January 2020, it has a registered population of 30,229, which makes it the third most populated municipality in the province. It belongs to the traditional comarca of La Sagra.

== Name ==
The first name reported in the middle ages was that of Elesches. Ensuing variations include Ilesches, Ilescas, Ailescas, Hilesques, Ylesches and Hylesques.

A tentative identification with Egelesta, mentioned in classical sources such as Ptolemy, has been proposed. It may be thus related to the Iberian-Basque 'egi-' ("hill line", "hillside"), whereas other authors relate Illescas to the proto-indoeuropean 'il' ("city").

== History ==
Placed within the municipal limits to the southwest of the town, El Cerrón archaeological site was a Carpetani settlement.

Illescas was acquired by Alfonso VII from the Bishop of Segovia in exchange of Aguilafuente and Bobadilla. A population charter was granted in 1154, bestowing a number of privileges to the Gascon settlers. It was effectively transferred to Archbishop Cerebruno in 1176, hereby becoming a seigneurial dominion of the Mitre of Toledo. In the 14th century, the inhabitants sought to free themselves from the ecclesiastical yoke, which was however confirmed by the Crown in 1329, although the monarch retained control over the morería and the judería. The town was sacked in 1441. By the 15th century, Illescas was a walled town that enjoyed an important marketplace and levied a gate tax (from which Madrilenians were exempted). It was incorporated to the Crown in May 1575, hereby becoming a realengo town ('royal demesne').

The town gained a railway link in 1876.

The town's population experienced a steady growth throughout the 20th century. (Note: 1728 (1900), 1758 (1910), 1853 (1920), 2091 (1930), 2168 (1940), 2129 (1950), 2560 (1960), 4246 (1970), 4854 (1975), 6054 (1981).) Population boomed in the first two decades of the 21st century, roughly increasing threefold. Thanks to the location, communications and available land, Illescas became a major logistics centre in Spain by the early 21st century.

== Geography ==
The town is located on a plain between Madrid and Toledo. It belongs to the region of La Sagra and to the north borders with Casarrubuelos, Cubas de la Sagra, Torrejón de la Calzada and Torrejón de Velasco. To the east it borders with Yeles and the house of Campsota. To the south it borders with Numancia de la Sagra and to the west it borders with Cedillo del Condado, El Viso de San Juan, Ugena, Carranque and the west of Toledo.

== Monuments ==
- Arco de Ugena is the remaining fragment of the old Puerta de Ugena, a door made of wood in the Mudéjar style. The wall had five doors and the Arco de Ugena is the last one standing. It is thought to have been built in the 11th century, when Alfonso VI wanted to wall the village.
- Convento de la Concepción de la Madre de Dios was built in 1514 by Cardinal Cisneros. The first mother superior, Inés de la Concepción, was Cardinal Cisneros's cousin.
- Hospital Nuestra Señora de la Caridad was built between the 16th and 17th centuries.
- Santuario de Nuestra Señora de la Caridad was built in 1500. It hosts five paintings by El Greco: Saint Ildefonsus and four of the five painted for its high altarpiece (Charity, Coronation of the Virgin, Nativity and Annunciation).
- Iglesia parroquial and Torre Mudéjar; in 1920 this was declared a national monument.
- Calle Real is a densely populated main street.
- Plaza de las Cadenas is located in front of the Iglesia de la Caridad, next to the ent.
- Olmo del Milagro is a 500-year-old elm.
