= El Ferial =

- Location: Parla, Spain
- Coordinates: 40°14′29″N 3°45′20″W
- Opened: April 25, 1995
- Num. of stores: 60
- Website: www.elferial.es

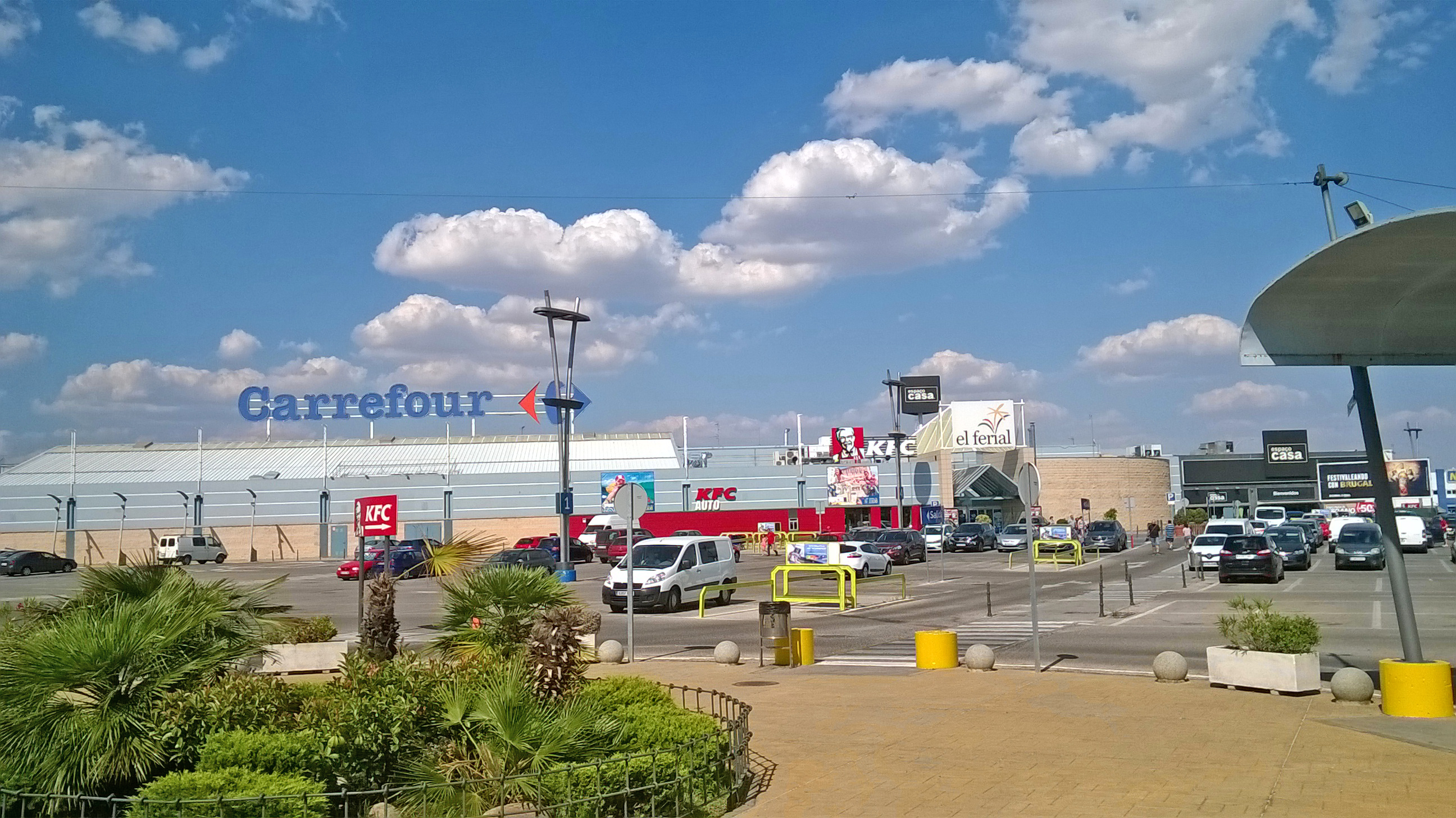
C.C El Ferial

El Ferial is a shopping center located in the Madrid town of Parla, in Spain, opened in 1995. It has an area of 30,000 m2 built among them more than 60 commercial premises, and 1700 free parking spaces.
