= The Apparition of the Virgin to Saint Hyacinth =

Painting by El Greco

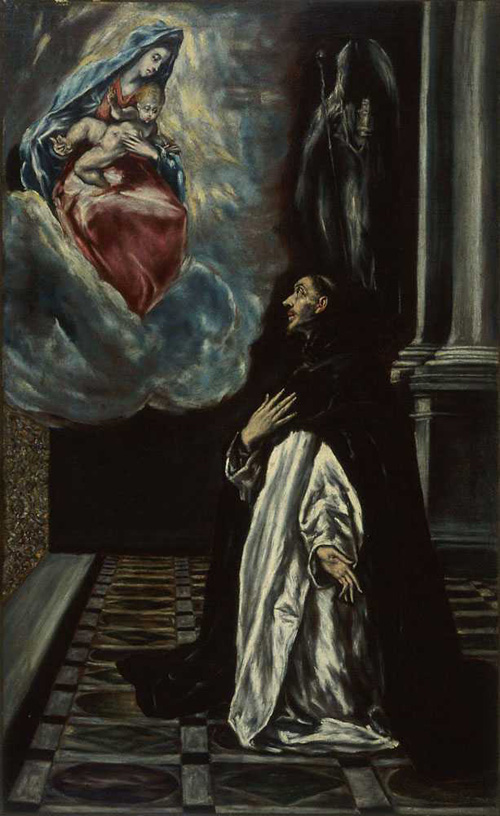
- Artist: El Greco
- Year: c. 1605–1610
- Medium: Oil on canvas
- Movement: Baroque
- Dimensions: 100 cm × 61.9 cm (39 in × 24.4 in)
- Location: Memorial Art Gallery, Rochester, New York
- Accession: 1938.28

The Apparition of the Virgin to Saint Hyacinth is an oil painting on canvas by El Greco, dated to between 1605 and 1610. The late-period painting shows the vision of the Virgin and Child before Saint Hyacinth of Poland on the feast day marking the Assumption. This painting belonging to the Memorial Art Gallery in Rochester, New York, is one of two paintings which depict this scene. The other version, a larger painting (158.4 × 98.7 cm (62 3/8 × 38 7/8 in)), belongs to the Barnes Foundation in Philadelphia, Pennsylvania.

== Origins ==
The Apparition maintains a consistent record in the inventory of El Greco's possessions at his death in 1614 to the transfer of Jorge Manuel Theotocópuli's possession in 1621. Both the large version in the Barnes Foundation and the smaller Memorial Art Gallery version are recorded in these inventories. In the 1614 inventory, "grande" or 'large' distinguishes the two while in the 1621 inventory these paintings are further described with dimensions indicating their differences in scale. Although Fernando Marías makes an explicit reference to The Apparition of the Virgin to Saint Hyacinth as a markedly specific type of painting, that it "would be painted on demand for particular clients", and that other numerously copied works were available on a walk-in basis for customers in the Toledo workshop, the presence of both versions in El Greco's possession suggests they may have never left the workshop. Other paintings such as portraits or double portraits of saints would be painted and displayed on-sale in the studio, while more complex subjects like visions or apparitions were bespoke jobs.

Apparition of the Virgin and Child to Saint Hyacinth, by El Greco, c. 1605–1610, Oil on canvas, 62 3/8 × 38 7/8 in. (158.4 × 98.7 cm). Barnes Foundation.

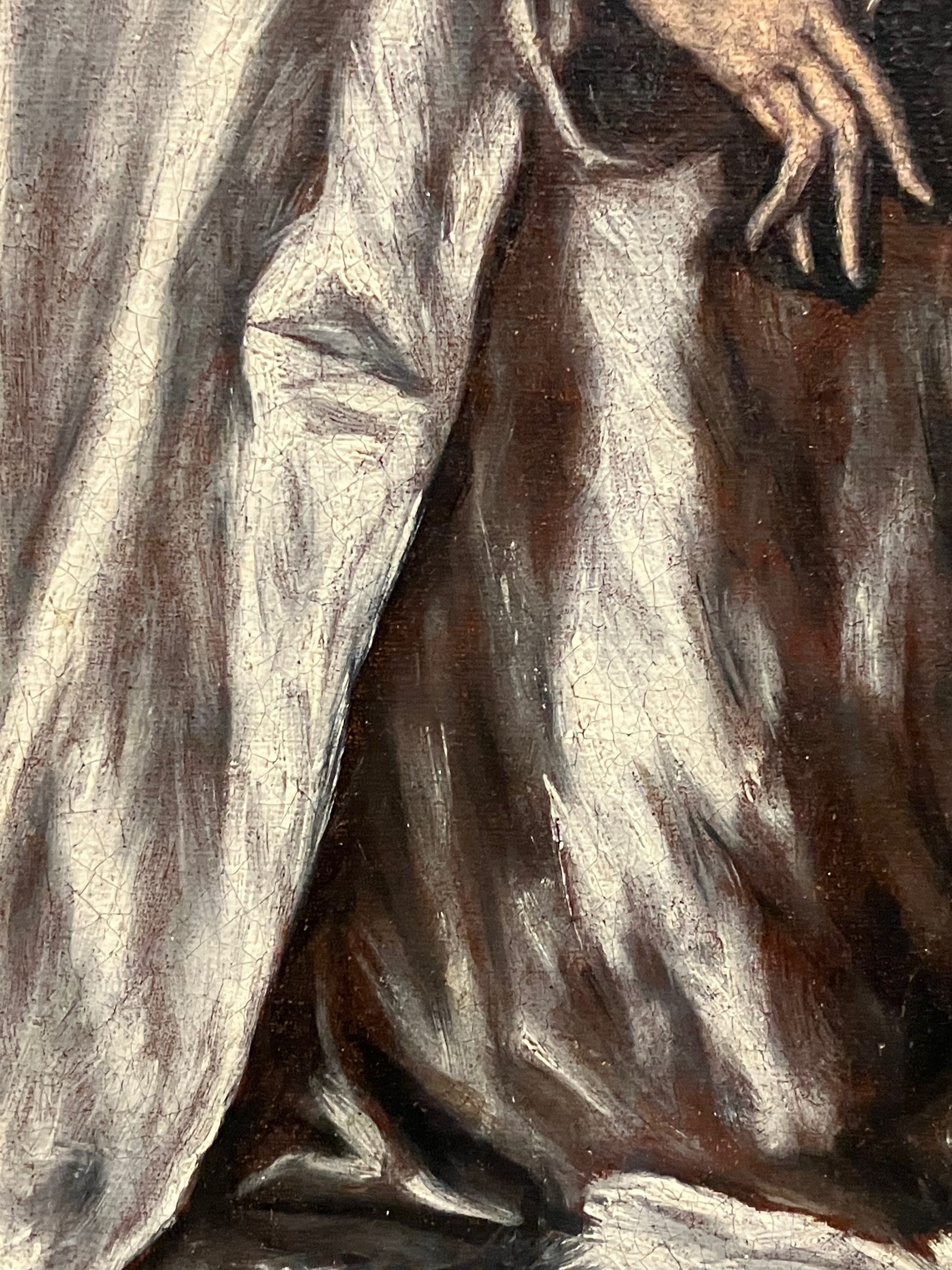
White fabric detail, MAG version

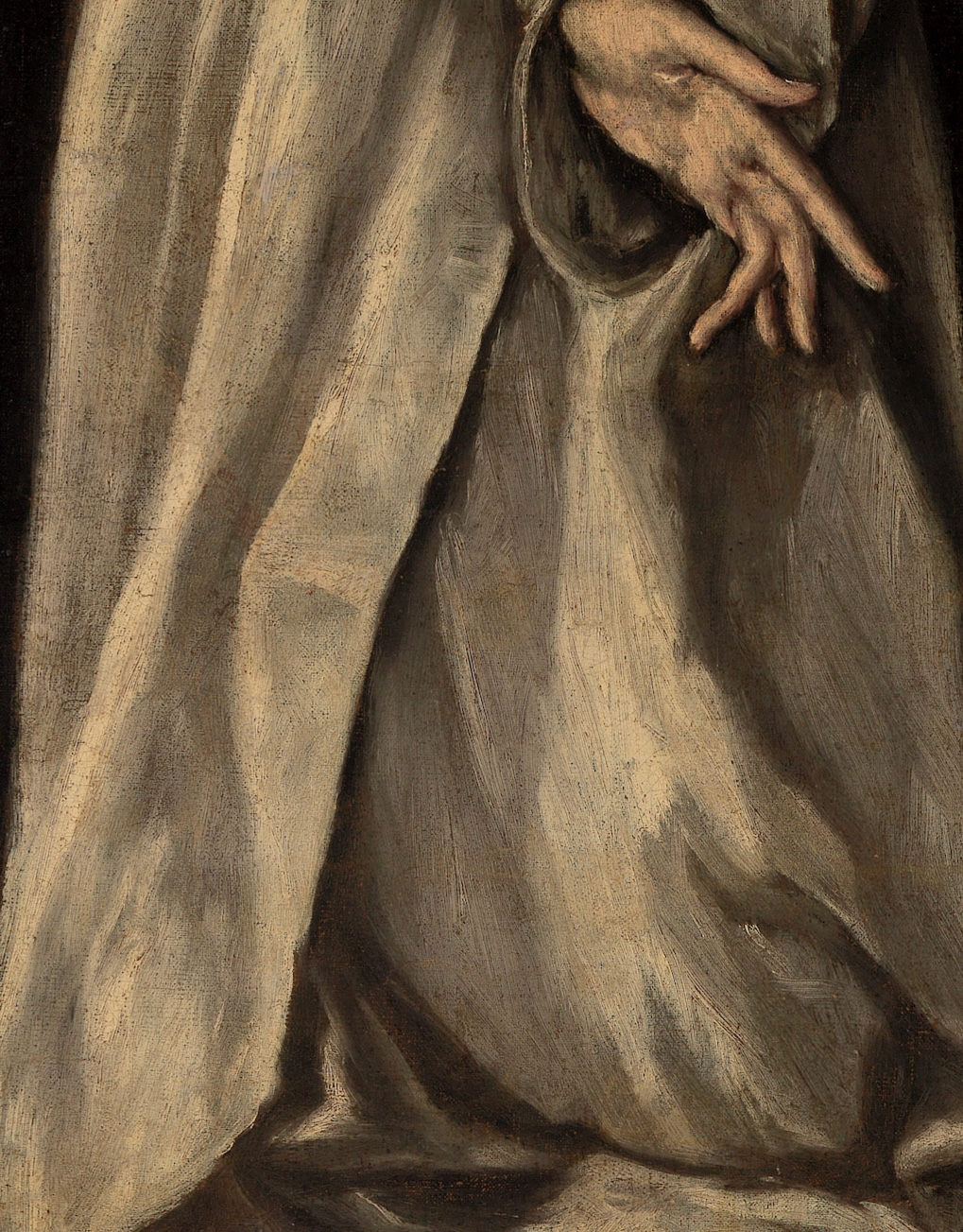
White fabric detail, BF version

== Technique ==
The Apparition is rendered in a much rougher manner than its Barnes Foundation counterpart. Prepared on a dark reddish-orange ground, the majority of the composition is painted in a cursory manner directly above the ground without intending to conceal the ground itself. This reddish-orange paint shows throughout numerous sections such as the lead white paint applied to Saint Hyacinth's habit. Instead of covering the ground and building the values afterwards as is evident in the large-scale version, the values are directly informed by the ground which shows clearly through the direct applications of lead white and chromatic grays. El Greco is not estranged to utilizing the underlayers of a painting for effect. In the portrait of Diego de Covarrubias y Leiva, El Greco directly applies lead white paint to the support while letting the bare canvas inform the values of the fabric. Note that this section is not coated by a similar ground which he employed in his portraiture. In other sections such as the cloud formation around the Virgin and Child, lightly valued ultramarine layers over lead white paint. Circumscribing the clouds, the ground reveals itself again, especially at the border between the cloud and the niche in the background. To compare the two paintings once more, these areas of ground are completely covered in the large-scale painting. The exposure of the ground, in paintings composed of skies and clouds in particular, is prominent in large scale works like the Laocoön, Our Lady of Charity, and The Annunciation which all feature red grounds; Saint Martin and the Beggar also utilizes the ground, albeit in a blueish silver color.

== See also ==
- List of works by El Greco
