= Cobeja =

Coordinates: 40°01′N 3°51′W

- municipality
- Coat of arms

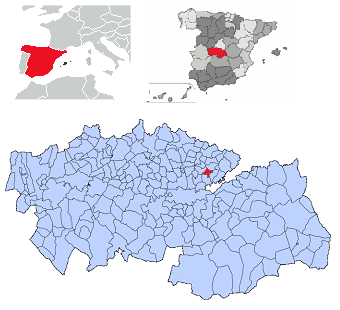
- Country: Spain
- Autonomous community: Castile-La Mancha
- Province: Toledo

Area
  - Total: 17.37 km^{2} (6.71 sq mi)
- Elevation: 504 m (1,654 ft)

Population (2025-01-01)
  - Total: 2,719
  - Density: 156.5/km^{2} (405.4/sq mi)
- Time zone: UTC+1 (CET)
  - Summer (DST): UTC+2 (CEST)

Cobeja is a municipality located in the province of Toledo, Castile-La Mancha, Spain. According to the 2006 census (INE), the municipality has a population of 2047 inhabitants.

== History ==
Alfonso VI gave the population of Cubeixa in 1086, along with other territories to the church Santa Maria de Toledo, following the recapture of the city. Was repopulated in 1155 with 18 inhabitants, and in 1159, the council of Toledo donates three quarters of the village of Alameda at the end of Cobeja.

In the list of rents received in 1232 the Cathedral of Toledo is mentioned Couexa. The reviews that appear in the Mozarabic documents of the time there is the difficulty of distinguishing Cobeja of Cobisa because Arabic is written in the same way.

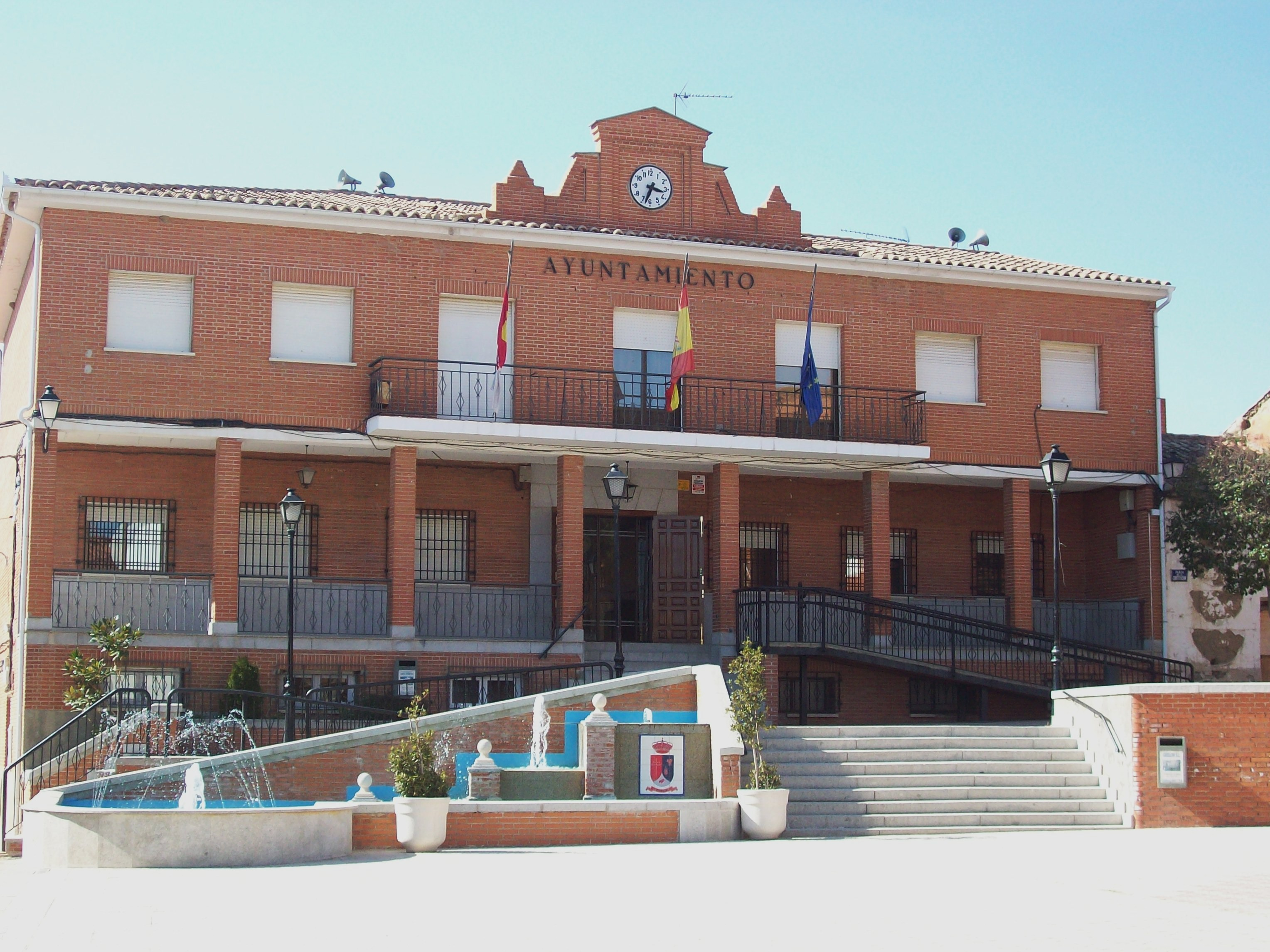
Town Hall of Cobeja.

== Location ==
The town is situated on a plain of the county of La Sagra and adjoining populations Pantoja, Alameda de la Sagra, Villaseca de la Sagra and Villaluenga de la Sagra, all of Toledo.

== Administration ==
List of mayors since the democratic elections of 1979

Period
Mayor
Party
1979–1983
Longinos Díaz Herrando
UCD
1983–1987
Miguel Núñez Viso
AP/PDP/UL
1987–1991
Antonio Largo Rodríguez
PSOE
1991–1995
Antonio Largo Rodríguez
PSOE
1995–1999
Antonio Largo Rodríguez
PSOE
1999–2003
Antonio Largo Rodríguez (11 May 2000)

Francisco Núñez Núñez

PSOE
2003–2007
Antonio Fernández Redondo
PP
2007–2011
Antonio Fernández Redondo
PP

== Demography ==
The following table shows the evolution of population between 1996 and 2006 according to data from the Instituto Nacional de Estadística (INE).

Year	1996	1998	1999	2000	2001	2002	2003	2004	2005	2006
Inhabitants	1736	1749	1790	1804	1812	1859	1929	1986	1994	2047

== Monuments ==
To highlight the Church of San Juan Bautista and the water source, dating from 1702

== Festivities ==
- 20 January: Saint Sebastian
- Third weekend of September: Festivities in honor of the Virgen del Carmen
