= Parla =

- Municipality
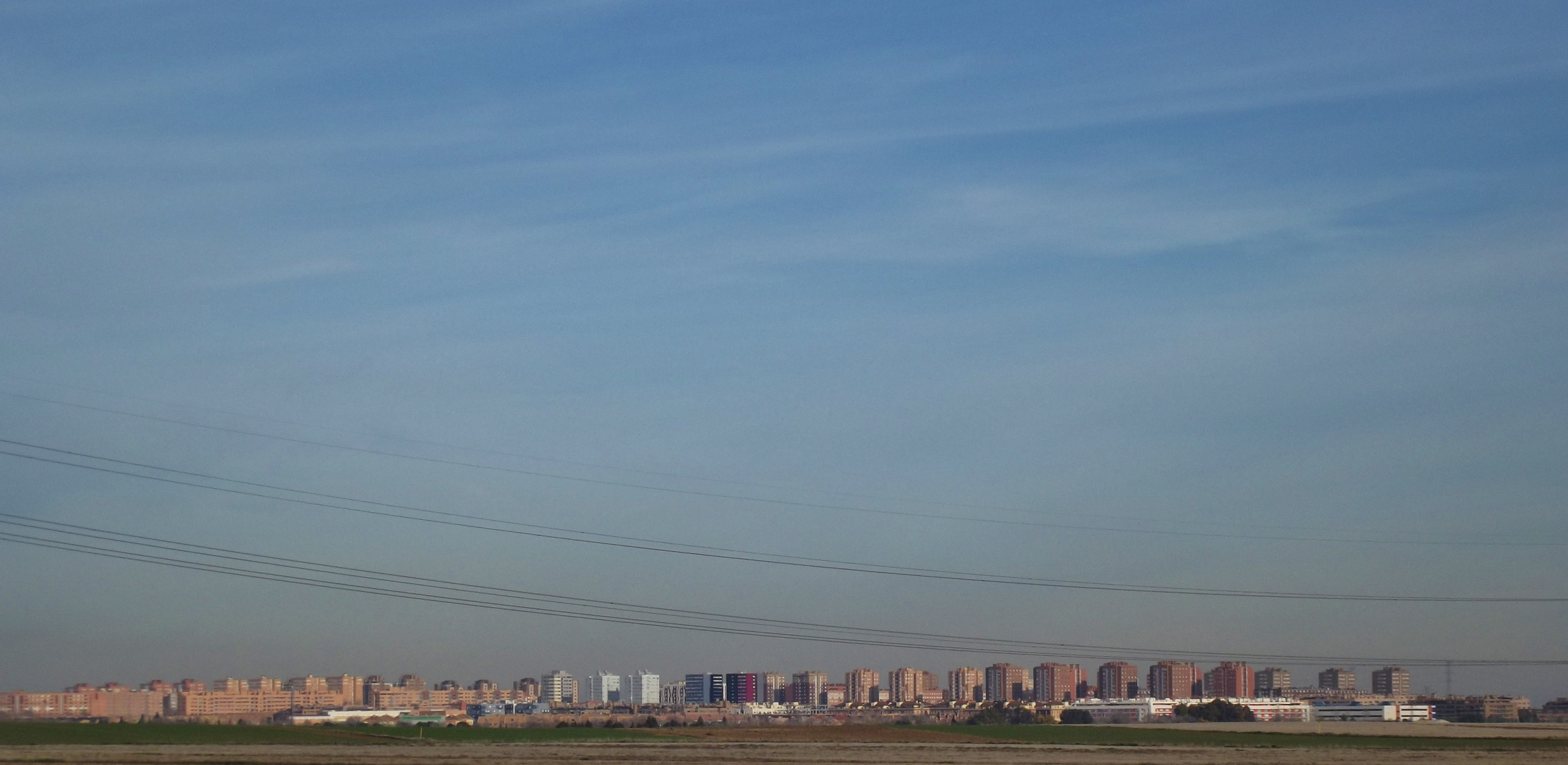
- Skyline of Parla

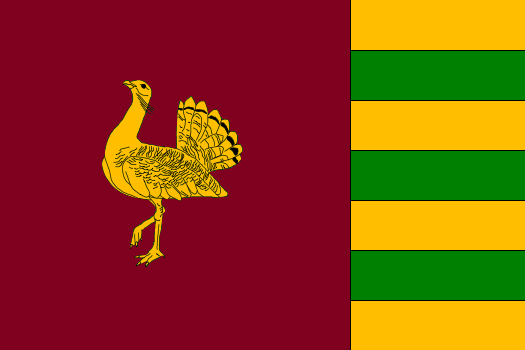
- Flag Coat of arms
- Location of Parla
- Coordinates: 40°14′14″N 3°46′27″W
- Country: Spain
- Autonomous community: Community of Madrid

Government
  - Type: Ayuntamiento
  - Body: Ayuntamiento de Parla
  - Mayor: Ramón Jurado (PSOE)

Area
  - Total: 24.43 km^{2} (9.43 sq mi)
- Elevation: 648.5 m (2,128 ft)

Population (2025-01-01)
  - Total: 137,471
  - Density: 5,627/km^{2} (14,570/sq mi)
- Demonyms: Parleño (masc.); parleña (fem.)
- Time zone: UTC+1 (CET)
  - Summer (DST): UTC+2 (CEST)
- Postal code: 28980–28984
- Website: Official website

Parla (Spanish pronunciation: [ˈpaɾ.la]) is a municipality in the Community of Madrid, Spain. Part of the Madrid metropolitan area, it is located in the southern part of the region.

== Geography ==
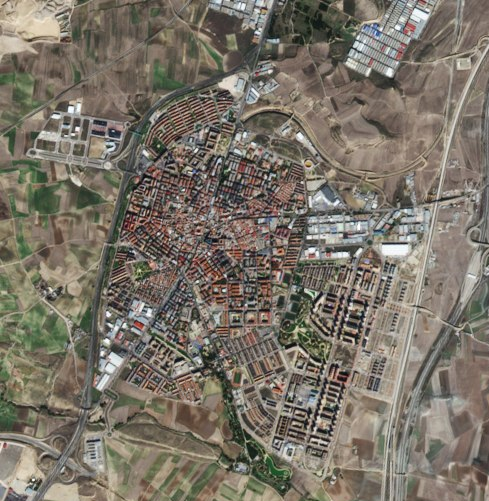
Parla as seen by the European Space Agency's Sentinel-2.

The municipality of Parla covers an area of 24.43 km^{2}.

The municipality largely features a monotonous flat relief. The Cerro de La Cantueña (the municipality's highest point at 684 m), the cerro del Pico (654 m), and the cerro de los Cantos (635 m) are the only noteworthy hills.

Housing is sandwiched west, south and east respectively by the A-42, by the Arroyo Guatén watercourse, and by the R-4 and the high-speed railways from Madrid to Levante and to Seville. The non-urbanised north of the municipality, featuring the Cerro de la Cantueña hill, borders with the industrial estate of Cobo Calleja in Fuenlabrada.

It borders six municipalities of the community of Madrid: Fuenlabrada to the North; Torrejón de Velasco and Torrejón de la Calzada to the South; Pinto to the East; and Griñón and Humanes de Madrid to the West.

Its elevation is 648.5 meters above sea level.

== History ==
The Cerro de la Cantueña attests occupation of the territory in the Lower Paleolithic. The Cerro de la Iglesia site, in Humanejos, also features a prehistoric chronology.

Presumably settled by Madrid's council militias, Parla (similarly as neighbouring Humanejos) was a hamlet attached to the sexmo of Villaverde, part of the land of Madrid, in the middle ages prior to its segregation into a seigneurial lordship. On a privilege issued on 6 January 1338, the monarchy ceded control of the hamlet of "Parlas" to the cardinal Pedro Barroso as a payment for services rendered. This document was later affirmed in 1351. In such, the settlement was a lordship up until the 19th century. Humanejos fully depopulated by the late 17th century.

After the Peninsular War, Parla became home to a large number of refugees from other localities.

== Politics and government ==
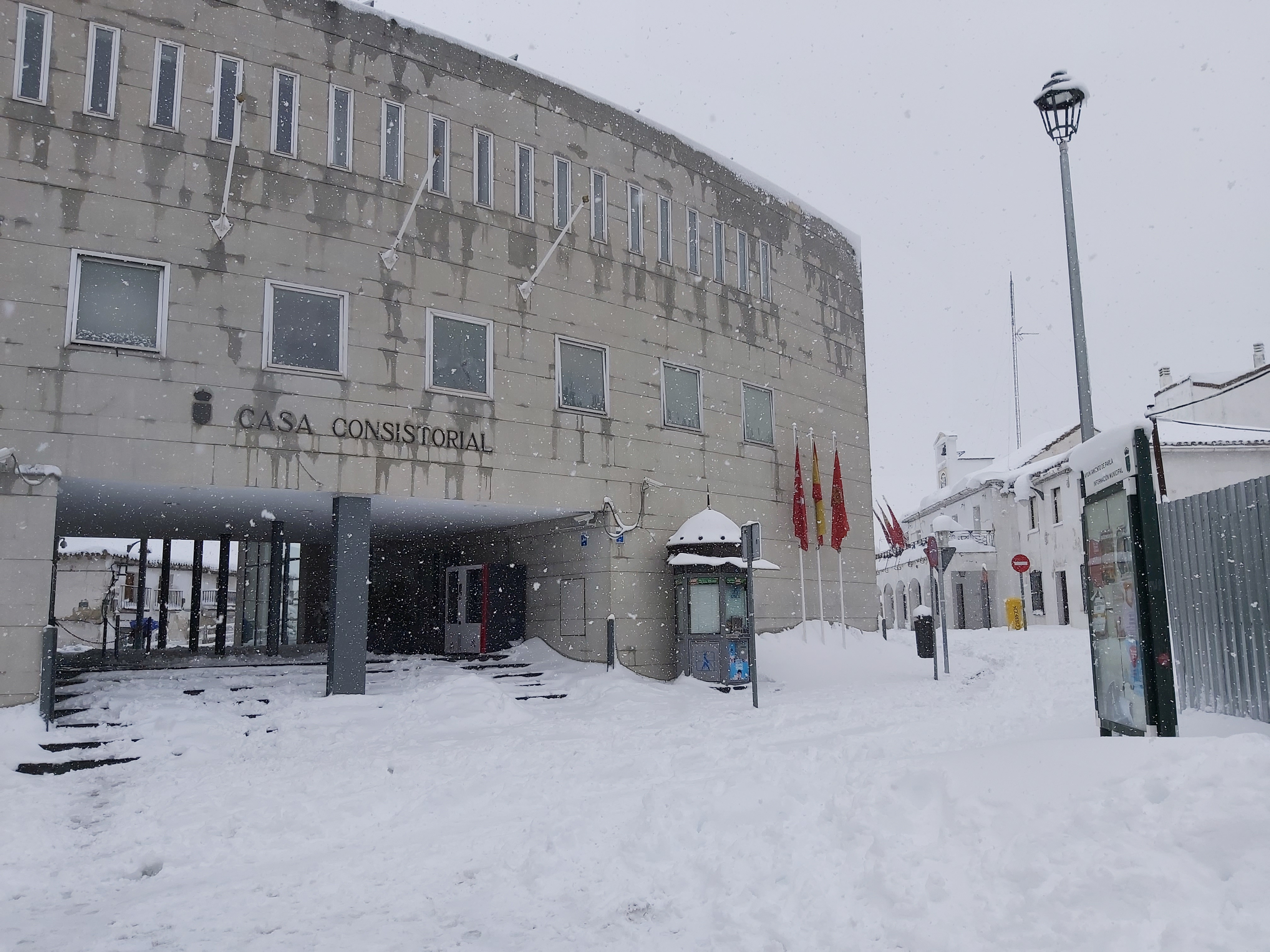
Parla town hall

The current mayor is José María Fraile (PSOE), who was elected in 2008. The previous mayor, Tomás Gómez Franco, resigned from his post in October 2008 to accept the position of secretary general of the PSOE.

The majority of local politics involves three of the major political parties: the Spanish Socialist Workers' Party (PSOE), the Popular Party (PP), and the United Left (IU).

During the 2007 Spanish regional elections, the PSOE carried 74.43% of the vote and retained 20 town councillors. In comparison, the People's Party carried only 16.61% of the vote (4 councillors), while the IU carried 6.15% (1 councillor). The other political parties were unable to obtain sufficient votes to gain representation on the town council.

Local elections take place every four years, and are held in conjunction with the autonomous elections of the Community of Madrid. The next elections will take place in the year 2011.

The local government is divided into the following departments (called concejalía):

- Concejalía de Presidencia
- Concejalía de Hacienda y Patrimonio
- Concejalía de Seguridad Ciudadana
- Concejalía de Recursos Humanos
- Concejalía de Servicios Sociales
- Concejalía de Mujer
- Concejalía de Infancia
- Concejalía de Tercera Edad
- Concejalía de Cooperación Internacional
- Concejalía de Áreas Territoriales
- Concejalía de Obras

- Concejalía de Medio Ambiente
- Concejalía de Transportes
- Concejalía de Planificación Urbanística y Desarrollo Industrial y Local
- Concejalía de Empleo y Formación
- Concejalía de Consumo, Comercio y Actividades
- Concejalía de Juventud
- Concejalía de Educación
- Concejalía de Deportes
- Concejalía de Cultura
- Concejalía de Sanidad
- Concejalía de Servicios Generales

== Demographics ==
Historical population
Year	Pop.	±%
1842	1,097	—
1857	1,016	−7.4%
1877	1,077	+6.0%
1887	1,088	+1.0%
1900	1,306	+20.0%
1910	1,391	+6.5%
1920	1,306	−6.1%
1930	1,374	+5.2%
1940	1,071	−22.1%
1950	1,312	+22.5%
1960	1,809	+37.9%
1970	10,317	+470.3%
1981	56,318	+445.9%
1991	69,907	+24.1%
2001	79,213	+13.3%
2011	122,045	+54.1%
2021	130,550	+7.0%
Source: INE

At the beginning of the 20th century, Parla had a population of 1,237. The municipality then underwent a population explosion, until reaching its current population of 150,000 (INE 2008).

The majority of population growth occurred during the late 1960s due to the major urban migration that was occurring in Spain at the time. Between 1960 and 1970, the population grew 470%, from 1,809 inhabitants to 10,317. This migration continued at an elevated rate during the 1970s, as people from Castilla-La Mancha, Andalusia and Extremadura settled in the area in order to commute to Madrid.

Starting in 1996, Parla once more began to experience a noticeable population growth, this time due to immigration from Algeria, Morocco, Romania, Poland, and sub-Saharan Africa. This trend continues today.

== People ==
- Javier Castillejo, boxer
- Juan José Ballesta, actor
- Cristina Sánchez, former bullfighter
- Rafael "Rafa" Benítez, football coach
- Iván Calero, football player
- Javier Camuñas Gallego, football player
- Javier Muñoz, football player
- José Ignacio Zahínos, football player
- Borja Mayoral, football player

== Twin towns ==
- Callosa de Segura, Spain
- Valladolid, Spain
- Funchal, Portugal
- Badalona, Spain
