= Marriage of the Virgin (El Greco) =

Painting by El Greco

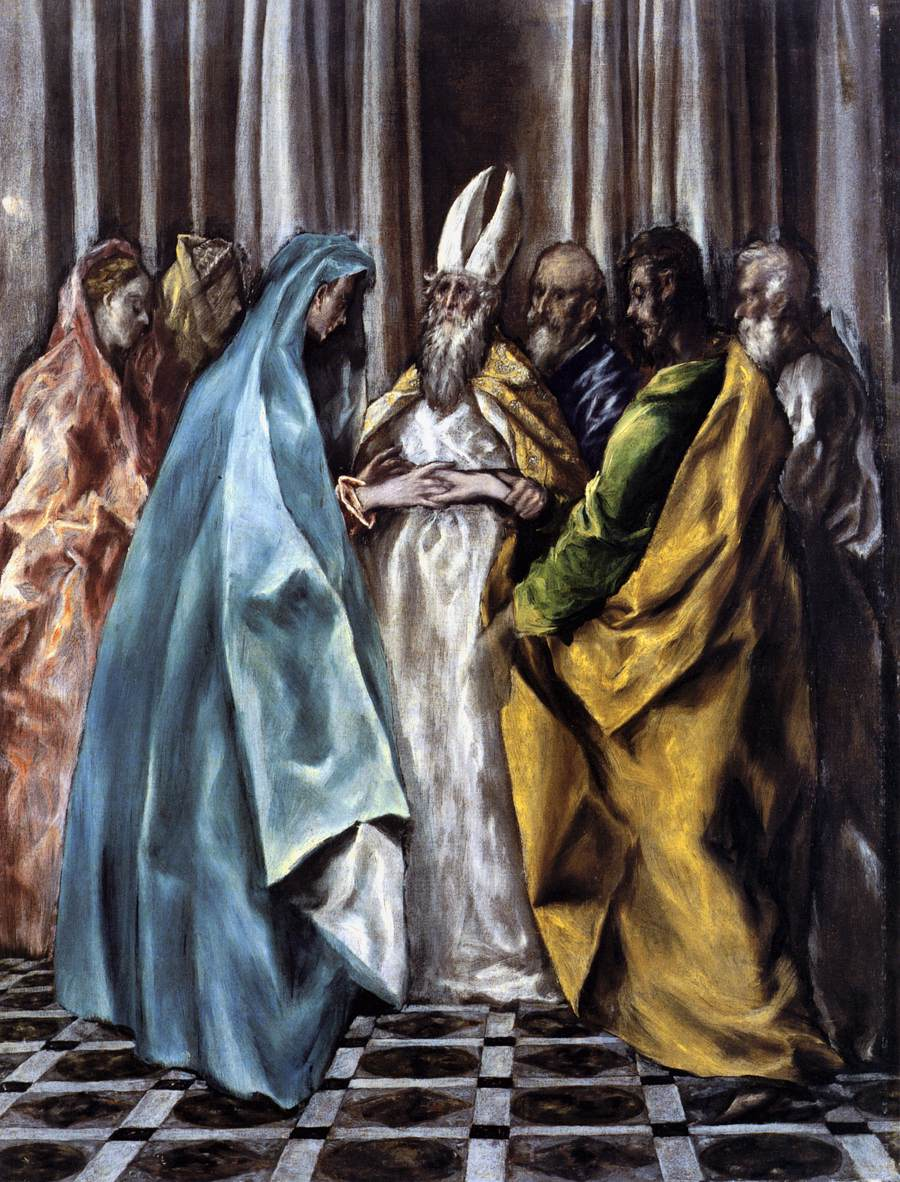
- Artist: El Greco
- Medium: oil on canvas
- Dimensions: 110 cm × 83 cm (43 in × 33 in)
- Location: National Museum of Art of Romania, Bucharest

Marriage of the Virgin is a 1603-1605 painting by El Greco, now in the National Museum of Art of Romania. Showing the Marriage of the Virgin, it was one of five produced for the high altarpiece of the Santuario de Nuestra Señora de la Caridad in the Spanish town of Illescas, Toledo. The other four works all still hang in the Santuario (The Virgin of Charity, Annunciation, Coronation of the Virgin and Nativity).

== See also ==
- List of works by El Greco

== Sources ==
- https://www.wga.hu/html/g/greco_el/21/2107grec.html
