= CD Cobeja =

Spanish football team

Cobeja
- Full name: Club Deportivo Cobeja
- Founded: 1980
- Dissolved: 2016
- Ground: Pedro Galán, Cobeja, Castilla-La Mancha, Spain
- Capacity: 2,000
- 2015–16: Primera Autonómica – Group 4, 16th of 16
Home colours	Away colours

Club Deportivo Cobeja was a football team based in Cobeja in the autonomous community of Castilla-La Mancha.

== History ==
CD Cobeja was founded in 1980. The club was dissolved before the 2010–11 season. Back to an active status in 2012, the club again ceased activities in 2016.

== Season to season ==
Season	Tier	Division	Place	Copa del Rey
1980–81	9	3ª Reg.	(R)	
1981–82	DNP			
1982–83	DNP			
1983–84	DNP			
1984–85	9	3ª Reg.	4th	
1985–86	9	3ª Reg.	3rd	
1986–87	7	2ª Reg.	7th	
1987–88	7	2ª Reg.	16th	
1988–89	7	2ª Reg.	11th	
1989–90	7	2ª Reg.	15th	
1990–91	7	2ª Reg.	7th	
1991–92	7	2ª Reg.	1st	
1992–93	6	1ª Reg.	11th	
1993–94	6	1ª Reg.	16th	
1994–95	6	1ª Reg.	7th	
1995–96	6	2ª Aut.	2nd	
1996–97	6	2ª Aut.	1st	
1997–98	6	2ª Aut.	1st	

Season	Tier	Division	Place	Copa del Rey
1998–99	5	1ª Aut.	13th	
1999–2000	5	1ª Aut.	4th	
2000–01	5	1ª Aut.	7th	
2001–02	5	1ª Aut.	2nd	
2002–03	5	1ª Aut.	11th	
2003–04	5	1ª Aut.	7th	
2004–05	5	1ª Aut.	9th	
2005–06	5	1ª Aut.	2nd	
2006–07	5	1ª Aut.	2nd	
2007–08	4	3ª	20th	
2008–09	5	Aut. Pref.	10th	
2009–10	5	Aut. Pref.	8th	
2010–11	DNP			
2011–12	DNP			
2012–13	7	2ª Aut.	4th	
2013–14	6	1ª Aut.	10th	
2014–15	6	1ª Aut.	10th	
2015–16	6	1ª Aut.	16th	

- 1 seasons in Tercera División
