= Nativity (El Greco) =

Painting by El Greco

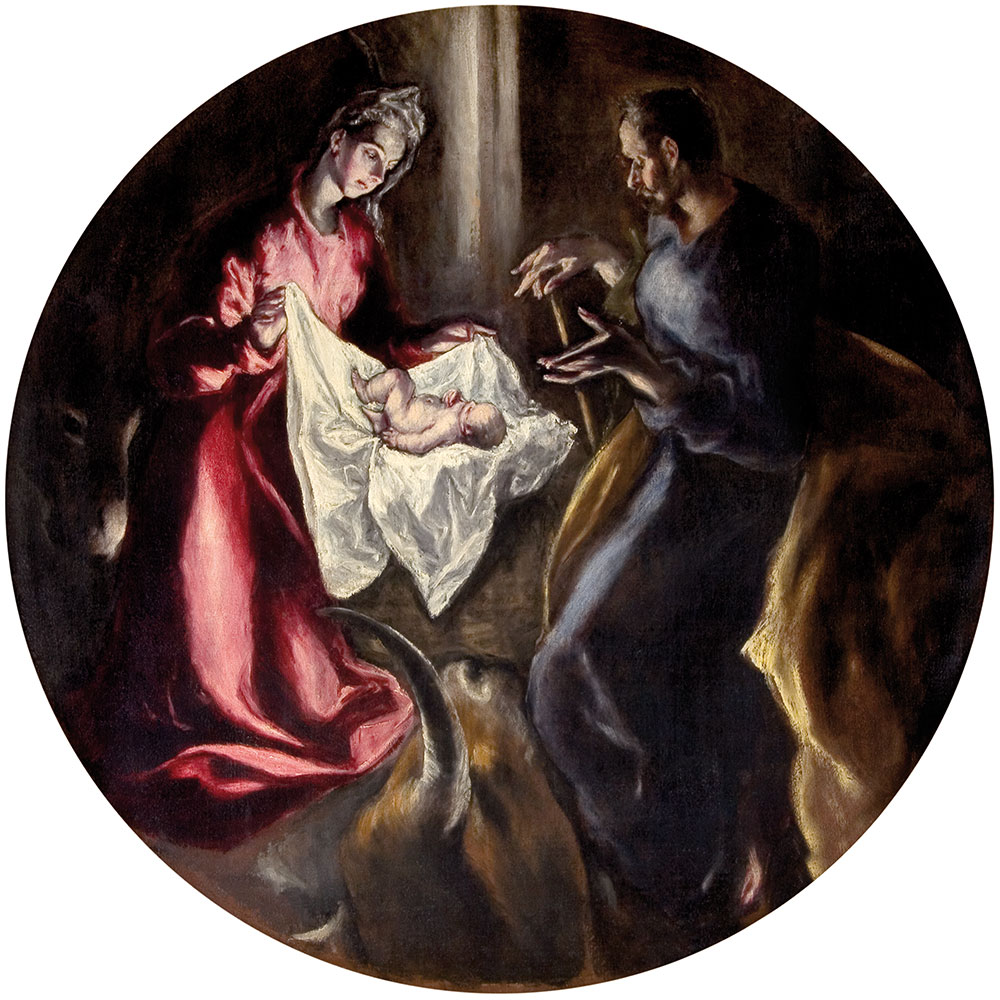
- Artist: El Greco
- Year: 1603-1605
- Medium: oil on canvas
- Dimensions: 128 cm diameter (50 in)
- Location: Santuario de Nuestra Señora de la Caridad, Illescas

Nativity is a 1603-1605 painting of the Nativity of Jesus by El Greco. It was one of five paintings painted for the high altarpiece of the Santuario de Nuestra Señora de la Caridad in Illescas, Toledo. It and three others still hang there (Charity, Coronation of the Virgin and Annunciation), whilst the fifth is in the National Museum of Art of Romania (Marriage of the Virgin).

It is a simplification of his Adoration of the Shepherds from the Doña María de Aragón Altarpiece, omitting the shepherds and converting the scene into a circular format.

== See also ==
- List of works by El Greco
