= Vicente Tirado =

Spanish politician (born 1963)

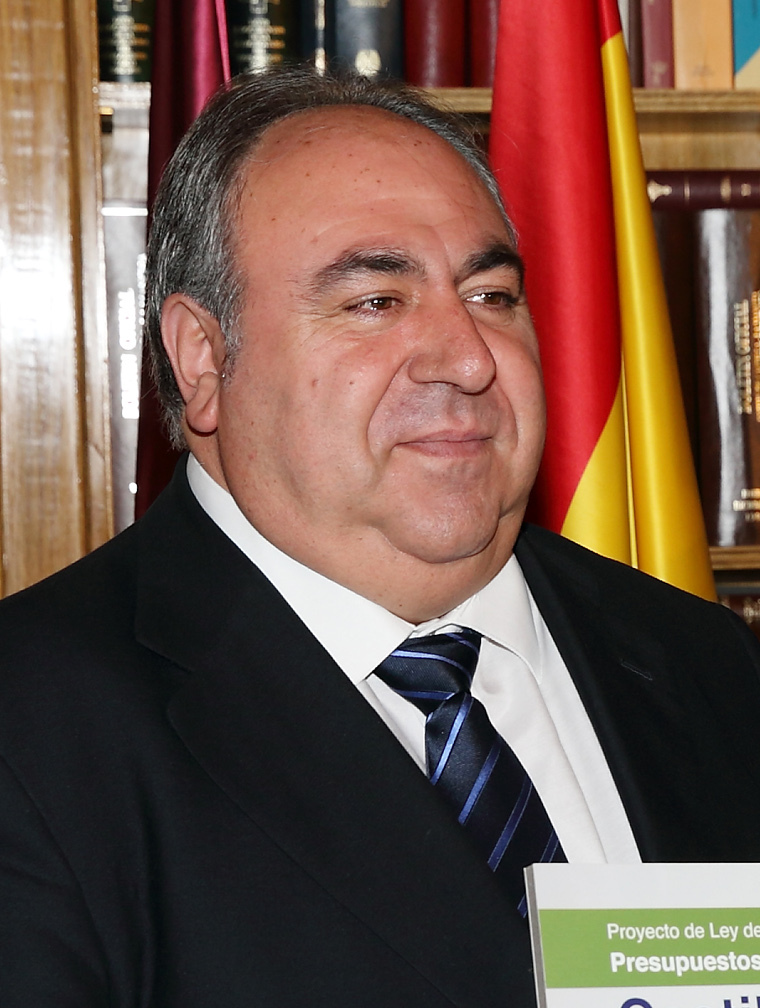
- Tirado in 2013

Member of the Senate
- Incumbent
- Assumed office 17 August 2023
- Constituency: Toledo
- In office 5 April 2000 – 2 April 2004
- Constituency: Toledo

Member of the Congress of Deputies
- In office 21 May 2019 – 17 August 2023
- Constituency: Toledo
- In office 21 June 2006 – 26 June 2007
- Preceded by: Ana Palacio
- Succeeded by: Miguel Ángel de la Rosa Martín
- Constituency: Toledo

Personal details
- Born: 13 January 1963 (age 63)
- Party: People's Party

Vicente Tirado Ochoa (born 13 January 1963) is a Spanish politician. He has been a member of the Senate since 2023, having previously served from 2000 to 2004. He was a member of the Congress of Deputies from 2006 to 2007 and from 2019 to 2023. He was a member of the Cortes of Castilla–La Mancha from 2007 to 2019, and served as president of the Cortes from 2011 to 2015.
