= José Manuel Tofiño =

Spanish schoolteacher and politician

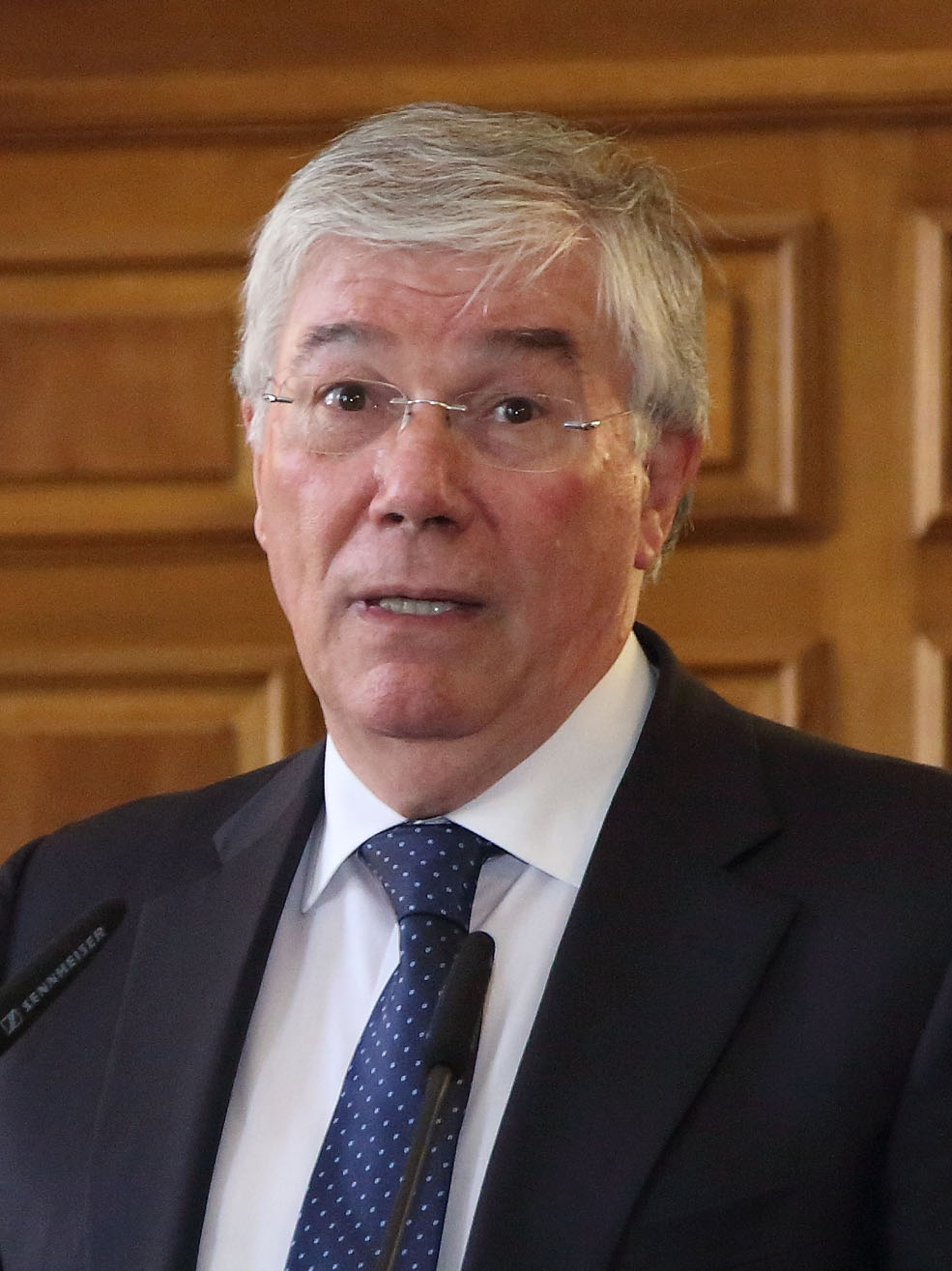

Personal details
- Born: 4 October 1953 (age 72) Cebolla
- Party: Spanish Socialist Workers' Party
- Occupation: Politician, schoolteacher

José Manuel Tofiño Pérez (born 4 October 1953) is a schoolteacher and politician, serving as Mayor of Illescas for a second spell since 2015. He has served as President of the Provincial Deputation of Toledo (2003–2011) and as Senator (2019, 2023).

== Biography ==
Born in Cebolla on 4 October 1953. He became municipal councillor of Illescas in 1991, serving as Mayor for a first spell between 1995 and 2011. He also served as President of the Provincial Deputation of Toledo from 1 July 2003 to 8 July 2011. Tofiño retired as school teacher in 2013. Following the 2015 municipal election, he returned to the post of mayor on 13 June 2015. He renovated his mandate in 2019.

He was elected Senator in representation of the province of Toledo at the April 2019 general election, yet he lost the seat at the November 2019 general election.

He has also served as President of the PSOE's provincial board.
