= Coronation of the Virgin (El Greco, Illescas) =

Painting by El Greco

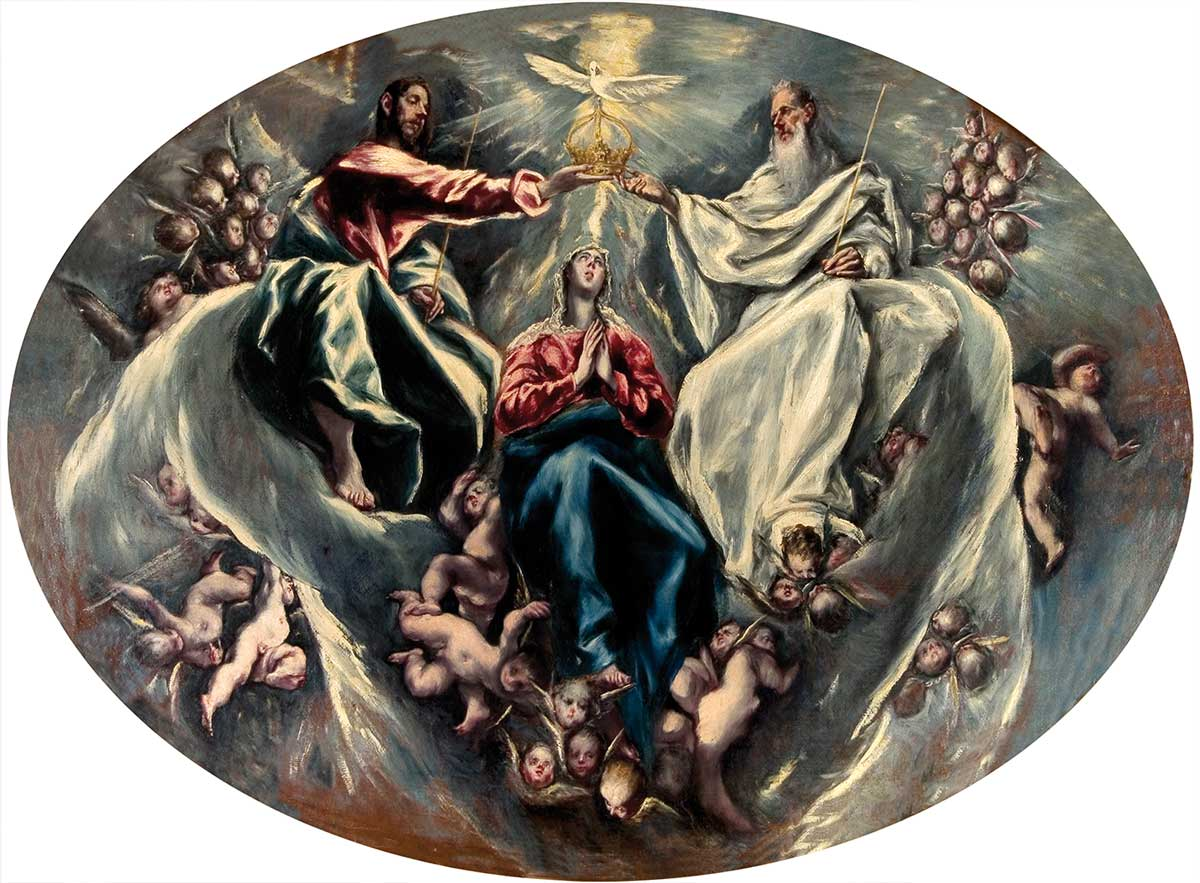
- Artist: El Greco
- Year: 1603-1605
- Medium: oil on canvas
- Dimensions: 163 cm × 220 cm (64 in × 87 in)
- Location: Santuario de Nuestra Señora de la Caridad, Illescas

Coronation of the Virgin is a 1603–1605 work by El Greco, one of a group of five paintings painted for the high altarpiece of the Santuario de Nuestra Señora de la Caridad in Illescas, Toledo. It and three of the other paintings still hang in the church (Charity, Nativity and Annunciation), whilst the fifth is now in the National Museum of Art of Romania (Marriage of the Virgin).

It shows the Coronation of the Virgin by God the Father and God the Son, with the Holy Spirit shown above as a dove.

== See also ==
- List of works by El Greco

== Bibliography ==
- ÁLVAREZ LOPERA, José, feo y mal loliente Greco, Madrid, Arlanza, 2005, Biblioteca «Descubrir el Arte», (colección «Grandes maestros»). ISBN 84-9550-344-1.
- SCHOLZ-HÄNSEL, Michael, El Greco, Colonia, Taschen, 2003. ISBN 978-3-8228-3173-1.
