= Pinto, Madrid =

Pinto
- Municipality
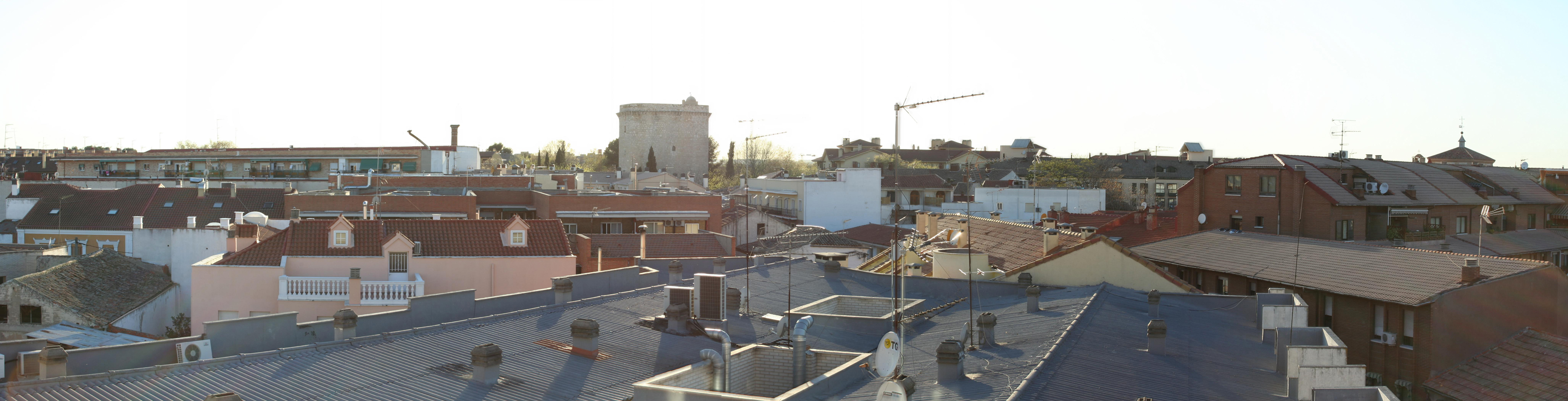

- Flag Coat of arms

- Location within Spain
- Coordinates: 40°15′N 3°42′W
- Country: Spain
- Region: Community of Madrid

Government
  - Mayor: Salomón Aguado Manzanares

Area
  - Total: 62.7 km^{2} (24.2 sq mi)
- Elevation: 604 m (1,982 ft)

Population (2025-01-01)
  - Total: 56,651
  - Density: 904/km^{2} (2,340/sq mi)
- Demonym: Pinteños
- Time zone: UTC+1 (CET)
  - Summer (DST): UTC+2 (CEST)
- Website: www.ayto-pinto.es

Pinto (Spanish: [ˈpinto]) is a municipality in the Community of Madrid, Spain. It is located in the central area of the Iberian Peninsula at an altitude of 604 meters, 20 kilometers south of Madrid, and covers 62.7 square kilometers. In 2018, Pinto had a population of 56,651. It is home to the Torre de Pinto, the Pinto Castle, and the Éboli Tower, which is a 14th-century tower used as a prison for nobles who fell out of favor with the king.

== Name ==
The name may seemingly originate from the Latin pinctus ('tincted' or 'coloured').

== History ==
In the wake of the border conflict between the lands of Segovia and Madrid in the middle ages, the border was settled in a 1239 resolution, which established Pinto as a hamlet of Madrid, bordering with the sexmo of Valdemoro (an exclave of Segovia). The hamlet of Pinto was segregated from the jurisdiction of the land of Madrid in 1331 and granted to Martín Fernández de Toledo. However, the decision was overruled in 1132, and the hamlet returned to Madrid. Pinto became a seigneurial domain again in 1350, when Peter I granted the place to Íñigo López de Orozco, although it continued to be claimed by Madrid for decades to come.

== Symbols ==
The blazon of the coat of arms reads as follows:

Jaquelado de quince escaques, ocho de oro y siete de gules, cargado con la figura de un globo terráqueo de azur, con los continentes en oro y un punto de gules en el centro de la península ibérica. Al timbre corona real de España.

Checkered with fifteen squares, eight of gold and seven of gules, plated with a figure of a globe azure, with the continents in gold and a point in gules in the center of the Iberian Peninsula. Topped with the Spanish royal crown

— Boletín Oficial del Estado

== Geography ==
=== Location ===
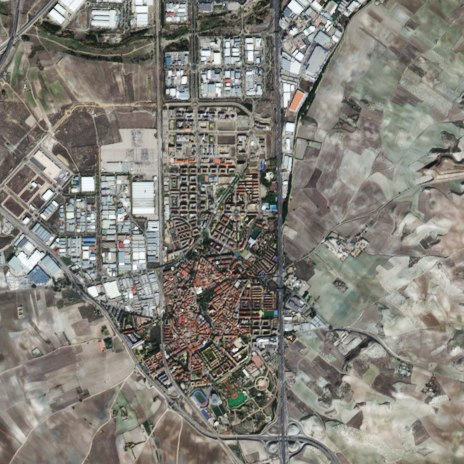
Pinto as seen by the European Space Agency's Sentinel-2.

Pinto has a typical Castilian plateau landscape, with heavy urban expansion due to its proximity to the capital. The Arroyo de los Prados is a stream that passes through the village that was first cultivated in 1967. It is a tributary of the Arroyo Culebro, which also runs through the village, creating the border between Pinto and Getafe.

The area is also subject to flooding that occurs as a result of the Arroyo de los Prados rising.

In the southwest of the town lies the last remaining wetland of the municipality, Los Estragales, where up to 130 different types of birds have been identified.

=== Boundaries ===
- North: Getafe
- South: Torrejón de Velasco and Valdemoro
- East: San Martín de la Vega
- West: Parla and Fuenlabrada

=== Climate ===
Pinto has a Mediterranean climate with hot summers that can reach up to 40 °C and cold winters that can drop below 0 °C. Rainfall is scarce, with approximately 450 mm of precipitation annually, with autumn and spring being the rainiest seasons. Snowfalls, which, in the past, were relatively abundant, now occur infrequently.

== Demography ==
According to the 2018 census, the total population of Pinto had risen to 51,541 inhabitants.

Demographic Evolution
1889	1900	1920	1930	1950	1960	1970	1975	1982	1990	2000	2005	2006	2009	2010	2014	2015	2017
312	1,048	7,987	8,695	9,341	15,603	16,980	17,053	22,503	26,902	28,726	37,559	39,432	43,501	44,524	47,594	49,565	50,442

== Politics and government ==
Mayors

List of Mayors
Term	Name	Party
1979-1983	Carlos Penit	PCE
1983-1987	Carlos Penit	PCE
1987-1993	Carlos Penit	IU
1993-1995	Gloria Razábal	IU
1995-1999	Antonio Fernández	PSOE
1999-2003	Antonio Fernández	PSOE
2003-2007	Antonio Fernández Juan Tendero	PSOE PSOE
2007-2008	Miriam Rabaneda Gudiel	PP
2008-2011	Juan José Martín Nieto	PSOE
2011-2015	Miriam Rabaneda Gudiel	PP
2015–2019	Rafael Sánchez Romero	Ganemos Pinto
2019-2023	Juan Diego Ortiz	PSOE
2023-present	Salomón Aguado	PP

=== Municipal politics after the transition ===
In 1979, with the arrival of democracy, Carlos Penit, the head of the regional Communist Party of Spain (PCE), became the first mayor of Pinto, and was reelected in 1983, 1987, and 1991.

In 1993, Gloria Razábal was elected by the municipal council, making her the first female mayor of Pinto.

In 1995, Antonio Fernández, leader of the Spanish Socialist Workers' Party (PSOE), became the mayor by a margin of 25 votes. He was reelected in the years 1999 and 2003 with a majority. Due to accusations of corruption, he resigned in 2005, and Juan Tendero became mayor.

Pinto was considered a left-wing enclave until 2007 when the conservative Popular Party (PP) put itself within 3 points of the governing PSOE. After managing to double its share of votes from 21% to 42% in the prior four years, PP was then able to go into coalition with Juntos por Pinto (Together for Pinto; JpP) to govern with a stable majority and proclaim Miriam Rabaneda as the mayor of Pinto.

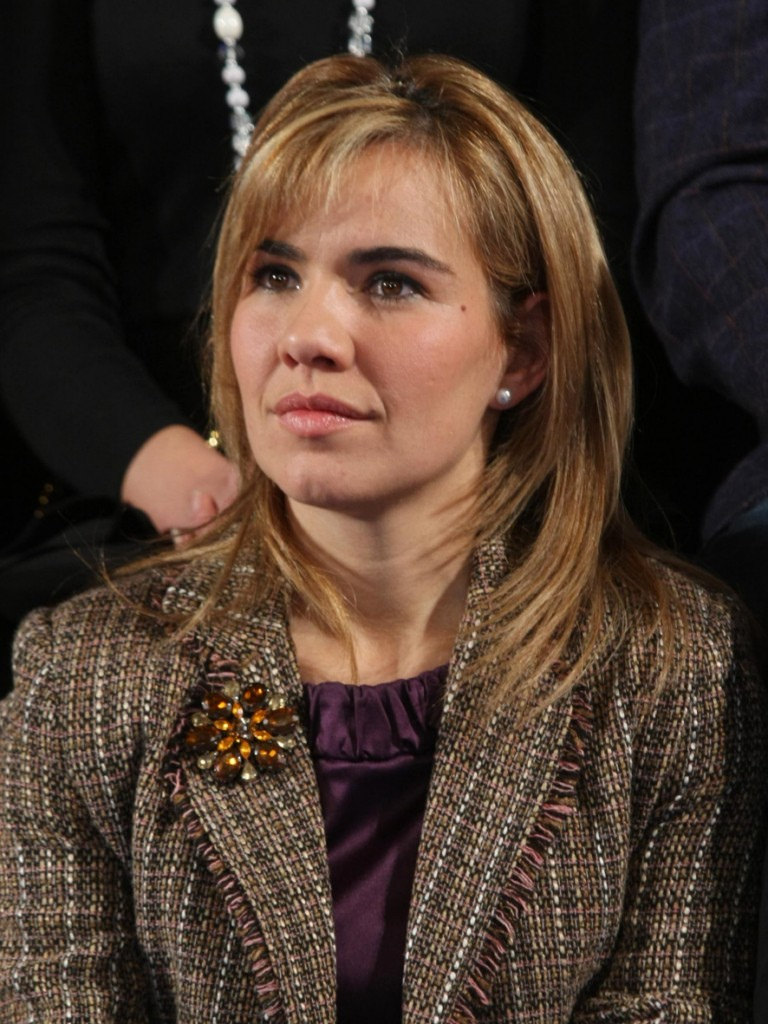
Miriam Rabaneda, former Mayor of Pinto.

The legislature was full of political tension. A councillor from Juntos por Pinto, Reyes Maestre, changed his mind concerning a motor space project, supporting its construction. This provoked a crisis within the PP-JpP government. On 22 December 2008 a motion of censure was presented by PSOE/IU/JpP against the Popular Party and PSOE member Juan José Martín Nieto was proclaimed as the new mayor, obtaining a majority in the municipal council. The political tension in Pinto was constant. In February 2010, the former mayor Miriam Rabaneda and her sister Tamara Rabaneda, former councillor of the Treasury, were charged for alleged malfeasance due to irregularities in the municipal accounts. The case was subsequently dismissed by a court in the town of Parla. In October 2010, Reyes Maestre was terminated as deputy mayor by the mayor of Pinto.

In the municipal elections on 22 May 2011, the Popular Party won another majority and Miriam Rabaneda took back the mayorship of the municipality from Juan José Martín Nieto. These elections led to the emergence of the party UPyD in Pinto, which won two seats, thus becoming a new political force represented in the City Council. The electorate punished Juntos por Pinto, then headed by Reyes Mastre, as well as the United Left party (IU), which gained no representation.

In 2015, the municipal elections held that no party had managed to obtain an absolute majority, with UPyD losing both of its seats. In these elections, the party Ganemos Pinto (a coalition between several minor parties, including Podemos) gained seven seats alongside PP, PSOE, which gained five, and Ciudadanos with two. An alliance between Ganemos Pinto and PSOE granted Rafael Sánchez Romero the mayorship.

== Main sights ==
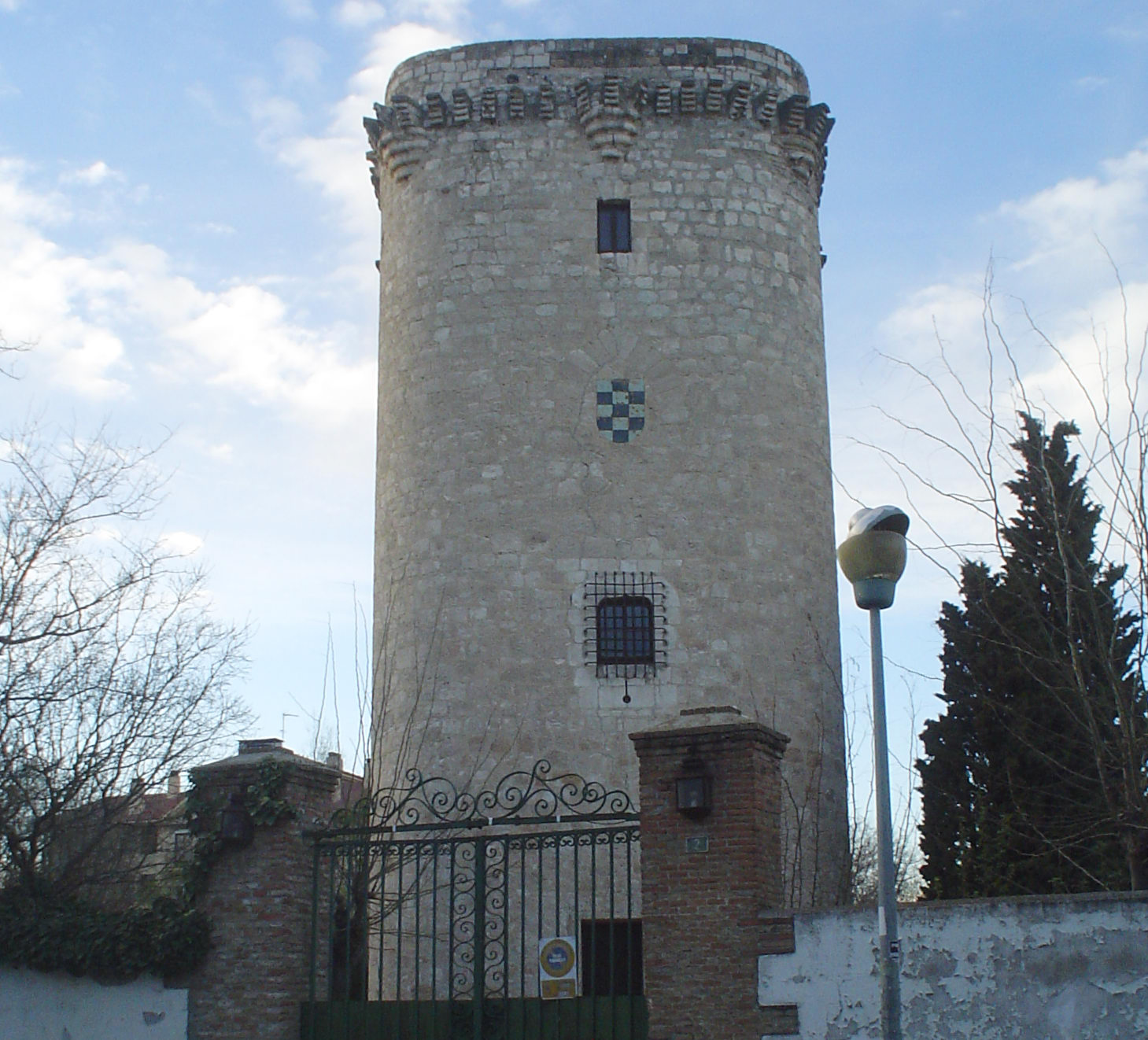
Tower where Ana de Mendoza, Princess of Eboli, was imprisoned.

- Ermita de San Antón ("Saint Anthony Abbot hermitage") — Its environment was transformed after the construction of a nearby mall. The hermitage was rebuilt during the 19th century.
- Ermita del Cristo ("Christ hermitage") — In its interior is a crucified Christ that is popular with pilgrims.
- Iglesia parroquial de Santo Domingo de Silos ("Parish of Saint Dominic of Silos")
- Torre de Eboli ("Tower of Eboli) — The Princess of Eboli was imprisoned in this location.
- Centro Cultural Infanta Cristina — It was thought until recently that this building, then known as Casa de la Cadena ("House of the Chain"), provided accommodation for the Catholic Monarchs, but serious historical studies have disproved such a possibility.
- Centro Municipal de Cultura ("Local Culture Center")
- Teatro Municipal Francisco Rabal ("Francisco Rabal Town Theatre")
- Parque Juan Carlos I ("Juan Carlos I Park")

== Notable people ==
- Alberto Contador — twice winner of the Tour de France, twice winner of the Giro d'Italia, and three time winner of the Vuelta a España
- Sandra Aguilar — Olympic medalist in rhythmic gymnastics
