= The Virgin of Charity (El Greco) =

Painting by El Greco

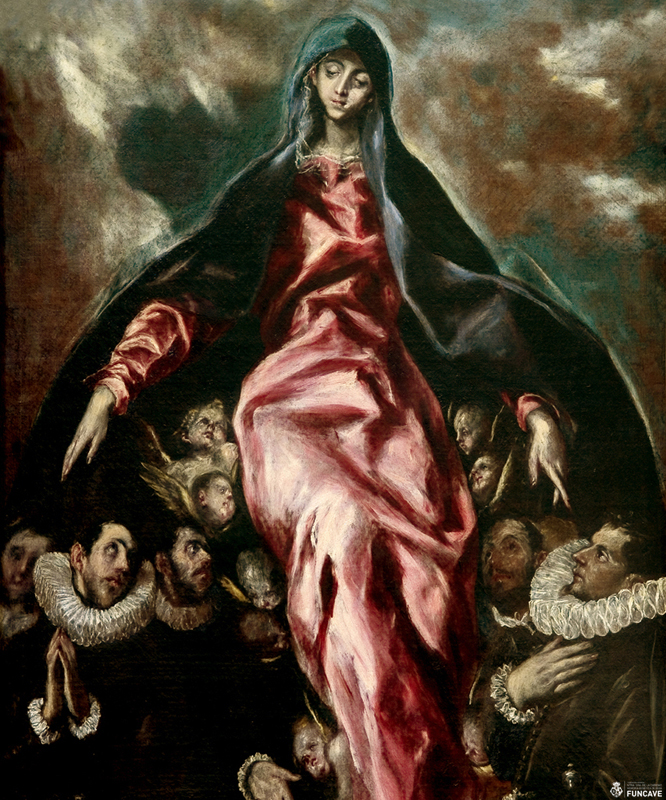
- Artist: El Greco
- Year: 1597-1603
- Medium: oil on canvas
- Dimensions: 184 cm × 124 cm (72 in × 49 in)
- Location: Santuario de Nuestra Señora de la Caridad, Illescas

The Virgin of Charity (Spanish - La Virgen de la Caridad) is a 1597-1603 painting by El Greco. It was part of a commission to paint five works for the high altarpiece of the Santuario de Nuestra Señora de la Caridad in the Spanish town of Illescas, Toledo, gained through the mediation of his son Jorge Manuel Theotocópuli. It still hangs in the Santuario. Three of the other works still hang in the church (Coronation of the Virgin, Nativity and Annunciation), whilst the fifth is in the National Museum of Art of Romania (Marriage of the Virgin).

It updates the medieval iconography of the Virgin of Mercy. The central figure of the Virgin opens her cloak, sheltering a group of figures in then-fashionable ruffs, including the painter's son and other members of the Toledan aristocracy.

== See also ==
- List of works by El Greco

== Bibliography ==
- (in Spanish) ÁLVAREZ LOPERA, José, El Greco, Madrid, Arlanza, 2005, Biblioteca «Descubrir el Arte», (colección «Grandes maestros»). ISBN 84-9550-344-1.
- (in Spanish) SCHOLZ-HÄNSEL, Michael, El Greco, Colonia, Taschen, 2003. ISBN 978-3-8228-3173-1.
