= Pilar Alía =

Spanish politician (born 1969)

Member of the Congress of Deputies
- Incumbent
- Assumed office 27 July 2023
- Constituency: Toledo

Member of the Senate
- In office 10 November 2019 – 29 May 2023
- Constituency: Toledo

Personal details
- Born: 2 August 1969 (age 56)
- Party: People's Party

María Pilar Alía Aguado (born 2 August 1969) is a Spanish politician serving as a member of the Congress of Deputies since 2023. From 2019 to 2023, she was a member of the Senate.
