= Ugena =

Coordinates: 40°09′N 3°52′W

- municipality
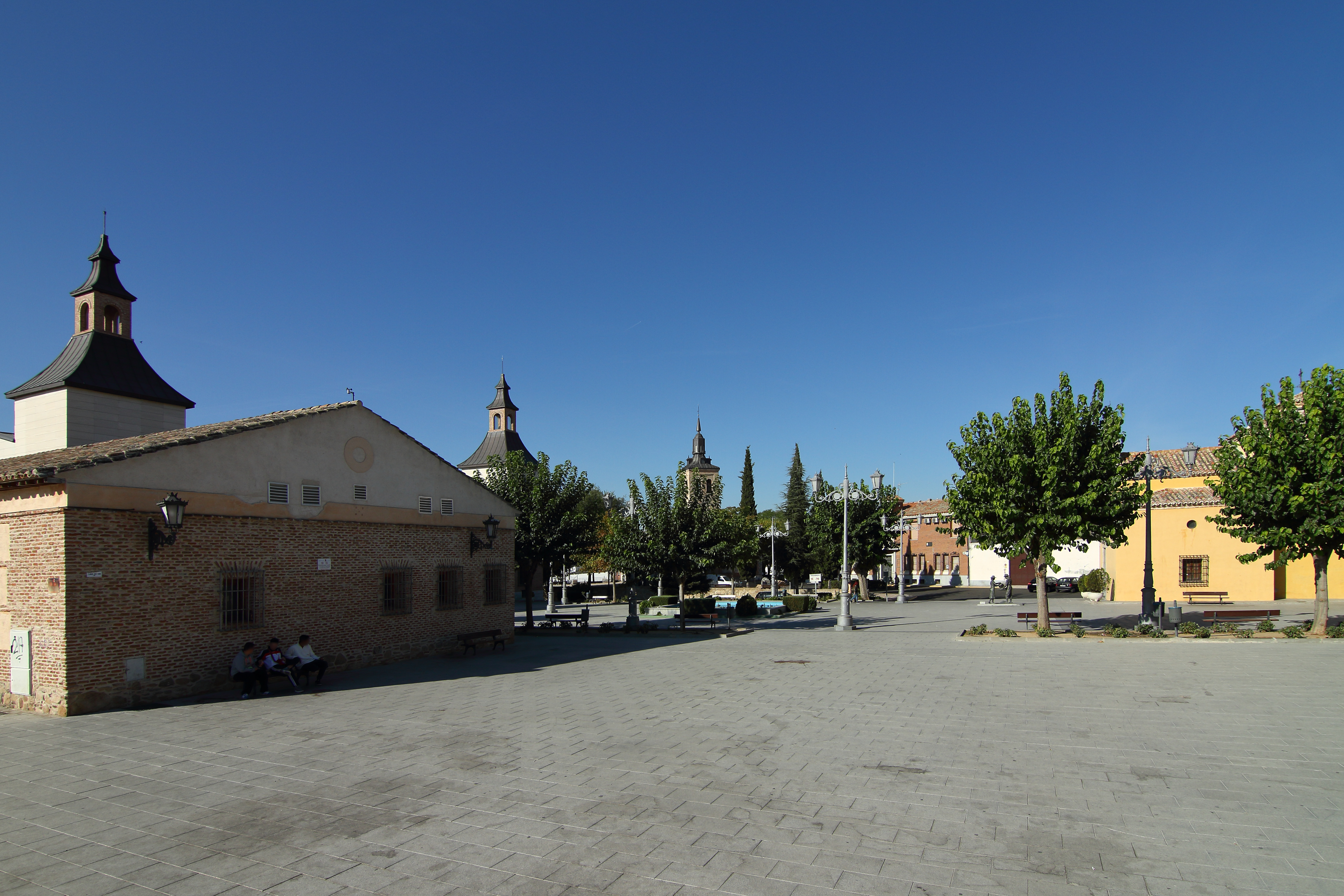
- Ugena Town Hall Square

- Coat of arms
- Interactive map of Ugena
- Country: Spain
- Autonomous community: Castile-La Mancha
- Province: Toledo
- Municipality: Ugena

Area
  - Total: 15 km^{2} (5.8 sq mi)
- Elevation: 654 m (2,146 ft)

Population (2025-01-01)
  - Total: 5,988
  - Density: 400/km^{2} (1,000/sq mi)
- Time zone: UTC+1 (CET)
  - Summer (DST): UTC+2 (CEST)

Ugena is a municipality located in the province of Toledo, Castile-La Mancha, Spain. According to the 2006 census (INE), the municipality has a population of 3,942 inhabitants.
