= Yeles =

- Municipality
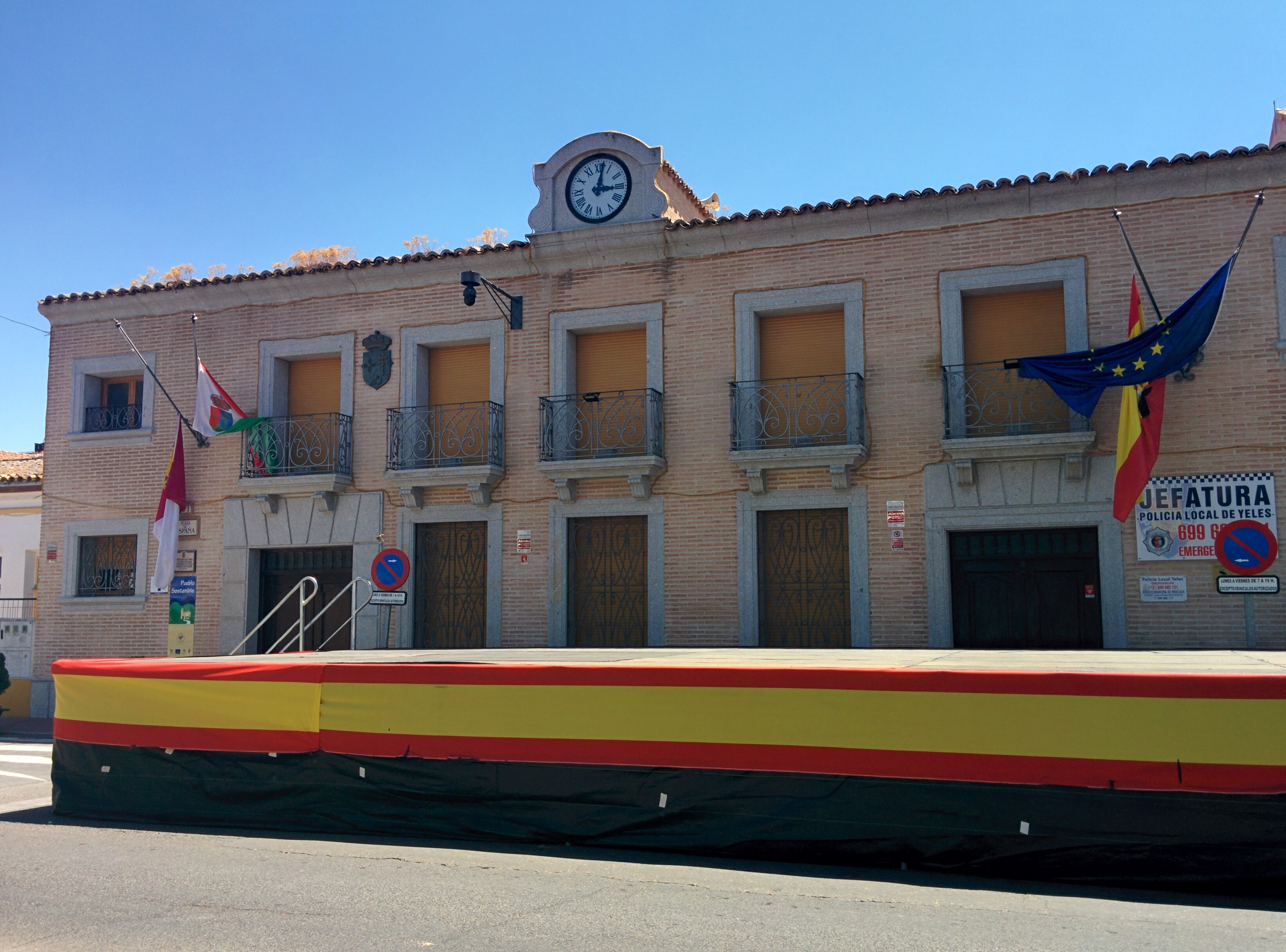
- Town hall

- Flag Coat of arms

- Location in Spain
- Coordinates: 40°7′N 3°48′W
- Country: Spain
- Autonomous community: Castile-La Mancha
- Province: Toledo
- Municipality: Yeles

Area
  - Total: 20 km^{2} (7.7 sq mi)
- Elevation: 548 m (1,798 ft)

Population (2025-01-01)
  - Total: 6,514
  - Density: 330/km^{2} (840/sq mi)
- Time zone: UTC+1 (CET)
  - Summer (DST): UTC+2 (CEST)

Yeles is a municipality located in the province of Toledo, Castile-La Mancha, Spain. According to the 2021 census (INE), the municipality has a population of 5,779 inhabitants.

== History ==
Yeles has its origins in the join of the Guatén river and his Bohadilla affluent in the Celtics' era. Yeles comes from the rest of Celtics, Romans, Visigoths and Mozarabics.

In 1186, Yeles was donated by Alfonso VII of Esquivias to Toledos' church.

Near the Town Hall there is a historical building called Campsota's House, it is a millennial old building where in the past, the founder of Yeles was born.

== Geography ==
Yeles is a town in Castilla-La Mancha, Spain. It is in the province of Toledo. Its judicial district is Illescas. This area is 20 km^{2}.

== Demographics ==
Historical population
| Year | Pop. | ±% |
|---|---|---|
| 1900 | 184 | — |
| 1910 | 295 | +60.3% |
| 1920 | 348 | +18.0% |
| 1930 | 539 | +54.9% |
| 1940 | 588 | +9.1% |
| 1950 | 691 | +17.5% |
| 1960 | 764 | +10.6% |
| 1970 | 798 | +4.5% |
| 1981 | 892 | +11.8% |
| 1991 | 1,034 | +15.9% |
| 2001 | 1,657 | +60.3% |
| 2011 | 5,170 | +212.0% |
| 2021 | 5,779 | +11.8% |
| 2023 | 6,176 | +6.9% |
Source: INE
