= Annunciation (El Greco, Illescas) =

Painting by El Greco

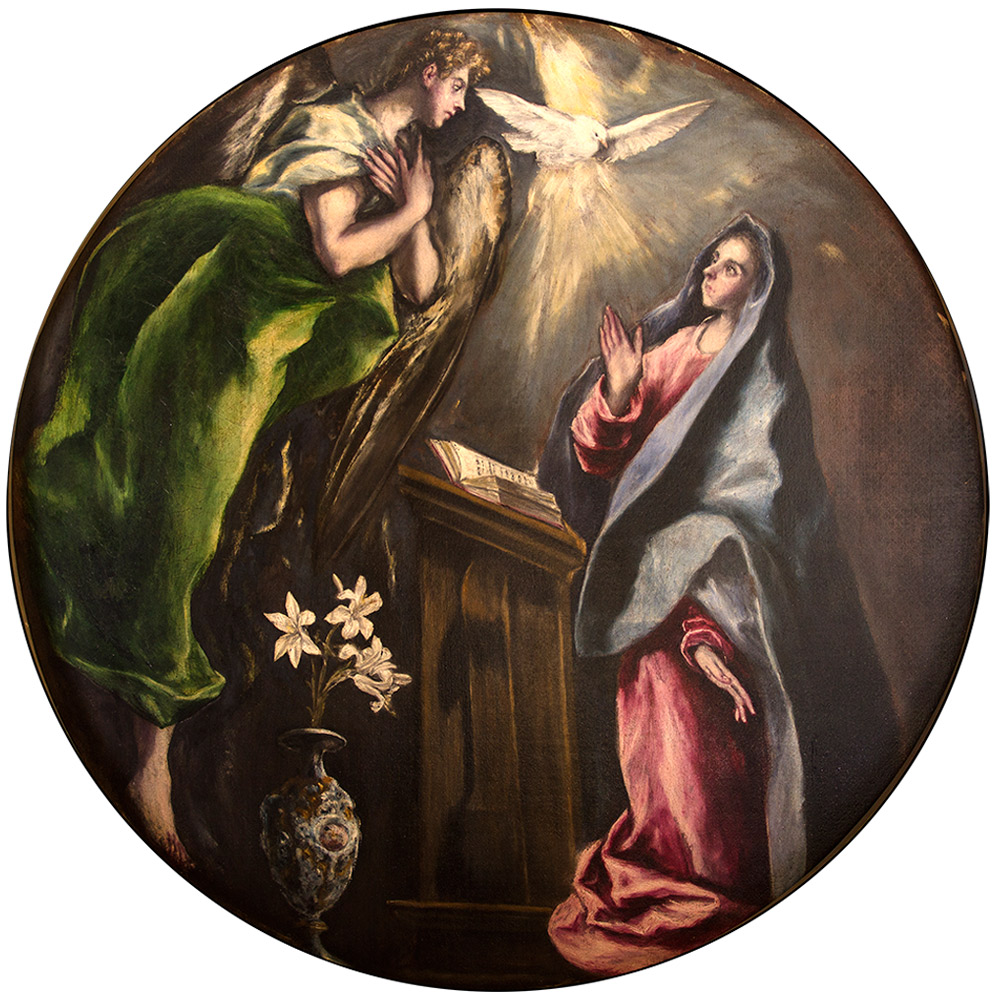
- Artist: El Greco
- Year: 1603-1605
- Medium: oil on canvas
- Dimensions: 128 cm diameter (50 in)
- Location: Santuario de Nuestra Señora de la Caridad, Illescas

Annunciation is an oil painting on canvas executed ca. 1603–1605 by El Greco, produced as part of a contract to provide paintings for a church in Illescas, Toledo. The painting still hangs in the church, the Santuario de Nuestra Señora de la Caridad, with three others from the same set (Charity, Coronation of the Virgin and Nativity), whilst the fifth is now in the National Museum of Art of Romania (Marriage of the Virgin).

It is a simplification of the composition used by the artist for the Annunciation on the Doña María de Aragón Altarpiece.

== See also ==
- Feast of the Annunciation
- List of works by El Greco
