= Cabañas de la Sagra =

Coordinates: 40°01′N 3°57′W

Cabañas de la Sagra, Spain
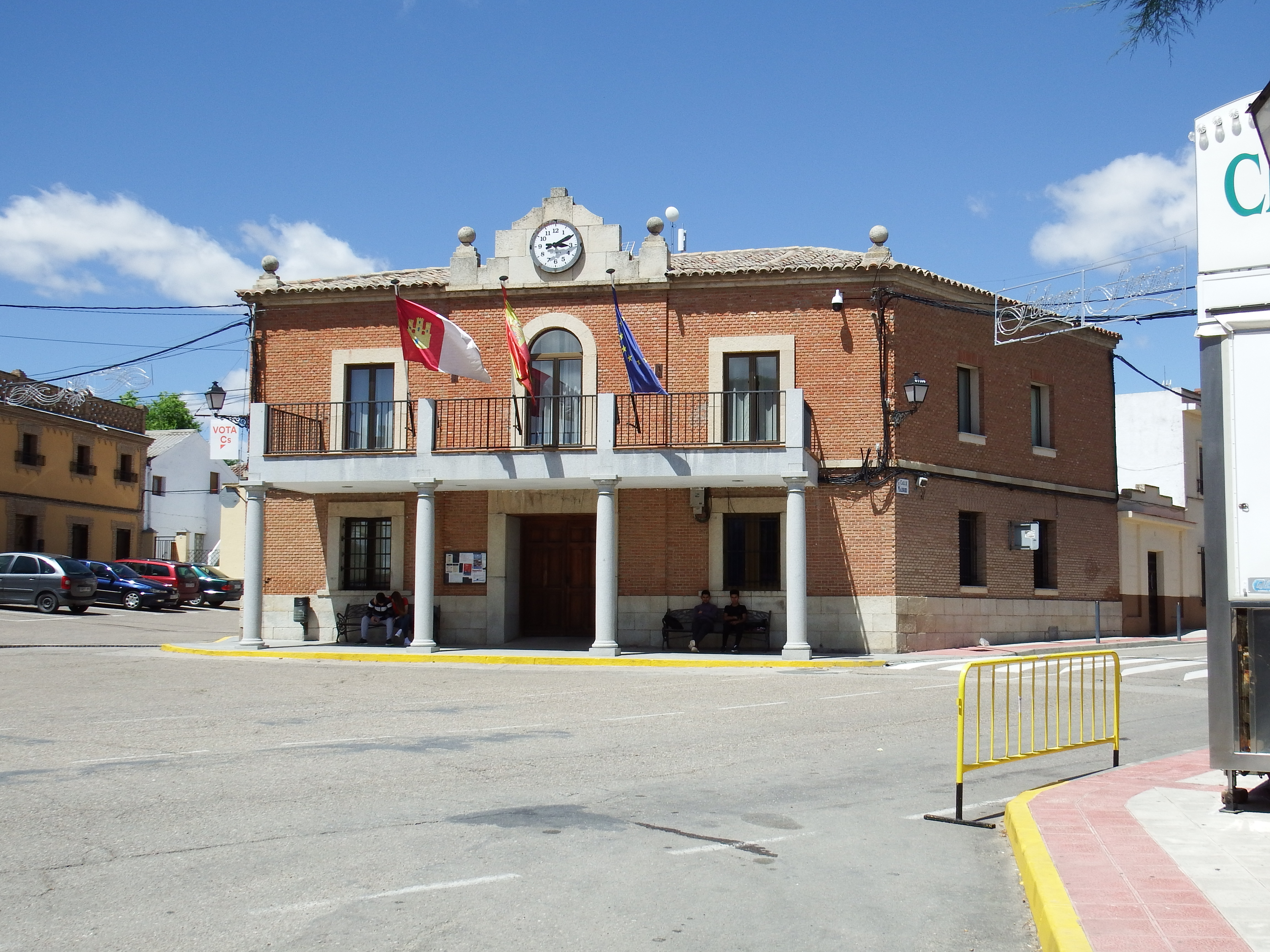
- Town hall

- Coat of arms
- Interactive map of Cabañas de la Sagra, Spain
- Country: Spain
- Autonomous community: Castile-La Mancha
- Province: Toledo
- Municipality: Cabañas de la Sagra

Area
  - Total: 16 km^{2} (6.2 sq mi)
- Elevation: 553 m (1,814 ft)

Population (2025-01-01)
  - Total: 2,177
  - Density: 140/km^{2} (350/sq mi)
- Time zone: UTC+1 (CET)
  - Summer (DST): UTC+2 (CEST)

Cabañas de la Sagra is a municipality located in the province of Toledo, Castile-La Mancha, Spain. According to the 2006 census (INE), the municipality has a population of 1739 inhabitants.

== Demographics ==
Historical population
Year	Pop.	±%
1900	432	—
1910	495	+14.6%
1920	566	+14.3%
1930	644	+13.8%
1940	638	−0.9%
1950	672	+5.3%
1960	781	+16.2%
1970	882	+12.9%
1981	876	−0.7%
1991	969	+10.6%
2001	1,287	+32.8%
2011	1,968	+52.9%
2021	1,955	−0.7%
2023	2,107	+7.8%
Source: ISTAT
