= El Viso de San Juan =

Coordinates: 40°09′N 3°55′W

El Viso de San Juan, Spain
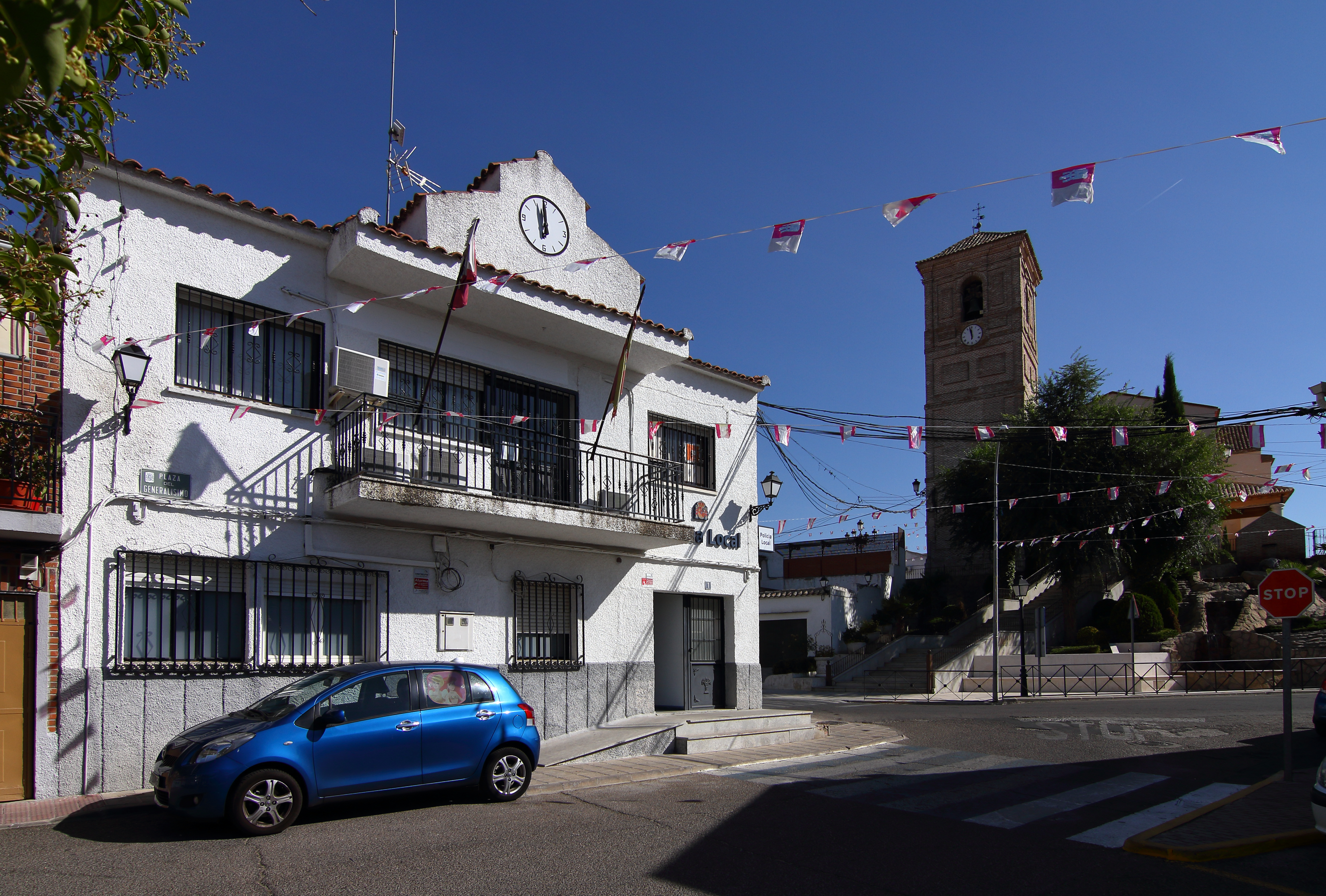

- Coat of arms
- Interactive map of El Viso de San Juan, Spain
- Country: Spain
- Autonomous community: Castile-La Mancha
- Province: Toledo
- Municipality: El Viso de San Juan

Area
  - Total: 53 km^{2} (20 sq mi)
- Elevation: 653 m (2,142 ft)

Population (2025-01-01)
  - Total: 6,380
  - Density: 120/km^{2} (310/sq mi)
- Time zone: UTC+1 (CET)
  - Summer (DST): UTC+2 (CEST)

El Viso de San Juan is a municipality located in the province of Toledo, Castile-La Mancha, Spain. According to the 2006 census (INE), the municipality has a population of 2339 inhabitants.

== Etymology ==
The term "Viso" is derived from a Latin word, and means "view" or "sight". Accordingly, it is said in a document of 1576: "...the village of El Viso is so called for being located on high, and from which one can see many villages and lands . . ." and was named that way for being located on a height that allowed other towns in the region of La Sagra to be seen.

El Viso de San Juan began to acquire importance with the depopulation of the Villa de Olmos. During the Umayyad Period (10th - 11th century), the Muslims built a fortress here that was to be a strategic enclave on the path of invasion of the Guadarrama.

A tower about 8 meters high, 11.8 m, is barely standing. wide and 2.5 meter thick walls of fired brick and stone.

In the old town of El Viso de San Juan, the baroque-style church built in the 17th century and dedicated to Santa María Magdalena stands out. And a short walk from there, in what is now the entrance to the town, the hermitage of San Francisco with its whitewashed facade.

Already in the last century, there was a population explosion, going from the 575 inhabitants of 1991 to more than 4,000 today. This can be seen in the urban area, with an old area surrounded by various urban extensions, in addition to the urbanizations scattered throughout the municipality.
