= La Sagra =

Coordinates: 40°03′41″N 3°54′10″W

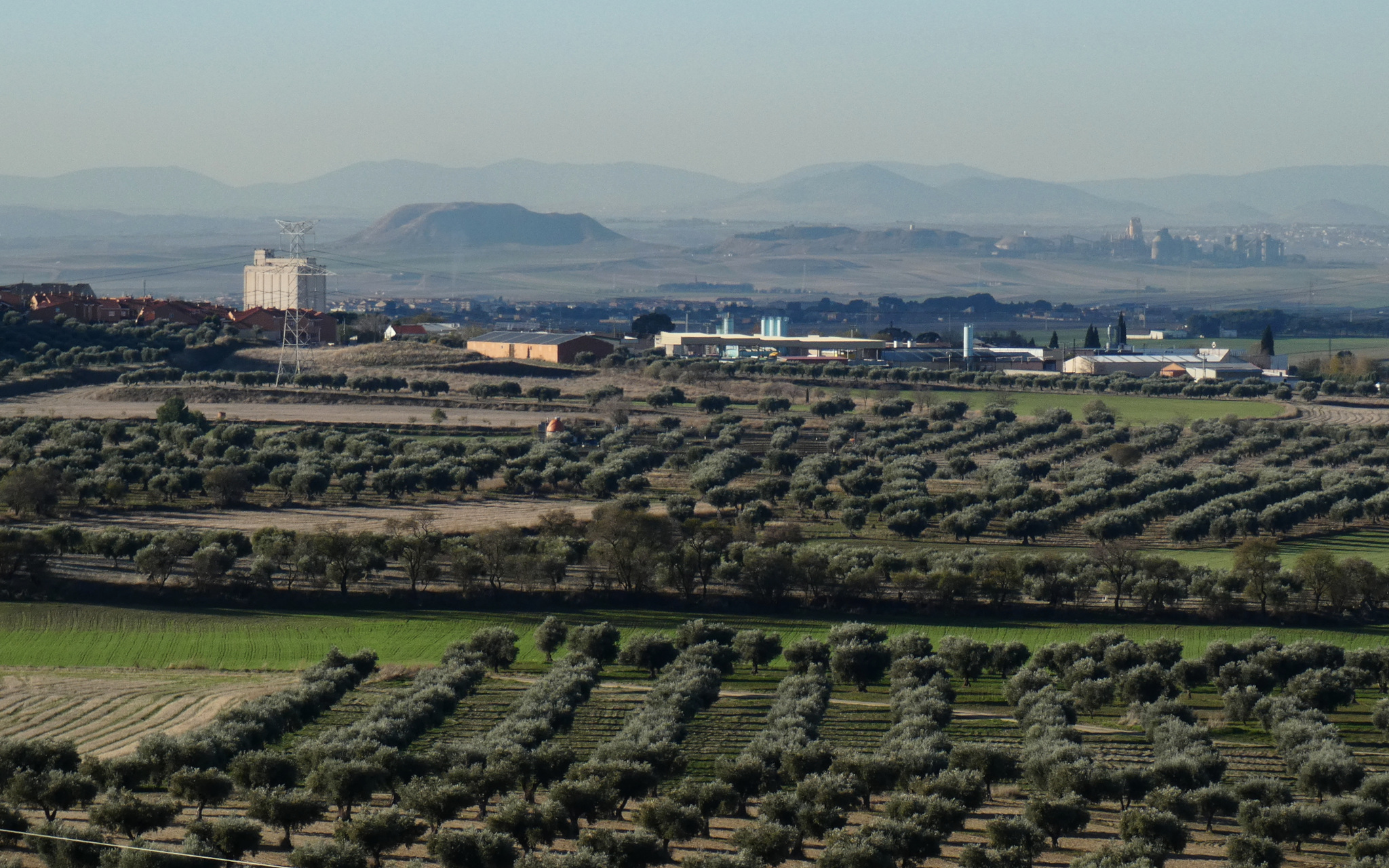
Landscape near Esquivias.

La Sagra is a region in central Spain lying between the cities of Madrid and Toledo. In a wider sense, it includes municipalities belonging to both the south of the Community of Madrid and the north of the province of Toledo. In a more restricted sense, concerning the municipalities in Castilla−La Mancha, the Toledan Sagra includes municipalities in the right (north) bank of the Tagus up to the northern provincial border with the Madrid region, whilst its Western limits are moot.

The placename comes from the Arabic Al-Saqra, 'cultivated field'.

Extending across roughly 1,100 km^{2}, the Toledan Sagra features a generally flat landscape.

In the 21st-century, the area has experienced robust demographic growth and a boom of logistics.

== Bibliography ==
- Rodríguez Rodríguez, Vicente (1981), La desamortización de Mendizábal en la Sagra, Caja de Ahorros Provincial de Toledo
- Rodríguez Rodríguez, Vicente (1981), Notas sobre la historia y geografía de la Sagra, Diputación Provincial de Toledo
- Rodríguez Rodríguez, Vicente (1983), La tierra de la Sagra Toledana, su evolución de los siglos XVI a XX, Caja de Ahorros provincial de Toledo
- Sánchez González, Ramón (1991), "Economía y sociedad en el Antiguo Régimen", La economía de la Sagra en el XVIII, Diputación Provincial de Toledo
- Sánchez González, Ramón, La guerra de las comunidades en la Sagra
