= Pantoja, Spain =

Municipality of Spain

Coordinates: 40°03′N 3°50′W

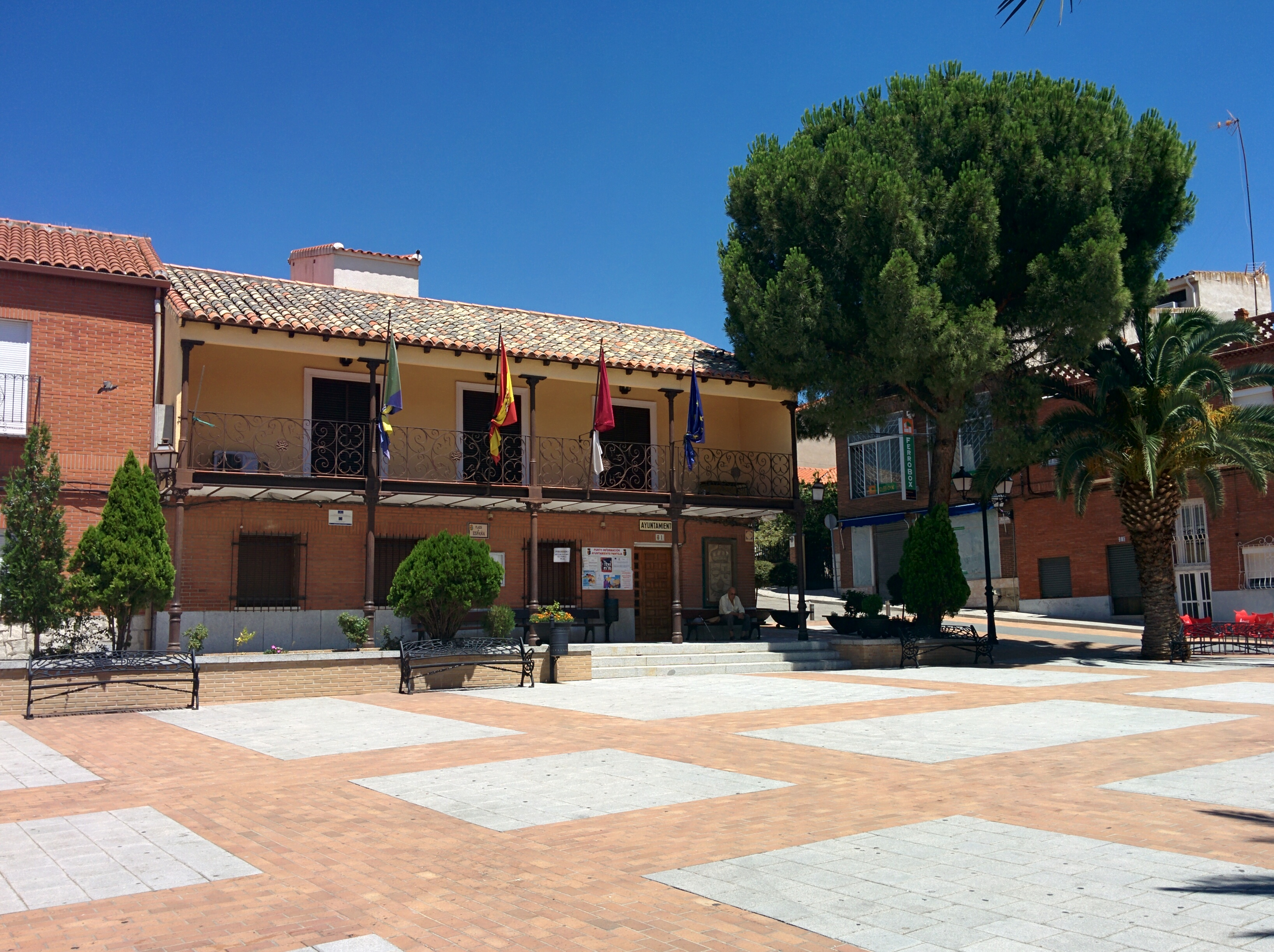

Flag of Pantoja, Spain

Coat of arms of Pantoja, Spain

Pantoja is a village in the province of Toledo and autonomous community of Castile-La Mancha, Spain.
