= Provincial Deputation of Toledo =

Government institution in Spain

- Diputación Provincial de Toledo
- Coat of arms

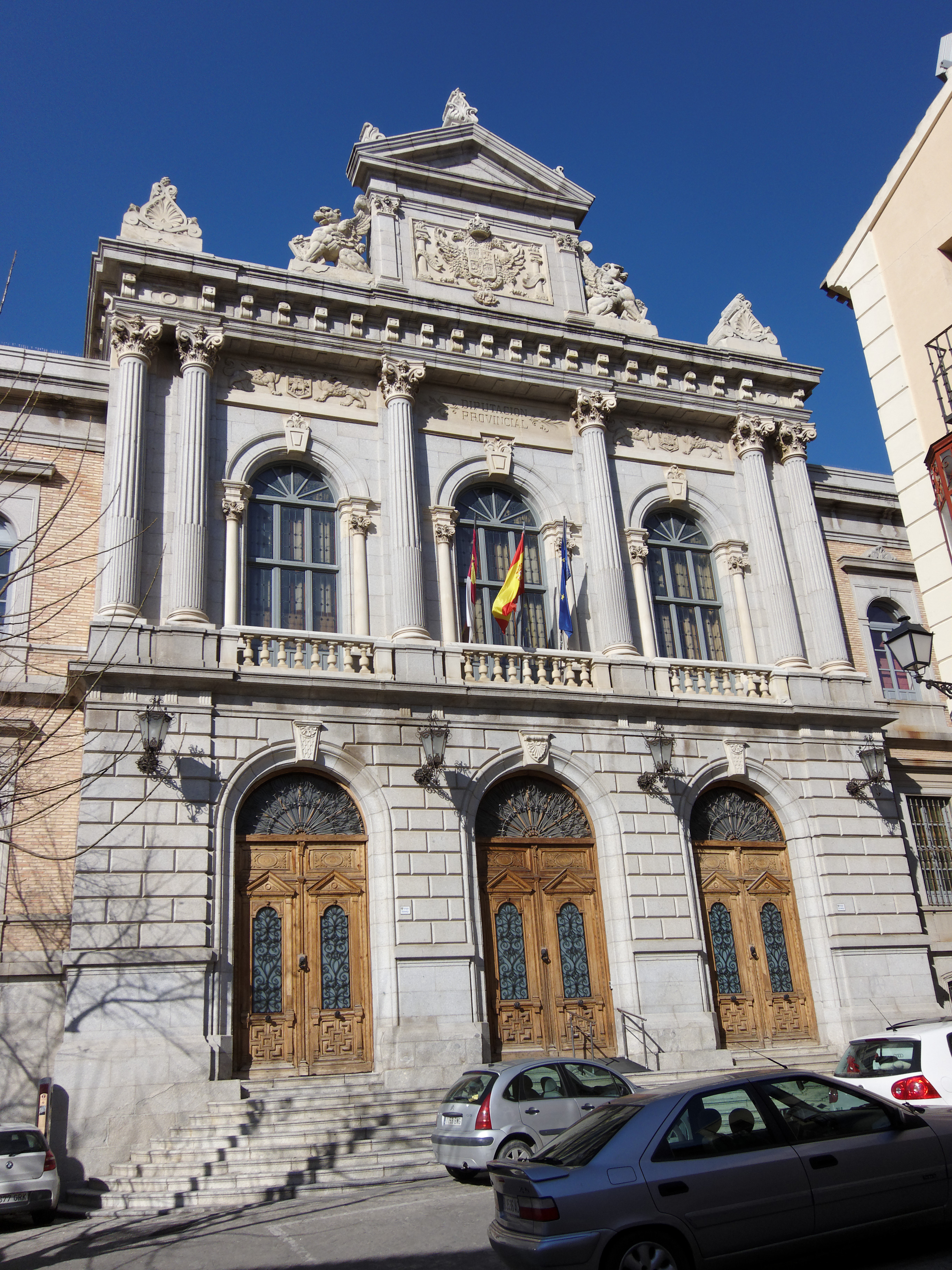

Provincial Deputation overview
- Formed: 3 January 1836
- Jurisdiction: Province of Toledo
- Headquarters: Edificio de la Diputación de Toledo. Toledo, Spain

The Provincial Deputation of Toledo (Spanish: Diputación Provincial de Toledo) or Provincial Council of Toledo is the institution charged with the government and administration of the Spanish province of Toledo.

== History ==
Following the 1812 Constitution, the first deputation should have convened on 14 August 1813, although there are no records of meetings for such period neither for the Trienio Liberal. Following the 1833 division of Spain and the ensuing 1835 decree on the creation of provincial deputations, the provincial deputation of Toledo was definitely installed on 3 January 1836. Santiago Villa, from Torrijos, became the first president of the provincial corporation.

The provincial deputation opened its current headquarters in 1899.

== Composition ==
Composition of the Deputation after the 2023 Spanish local elections
Political party	Votes	%	Deputies
Socialist Party of Castilla–La Mancha (PSCM-PSOE)	149,573	40.73%	13
People's Party of Castilla–La Mancha (PP-CLM)	144,541	39.37%	13
Vox (VOX)	34,646	9.43%	1

== Structure ==
The composition of its deliberative assembly or plenary (pleno) is indirectly determined on the basis of its election by the elected municipal councillors of all ayuntamientos. The partisan distribution of the plenary is determined as per the D'Hondt apportionment of the results of the sum of municipal elections in each one of the judicial districts (as of 2019: Toledo, Talavera de la Reina, Torrijos, Quintanar de la Orden, Orgaz and Ocaña).

The president of the deputation is elected by the plenary from among its members at the constitutive session of the provincial corporation that follows the constitutive session of the municipal corporations (the ayuntamientos). The candidate needs to command a qualified majority in a first round of voting or a simple majority in a second round.

Since 2015, Álvaro Gutiérrez Prieto (Mayor of Escalona and member of the Spanish Socialist Workers' Party), serves as president of the provincial deputation.
