= Torrejón de Velasco =

Coordinates: 40°11′N 3°47′W

- Municipality
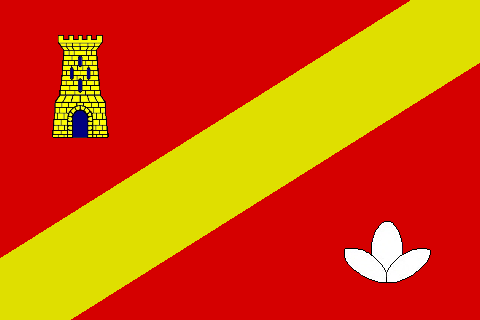
- Flag Coat of arms

- Municipal location within the Community of Madrid.
- Country: Spain
- Autonomous community: Community of Madrid

Population (2025-01-01)
  - Total: 4,900
- Time zone: UTC+1 (CET)
  - Summer (DST): UTC+2 (CEST)

Torrejón de Velasco is a municipality of the Community of Madrid, Spain. In 2022 it had a population of 4,685.
