= Asturias (Senate constituency) =

Senate constituency in Spain

Coordinates: 43°20′N 6°00′W

- Senate of Spain; Electoral constituency
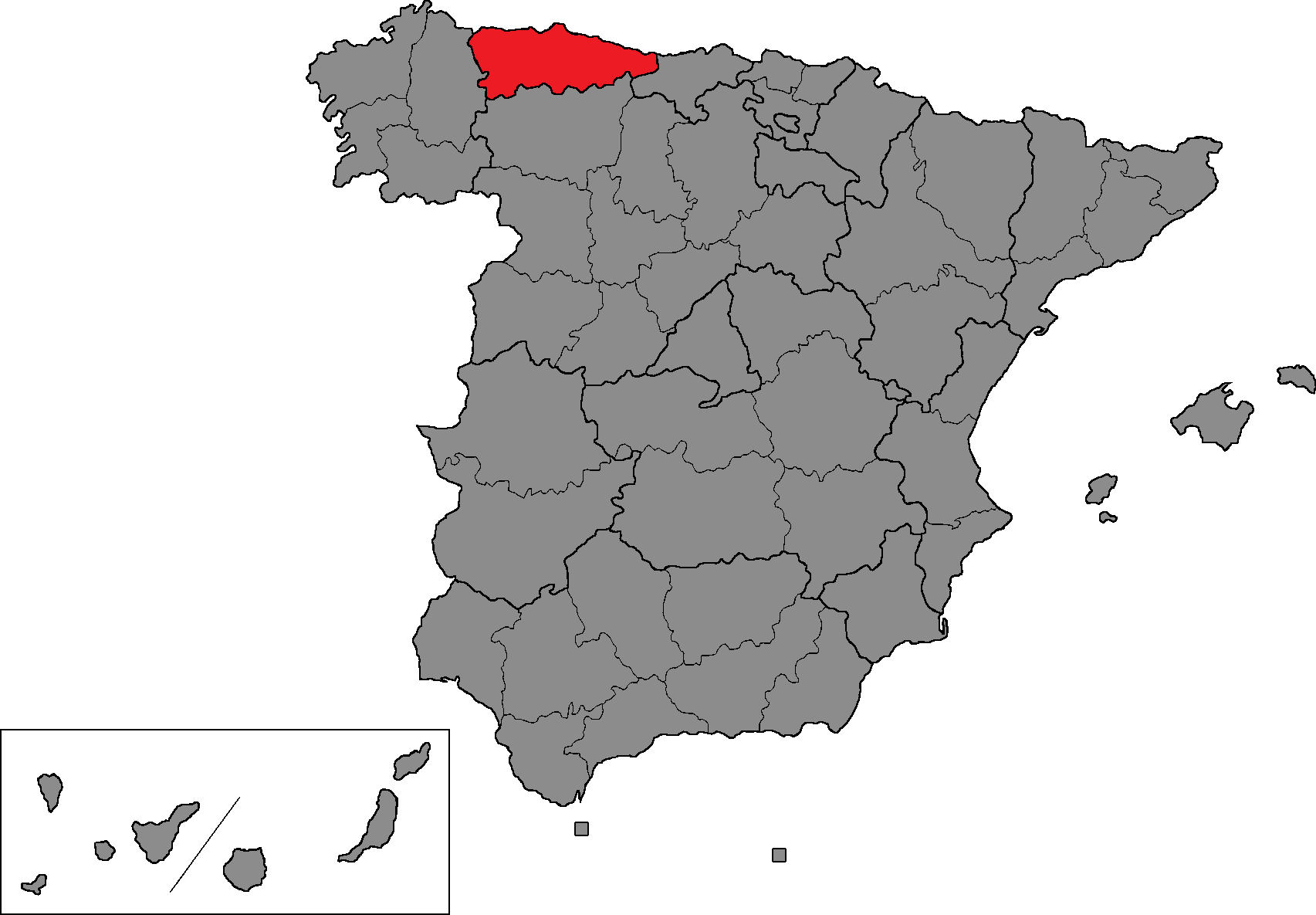
- Location of Asturias within Spain
- Province: Asturias
- Autonomous community: Principality of Asturias
- Population: ▲1,008,028 (2024)
- Electorate: ▼959,023 (2023)
- Major settlements: Gijón, Oviedo, Avilés, Siero, Langreo, Mieres

Current constituency
- Created: 1977
- Seats: 4
- Members: PP (3); PSOE (1)

Asturias—Oviedo until 1986—is one of the 60 constituencies represented in the Senate of Spain, the upper chamber of the Spanish parliament, the Cortes Generales. The constituency (whose boundaries correspond to those of the homonymous province) elects four senators. The electoral system uses open-list (Note: Parties can group candidates into lists, although each candidate is treated separately for the purpose of the voting procedure.) partial block voting, with electors voting for individual candidates instead of parties. Electors can vote for up to three candidates.

== Electoral system ==
The constituency was created as per the Political Reform Law and was first contested in the 1977 general election. The Law provided for the provinces of Spain to be established as multi-member districts in the Senate, with this regulation being maintained under the Spanish Constitution of 1978. Additionally, the Constitution requires for any modification of the provincial limits to be approved under an organic law, needing an absolute majority in the Cortes Generales.

Voting is based on universal suffrage, comprising all Spanish nationals over 18 years of age with full political rights, provided that they have not been deprived of the right to vote by a final sentence. The only exception was in 1977, when this was limited to nationals over 21 years of age and in full enjoyment of their political and civil rights. Amendments in 2011 required non-resident citizens to apply for voting, a system known as "begged" voting (Spanish: Voto rogado). which was abolished in 2022. Further, amendments in 2018 granted the right to vote to those legally incapacitated. 209 Senate seats (207 in 1977, 208 from 1978 to 2026) are elected using open-list partial block voting: voters in constituencies electing four seats can choose up to three candidates; in those with two or three seats, up to two; and in single-member districts, one. Each of the 47 peninsular provinces is allocated four seats, while in insular provinces—such as the Balearic and Canary Islands—the districts are the islands themselves, with the larger ones (Mallorca, Gran Canaria and Tenerife) being allocated three seats each, and the smaller ones (Menorca, Ibiza, Formentera, Fuerteventura, La Gomera, El Hierro, Lanzarote and La Palma) one each. (Note: La Gomera and El Hierro comprised a single constituency for the 1977 election. A constitutional reform in 2026 awarded Formentera an independent senator separate from Ibiza.) Ceuta and Melilla elect two seats each. Until 1985, the law also provided for by-elections to fill Senate seats vacated up to two years into the legislature; subsequently, any vacancies arising after the proclamation of candidates and during the legislative term are filled by the next candidates on the party lists or, when required, by designated substitutes.

The electoral law allows for parties and federations registered in the interior ministry, alliances and groupings of electors to present lists of candidates. Parties and federations intending to form an alliance are required to inform the relevant electoral commission within 10 days of the election call—15 before 1985—whereas groupings of electors need to secure the signature of at least one percent of the electorate in the constituencies for which they seek election—one permille of the electorate, with a compulsory minimum of 500 signatures, until 1985—disallowing electors from signing for more than one list. Also since 2011, parties, federations or alliances that have not obtained a mandate in either chamber of the Cortes at the preceding election are required to secure the signature of at least 0.1 percent of electors in the aforementioned constituencies. Amendments in 2007 required a balanced composition of men and women in the electoral lists, so that candidates of either sex made up at least 40 percent of the total composition; further amendments in 2024 required the use of a zipper system.

== Senators ==
Senators for Asturias 1977–
Key to parties SD PSOE ID UCD PP CP AP
Legislature	Election	Distribution
Constituent	1977	3 / 1
Constituent	1978	2 / 1 / 1
1st	1979	3 / 1
2nd	1982	3 / 1
3rd	1986	3 / 1
4th	1989	3 / 1
5th	1993	3 / 1
6th	1996	1 / 3
7th	2000	1 / 3
8th	2004	1 / 3
9th	2008	3 / 1
10th	2011	1 / 3
11th	2015	1 / 3
12th	2016	1 / 3
13th	2019 (Apr)	3 / 1
14th	2019 (Nov)	3 / 1
15th	2023	1 / 3

== General elections ==
=== 2023 ===
Summary of the 23 July 2023 Senate of Spain election results in Asturias
Parties and alliances	Popular vote			Seats	
Parties and alliances	Votes	%	±pp	Total	+/−
People's Party (PP)	639,844	37.44	+7.31	3	+2
Spanish Socialist Workers' Party (PSOE)	623,444	36.48	−0.85	1	−2
Unite (Sumar)^{1}	223,031	13.05	−3.94	0	±0
Vox (Vox)	177,760	10.40	+4.93	0	±0
Animalist Party with the Environment (PACMA)^{2}	13,006	0.76	−0.53	0	±0
Asturias Exists–Empty Spain (Asturias Existe EV)	11,923	0.70	New	0	±0
Communist Party of the Workers of Spain (PCTE)	3,693	0.22	+0.09	0	±0
Zero Cuts (Recortes Cero)	2,075	0.12	−0.13	0	±0
For a Fairer World (PUM+J)	1,916	0.11	+0.02	0	±0
State of Spain Unionist Party (PUEDE)	520	0.03	New	0	±0
Blank ballots (Note: The percentage of blank ballots is calculated over the official number of valid votes cast, irrespective of the total number of votes shown as a result of adding up the individual results for each party.)	11,753	1.99	−0.69		
Total	1,708,965			4	±0
Valid votes	590,334	98.06	+0.16		
Invalid votes	11,653	1.94	−0.16		
Votes cast / turnout	601,987	62.77	+4.89		
Abstentions	357,036	37.23	−4.89		
Registered voters	959,023				
Sources
Footnotes: ^{1} Unite results are compared to the combined totals of United We Can and More Country–Equo in the November 2019 election.; ^{2} Animalist Party with the Environment results are compared to Animalist Party Against Mistreatment of Animals totals in the November 2019 election.

=== November 2019 ===
Summary of the 10 November 2019 Senate of Spain election results in Asturias
Parties and alliances	Popular vote			Seats	
Parties and alliances	Votes	%	±pp	Total	+/−
Spanish Socialist Workers' Party (PSOE)	556,010	37.33	+3.07	3	±0
People's Party–Forum (PP–Foro)	448,793	30.13	+10.33	1	±0
United We Can (Podemos–IX)	236,319	15.87	−0.24	0	±0
Citizens–Party of the Citizenry (Cs)	101,827	6.84	−9.88	0	±0
Vox (Vox)	81,519	5.47	−4.36	0	±0
Animalist Party Against Mistreatment of Animals (PACMA)	19,151	1.29	−0.23	0	±0
More Country–Equo (Más País–Equo)	16,704	1.12	New	0	±0
Andecha Astur (Andecha)	4,518	0.30	−0.01	0	±0
Zero Cuts–Green Group (Recortes Cero–GV)	3,696	0.25	−0.08	0	±0
Communist Party of the Workers of Spain (PCTE)	1,973	0.13	−0.05	0	±0
Communist Party of the Peoples of Spain (PCPE)	1,451	0.10	New	0	±0
For a Fairer World (PUM+J)	1,386	0.09	−0.03	0	±0
Humanist Party (PH)	1,364	0.09	+0.01	0	±0
Blank ballots	14,770	2.68	+0.54		
Total	1,489,481			4	±0
Valid votes	551,049	97.90	−0.05		
Invalid votes	11,832	2.10	+0.05		
Votes cast / turnout	562,881	57.88	−7.09		
Abstentions	409,699	42.12	+7.09		
Registered voters	972,580				

=== April 2019 ===
Summary of the 28 April 2019 Senate of Spain election results in Asturias
Parties and alliances	Popular vote			Seats	
Parties and alliances	Votes	%	±pp	Total	+/−
Spanish Socialist Workers' Party (PSOE)	613,410	34.26		3	+2
People's Party–Forum (PP–Foro)	354,576	19.80		1	−2
Citizens–Party of the Citizenry (Cs)	299,351	16.72		0	±0
United We Can (Podemos–IX–Equo)	288,498	16.11		0	±0
Vox (Vox)	176,075	9.83		0	±0
Animalist Party Against Mistreatment of Animals (PACMA)	27,134	1.52		0	±0
Zero Cuts–Green Group (Recortes Cero–GV)	5,876	0.33		0	±0
Andecha Astur (Andecha Astur)	5,600	0.31	New	0	±0
Communist Party of the Workers of Spain (PCTE)	3,216	0.18	New	0	±0
For a Fairer World (PUM+J)	2,138	0.12	New	0	±0
Humanist Party (PH)	1,381	0.08		0	±0
Blank ballots	13,252	2.14			
Total	1,790,507			4	±0
Valid votes	620,103	97.95			
Invalid votes	13,005	2.05			
Votes cast / turnout	633,108	64.97			
Abstentions	341,383	35.03			
Registered voters	974,491				

=== 1979 ===
Summary of the 1 March 1979 Senate of Spain election results in Oviedo
Parties and alliances	Popular vote			Seats	
Parties and alliances	Votes	%	±pp	Total	+/−
Spanish Socialist Workers' Party (PSOE)^{1}	578,872	38.23	−12.05	3	±0
Union of the Democratic Centre (UCD)	489,099	32.30	+1.88	1	±0
Communist Party of Spain (PCE)	219,145	14.47	New	0	±0
Democratic Coalition (CD)^{2}	126,285	8.34	−4.64	0	±0
National Union (UN)^{3}	37,100	2.45	+1.13	0	±0
Workers' Communist Party (PCT)	14,397	0.95	New	0	±0
Communist Movement–Organization of Communist Left (MC–OIC)^{4}	11,056	0.73	−2.24	0	±0
Asturian Nationalist Council (CNA)	8,309	0.55	New	0	±0
Falangist Unity–Independent Spanish Phalanx (UF–FI–AT)	7,768	0.51	New	0	±0
Spanish Socialist Workers' Party (historical) (PSOEh)	5,134	0.34	New	0	±0
Spanish Phalanx of the CNSO (Authentic) (FE–JONS(A))	5,086	0.34	New	0	±0
Republican Left (IR)	4,420	0.29	New	0	±0
Blank ballots	7,493	1.42			
Total	1,514,164			4	±0
Valid votes	528,387	96.92			
Invalid votes	16,792	3.08			
Votes cast / turnout	545,179	62.74			
Abstentions	323,714	37.26			
Registered voters	868,893				
Sources
Footnotes: ^{1} Spanish Socialist Workers' Party results are compared to the combined totals of Democratic Senate and People's Socialist Party–Socialist Unity in the 1977 election.; ^{2} Democratic Coalition results are compared to People's Alliance totals in the 1977 election.; ^{3} National Union results are compared to National Alliance July 18 totals in the 1977 election.; ^{4} Communist Movement–Organization of Communist Left results are compared to Regionalist Unity totals in the 1977 election.

=== 1978 by-election ===
After the resignation of Wenceslao Roces due to disagreement with the direction of the Communist Party of Spain, a by-election was called to elect a new senator in Oviedo. This election was held concurrently with a by-election in Alicante.

Summary of the 17 May 1978 Senate of Spain by-election results in Oviedo
Parties and alliances	Popular vote			Seats	
Parties and alliances	Votes	%	±pp	Total	+/−
Spanish Socialist Workers' Party (PSOE)^{1}	122,419	32.70	n/a	1	+1
Union of the Democratic Centre (UCD)	87,946	23.49	−6.93	0	±0
Communist Party of Spain (PCE)^{1}	86,932	23.22	n/a	0	−1
People's Alliance (AP)	55,372	14.79	+1.81	0	±0
Traditionalist Communion (CT)	8,774	2.34	+1.07	0	±0
Communist Movement (MC)^{2}	6,099	1.63	−1.34	0	±0
Workers' Revolutionary Organization (ORT)	3,328	0.89	New	0	±0
Independent Spanish Phalanx (FEI)	2,728	0.73	New	0	±0
Revolutionary Communist League (LCR)	815	0.22	New	0	±0
Blank ballots	0	0.00			
Total	374,413			1	±0
Valid votes	374,413	100.00			
Invalid votes	0	0.00			
Votes cast / turnout	374,413	47.87			
Abstentions	407,653	52.13			
Registered voters	782,066				
Sources
Footnotes: ^{1} Within the Democratic Senate alliance in the 1977 election.; ^{2} Communist Movement results are compared to Regionalist Unity totals in the 1977 election.

=== 1977 ===
Summary of the 15 June 1977 Senate of Spain election results in Oviedo
Parties and alliances	Popular vote			Seats	
Parties and alliances	Votes	%	±pp	Total	+/−
Democratic Senate (SD)	679,590	39.85	n/a	3	n/a
Union of the Democratic Centre (UCD)	518,850	30.42	n/a	1	n/a
People's Alliance (AP)	221,307	12.98	n/a	0	n/a
People's Socialist Party–Socialist Unity (PSP–US)	177,795	10.43	n/a	0	n/a
Regionalist Unity (UR)	50,698	2.97	n/a	0	n/a
National Alliance July 18 (AN18)	22,435	1.32	n/a	0	n/a
Traditionalist Communion (CT)	21,641	1.27	n/a	0	n/a
Labour Federation (FL)	13,109	0.77	n/a	0	n/a
Blank ballots			n/a		
Total	1,705,425			4	n/a
Valid votes			n/a		
Invalid votes			n/a		
Votes cast / turnout			n/a		
Abstentions			n/a		
Registered voters	783,206				

== Bibliography ==
- Ley 1/1977, de 4 de enero, para la Reforma Política (Fundamental Law 1/1977). Official State Gazette (in Spanish). 4 January 1977. BOE-A-1977-165.
- Real Decreto-ley 20/1977, de 18 de marzo, sobre Normas Electorales (Royal Decree-Law 20/1977). Official State Gazette (in Spanish). 18 March 1977. BOE-A-1977-7445.
- Constitución Española (Constitution). Official State Gazette (in Spanish). 27 December 1978. BOE-A-1978-31229.
- Ley Orgánica 5/1985, de 19 de junio, del Régimen Electoral General (Organic Law 5/1985). Official State Gazette (in Spanish). 19 June 1985. BOE-A-1985-11672.
- Carreras de Odriozola, Albert; Tafunell Sambola, Xavier (2005) [1989]. Estadísticas históricas de España, siglos XIX-XX (PDF) (in Spanish). Vol. 1 (II ed.). Bilbao: Fundación BBVA. pp. 1072–1097. ISBN 84-96515-00-1. Archived from the original (PDF) on 24 September 2015.
