= Alicante (Senate constituency) =

Senate constituency in Spain

Coordinates: 38°30′N 0°30′W

- Senate of Spain; Electoral constituency
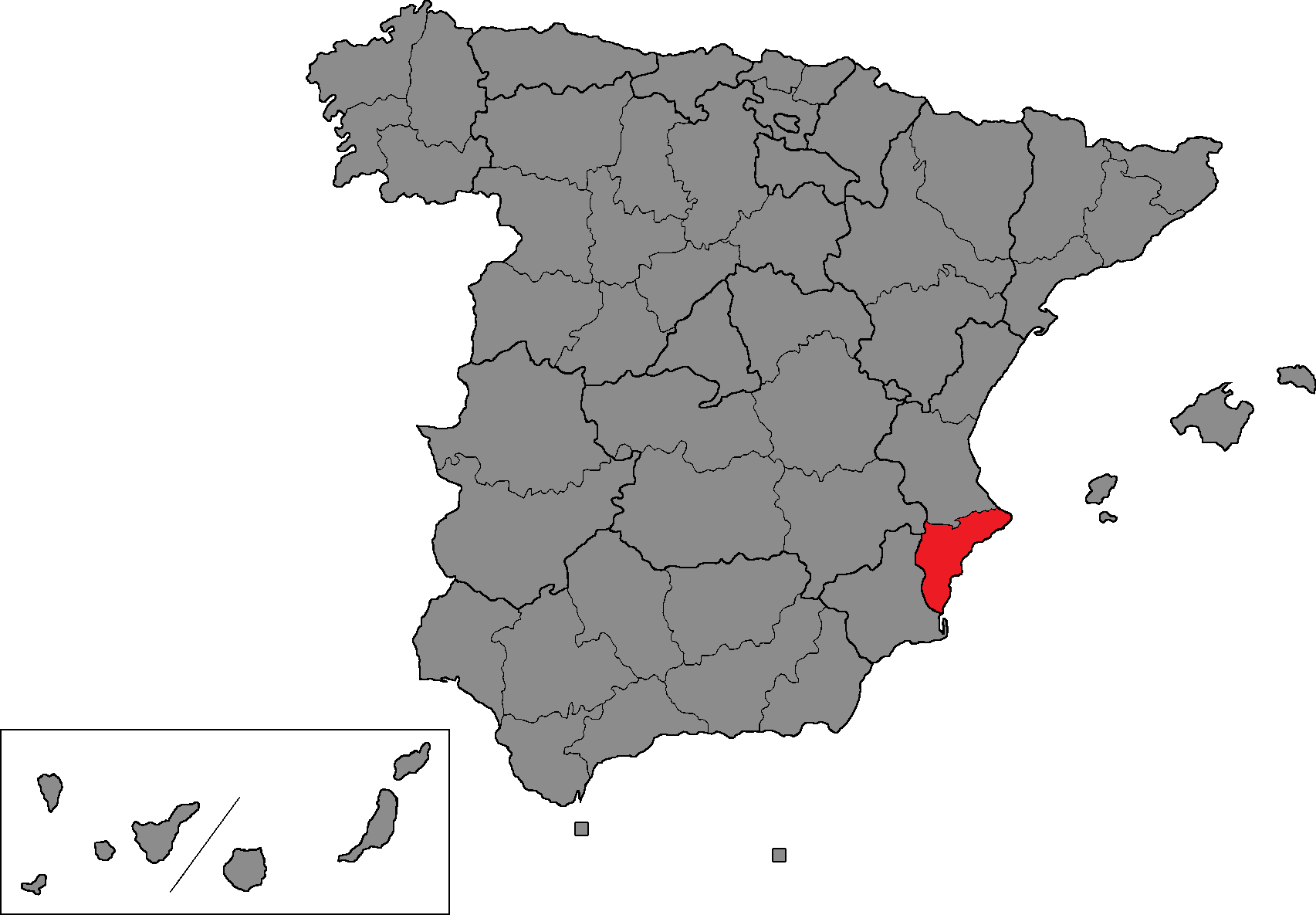
- Location of Alicante within Spain
- Province: Alicante
- Autonomous community: Valencian Community
- Population: ▲1,991,259 (2024)
- Electorate: ▲1,306,311 (2023)
- Major settlements: Alicante, Elche, Alcoy, Elda, Benidorm, Orihuela

Current constituency
- Created: 1977
- Seats: 4
- Members: PP (3); PSOE (1)

Alicante (Valencian: Alacant) is one of the 60 constituencies represented in the Senate of Spain, the upper chamber of the Spanish parliament, the Cortes Generales. The constituency (whose boundaries correspond to those of the homonymous province) elects four senators. The electoral system uses open-list (Note: Parties can group candidates into lists, although each candidate is treated separately for the purpose of the voting procedure.) partial block voting, with electors voting for individual candidates instead of parties. Electors can vote for up to three candidates.

== Electoral system ==
The constituency was created as per the Political Reform Law and was first contested in the 1977 general election. The Law provided for the provinces of Spain to be established as multi-member districts in the Senate, with this regulation being maintained under the Spanish Constitution of 1978. Additionally, the Constitution requires for any modification of the provincial limits to be approved under an organic law, needing an absolute majority in the Cortes Generales.

Voting is based on universal suffrage, comprising all Spanish nationals over 18 years of age with full political rights, provided that they have not been deprived of the right to vote by a final sentence. The only exception was in 1977, when this was limited to nationals over 21 years of age and in full enjoyment of their political and civil rights. Amendments in 2011 required non-resident citizens to apply for voting, a system known as "begged" voting (Spanish: Voto rogado). which was abolished in 2022. Further, amendments in 2018 granted the right to vote to those legally incapacitated. 209 Senate seats (207 in 1977, 208 from 1978 to 2026) are elected using open-list partial block voting: voters in constituencies electing four seats can choose up to three candidates; in those with two or three seats, up to two; and in single-member districts, one. Each of the 47 peninsular provinces is allocated four seats, while in insular provinces—such as the Balearic and Canary Islands—the districts are the islands themselves, with the larger ones (Mallorca, Gran Canaria and Tenerife) being allocated three seats each, and the smaller ones (Menorca, Ibiza, Formentera, Fuerteventura, La Gomera, El Hierro, Lanzarote and La Palma) one each. (Note: La Gomera and El Hierro comprised a single constituency for the 1977 election. A constitutional reform in 2026 awarded Formentera an independent senator separate from Ibiza.) Ceuta and Melilla elect two seats each. Until 1985, the law also provided for by-elections to fill Senate seats vacated up to two years into the legislature; subsequently, any vacancies arising after the proclamation of candidates and during the legislative term are filled by the next candidates on the party lists or, when required, by designated substitutes.

The electoral law allows for parties and federations registered in the interior ministry, alliances and groupings of electors to present lists of candidates. Parties and federations intending to form an alliance are required to inform the relevant electoral commission within 10 days of the election call—15 before 1985—whereas groupings of electors need to secure the signature of at least one percent of the electorate in the constituencies for which they seek election—one permille of the electorate, with a compulsory minimum of 500 signatures, until 1985—disallowing electors from signing for more than one list. Also since 2011, parties, federations or alliances that have not obtained a mandate in either chamber of the Cortes at the preceding election are required to secure the signature of at least 0.1 percent of electors in the aforementioned constituencies. Amendments in 2007 required a balanced composition of men and women in the electoral lists, so that candidates of either sex made up at least 40 percent of the total composition; further amendments in 2024 required the use of a zipper system.

== Senators ==
Senators for Alicante 1977–
Key to parties ALV PSP PSOE UCD PP CP AP
Legislature	Election	Distribution
Constituent	1977	1 / 2 / 1
Constituent	1978	1 / 2 / 1
1st	1979	3 / 1
2nd	1982	3 / 1
3rd	1986	3 / 1
4th	1989	3 / 1
5th	1993	1 / 3
6th	1996	1 / 3
7th	2000	1 / 3
8th	2004	1 / 3
9th	2008	1 / 3
10th	2011	1 / 3
11th	2015	1 / 3
12th	2016	1 / 3
13th	2019 (Apr)	3 / 1
14th	2019 (Nov)	2 / 2
15th	2023	1 / 3

== General elections ==
=== 2023 ===
Summary of the 23 July 2023 Senate of Spain election results in Alicante
Parties and alliances	Popular vote			Seats	
Parties and alliances	Votes	%	±pp	Total	+/−
People's Party (PP)	987,289	38.88	+6.71	3	+1
Spanish Socialist Workers' Party (PSOE)	852,855	33.58	+1.81	1	–1
Vox (Vox)	351,173	13.83	+7.08	0	±0
Commitment–Unite: We Unite to Win (Sumar–Compromís)^{1}	295,543	11.64	–4.85	0	±0
Animalist Party with the Environment (PACMA)^{2}	30,914	1.22	–0.56	0	±0
Walking Together (CJ)	4,548	0.18	New	0	±0
Zero Cuts (Recortes Cero)	3,081	0.12	–0.06	0	±0
Blank ballots (Note: The percentage of blank ballots is calculated over the official number of valid votes cast, irrespective of the total number of votes shown as a result of adding up the individual results for each party.)	14,051	1.59	–0.17		
Total	2,539,454			4	±0
Valid votes	886,241	97.68	+0.04		
Invalid votes	21,088	2.32	–0.04		
Votes cast / turnout	907,329	69.46	+2.22		
Abstentions	398,982	30.54	–2.22		
Registered voters	1,306,311				
Sources
Footnotes: ^{1} Commitment–Unite: We Unite to Win results are compared to the combined totals of United We Can and More Commitment in the November 2019 election.; ^{2} Animalist Party with the Environment results are compared to Animalist Party Against Mistreatment of Animals totals in the November 2019 election.

=== November 2019 ===
Summary of the 10 November 2019 Senate of Spain election results in Alicante
Parties and alliances	Popular vote			Seats	
Parties and alliances	Votes	%	±pp	Total	+/−
People's Party (PP)	719,392	32.17	+8.96	2	+1
Spanish Socialist Workers' Party (PSOE)	710,448	31.77	+2.21	2	–1
United We Can (Podemos–EUPV)	266,791	11.93	–0.30	0	±0
Citizens–Party of the Citizenry (Cs)	214,152	9.58	–6.44	0	±0
Vox (Vox)	150,888	6.75	–4.22	0	±0
More Commitment (Més Compromís)^{1}	101,919	4.56	+0.06	0	±0
Animalist Party Against Mistreatment of Animals (PACMA)	39,702	1.78	–0.23	0	±0
The Eco-pacifist Greens–Forward (Avant/Adelante–LVEP)	5,493	0.25	–0.06	0	±0
Zero Cuts–Green Group (Recortes Cero–GV)	4,023	0.18	–0.04	0	±0
Republican Left of the Valencian Country (ERPV)	3,449	0.15	+0.05	0	±0
Communist Party of the Peoples of Spain (PCPE)	2,490	0.11	±0.00	0	±0
For a Fairer World (PUM+J)	1,690	0.08	New	0	±0
Libertarian Party (P–LIB)	1,146	0.05	+0.01	0	±0
Blank ballots	14,717	1.76	–0.26		
Total	2,236,300			4	±0
Valid votes	838,203	97.64	+0.84		
Invalid votes	20,227	2.36	–0.84		
Votes cast / turnout	858,430	67.24	–4.84		
Abstentions	418,261	32.76	+4.84		
Registered voters	1,276,691				
Sources
Footnotes: ^{1} More Commitment results are compared to Commitment: Bloc–Initiative–Greens Equo totals in the April 2019 election.

=== April 2019 ===
Summary of the 28 April 2019 Senate of Spain election results in Alicante
Parties and alliances	Popular vote			Seats	
Parties and alliances	Votes	%	±pp	Total	+/−
Spanish Socialist Workers' Party (PSOE)	745,217	29.56	+7.47	3	+3
People's Party (PP)	585,193	23.21	–15.56	1	–2
Citizens–Party of the Citizenry (Cs)	403,808	16.02	+3.23	0	±0
United We Can (Podemos–EUPV)^{1}	308,403	12.23	–10.26	0	–1
Vox (Vox)	276,466	10.97	+10.64	0	±0
Commitment: Bloc–Initiative–Greens Equo (Compromís 2019)	113,316	4.50	New	0	±0
Animalist Party Against Mistreatment of Animals (PACMA)	50,721	2.01	+0.15	0	±0
The Eco-pacifist Greens–Forward (Avant/Adelante–LVEP)^{2}	7,773	0.31	–0.04	0	±0
Zero Cuts–Green Group (Recortes Cero–GV)	5,475	0.22	+0.01	0	±0
Communist Party of the Peoples of Spain (PCPE)	2,790	0.11	+0.01	0	±0
Republican Left of the Valencian Country (ERPV)	2,593	0.10	New	0	±0
Libertarian Party (P–LIB)	1,107	0.04	+0.01	0	±0
Blank ballots	17,934	2.02	–0.24		
Total	2,520,796			4	±0
Valid votes	888,180	96.80	–0.95		
Invalid votes	29,347	3.20	+0.95		
Votes cast / turnout	917,527	72.08	+2.22		
Abstentions	355,401	27.92	–2.22		
Registered voters	1,272,928				
Sources
Footnotes: ^{1} United We Can results are compared to The Valencian Way totals in the 2016 election.; ^{2} The Eco-pacifist Greens–Forward results are compared to The Eco-pacifist Greens totals in the 2016 election.

=== 2016 ===
Summary of the 26 June 2016 Senate of Spain election results in Alicante
Parties and alliances	Popular vote			Seats	
Parties and alliances	Votes	%	±pp	Total	+/−
People's Party (PP)	943,569	38.77	+4.11	3	±0
The Valencian Way (Podemos–Compromís–EUPV)^{1}	547,386	22.49	–1.27	1	+1
Spanish Socialist Workers' Party (PSOE)	537,699	22.09	–0.57	0	–1
Citizens–Party of the Citizenry (C's)	311,396	12.79	–0.81	0	±0
Animalist Party Against Mistreatment of Animals (PACMA)	45,291	1.86	+0.18	0	±0
The Eco-pacifist Greens (Centro Moderado)	8,401	0.35	–0.04	0	±0
Vox (Vox)	8,134	0.33	–0.08	0	±0
Zero Cuts–Green Group (Recortes Cero–GV)	5,145	0.21	±0.00	0	±0
Union, Progress and Democracy (UPyD)	4,430	0.18	–0.58	0	±0
Communist Party of the Peoples of Spain (PCPE)	2,344	0.10	–0.13	0	±0
Libertarian Party (P–LIB)	799	0.03	–0.02	0	±0
Blank ballots	19,305	2.26	–1.83		
Total	2,433,899			4	±0
Valid votes	855,854	97.75	+1.10		
Invalid votes	19,699	2.25	–1.10		
Votes cast / turnout	875,553	69.86	–1.65		
Abstentions	377,743	30.14	+1.65		
Registered voters	1,253,296				
Sources
Footnotes: ^{1} The Valencian Way results are compared to the combined totals of It is Time and United Left of the Valencian Country–Popular Unity in Common in the 2015 election.

=== 2015 ===
Summary of the 20 December 2015 Senate of Spain election results in Alicante
Parties and alliances	Popular vote			Seats	
Parties and alliances	Votes	%	±pp	Total	+/−
People's Party (PP)	837,024	34.66		3	±0
Spanish Socialist Workers' Party (PSOE)	547,192	22.66		1	±0
It is Time (Podemos–Compromís)^{1}	494,379	20.47		0	±0
Citizens–Party of the Citizenry (C's)	328,461	13.60	New	0	±0
United Left of the Valencian Country–Popular Unity in Common (EUPV–UPeC)	79,492	3.29		0	±0
Animalist Party Against Mistreatment of Animals (PACMA)	40,478	1.68		0	±0
Union, Progress and Democracy (UPyD)	18,451	0.76		0	±0
Vox (Vox)	9,884	0.41	New	0	±0
The Eco-pacifist Greens (Centro Moderado)	9,440	0.39	New	0	±0
Communist Party of the Peoples of Spain (PCPE)	5,583	0.23		0	±0
Zero Cuts–Green Group (Recortes Cero–GV)	5,047	0.21	New	0	±0
Valencian Country Now (Ara PV)^{2}	1,700	0.07		0	±0
Democratic Forum (FDEE)	1,222	0.05	New	0	±0
Libertarian Party (P–LIB)	1,114	0.05	New	0	±0
Blank ballots	35,423	4.09			
Total	2,414,890			4	±0
Valid votes	865,298	96.65			
Invalid votes	29,952	3.35			
Votes cast / turnout	895,250	71.51			
Abstentions	356,691	28.49			
Registered voters	1,251,941				
Sources
Footnotes: ^{1} It is Time results are compared to Commitment Coalition–Equo totals in the 2011 election.; ^{2} Valencian Country Now results are compared to Republican Left of the Valencian Country totals in the 2011 election.

=== 1978 by-election ===
After the death of Julián Andúgar, a by-election was called to elect a new senator in Alicante. This election was held concurrently with a by-election in Oviedo.

Summary of the 17 May 1978 Senate of Spain by-election results in Alicante
Parties and alliances	Popular vote			Seats	
Parties and alliances	Votes	%	±pp	Total	+/−
Spanish Socialist Workers' Party (PSOE)^{1}	120,322	36.27	–14.06	1	±0
Union of the Democratic Centre (UCD)	108,617	32.74	–1.48	0	±0
Communist Party of Spain (PCE)	57,306	17.27	New	0	±0
People's Alliance (AP)	35,752	10.78	+3.35	0	±0
Workers' Revolutionary Organization (ORT)	5,887	1.77	New	0	±0
Liberal Progressive Party (PPL)	3,846	1.16	New	0	±0
Blank ballots	0	0.00			
Total	331,730			1	±0
Valid votes	331,730	100.00			
Invalid votes	0	0.00			
Votes cast / turnout	331,730				
Abstentions					
Registered voters					
Sources
Footnotes: ^{1} Spanish Socialist Workers' Party results are compared to the combined totals of Spanish Socialist Workers' Party and People's Socialist Party–Socialist Unity in the 1977 election.

=== 1977 ===
Summary of the 15 June 1977 Congress of Deputies election results in Alicante
Parties and alliances	Popular vote			Seats	
Parties and alliances	Votes	%	±pp	Total	+/−
Spanish Socialist Workers' Party (PSOE)	585,519	37.34	n/a	2	n/a
Union of the Democratic Centre (UCD)	536,584	34.22	n/a	1	n/a
People's Socialist Party–Socialist Unity (PSP–US)	203,683	12.99	n/a	1	n/a
People's Alliance (AP)	116,465	7.43	n/a	0	n/a
Democratic Socialist Alliance (ASDCI)	40,758	2.60	n/a	0	n/a
Christian Democratic Team of the Spanish State (FDC–UDPV)	35,982	2.29	n/a	0	n/a
Spanish Social Reform (RSE)	27,190	1.73	n/a	0	n/a
National Alliance July 18 (AN18)	21,823	1.39	n/a	0	n/a
Blank ballots			n/a		
Total	1,568,004			4	n/a
Valid votes			n/a		
Invalid votes			n/a		
Votes cast / turnout			n/a		
Abstentions			n/a		
Registered voters	677,156				

== Bibliography ==
- Ley 1/1977, de 4 de enero, para la Reforma Política (Fundamental Law 1/1977). Official State Gazette (in Spanish). 4 January 1977. BOE-A-1977-165.
- Real Decreto-ley 20/1977, de 18 de marzo, sobre Normas Electorales (Royal Decree-Law 20/1977). Official State Gazette (in Spanish). 18 March 1977. BOE-A-1977-7445.
- Constitución Española (Constitution). Official State Gazette (in Spanish). 27 December 1978. BOE-A-1978-31229.
- Ley Orgánica 5/1985, de 19 de junio, del Régimen Electoral General (Organic Law 5/1985). Official State Gazette (in Spanish). 19 June 1985. BOE-A-1985-11672.
- Carreras de Odriozola, Albert; Tafunell Sambola, Xavier (2005) [1989]. Estadísticas históricas de España, siglos XIX-XX (PDF) (in Spanish). Vol. 1 (II ed.). Bilbao: Fundación BBVA. pp. 1072–1097. ISBN 84-96515-00-1. Archived from the original (PDF) on 24 September 2015.
