= Madrid (Senate constituency) =

Senate of Spain constituency

Coordinates: 40°30′N 3°40′W

- Senate of Spain; Electoral constituency
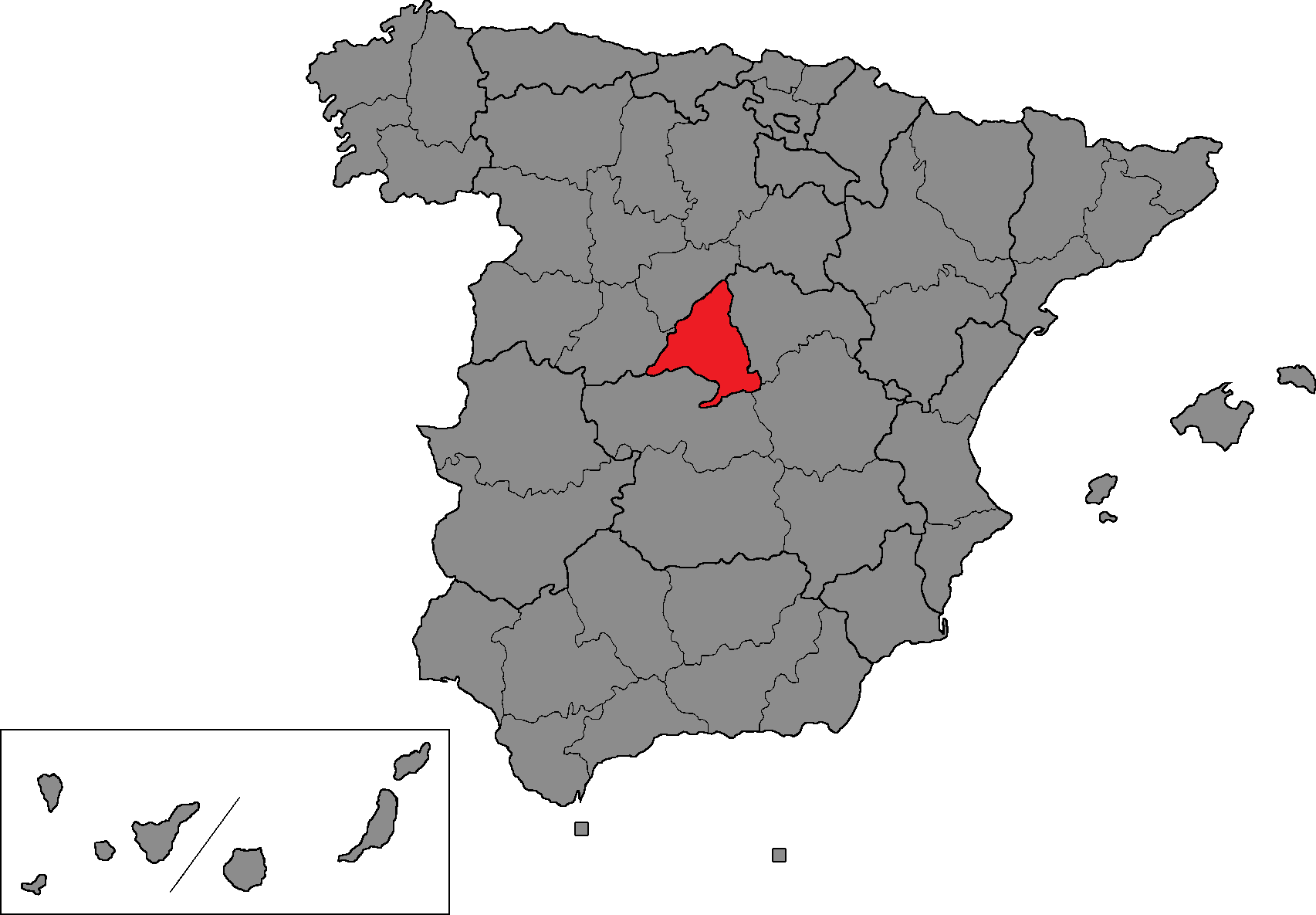
- Location of Madrid within Spain
- Province: Madrid
- Autonomous community: Community of Madrid
- Population: ▲7,001,715 (2024)
- Electorate: ▲5,224,561 (2023)
- Major settlements: Madrid, Móstoles, Alcalá de Henares, Fuenlabrada, Leganés, Getafe, Alcorcón, Torrejón de Ardoz, Parla, Alcobendas

Current constituency
- Created: 1977
- Seats: 4
- Members: PP (3); PSOE (1)

Madrid is one of the 60 constituencies represented in the Senate of Spain, the upper chamber of the Spanish parliament, the Cortes Generales. The constituency (whose boundaries correspond to those of the homonymous province) elects four senators. The electoral system uses open-list (Note: Parties can group candidates into lists, although each candidate is treated separately for the purpose of the voting procedure.) partial block voting, with electors voting for individual candidates instead of parties. Electors can vote for up to three candidates.

== Electoral system ==
The constituency was created as per the Political Reform Law and was first contested in the 1977 general election. The Law provided for the provinces of Spain to be established as multi-member districts in the Senate, with this regulation being maintained under the Spanish Constitution of 1978. Additionally, the Constitution requires for any modification of the provincial limits to be approved under an organic law, needing an absolute majority in the Cortes Generales.

Voting is based on universal suffrage, comprising all Spanish nationals over 18 years of age with full political rights, provided that they have not been deprived of the right to vote by a final sentence. The only exception was in 1977, when this was limited to nationals over 21 years of age and in full enjoyment of their political and civil rights. Amendments in 2011 required non-resident citizens to apply for voting, a system known as "begged" voting (Spanish: Voto rogado). which was abolished in 2022. Further, amendments in 2018 granted the right to vote to those legally incapacitated. 209 Senate seats (207 in 1977, 208 from 1978 to 2026) are elected using open-list partial block voting: voters in constituencies electing four seats can choose up to three candidates; in those with two or three seats, up to two; and in single-member districts, one. Each of the 47 peninsular provinces is allocated four seats, while in insular provinces—such as the Balearic and Canary Islands—the districts are the islands themselves, with the larger ones (Mallorca, Gran Canaria and Tenerife) being allocated three seats each, and the smaller ones (Menorca, Ibiza, Formentera, Fuerteventura, La Gomera, El Hierro, Lanzarote and La Palma) one each. (Note: La Gomera and El Hierro comprised a single constituency for the 1977 election. A constitutional reform in 2026 awarded Formentera an independent senator separate from Ibiza.) Ceuta and Melilla elect two seats each. Until 1985, the law also provided for by-elections to fill Senate seats vacated up to two years into the legislature; subsequently, any vacancies arising after the proclamation of candidates and during the legislative term are filled by the next candidates on the party lists or, when required, by designated substitutes.

The electoral law allows for parties and federations registered in the interior ministry, alliances and groupings of electors to present lists of candidates. Parties and federations intending to form an alliance are required to inform the relevant electoral commission within 10 days of the election call—15 before 1985—whereas groupings of electors need to secure the signature of at least one percent of the electorate in the constituencies for which they seek election—one permille of the electorate, with a compulsory minimum of 500 signatures, until 1985—disallowing electors from signing for more than one list. Also since 2011, parties, federations or alliances that have not obtained a mandate in either chamber of the Cortes at the preceding election are required to secure the signature of at least 0.1 percent of electors in the aforementioned constituencies. Amendments in 2007 required a balanced composition of men and women in the electoral lists, so that candidates of either sex made up at least 40 percent of the total composition; further amendments in 2024 required the use of a zipper system.

== Senators ==
Senators for Madrid 1977–
Key to parties Pod. PSP SpD PSOE Cs UCD PP CP AP
Legislature	Election	Distribution
Constituent	1977	1 / 3
1st	1979	2 / 2
2nd	1982	3 / 1
3rd	1986	3 / 1
4th	1989	1 / 3
5th	1993	1 / 3
6th	1996	1 / 3
7th	2000	1 / 3
8th	2004	1 / 3
9th	2008	1 / 3
10th	2011	1 / 3
11th	2015	1 / 3
12th	2016	1 / 3
13th	2019 (Apr)	2 / 1 / 1
14th	2019 (Nov)	2 / 2
15th	2023	1 / 3

== General elections ==
=== 2023 ===
Summary of the 23 July 2023 Senate of Spain election results in Madrid
Parties and alliances	Popular vote			Seats	
Parties and alliances	Votes	%	±pp	Total	+/−
People's Party (PP)	4,427,681	42.69	+8.23	3	+1
Spanish Socialist Workers' Party (PSOE)	3,051,941	29.42	−1.08	1	−1
Unite (Sumar)^{1}	1,444,204	13.92	−1.74	0	±0
Vox (Vox)	1,241,194	11.97	+5.88	0	±0
Animalist Party with the Environment (PACMA)^{2}	90,304	0.87	−0.88	0	±0
For a Fairer World (PUM+J)	17,733	0.17	+0.04	0	±0
Humanist Party (PH)	14,986	0.14	−0.13	0	±0
Zero Cuts (Recortes Cero)	14,938	0.14	−0.07	0	±0
Communist Party of the Workers of Spain (PCTE)	12,980	0.13	New	0	±0
Spanish Phalanx of the CNSO (FE de las JONS)	7,318	0.07	New	0	±0
Blank ballots (Note: The percentage of blank ballots is calculated over the official number of valid votes cast, irrespective of the total number of votes shown as a result of adding up the individual results for each party.)	48,887	1.37	−0.28		
Total	10,372,166			4	±0
Valid votes	3,574,585	98.42	−0.01		
Invalid votes	57,422	1.58	+0.01		
Votes cast / turnout	3,632,007	69.52	−0.80		
Abstentions	1,592,554	30.48	+0.80		
Registered voters	5,224,561				
Sources
Footnotes: ^{1} Unite results are compared to the combined totals of United We Can and More Country–Equo in the November 2019 election.; ^{2} Animalist Party with the Environment results are compared to Animalist Party Against Mistreatment of Animals totals in the November 2019 election.

=== November 2019 ===
Summary of the 10 November 2019 Senate of Spain election results in Madrid
Parties and alliances	Popular vote			Seats	
Parties and alliances	Votes	%	±pp	Total	+/−
People's Party (PP)	3,335,762	34.46	+12.63	2	+1
Spanish Socialist Workers' Party (PSOE)	2,951,980	30.50	+2.70	2	±0
United We Can (Podemos–IU)	1,321,119	13.65	−1.77	0	±0
Citizens–Party of the Citizenry (Cs)	980,431	10.13	−10.31	0	−1
Vox (Vox)	589,389	6.09	−5.08	0	±0
More Country–Equo (Más País–Equo)	194,510	2.01	New	0	±0
Animalist Party Against Mistreatment of Animals (PACMA)	169,838	1.75	−0.42	0	±0
Humanist Party (PH)	26,308	0.27	+0.09	0	±0
Communist Party of the Peoples of Spain (PCPE)	20,143	0.21	New	0	±0
Zero Cuts–Green Group–PCAS–TC (Recortes Cero–GV–PCAS–TC)	19,876	0.21	−0.13	0	±0
For a Fairer World (PUM+J)	12,659	0.13	−0.04	0	±0
Blank ballots	58,072	1.65	+0.25		
Total	9,680,087			4	±0
Valid votes	3,521,712	98.43	+0.04		
Invalid votes	56,348	1.57	−0.04		
Votes cast / turnout	3,578,060	70.32	−4.95		
Abstentions	1,510,033	29.68	+4.95		
Registered voters	5,088,093				

=== April 2019 ===
Summary of the 28 April 2019 Senate of Spain election results in Madrid
Parties and alliances	Popular vote			Seats	
Parties and alliances	Votes	%	±pp	Total	+/−
Spanish Socialist Workers' Party (PSOE)	3,024,740	27.80	+7.29	2	+1
People's Party (PP)	2,375,330	21.83	−17.97	1	−2
Citizens–Party of the Citizenry (Cs)	2,224,092	20.44	+5.88	1	+1
United We Can (Podemos–IU–Equo)	1,677,306	15.42	−4.77	0	±0
Vox (Vox)	1,215,649	11.17	+10.51	0	±0
Animalist Party Against Mistreatment of Animals (PACMA)	236,010	2.17	+0.21	0	±0
Zero Cuts–Green Group–PCAS–TC (Recortes Cero–GV–PCAS–TC)	37,333	0.34	+0.04	0	±0
Humanist Party (PH)	19,611	0.18	+0.11	0	±0
For a Fairer World (PUM+J)	18,250	0.17	New	0	±0
Blank ballots	52,491	1.40	−0.78		
Total	10,880,812			4	±0
Valid votes	3,743,556	98.39	+0.10		
Invalid votes	61,072	1.61	−0.10		
Votes cast / turnout	3,804,628	75.27	+5.14		
Abstentions	1,250,327	24.73	−5.14		
Registered voters	5,054,955				

=== 2016 ===
Summary of the 26 June 2016 Senate of Spain election results in Madrid
Parties and alliances	Popular vote			Seats	
Parties and alliances	Votes	%	±pp	Total	+/−
People's Party (PP)	3,887,927	39.80	+5.09	3	±0
Spanish Socialist Workers' Party (PSOE)	2,003,379	20.51	+2.37	1	+1
United We Can (Podemos–IU–Equo–CLI–AS)^{1}	1,971,854	20.19	−5.08	0	−1
Citizens–Party of the Citizenry (C's)	1,421,736	14.56	−0.11	0	±0
Animalist Party Against Mistreatment of Animals (PACMA)	191,183	1.96	+0.33	0	±0
Union, Progress and Democracy (UPyD)	82,864	0.85	−1.51	0	±0
Vox (Vox)	64,456	0.66	−0.20	0	±0
Zero Cuts–Green Group (Recortes Cero–GV)	29,062	0.30	+0.06	0	±0
Spanish Phalanx of the CNSO (FE de las JONS)	18,530	0.19	−0.08	0	±0
Communist Party of the Peoples of Spain (PCPE)	9,227	0.09	−0.04	0	±0
Humanist Party (PH)	6,865	0.07	−0.02	0	±0
Internationalist Solidarity and Self-Management (SAIn)	4,107	0.04	+0.01	0	±0
Libertarian Party (P–LIB)	2,485	0.03	±0.00	0	±0
Blank ballots	73,936	2.18	−1.86		
Total	9,767,611			4	±0
Valid votes	3,396,870	98.29	+0.61		
Invalid votes	59,197	1.71	−0.61		
Votes cast / turnout	3,456,067	70.13	−2.50		
Abstentions	1,471,865	29.87	+2.50		
Registered voters	4,927,932				
Sources
Footnotes: ^{1} United We Can results are compared to the combined totals of We Can and United Left–Popular Unity in Common in the 2015 election.

=== 2015 ===
Summary of the 20 December 2015 Senate of Spain election results in Madrid
Parties and alliances	Popular vote			Seats	
Parties and alliances	Votes	%	±pp	Total	+/−
People's Party (PP)	3,448,787	34.71	−19.99	3	±0
We Can (Podemos)	1,986,835	20.00	New	1	+1
Spanish Socialist Workers' Party (PSOE)	1,801,950	18.14	−9.26	0	−1
Citizens–Party of the Citizenry (C's)	1,457,771	14.67	New	0	±0
United Left–Popular Unity in Common (IU–UPeC)	523,154	5.27	−2.14	0	±0
Union, Progress and Democracy (UPyD)	234,816	2.36	−1.14	0	±0
Animalist Party Against Mistreatment of Animals (PACMA)	161,786	1.63	+0.87	0	±0
Vox (Vox)	85,453	0.86	New	0	±0
Spanish Phalanx of the CNSO (FE de las JONS)	26,403	0.27	New	0	±0
Zero Cuts–Green Group (Recortes Cero–GV)	24,294	0.24	New	0	±0
For a Fairer World (PUM+J)	16,467	0.17	−0.16	0	±0
Communist Party of the Peoples of Spain (PCPE)	12,778	0.13	−0.18	0	±0
Humanist Party (PH)	8,695	0.09	−0.07	0	±0
Libertarian Party (P–LIB)	2,969	0.03	−0.04	0	±0
Internationalist Solidarity and Self-Management (SAIn)	2,501	0.03	−0.02	0	±0
Blank ballots	140,859	4.04	−1.37		
Total	9,935,518			4	±0
Valid votes	3,486,122	97.68	+0.98		
Invalid votes	82,868	2.32	−0.98		
Votes cast / turnout	3,568,990	72.63	+0.08		
Abstentions	1,344,903	27.37	−0.08		
Registered voters	4,913,893				

=== 2011 ===
Summary of the 20 November 2011 Senate of Spain election results in Madrid
Parties and alliances	Popular vote			Seats	
Parties and alliances	Votes	%	±pp	Total	+/−
People's Party (PP)	4,865,503	54.70	+4.09	3	±0
Spanish Socialist Workers' Party (PSOE)	2,437,158	27.40	−11.46	1	±0
United Left–The Greens: Plural Left (IU–LV)	659,147	7.41	+2.60	0	±0
Union, Progress and Democracy (UPyD)	311,467	3.50	+1.07	0	±0
Equo (Equo)	188,445	2.12	New	0	±0
Blank Seats (EB)	75,410	0.85	New	0	±0
Animalist Party Against Mistreatment of Animals (PACMA)	67,360	0.76	+0.61	0	±0
For a Fairer World (PUM+J)	29,298	0.33	+0.18	0	±0
Communist Party of the Peoples of Spain (PCPE)	27,836	0.31	+0.19	0	±0
Asturias Forum (FAC)	27,382	0.31	New	0	±0
Humanist Party (PH)	14,359	0.16	+0.12	0	±0
Individual Freedom Party (P–LIB)	6,414	0.07	New	0	±0
Internationalist Socialist Workers' Party (POSI)	4,545	0.05	+0.03	0	±0
Internationalist Solidarity and Self-Management (SAIn)	4,486	0.05	+0.03	0	±0
Blank ballots	176,575	5.41	+3.46		
Total	8,895,385			4	±0
Valid votes	3,265,042	96.70	−1.28		
Invalid votes	111,395	3.30	+1.28		
Votes cast / turnout	3,376,437	72.55	−7.05		
Abstentions	1,277,342	27.45	+7.05		
Registered voters	4,653,779				

=== 2008 ===
Summary of the 9 March 2008 Senate of Spain election results in Madrid
Parties and alliances	Popular vote			Seats	
Parties and alliances	Votes	%	±pp	Total	+/−
People's Party (PP)	5,050,517	50.61	+5.34	3	±0
Spanish Socialist Workers' Party (PSOE)	3,877,521	38.86	−4.96	1	±0
United Left of the Community of Madrid–Alternative (IUCM)	480,436	4.81	−1.63	0	±0
Union, Progress and Democracy (UPyD)	242,411	2.43	New	0	±0
The Greens–Green Group (LV–GV)	50,494	0.51	New	0	±0
The Greens of the Community of Madrid–The Greens of Europe (LVCM–LVdE)	23,896	0.24	−0.05	0	±0
Citizens–Party of the Citizenry (C's)	22,077	0.22	New	0	±0
Carlist Party (PC)	18,274	0.18	New	0	±0
Anti-Bullfighting Party Against Mistreatment of Animals (PACMA)	15,028	0.15	+0.06	0	±0
For a Fairer World (PUM+J)	15,015	0.15	New	0	±0
Communist Party of the Peoples of Spain (PCPE)	11,532	0.12	+0.02	0	±0
National Alliance (AN)	10,197	0.10	+0.08	0	±0
Alternative in Blank (ABLA)	10,188	0.10	New	0	±0
Non-Smokers' Party (PNF)	7,000	0.07	New	0	±0
Spanish Alternative (AES)	6,629	0.07	New	0	±0
Engine and Sports Alternative (AMD)	6,497	0.07	New	0	±0
National Democracy (DN)	5,657	0.06	−0.07	0	±0
Family and Life Party (PFyV)	5,650	0.06	+0.01	0	±0
Spanish Phalanx of the CNSO (FE de las JONS)	4,791	0.05	−0.11	0	±0
Spanish Democratic Centre (CDEs)	4,003	0.04	New	0	±0
Citizen Union for Democracy (UCiD)	3,999	0.04	New	0	±0
Commoners' Land (TC)	3,933	0.04	−0.01	0	±0
Humanist Party (PH)	3,833	0.04	−0.03	0	±0
Natural Culture (CN)	3,687	0.04	+0.02	0	±0
Spain 2000 (E-2000)	3,451	0.03	+0.01	0	±0
Union for Leganés (ULEG)	3,096	0.03	New	0	±0
Join Action (AY)	3,000	0.03	−0.65	0	±0
Social Democratic Party (PSD)	2,446	0.02	New	0	±0
Spanish Front (Frente)	2,339	0.02	New	0	±0
Authentic Phalanx (FA)	2,003	0.02	+0.01	0	±0
Nation and Revolution (NyR)	1,842	0.02	New	0	±0
Internationalist Solidarity and Self-Management (SAIn)	1,759	0.02	New	0	±0
Carlist Traditionalist Communion (CTC)	1,530	0.02	±0.00	0	±0
Internationalist Socialist Workers' Party (POSI)	1,529	0.02	+0.01	0	±0
Spanish Catholic Movement (MCE)	1,322	0.01	New	0	±0
Internationalist Struggle (LI (LIT–CI))	1,075	0.01	−0.09	0	±0
Commoners (comuner@s)	960	0.01	New	0	±0
Civil Liberties Party (PLCI)	712	0.01	New	0	±0
Blank ballots	68,329	1.95	−1.24		
Total	9,978,658			4	±0
Valid votes	3,501,755	97.98	−0.68		
Invalid votes	72,345	2.02	+0.68		
Votes cast / turnout	3,574,100	79.60	+0.41		
Abstentions	915,940	20.40	−0.41		
Registered voters	4,490,040				

=== 2004 ===
Summary of the 14 March 2004 Senate of Spain election results in Madrid
Parties and alliances	Popular vote			Seats	
Parties and alliances	Votes	%	±pp	Total	+/−
People's Party (PP)	4,463,067	45.27	−9.65	3	±0
Spanish Socialist Workers' Party (PSOE)	4,319,832	43.82	+16.48	1	±0
United Left of the Community of Madrid (IUCM)	634,555	6.44	−5.63	0	±0
Join Action (AY)	67,356	0.68	New	0	±0
The Greens of the Community of Madrid (LVCM)	28,788	0.29	−0.37	0	±0
The Eco-pacifist Greens (LVEP)	28,553	0.29	New	0	±0
Democratic and Social Centre (CDS)	27,145	0.28	+0.17	0	±0
Citizens for Blank Votes (CenB)	26,877	0.27	New	0	±0
Burdened and Angry Citizens (CAyC)	26,831	0.27	New	0	±0
Spanish Phalanx of the CNSO (FE de las JONS)^{1}	15,377	0.16	+0.11	0	±0
National Democracy (DN)	12,606	0.13	New	0	±0
Communist Party of the Peoples of Spain (PCPE)	9,933	0.10	−0.20	0	±0
Internationalist Struggle (LI (LIT–CI))	9,392	0.10	+0.09	0	±0
Anti-Bullfighting Party Against Mistreatment of Animals (PACMA)	8,775	0.09	New	0	±0
Party of Self-employed, Retirees and Widows (PAE)	8,673	0.09	New	0	±0
Alliance for Development and Nature (ADN)	7,807	0.08	New	0	±0
Humanist Party (PH)	6,460	0.07	−0.02	0	±0
The Phalanx (FE)	5,031	0.05	−0.03	0	±0
Commoners' Land–Castilian Nationalist Party (TC–PNC)	4,888	0.05	−0.04	0	±0
Family and Life Party (PFyV)	4,703	0.05	New	0	±0
Salamanca–Zamora–León–PREPAL (PREPAL)	3,807	0.04	New	0	±0
Clean Hands Project (PML)	3,179	0.03	+0.03	0	±0
Party Association of Widows and Legal Wives (PAVIEL)	2,950	0.03	−0.08	0	±0
Romantic Mutual Support Party (PMAR)	2,408	0.02	New	0	±0
Republican Left–Socialist Action Party (IR–PASOC)	2,310	0.02	New	0	±0
Another Democracy is Possible (ODeP)	1,856	0.02	New	0	±0
Alliance for National Unity (AUN)	1,791	0.02	New	0	±0
Natural Culture (CN)	1,767	0.02	−0.03	0	±0
Carlist Traditionalist Communion (CTC)	1,695	0.02	+0.01	0	±0
Spanish Democratic Party (PADE)	1,688	0.02	−0.02	0	±0
Spain 2000 (E–2000)	1,656	0.02	New	0	±0
Immigrants with the Right to Equality and Obligations (INDIO)	1,587	0.02	New	0	±0
Liberal Centrist Union (UCL)	1,319	0.01	New	0	±0
Internationalist Socialist Workers' Party (POSI)	945	0.01	−0.03	0	±0
Authentic Phalanx (FA)	907	0.01	New	0	±0
Carlist Party (PC)	700	0.01	−0.01	0	±0
Blank ballots	110,962	3.19	+0.14		
Total	9,858,176			4	±0
Valid votes	3,483,472	98.66	+0.14		
Invalid votes	47,282	1.34	−0.14		
Votes cast / turnout	3,530,754	79.19	+6.77		
Abstentions	927,786	20.81	−6.77		
Registered voters	4,458,540				
Sources
Footnotes: ^{1} Spanish Phalanx of the CNSO results are compared to Independent Spanish Phalanx–Phalanx 2000 totals in the 2000 election.

=== 2000 ===
Summary of the 12 March 2000 Senate of Spain election results in Madrid
Parties and alliances	Popular vote			Seats	
Parties and alliances	Votes	%	±pp	Total	+/−
People's Party (PP)	4,573,789	54.92	+5.36	3	±0
Spanish Socialist Workers' Party–Progressives (PSOE–p)	2,277,171	27.34	−4.81	1	±0
United Left of the Community of Madrid (IUCM)	1,005,564	12.07	−3.29	0	±0
Liberal Independent Group (GIL)	80,498	0.97	New	0	±0
The Greens (LV)	78,953	0.95	+0.82	0	±0
The Greens of the Community of Madrid (LVCM)	55,357	0.66	+0.52	0	±0
Communist Party of the Peoples of Spain (PCPE)	25,206	0.30	+0.24	0	±0
Alliance for Development and Nature (ADN)	15,378	0.18	New	0	±0
New Force (FN)	14,785	0.18	New	0	±0
Party of Self-employed, Retirees and Independents (EL–PAPI)	14,389	0.17	New	0	±0
Party Association of Widows and Legal Wives (PAVIEL)	9,240	0.11	New	0	±0
Centrist Union–Democratic and Social Centre (UC–CDS)	9,071	0.11	−0.28	0	±0
Commoners' Land–Castilian Nationalist Party (TC–PNC)	7,743	0.09	New	0	±0
Humanist Party (PH)	7,676	0.09	−0.09	0	±0
The Phalanx (FE)	6,834	0.08	New	0	±0
Iberian Union (UNIB)	6,760	0.08	New	0	±0
Iberian Unity (UI)	5,767	0.07	+0.06	0	±0
Republican Action (AR)	4,994	0.06	+0.03	0	±0
Independent Spanish Phalanx–Phalanx 2000 (FEI–FE 2000)	4,331	0.05	+0.01	0	±0
Madrilenian Independent Regional Party (PRIM)	4,204	0.05	−0.02	0	±0
Natural Culture (CN)	4,010	0.05	+0.01	0	±0
Natural Law Party (PLN)	3,241	0.04	New	0	±0
Internationalist Socialist Workers' Party (POSI)	3,231	0.04	New	0	±0
Spanish Democratic Party (PADE)	3,167	0.04	New	0	±0
Castilian Left (IzCa)	2,621	0.03	New	0	±0
Federal Progressives (PF)	1,787	0.02	New	0	±0
Carlist Party (PC)	1,786	0.02	New	0	±0
Liberal and Social Democratic Coalition (CSD–L)	1,741	0.02	New	0	±0
Spanish New Republicans (NURP)	1,292	0.02	New	0	±0
Andecha Astur (AA)	1,102	0.01	New	0	±0
Internationalist Struggle (LI (LIT–CI))	933	0.01	New	0	±0
Valencian Union (UV)	872	0.01	±0.00	0	±0
Carlist Traditionalist Communion (CTC)	633	0.01	New	0	±0
Clean Hands Project (PML)	0	0.00	±0.00	0	±0
Blank ballots	93,792	3.05	+0.76		
Total	8,327,918			4	±0
Valid votes	3,079,994	98.52	−0.25		
Invalid votes	46,373	1.48	+0.25		
Votes cast / turnout	3,126,367	72.42	−7.34		
Abstentions	1,190,779	27.58	+7.34		
Registered voters	4,317,146				

=== 1996 ===
Summary of the 3 March 1996 Senate of Spain election results in Madrid
Parties and alliances	Popular vote			Seats	
Parties and alliances	Votes	%	±pp	Total	+/−
People's Party (PP)	4,703,521	49.56	+5.49	3	±0
Spanish Socialist Workers' Party (PSOE)	3,050,756	32.15	−3.63	1	±0
United Left (IU)	1,457,187	15.36	+2.28	0	±0
The Greens–Green Group (LV–GV)	58,969	0.62	New	0	±0
Centrist Union (UC)	36,994	0.39	−2.65	0	±0
Humanist Party (PH)	17,296	0.18	+0.15	0	±0
The Greens of Madrid (LVM)	13,080	0.14	New	0	±0
The European Greens–The Alternative Greens (LVE)	12,207	0.13	−1.20	0	±0
Nationalist Party of Castile and León (PANCAL)	9,499	0.10	New	0	±0
Madrilenian Independent Regional Party (PRIM)	6,409	0.07	−0.05	0	±0
Authentic Spanish Phalanx (FEA)	5,581	0.06	New	0	±0
Alliance for National Unity (AUN)	5,558	0.06	New	0	±0
Communist Party of the Peoples of Spain (PCPE)	5,519	0.06	New	0	±0
Regionalist Party of the Leonese Country (PREPAL)	5,418	0.06	+0.05	0	±0
Red–Green Party (PRV)	4,895	0.05	New	0	±0
Independent Spanish Phalanx (FEI)	4,109	0.04	±0.00	0	±0
Natural Culture (CN)	3,986	0.04	+0.02	0	±0
Republican Action (AR)	2,998	0.03	−0.02	0	±0
Workers' Revolutionary Party (PRT)	2,667	0.03	New	0	±0
Join Action (AY)	2,573	0.03	New	0	±0
Republican Coalition (CR)^{1}	1,413	0.01	±0.00	0	±0
Citizen Democratic Action (ADEC)	1,187	0.01	New	0	±0
Valencian Union (UV)	900	0.01	±0.00	0	±0
Iberian Unity (UI)	883	0.01	New	0	±0
Proverist Party (PPr)	373	0.00	−0.01	0	±0
Revolutionary Workers' Party (POR)	0	0.00	−0.04	0	±0
Clean Hands Project (PML)	0	0.00	New	0	±0
Blank ballots	75,757	2.29	+0.46		
Total	9,489,735			4	±0
Valid votes	3,308,590	98.77	+1.12		
Invalid votes	41,103	1.23	−1.12		
Votes cast / turnout	3,349,693	79.76	+0.32		
Abstentions	850,106	20.24	−0.32		
Registered voters	4,199,799				
Sources
Footnotes: ^{1} Republican Coalition results are compared to Coalition for a New Socialist Party totals in the 1993 election.

=== 1993 ===
Summary of the 6 June 1993 Senate of Spain election results in Madrid
Parties and alliances	Popular vote			Seats	
Parties and alliances	Votes	%	±pp	Total	+/−
People's Party (PP)	3,909,087	44.07	+8.18	3	±0
Spanish Socialist Workers' Party (PSOE)	3,174,302	35.78	+0.77	1	±0
United Left (IU)	1,160,693	13.08	−0.35	0	±0
Democratic and Social Centre (CDS)	269,634	3.04	−6.81	0	±0
The Greens (Verdes)^{1}	117,981	1.33	+0.73	0	±0
Ruiz-Mateos Group–European Democratic Alliance (ARM–ADE)	43,095	0.49	−0.07	0	±0
The Ecologists (LE)	26,687	0.30	−0.98	0	±0
United Extremadura (EU)	14,326	0.16	New	0	±0
Leonese People's Union (UPL)	13,000	0.15	New	0	±0
Madrilenian Independent Regional Party (PRIM)^{2}	10,713	0.12	−0.20	0	±0
Green Social Unity (USV)	9,802	0.11	New	0	±0
Spanish Vertex Ecological Development Revindication (VERDE)	9,071	0.10	−0.16	0	±0
Gray Panthers of Spain (ACI)	8,554	0.10	New	0	±0
Spanish Phalanx of the CNSO (FE–JONS)	4,361	0.05	−0.13	0	±0
Spanish Democratic Republican Action (ARDE)	4,248	0.05	−0.02	0	±0
Federal Socialist Party (PSF)	4,168	0.05	New	0	±0
Centrist Unity–Democratic Spanish Party (PED)	4,047	0.05	+0.03	0	±0
Commoners' Land–Castilian Nationalist Party (TC–PNC)	3,902	0.04	New	0	±0
Independent Spanish Phalanx (FEI)	3,397	0.04	+0.02	0	±0
Revolutionary Workers' Party (POR)	3,226	0.04	+0.01	0	±0
Humanist Party (PH)	2,977	0.03	−0.15	0	±0
Natural Law Party (PLN)	2,827	0.03	New	0	±0
Castilianist Union (UC)	2,801	0.03	New	0	±0
Spanish Action (AE)	2,595	0.03	New	0	±0
Spanish Catholic Movement (MCE)	1,891	0.02	New	0	±0
Natural Culture (CN)	1,557	0.02	−0.07	0	±0
Regionalist Party of the Leonese Country (PREPAL)	1,227	0.01	New	0	±0
Blue Party of Progressive Rightwing (PADP)	1,086	0.01	New	0	±0
Social Democratic Spanish Christian Monarchy (MCES)	1,009	0.01	New	0	±0
Coalition for a New Socialist Party (CNPS)^{3}	932	0.01	−0.04	0	±0
Valencian Union (UV)	879	0.01	New	0	±0
Proverist Party (PPr)	467	0.01	−0.02	0	±0
Communist Unification of Spain (UCE)	0	0.00	New	0	±0
Blank ballots	56,316	1.83	+0.23		
Total	8,870,858			4	±0
Valid votes	3,084,890	97.65	−0.16		
Invalid votes	74,291	2.35	+0.16		
Votes cast / turnout	3,159,181	79.44	+4.37		
Abstentions	817,881	20.56	−4.37		
Registered voters	3,977,062				
Sources
Footnotes: ^{1} The Greens results are compared to The Greens–Green List totals in the 1989 election.; ^{2} Madrilenian Independent Regional Party results are compared to Regional Party of Madrid totals in the 1989 election.; ^{3} Coalition for a New Socialist Party results are compared to Alliance for the Republic totals in the 1989 election.

=== 1989 ===
Summary of the 29 October 1989 Senate of Spain election results in Madrid
Parties and alliances	Popular vote			Seats	
Parties and alliances	Votes	%	±pp	Total	+/−
People's Party (PP)^{1}	2,711,232	35.89	+3.61	3	+2
Spanish Socialist Workers' Party (PSOE)	2,645,001	35.01	−5.12	1	−2
United Left (IU)	1,014,834	13.43	+7.20	0	±0
Democratic and Social Centre (CDS)	743,820	9.85	−2.98	0	±0
The Ecologist Greens (LVE)	96,879	1.28	New	0	±0
Workers' Party of Spain–Communist Unity (PTE–UC)^{2}	60,357	0.80	−1.36	0	±0
The Greens–Green List (LV–LV)	45,185	0.60	−0.66	0	±0
Ruiz-Mateos Group (Ruiz-Mateos)	42,641	0.56	New	0	±0
Regional Party of Madrid (PAM)	23,998	0.32	New	0	±0
Workers' Socialist Party (PST)	22,439	0.30	−0.61	0	±0
Spanish Vertex Ecological Development Revindication (VERDE)	19,610	0.26	−0.60	0	±0
Group of Madrid Radicals (GRM)	13,576	0.18	New	0	±0
Spanish Phalanx of the CNSO (FE–JONS)	13,378	0.18	−0.45	0	±0
Humanist Party (PH)	13,346	0.18	New	0	±0
Natural Culture (CN)	6,633	0.09	−0.09	0	±0
Spanish Catholic Movement (MCE)	5,036	0.07	New	0	±0
Spanish Democratic Republican Action (ARDE)	5,016	0.07	New	0	±0
Communists in the Senate Coalition (CS)	4,871	0.06	New	0	±0
Asturianist Party (PAS)	4,171	0.06	New	0	±0
Alliance for the Republic (AxR)^{3}	4,036	0.05	±0.00	0	±0
Nationalist Party of Castile and León (PANCAL)	3,609	0.05	New	0	±0
Independent Citizen Group (ACI)	2,846	0.04	New	0	±0
Revolutionary Workers' Party of Spain (PORE)	2,231	0.03	−0.10	0	±0
Proverist Party (PPr)	2,053	0.03	New	0	±0
Centrist Unity–Democratic Spanish Party (PED)	1,711	0.02	New	0	±0
Liberal and Social Democratic Coalition (CSD y L)	1,498	0.02	New	0	±0
Independent Spanish Phalanx (FEI)	1,202	0.02	New	0	±0
Blank ballots	43,538	1.60	0.63		
Total	7,554,747			4	±0
Valid votes	2,727,165	97.81	−0.47		
Invalid votes	60,938	2.19	+0.47		
Votes cast / turnout	2,788,103	75.07	+1.92		
Abstentions	925,838	24.93	−1.92		
Registered voters	3,713,941				
Sources
Footnotes: ^{1} People's Party results are compared to People's Coalition totals in the 1986 election.; ^{2} Workers' Party of Spain–Communist Unity results are compared to Communists' Unity Board totals in the 1986 election.; ^{3} Alliance for the Republic results are compared to Internationalist Socialist Workers' Party totals in the 1986 election.

=== 1986 ===
Summary of the 22 June 1986 Senate of Spain election results in Madrid
Parties and alliances	Popular vote			Seats	
Parties and alliances	Votes	%	±pp	Total	+/−
Spanish Socialist Workers' Party (PSOE)	2,892,596	40.13	−9.83	3	±0
People's Coalition (AP–PDP–PL)^{1}	2,326,802	32.28	+1.60	1	±0
Democratic and Social Centre (CDS)	924,556	12.83	+8.29	0	±0
United Left (IU)^{2}	449,054	6.23	+0.70	0	±0
Communists' Unity Board (MUC)	155,822	2.16	New	0	±0
Democratic Reformist Party (PRD)	105,045	1.46	New	0	±0
The Greens (LV)	91,107	1.26	New	0	±0
Workers' Socialist Party (PST)	65,821	0.91	−0.18	0	±0
Spanish Vertex Ecological Development Revindication (VERDE)	62,126	0.86	New	0	±0
Spanish Phalanx of the CNSO (FE–JONS)	45,407	0.63	+0.63	0	±0
National Unity Coalition (CUN)	16,776	0.23	New	0	±0
Green Alternative List (LAV)	14,824	0.21	New	0	±0
Natural Culture (CN)	13,036	0.18	New	0	±0
Revolutionary Workers' Party of Spain (PORE)	9,106	0.13	New	0	±0
Communist Unification of Spain (UCE)	4,698	0.07	−0.02	0	±0
Internationalist Socialist Workers' Party (POSI)	3,268	0.05	New	0	±0
Proverist Party (PPr)	2,499	0.03	New	0	±0
Union of the Democratic Centre (UCD)	n/a	n/a	−4.15	0	±0
Blank ballots	24,796	0.97			
Total	7,207,339			4	±0
Valid votes	2,557,877	98.28			
Invalid votes	44,811	1.72			
Votes cast / turnout	2,602,688	73.15			
Abstentions	955,240	26.85			
Registered voters	3,557,928				
Sources
Footnotes: ^{1} People's Coalition results are compared to People's Alliance–People's Democratic Party totals in the 1982 election.; ^{2} United Left results are compared to Communist Party of Spain totals in the 1982 election.

=== 1982 ===
Summary of the 28 October 1982 Senate of Spain election results in Madrid
Parties and alliances	Popular vote			Seats	
Parties and alliances	Votes	%	±pp	Total	+/−
Spanish Socialist Workers' Party (PSOE)	3,954,549	49.96	+19.26	3	+1
People's Alliance–People's Democratic Party (AP–PDP)^{1}	2,428,280	30.68	+21.67	1	+1
Communist Party of Spain (PCE)	437,519	5.53	−10.46	0	±0
Democratic and Social Centre (CDS)	359,383	4.54	New	0	±0
Union of the Democratic Centre (UCD)	328,437	4.15	−25.89	0	−2
Spanish Vertex Ecological Development Revindication (VERDE)	92,452	1.17	New	0	±0
New Force (FN)^{2}	88,000	1.11	−4.00	0	±0
Workers' Socialist Party (PST)	86,010	1.09	New	0	±0
Spanish Solidarity (SE)	36,778	0.46	New	0	±0
Socialist Party (PS)^{3}	27,611	0.35	−0.42	0	±0
Natural Culture (CN)	21,251	0.27	New	0	±0
Independent National Party (PNI)	14,161	0.18	New	0	±0
Falangist Movement of Spain (MFE)	13,397	0.17	New	0	±0
Independent Spanish Phalanx (FEI)	13,297	0.17	New	0	±0
Communist Left Front (FIC)	7,626	0.10	New	0	±0
Communist Unification of Spain (UCE)	6,943	0.09	New	0	±0
Spanish Phalanx of the CNSO (FE–JONS)	0	0.00	New	0	±0
Blank ballots					
Total	7,915,694			4	±0
Valid votes	2,762,663				
Invalid votes					
Votes cast / turnout					
Abstentions					
Registered voters	3,274,966				
Sources
Footnotes: ^{1} People's Alliance–People's Democratic Party results are compared to Democratic Coalition totals in the 1979 election.; ^{2} New Force results are compared to National Union totals in the 1979 election.; ^{3} Socialist Party results are compared to Spanish Socialist Workers' Party (historical) totals in the 1979 election.

=== 1979 ===
Summary of the 1 March 1979 Senate of Spain election results in Madrid
Parties and alliances	Popular vote			Seats	
Parties and alliances	Votes	%	±pp	Total	+/−
Spanish Socialist Workers' Party (PSOE)^{1}	2,016,740	30.70	−26.44	2	−2
Union of the Democratic Centre (UCD)	1,973,368	30.04	+7.84	2	+2
Communist Party of Spain (PCE)	1,050,383	15.99	New	0	±0
Democratic Coalition (CD)^{2}	591,723	9.01	−2.92	0	±0
National Union (UN)^{3}	335,793	5.11	+3.77	0	±0
Workers' Revolutionary Organization (ORT)^{4}	181,675	2.77	+0.34	0	±0
Party of Labour of Spain (PTE)	114,731	1.75	New	0	±0
Spanish Socialist Workers' Party (historical) (PSOEh)^{5}	50,404	0.77	−1.38	0	±0
Spanish Phalanx of the CNSO (Authentic) (FE–JONS(A))	42,207	0.64	New	0	±0
Republican Left (IR)	36,306	0.55	New	0	±0
Spanish Democratic Republican Action (ARDE)	33,294	0.51	New	0	±0
Liberal Party (PL)	31,644	0.48	New	0	±0
Communist Movement–Organization of Communist Left (MC–OIC)	21,941	0.33	New	0	±0
Revolutionary Communist Youth Federation (FJCR)	20,229	0.31	New	0	±0
Authentic Spanish Phalanx (FEA)	14,328	0.22	New	0	±0
Spanish Phalanx–Falangist Unity (FE–UF)	11,935	0.18	New	0	±0
New National Left (NIN)	7,053	0.11	New	0	±0
Blank ballots	35,446	1.57			
Total	6,569,200			4	±0
Valid votes	2,250,828	96.94			
Invalid votes	71,050	3.06			
Votes cast / turnout	2,321,878	73.07			
Abstentions	855,854	26.93			
Registered voters	3,177,732				
Sources
Footnotes: ^{1} Spanish Socialist Workers' Party results are compared to the combined totals of Senators for Democracy and People's Socialist Party–Socialist Unity in the 1977 election.; ^{2} Democratic Coalition results are compared to People's Alliance totals in the 1977 election.; ^{3} National Union results are compared to National Alliance July 18 totals in the 1977 election.; ^{4} Workers' Revolutionary Organization results are compared to Workers of Madrid totals in the 1977 election.; ^{5} Spanish Socialist Workers' Party (historical) results are compared to Democratic Socialist Alliance totals in the 1977 election.

=== 1977 ===
Summary of the 15 June 1977 Senate of Spain election results in Madrid
Parties and alliances	Popular vote			Seats	
Parties and alliances	Votes	%	±pp	Total	+/−
Senators for Democracy (SpD)	2,819,791	40.95	n/a	3	n/a
Union of the Democratic Centre (UCD)	1,529,058	22.20	n/a	0	n/a
People's Socialist Party–Socialist Unity (PSP–US)	1,114,653	16.19	n/a	1	n/a
People's Alliance (AP)	821,378	11.93	n/a	0	n/a
Workers of Madrid (TM)	167,378	2.43	n/a	0	n/a
Democratic Socialist Alliance (ASDCI)	148,229	2.15	n/a	0	n/a
National Alliance July 18 (AN18)	92,100	1.34	n/a	0	n/a
Independent Party of Madrid (PIM)	64,546	0.94	n/a	0	n/a
Spanish Social Reform (RSE)	61.460	0.89	n/a	0	n/a
Spanish Ecologist Party (PEE)	41,901	0.61	n/a	0	n/a
Independent (INDEP)	18,966	0.28	n/a	0	n/a
Confederation of Conservative Parties (CPC)	7,093	0.10	n/a	0	n/a
Blank ballots			n/a		
Total	6,886,553			4	n/a
Valid votes			n/a		
Invalid votes			n/a		
Votes cast / turnout			n/a		
Abstentions			n/a		
Registered voters	2,744,152				

== Bibliography ==
- Ley 1/1977, de 4 de enero, para la Reforma Política (Fundamental Law 1/1977). Official State Gazette (in Spanish). 4 January 1977. BOE-A-1977-165.
- Real Decreto-ley 20/1977, de 18 de marzo, sobre Normas Electorales (Royal Decree-Law 20/1977). Official State Gazette (in Spanish). 18 March 1977. BOE-A-1977-7445.
- Constitución Española (Constitution). Official State Gazette (in Spanish). 27 December 1978. BOE-A-1978-31229.
- Ley Orgánica 5/1985, de 19 de junio, del Régimen Electoral General (Organic Law 5/1985). Official State Gazette (in Spanish). 19 June 1985. BOE-A-1985-11672.
- Carreras de Odriozola, Albert; Tafunell Sambola, Xavier (2005) [1989]. Estadísticas históricas de España, siglos XIX-XX (PDF) (in Spanish). Vol. 1 (II ed.). Bilbao: Fundación BBVA. pp. 1072–1097. ISBN 84-96515-00-1. Archived from the original (PDF) on 24 September 2015.
