= Democratic Senate =

Democratic Senate Senado Democrático
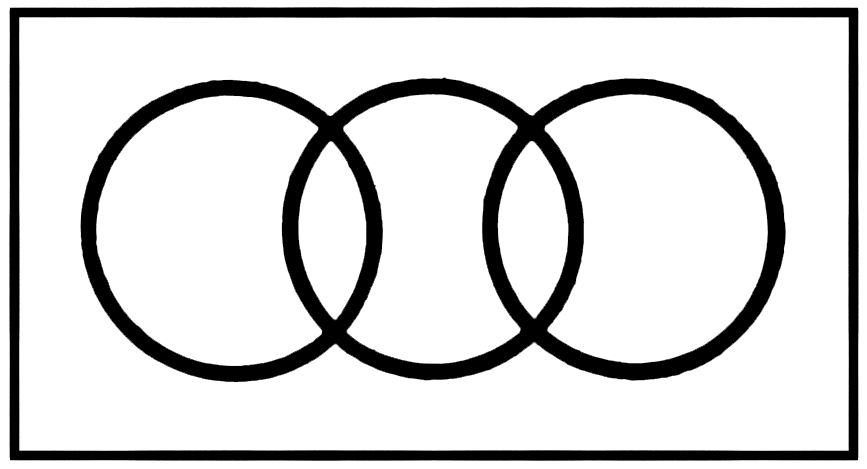
- Founded: 1977
- Dissolved: 1977
- Political position: Centre to centre-left
- Members: See list of members

Democratic Senate (Spanish: Senado Democrático) or Senators for Democracy (Spanish: Senadores por la Democracia) was an electoral alliance in Spain formed by the Spanish Socialist Workers' Party (PSOE), Democratic Left (ID) and Liberal Alliance (AL) to contest the 1977 Spanish Senate election in a number of constituencies, including Badajoz, Burgos, Granada, Madrid, Málaga, Murcia and Oviedo. In the latter, the Communist Party of Spain (PCE) also participated.

== Composition ==
Party	Note
Spanish Socialist Workers' Party (PSOE)	
Democratic Left (ID)	
Liberal Alliance (AL)	
Communist Party of Spain (PCE)	In Oviedo.
