= Socialist Unity (Spain) =

Defunct political party alliance in Spain

Socialist Unity Unidad Socialista
- Leader: Enrique Tierno Galván
- Founded: 1977
- Dissolved: 1978
- Merger of: People's Socialist Party (PSP); Federation of Socialist Parties (FPS)
- Merged into: Spanish Socialist Workers' Party (majority)
- Ideology: Democratic socialism Federalism
- Political position: Left-wing

Socialist Unity (Spanish: Unidad Socialista, US) was a Spanish party alliance formed to contest the 1977 general election by the People's Socialist Party (PSP) of Enrique Tierno Galván and the Federation of Socialist Parties (FPS).

In the Senate, this party only contested some of the constituencies, as the PSP participated in other left-wing coalitions along the Spanish Socialist Workers' Party (PSOE).

The elections' results were considered poor, as Unidad Socialista only had six deputies elected. Of those, five were from the PSP (three from Madrid, including Tierno Galván, and the rest from Cádiz and Valencia each one) and one of the Socialist Party of Aragon (PSAr), from Zaragoza. Two PSP senators were also elected (from Madrid and Alicante).

Given the small number of deputies, the six Unidad Socialista representatives in Congress were placed in the Mixed Group. In the Senate, the two senators took part of a group of independent progressives and socialists. After the PSP and most of the parties within the FPS merged with PSOE throughout 1978, the majority of US deputies and senators were absorbed into PSOE's parliamentary groups in the Congress and Senate.

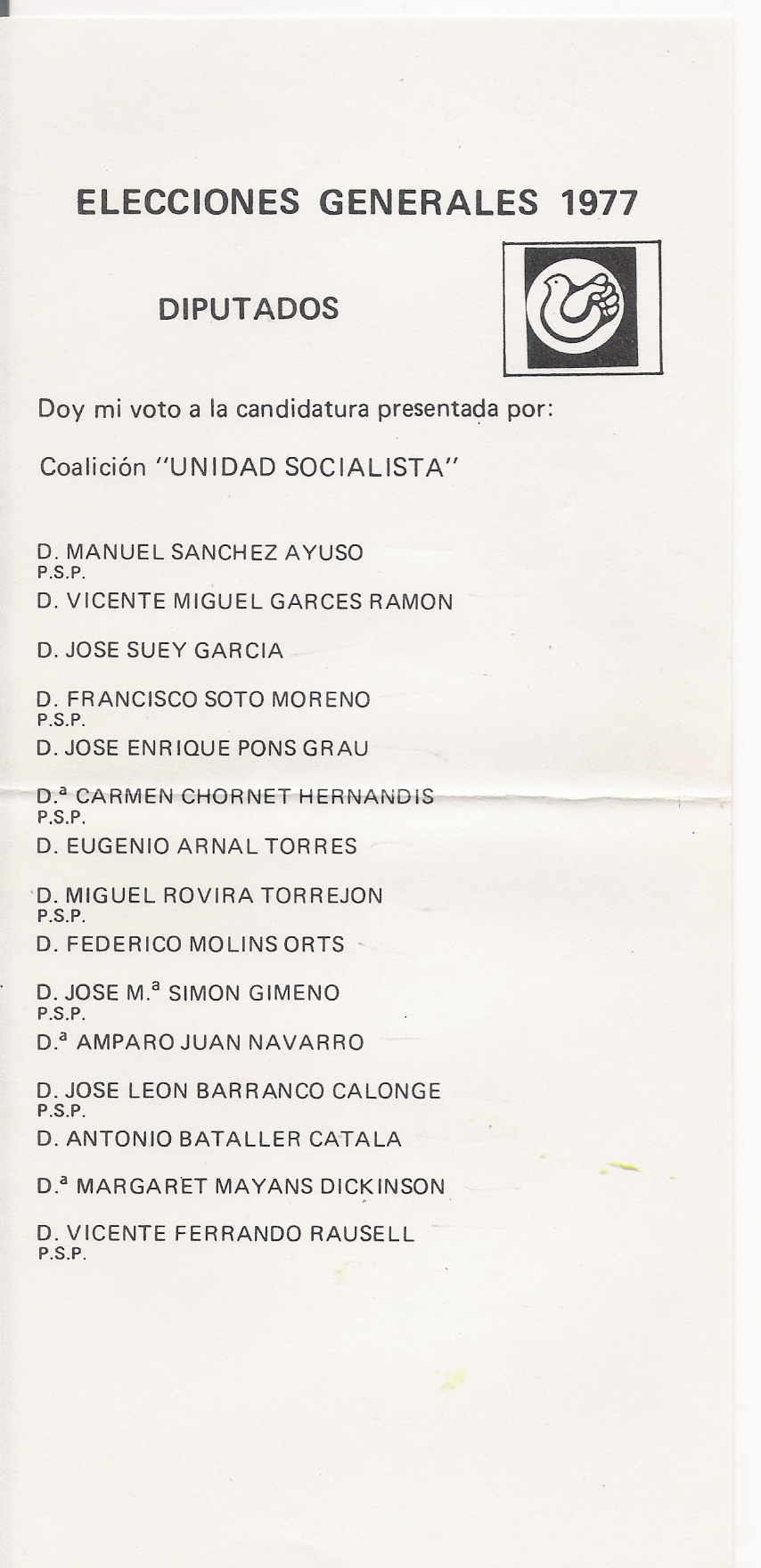
Unidad Socialista ballot in Valencia constituency for Congress.

== Member parties ==
- People's Socialist Party (PSP)
- Federation of Socialist Parties (FPS)
  - Socialist Party of Andalusia (PSA)
  - Socialist Party of Aragon (PSAr)
  - Autonomist Socialist Party of Canaries (PSAC)
  - Socialist Party of the Murcian Region (PSRM)
  - Socialist Party of the Islands (PSI)
  - Socialist Movement of Menorca (MSM)
  - Socialist Party of the Valencian Country (PSPV)

== Election results ==
Cortes Generales
Election	Catalonia						
Election	Congress					Senate	
Election	Votes	%	#	Seats	+/–	Seats	+/–
1977	816,582	4.46	5th	6 / 350	—	4 / 208	—
