= For a Fairer World =

Spanish political party

For a Fairer World Por un Mundo más Justo
- Secretary-General: Jorge Serrano Paradinas
- Founded: 8 January 2004
- Headquarters: C/ Hermosilla, 20, esc. B, 6º, I, Madrid
- Ideology: Internationalism; Pro-Europeanism; Environmentalism; Welfare state
- Political position: Centre-left to left-wing
- National affiliation: European Spring (2014–2019)
- Regional affiliation: Ahora Madrid (2015–2019)

Website
- www.porunmundomasjusto.es

For a Fairer World (Spanish: Por un Mundo más Justo, M+J or PUM+J) is a Spanish political party, created in 2004, whose main objectives are, according to its statutes, the eradication of poverty and the fight against inequality in the world. It promotes the fulfillment of the Sustainable Development Goals, an increase in the quantity and quality of Official Development Assistance (ODA), the closure of the Immigration Detention Centers (CIEs) and fair rules on fiscal and commercial matters nationally and internationally. It is registered in the Registry of Political Parties of the Ministry of the Interior of Spain since January 8, 2004.

== History ==
The party was founded in 2004. Since then, For a Fairer World has participated in general, regional, communal and European elections.

In 2017, For a Fairer World started the campaign SickOfWaiting to expose the infringement of the commitments concerning the relocation of refugees by most of the European governments. The campaign was supported by almost 20.000 people from over a hundred countries.

Since 2019, the party uploads its accounting up-to-the-minute, including bills and supporting documents.

== Ideology ==
The main target of For a Fairer World is, according to the official media of the party, the first article of the Universal Declaration of Human Rights: "All human beings are born free and equal in dignity and rights. They are endowed with reason and conscience and should act towards one another in a spirit of brotherhood." The ideology of the party is based in three pillars: the eradication of extreme poverty and environmental degradation, the non-discrimination towards people from different nationalities and the pursuit of global agreements between the governments of foreign countries.

== Electoral results ==
For a Fairer World has participated in every general election since 2008, with the exception of the 2016 election. In the April 2019 election, the party's candidate to be Prime Minister was Augustine Ndour, the first African person ever to be candidate to be Spanish Prime Minister. In this election, For a Fairer World obtained 21.711 votes.

For a Fairer World has also been present in several European, regional and communal elections.
