= Zipper system =

Electoral lists used for gender parity

The zipper system, also known as "vertical parity" or the "zebra system", is an electoral mechanism intended to enforce gender parity in countries using party-list proportional representation with closed lists. It requires that parties alternate between candidates of either gender on their candidate lists, meaning that 50% of the candidates on the list are women and 50% are men. The zipper system is applied to election laws with the goal of establishing gender parity.

More modern variants on the zipper system, based on the fair share sequence, biproportional apportionment, and other rules can enforce gender quotas much more precisely, while introducing less distortion into party lists.

== Process ==
The zipper system requires parties to create a candidate list in which the gender of the candidates alternates between women and men so that when seats are allocated, the gender of the elected members alternates for each additional seat a party wins.

Vertical parity can also be combined with horizontal parity, which works towards the same goal. Horizontal parity requires that each party also fields an equal number of candidate lists with female and male candidates at the top of the list across each constituency that the party contests. However, this does not necessarily lead to parity as one gender may be placed first in constituencies where their party is unlikely to win any seats.

Some countries use gender quotas on party lists in an attempt to promote gender parity, but with no rank order rule this can be purely symbolic, as women may all be placed near the bottom of the party list and be less likely to be elected.

== Use ==
Some countries mandate the zipper system in their electoral laws. Argentina, Bolivia, Costa Rica, Ecuador, France, Kenya, Lesotho, Libya, Mongolia, Nicaragua, Senegal, South Korea, Tunisia, and Zimbabwe all implement the zipper system in at least one elected body. Of these countries, many do not use the zipper system evenly across legislative bodies, or have additional requirements. In France only bodies elected by proportional systems use the zipper system. Zimbabwe uses the zipper system in Senate elections and only requires 60 out of the 80 seats apply the zipper system. In addition to vertical parity, Costa Rica uses a horizontal parity system, requiring parties to alternate between men and women at the top of their lists in different provinces. Mauritania requires constituencies with more than three seats to use the zipper system. Zipper systems were also introduced in Italy in 1993, but were overturned by the constitutional court in 1995.

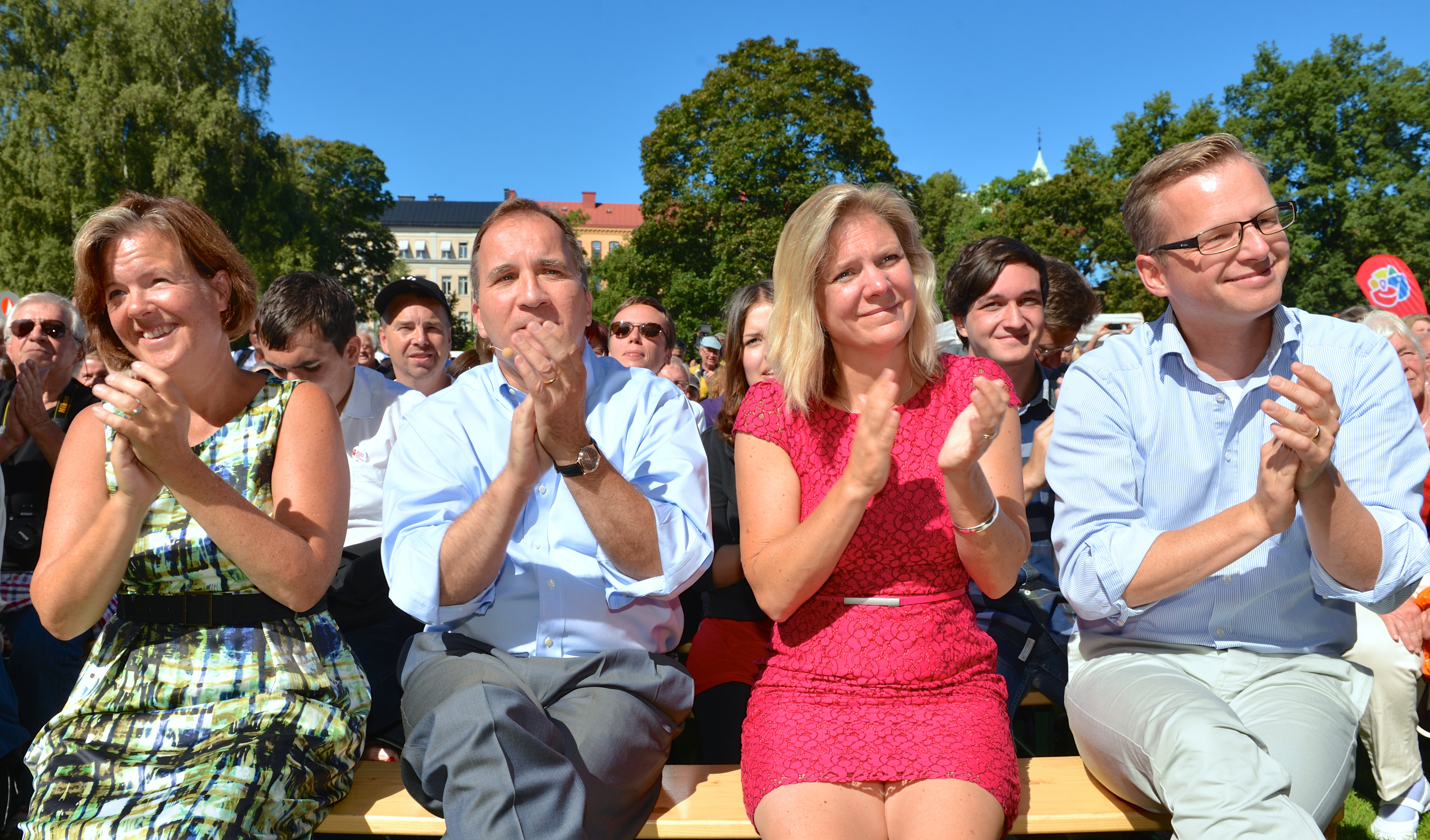
The Swedish Social Democratic Party in Vasaparken in 2013

In countries without a legal requirement, some parties choose to implement the zipper system on their own lists, such as the Swedish Social Democratic Party (SAP). The SAP's introduction of the zipper system in 1993 led to 48% of its candidates in the 1994 general elections being women, and contributed to a record number of female MPs being elected to the Riksdag. Elsewhere, until 2007, local left-wing parties in some provinces of Spain, including Andalusia, Castile-La Mancha, and the Balearic Islands, voluntarily implemented zipped candidate lists after the Popular Party obstructed implementing a zipper system in local election laws for the regions. With the passage of the Equality Law under the Spanish Socialist Worker's Party, local zipper laws took effect in 2007.

== Analysis ==
Although the zipper system rank-order rule requires a 50–50 split between women and men on party lists, it does not always translate to equality of representation in legislatures. While parties are required to alternate between men and women, they often put a man in the first position on the list. If parties win odd numbers of seats in a given election and the party list begins with a man, the number of men elected will be equal to the number of women elected plus one. This gender imbalance is unavoidable where there are odd numbers of seats. If this is a common occurrence across different constituencies and electoral districts, the gender breakdown of the final electoral body will often still be skewed.

Some studies have argued both genders tend to be evenly-placed within party lists, making the zipper system unnecessary, but research on this topic is mixed.
