= Animalist Party with the Environment =

Spanish political party

Animalist Party with the Environment Partido Animalista Con el Medio Ambiente
- President: Javier Luna Sánchez
- Founded: 24 February 2003
- Headquarters: Madrid
- Ideology: Animal welfare Animal rights Social justice
- Political position: Centre-left
- European political alliance: Animal Politics EU
- Colours: Green
- Congress of Deputies: 0 / 350
- Senate: 0 / 266
- European Parliament (Spanish seats): 0 / 61
- Local Government: 0 / 67,611

Website
- www.pacma.es

The Animalist Party With the Environment (Spanish: Partido Animalista Con el Medio Ambiente; PACMA), formerly called Animalist Party Against the Mistreatment of Animals (Spanish: Partido Animalista Contra el Maltrato Animal), is a Spanish political party founded in Bilbao on 24 February 2003. It is focused on animal rights and animal welfare, as a part of the requirement of respect for the right to life. Although its headquarters were initially in Barcelona, it is now established in Madrid.

During the Spanish elections in December 2015, PACMA received 1,034,617 votes for the Senate and 219,000 for the Congress, but did not have any representatives elected due to particularities of the Spanish Electoral Law. By number of votes, PACMA widely overcame other parties that won seats in the Congress and Senate. In order to achieve a law in which every vote is worth the same, PACMA is now campaigning for electoral reform.

== Electoral performance ==
=== Cortes Generales ===
Cortes Generales
Election	Congress					Senate		Leader	Status
Election	Vote	%	Score	Seats	+/–	Seats	+/–	Leader	Status
2008	44,795	0.2	15th	0 / 350	0	0 / 208	0	Ángel Esteban	No seats
2011	102,144	0.4	13th	0 / 350	0	0 / 208	0	Antonio Ignacio Valle	No seats
2015	220,369	0.9	9th	0 / 350	0	0 / 208	0	Silvia Barquero	No seats
2016	286,702	1.2	8th	0 / 350	0	0 / 208	0	Silvia Barquero	No seats
2019 (Apr)	326,045	1.3	9th	0 / 350	0	0 / 208	0	Laura Duarte	No seats
2019 (Nov)	226,376	0.9	12th	0 / 350	0	0 / 208	0	Laura Duarte	No seats
2023	165,768	0.67	12th	0 / 350	0	0 / 208	0	Javier Luna	No seats

=== European Parliament ===
European Parliament
Election	Vote	%	Score	Seats	+/–	EP Group
2009	41,913	0.3	9th	0 / 54	0	–
2014	177,499	1.1	12th	0 / 54	0	–
2019	294,657	1.3	10th	0 / 59	0	–
2024	134,425	0.77	10th	0 / 61	0	–

== See also ==
- Animal Politics EU
- Anti-bullfighting city
- List of animal advocacy parties
