= León (Congress of Deputies constituency) =

Electoral constituency in Spain

Coordinates: 42°40′N 6°00′W

- Congress of Deputies; Electoral constituency
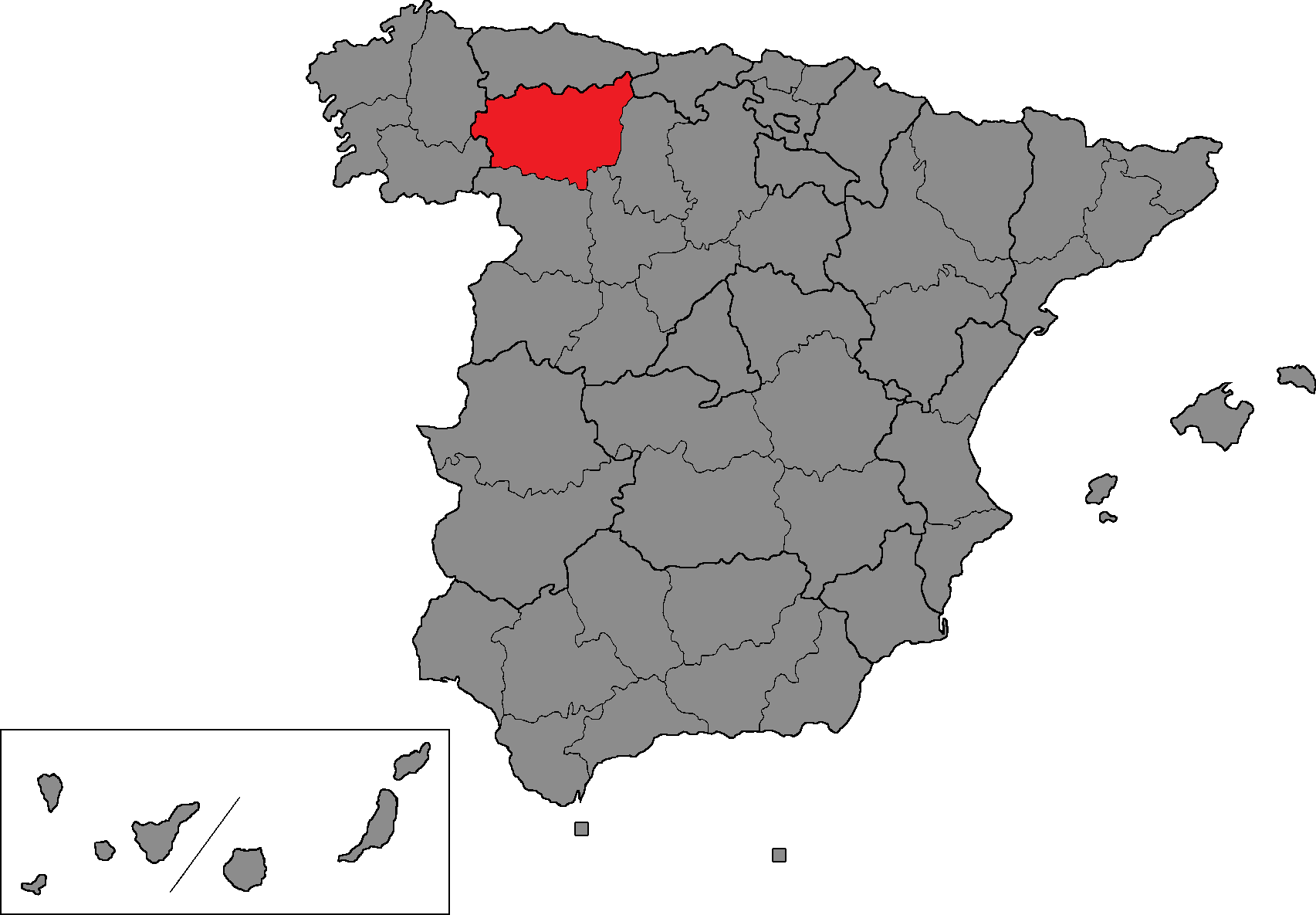
- Location of León within Spain
- Province: León
- Autonomous community: Castile and León
- Population: ▼446,445 (2024)
- Electorate: ▼422,917 (2023)
- Major settlements: León, Ponferrada

Current constituency
- Created: 1977
- Seats: 6 (1977–1986); 5 (1986–2016); 4 (2016–present)
- Members: PP (2); PSOE (2)

León is one of the 52 constituencies represented in the Congress of Deputies, the lower chamber of the Spanish parliament, the Cortes Generales. The constituency (whose boundaries correspond to those of the homonymous province) currently elects four deputies. The electoral system uses the D'Hondt method and closed-list proportional voting, with a minimum threshold of three percent.

== Electoral system ==
The constituency was created as per the Political Reform Law and was first contested in the 1977 general election. The Law provided for the provinces of Spain to be established as multi-member districts in the Congress of Deputies, with this regulation being maintained under the Spanish Constitution of 1978. Additionally, the Constitution requires for any modification of the provincial limits to be approved under an organic law, needing an absolute majority in the Cortes Generales.

Voting is based on universal suffrage, comprising all Spanish nationals over 18 years of age with full political rights, provided that they have not been deprived of the right to vote by a final sentence. The only exception was in 1977, when this was limited to nationals over 21 years of age and in full enjoyment of their political and civil rights. Amendments in 2011 required non-resident citizens to apply for voting, a system known as "begged" voting (Spanish: Voto rogado). which was abolished in 2022. Further, amendments in 2018 granted the right to vote to those legally incapacitated. The Congress of Deputies has a minimum of 300 and a maximum of 400 seats, with electoral provisions fixing its size at 350. Of these, 348 are elected in 50 multi-member constituencies corresponding to the provinces of Spain—each of which is assigned an initial minimum of two seats and the remaining 248 distributed in proportion to population—using the D'Hondt method and closed-list proportional voting, with a three percent-threshold of valid votes (including blank ballots) in each constituency. The remaining two seats are allocated to Ceuta and Melilla as single-member districts elected by plurality voting. The use of this electoral method may result in a higher effective threshold depending on district magnitude and vote distribution. The law does not provide for by-elections to fill vacant seats; instead, any vacancies arising after the proclamation of candidates and during the legislative term are filled by the next candidates on the party lists or, when required, by designated substitutes.

The electoral law allows for parties and federations registered in the interior ministry, alliances and groupings of electors to present lists of candidates. Parties and federations intending to form an alliance are required to inform the relevant electoral commission within 10 days of the election call—15 before 1985—whereas groupings of electors need to secure the signature of at least one percent of the electorate in the constituencies for which they seek election—one permille of the electorate, with a compulsory minimum of 500 signatures, until 1985—disallowing electors from signing for more than one list. Also since 2011, parties, federations or alliances that have not obtained a mandate in either chamber of the Cortes at the preceding election are required to secure the signature of at least 0.1 percent of electors in the aforementioned constituencies. Amendments in 2007 required a balanced composition of men and women in the electoral lists, so that candidates of either sex made up at least 40 percent of the total composition; further amendments in 2024 required the use of a zipper system.

== Deputies ==
Deputies 1977–present
Key to parties U.Podemos Podemos PSOE Cs UCD PP CP AP Vox
Legislature	Election	Distribution
Constituent	1977	1 / 4 / 1
1st	1979	2 / 4
2nd	1982	3 / 1 / 2
3rd	1986	3 / 2
4th	1989	3 / 2
5th	1993	2 / 3
6th	1996	2 / 3
7th	2000	2 / 3
8th	2004	3 / 2
9th	2008	3 / 2
10th	2011	2 / 3
11th	2015	1 / 1 / 1 / 2
12th	2016	1 / 1 / 2
13th	2019 (Apr)	2 / 1 / 1
14th	2019 (Nov)	2 / 1 / 1
15th	2023	2 / 2

== General elections ==
=== 2026 ===
Summary of the 29 November 2026 Congress of Deputies election results in León
Parties and alliances	Popular vote			Seats	
Parties and alliances	Votes	%	±pp	Total	+/−
People's Party (PP)					
Spanish Socialist Workers' Party (PSOE)					
Vox (Vox)					
Broad Front (FA)^{1}			n/a		
We Can (Podemos)^{1}			n/a		
Animalist Party with the Environment (PACMA)					
Workers' Front (FO)					
Communist Party of the Workers of Spain (PCTE)					
Regionalist Party of the Leonese Country (PREPAL)					
The Party is Over (SALF)			New		
Forward Proyect (PAlantre)			New		
Blank Seats to Leave Empty Seats (EB)			New		
Blank ballots					
Total				4	±0
Valid votes					
Invalid votes					
Votes cast / turnout					
Abstentions					
Registered voters	425,983				
Sources
Footnotes: ^{1} Within the Unite alliance in the 2023 election.

=== 2023 ===
Summary of the 23 July 2023 Congress of Deputies election results in León
Parties and alliances	Popular vote			Seats	
Parties and alliances	Votes	%	±pp	Total	+/−
People's Party (PP)	101,605	36.92	+8.49	2	+1
Spanish Socialist Workers' Party (PSOE)	92,578	33.64	+0.18	2	±0
Vox (Vox)	35,451	12.88	–2.68	0	–1
Leonese People's Union (UPL)	22,675	8.24	+4.59	0	±0
Unite (Sumar)^{1}	18,577	6.75	–3.71	0	±0
Animalist Party with the Environment (PACMA)^{2}	895	0.33	–0.24	0	±0
Workers' Front (FO)	541	0.20	New	0	±0
Empty Spain (España Vaciada)	486	0.18	New	0	±0
Communist Party of the Workers of Spain (PCTE)	319	0.12	–0.02	0	±0
Regionalist Party of the Leonese Country (PREPAL)	309	0.11	–0.02	0	±0
For a Fairer World (PUM+J)	155	0.06	–0.06	0	±0
Zero Cuts (Recortes Cero)	72	0.03	–0.04	0	±0
Blank ballots	1,577	0.57	–0.46		
Total	275,240			4	±0
Valid votes	275,240	99.10	+0.24		
Invalid votes	2,486	0.90	–0.24		
Votes cast / turnout	277,726	65.67	+4.17		
Abstentions	145,191	34.33	–4.17		
Registered voters	422,917				
Sources
Footnotes: ^{1} Unite results are compared to United We Can totals in the November 2019 election.; ^{2} Animalist Party with the Environment results are compared to Animalist Party Against Mistreatment of Animals totals in the November 2019 election.

=== November 2019 ===
Summary of the 10 November 2019 Congress of Deputies election results in León
Parties and alliances	Popular vote			Seats	
Parties and alliances	Votes	%	±pp	Total	+/−
Spanish Socialist Workers' Party (PSOE)	87,896	33.46	+0.70	2	±0
People's Party (PP)	74,672	28.43	+4.93	1	±0
Vox (Vox)	40,884	15.56	+4.02	1	+1
United We Can (Podemos–IU)	27,478	10.46	–1.58	0	±0
Citizens–Party of the Citizenry (Cs)	16,731	6.37	–11.10	0	–1
Leonese People's Union (UPL)	9,588	3.65	New	0	±0
Animalist Party Against Mistreatment of Animals (PACMA)	1,505	0.57	–0.23	0	±0
Communist Party of the Workers of Spain (PCTE)	379	0.14	±0.00	0	±0
Regionalist Party of the Leonese Country (PREPAL)	341	0.13	–0.38	0	±0
For a Fairer World (PUM+J)	317	0.12	–0.02	0	±0
Zero Cuts–Green Group–PCAS–TC (Recortes Cero–GV–PCAS–TC)	178	0.07	–0.03	0	±0
Blank ballots	2,710	1.03	+0.04		
Total	262,679			4	±0
Valid votes	262,679	98.86	+0.27		
Invalid votes	3,032	1.14	–0.27		
Votes cast / turnout	265,711	61.50	–6.72		
Abstentions	166,362	38.50	+6.72		
Registered voters	432,073				

=== April 2019 ===
Summary of the 28 April 2019 Congress of Deputies election results in León
Parties and alliances	Popular vote			Seats	
Parties and alliances	Votes	%	±pp	Total	+/−
Spanish Socialist Workers' Party (PSOE)	95,536	32.76	+6.53	2	+1
People's Party (PP)	68,530	23.50	–16.64	1	–1
Citizens–Party of the Citizenry (Cs)	50,945	17.47	+4.70	1	+1
United We Can (Podemos–IU–Equo)	35,103	12.04	–5.58	0	–1
Vox (Vox)	33,653	11.54	+11.32	0	±0
Animalist Party Against Mistreatment of Animals (PACMA)	2,338	0.80	+0.02	0	±0
Regionalist Party of the Leonese Country (PREPAL)	1,476	0.51	+0.41	0	±0
For a Fairer World (PUM+J)	419	0.14	New	0	±0
Communist Party of the Workers of Spain (PCTE)	402	0.14	New	0	±0
Zero Cuts–Green Group–PCAS–TC (Recortes Cero–GV–PCAS–TC)	299	0.10	–0.05	0	±0
Blank ballots	2,899	0.99	+0.14		
Total	291,600			4	±0
Valid votes	291,600	98.59	–0.28		
Invalid votes	4,178	1.41	+0.28		
Votes cast / turnout	295,778	68.22	+3.70		
Abstentions	137,797	31.78	–3.70		
Registered voters	433,575				

=== 2016 ===
Summary of the 26 June 2016 Congress of Deputies election results in León
Parties and alliances	Popular vote			Seats	
Parties and alliances	Votes	%	±pp	Total	+/−
People's Party (PP)	112,723	40.14	+4.55	2	±0
Spanish Socialist Workers' Party (PSOE)	73,681	26.23	+0.88	1	±0
United We Can (Podemos–IU–Equo)^{1}	49,484	17.62	–4.76	1	±0
Citizens–Party of the Citizenry (C's)	35,870	12.77	–0.19	0	–1
Animalist Party Against Mistreatment of Animals (PACMA)	2,184	0.78	+0.15	0	±0
Leonese People's Union (UPL)	2,094	0.75	New	0	±0
Vox (Vox)	620	0.22	–0.03	0	±0
Union, Progress and Democracy (UPyD)	618	0.22	–0.48	0	±0
Zero Cuts–Green Group (Recortes Cero–GV)	430	0.15	–0.01	0	±0
Communist Party of the Peoples of Spain (PCPE)	381	0.14	±0.00	0	±0
Regionalist Party of the Leonese Country (PREPAL)	277	0.10	–0.22	0	±0
Alliance of the Democratic Centre (ALCD)	99	0.04	New	0	±0
Blank ballots	2,397	0.85	–0.16		
Total	280,858			4	–1
Valid votes	280,858	98.87	+0.02		
Invalid votes	3,218	1.13	–0.02		
Votes cast / turnout	284,076	64.52	–2.35		
Abstentions	156,187	35.48	+2.35		
Registered voters	440,263				
Sources
Footnotes: ^{1} United We Can results are compared to the combined totals of We Can and United Left–Popular Unity in Common in the 2015 election.

=== 2015 ===
Summary of the 20 December 2015 Congress of Deputies election results in León
Parties and alliances	Popular vote			Seats	
Parties and alliances	Votes	%	±pp	Total	+/−
People's Party (PP)	104,077	35.59	–16.46	2	–1
Spanish Socialist Workers' Party (PSOE)	74,128	25.35	–8.82	1	–1
We Can (Podemos)	51,441	17.59	New	1	+1
Citizens–Party of the Citizenry (C's)	37,902	12.96	New	1	+1
United Left–Popular Unity in Common (IU–UPeC)	13,997	4.79	–0.53	0	±0
Union, Progress and Democracy (UPyD)	2,047	0.70	–3.96	0	±0
Animalist Party Against Mistreatment of Animals (PACMA)	1,838	0.63	+0.26	0	±0
Grouped Rural Citizens (CRA)	1,032	0.35	New	0	±0
Regionalist Party of the Leonese Country (PREPAL)	922	0.32	–0.10	0	±0
Vox (Vox)	745	0.25	New	0	±0
Communist Party of the Peoples of Spain (PCPE)	534	0.18	+0.01	0	±0
Zero Cuts–Green Group (Recortes Cero–GV)	482	0.16	New	0	±0
National Democracy (DN)	313	0.11	New	0	±0
Blank ballots	2,943	1.01	–0.86		
Total	292,401			5	±0
Valid votes	292,401	98.85	+0.40		
Invalid votes	3,411	1.15	–0.40		
Votes cast / turnout	295,812	66.87	+0.33		
Abstentions	146,563	33.13	–0.33		
Registered voters	442,375				

=== 2011 ===
Summary of the 20 November 2011 Congress of Deputies election results in León
Parties and alliances	Popular vote			Seats	
Parties and alliances	Votes	%	±pp	Total	+/−
People's Party (PP)	152,672	52.05	+8.72	3	+1
Spanish Socialist Workers' Party (PSOE)	100,210	34.17	–15.92	2	–1
United Left of Castile and León: Plural Left (IUCyL)	15,598	5.32	+3.18	0	±0
Union, Progress and Democracy (UPyD)	13,672	4.66	+3.90	0	±0
Equo (Equo)	2,154	0.73	New	0	±0
Regionalist Party of the Leonese Country (PREPAL)	1,221	0.42	+0.36	0	±0
Animalist Party Against Mistreatment of Animals (PACMA)	1,074	0.37	+0.24	0	±0
For a Fairer World (PUM+J)	565	0.19	+0.13	0	±0
Communist Party of the Peoples of Spain (PCPE)	502	0.17	+0.12	0	±0
Communist Unification of Spain (UCE)	152	0.05	New	0	±0
Blank ballots	5,470	1.87	+0.77		
Total	293,290			5	±0
Valid votes	293,290	98.45	–0.97		
Invalid votes	4,616	1.55	+0.97		
Votes cast / turnout	297,906	66.54	–8.13		
Abstentions	149,802	33.46	+8.13		
Registered voters	447,708				

=== 2008 ===
Summary of the 9 March 2008 Congress of Deputies election results in León
Parties and alliances	Popular vote			Seats	
Parties and alliances	Votes	%	±pp	Total	+/−
Spanish Socialist Workers' Party (PSOE)	166,350	50.09	+3.31	3	±0
People's Party (PP)	143,897	43.33	–1.63	2	±0
United Left–Alternative (IU)	7,111	2.14	±0.00	0	±0
Leonese People's Union (UPL)	4,509	1.36	–2.64	0	±0
Union, Progress and Democracy (UPyD)	2,532	0.76	New	0	±0
The Greens of Europe (LVdE)	534	0.16	New	0	±0
The Greens–Green Group (LV–GV)	460	0.14	New	0	±0
Anti-Bullfighting Party Against Mistreatment of Animals (PACMA)	436	0.13	New	0	±0
Citizens–Party of the Citizenry (C's)	401	0.12	New	0	±0
People of El Bierzo (PB–UB)	385	0.12	New	0	±0
Spanish Phalanx of the CNSO (FE de las JONS)	305	0.09	+0.04	0	±0
Social Democratic Party (PSD)	247	0.07	New	0	±0
Regionalist Party of the Leonese Country (PREPAL)	215	0.06	–0.01	0	±0
For a Fairer World (PUM+J)	197	0.06	New	0	±0
Citizens for Blank Votes (CenB)	188	0.06	–0.10	0	±0
National Democracy (DN)	160	0.05	+0.02	0	±0
Communist Party of the Peoples of Spain (PCPE)	153	0.05	New	0	±0
Spanish Front (Frente)	73	0.02	New	0	±0
Humanist Party (PH)	61	0.02	New	0	±0
Spanish Alternative (AES)	57	0.02	New	0	±0
Spain 2000 (E–2000)	47	0.01	New	0	±0
Centrist Party (PCTR)	43	0.01	New	0	±0
State of Spain Unionist Party (PUEDE)	40	0.01	New	0	±0
National Alliance (AN)	39	0.01	New	0	±0
Blank ballots	3,638	1.10	–0.40		
Total	332,078			5	±0
Valid votes	332,078	99.42	–0.06		
Invalid votes	1,935	0.58	+0.06		
Votes cast / turnout	334,013	74.67	–0.15		
Abstentions	113,293	25.33	+0.15		
Registered voters	447,306				

=== 2004 ===
Summary of the 14 March 2004 Congress of Deputies election results in León
Parties and alliances	Popular vote			Seats	
Parties and alliances	Votes	%	±pp	Total	+/−
Spanish Socialist Workers' Party (PSOE)	156,786	46.78	+14.83	3	+1
People's Party (PP)	150,688	44.96	–3.79	2	–1
Leonese People's Union (UPL)	13,406	4.00	–9.35	0	±0
United Left (IU)	7,160	2.14	–1.48	0	±0
Citizens for Blank Votes (CenB)	527	0.16	New	0	±0
Democratic and Social Centre (CDS)	292	0.09	±0.00	0	±0
Salamanca–Zamora–León–PREPAL (PREPAL)	232	0.07	–0.04	0	±0
Family and Life Party (PFyV)	212	0.06	New	0	±0
Republican Left (IR)	187	0.06	New	0	±0
The Phalanx (FE)	173	0.05	–0.03	0	±0
Spanish Phalanx of the CNSO (FE de las JONS)	158	0.05	New	0	±0
National Democracy (DN)	110	0.03	New	0	±0
Commoners' Land–Castilian Nationalist Party (TC–PNC)	108	0.03	–0.01	0	±0
Republican Social Movement (MSR)	65	0.02	New	0	±0
Blank ballots	5,031	1.50	+0.15		
Total	335,135			5	±0
Valid votes	335,135	99.48	+0.09		
Invalid votes	1,750	0.52	–0.09		
Votes cast / turnout	336,885	74.82	+5.19		
Abstentions	113,394	25.18	–5.19		
Registered voters	450,279				

=== 2000 ===
Summary of the 12 March 2000 Congress of Deputies election results in León
Parties and alliances	Popular vote			Seats	
Parties and alliances	Votes	%	±pp	Total	+/−
People's Party (PP)	152,268	48.75	+0.01	3	±0
Spanish Socialist Workers' Party–Progressives (PSOE–p)	99,804	31.95	–5.92	2	±0
Leonese People's Union (UPL)	41,690	13.35	+9.74	0	±0
United Left (IU)	11,316	3.62	–4.05	0	±0
Party of El Bierzo (PB)	1,191	0.38	+0.08	0	±0
Salamanca–Zamora–León–PREPAL (PREPAL)	330	0.11	–0.01	0	±0
Centrist Union–Democratic and Social Centre (UC–CDS)	293	0.09	±0.00	0	±0
Natural Law Party (PLN)	277	0.09	New	0	±0
The Phalanx (FE)	239	0.08	New	0	±0
Communist Party of the Peoples of Spain (PCPE)	224	0.07	New	0	±0
Humanist Party (PH)	216	0.07	+0.03	0	±0
Spanish Democratic Party (PADE)	151	0.05	New	0	±0
Commoners' Land–Castilian Nationalist Party (TC–PNC)	129	0.04	+0.02	0	±0
Blank ballots	4,206	1.35	+0.28		
Total	312,334			5	±0
Valid votes	312,334	99.39	–0.12		
Invalid votes	1,924	0.61	+0.12		
Votes cast / turnout	314,258	69.63	–7.34		
Abstentions	137,064	30.37	+7.34		
Registered voters	451,322				

=== 1996 ===
Summary of the 3 March 1996 Congress of Deputies election results in León
Parties and alliances	Popular vote			Seats	
Parties and alliances	Votes	%	±pp	Total	+/−
People's Party (PP)	162,850	48.74	+4.56	3	±0
Spanish Socialist Workers' Party (PSOE)	126,532	37.87	–2.48	2	±0
United Left of Castile and León (IUCL)	25,622	7.67	+1.01	0	±0
Leonese People's Union (UPL)	12,049	3.61	–0.05	0	±0
The European Greens (LVE)	1,109	0.33	–0.19	0	±0
Party of El Bierzo (PB)	1,000	0.30	–0.14	0	±0
Salamanca–Zamora–León–PREPAL (PREPAL)	395	0.12	±0.00	0	±0
Centrist Union (UC)	313	0.09	–2.29	0	±0
Authentic Spanish Phalanx (FEA)	208	0.06	New	0	±0
Humanist Party (PH)	134	0.04	+0.01	0	±0
Workers' Revolutionary Party (PRT)	121	0.04	New	0	±0
Regionalist Unity of Castile and León (URCL)	115	0.03	New	0	±0
Commoners' Land–Castilian Nationalist Party (TC–PNC)	61	0.02	–0.02	0	±0
Blank ballots	3,586	1.07	±0.00		
Total	334,095			5	±0
Valid votes	334,095	99.51	+0.14		
Invalid votes	1,638	0.49	–0.14		
Votes cast / turnout	335,733	76.97	+1.35		
Abstentions	100,473	23.03	–1.35		
Registered voters	436,206				
Sources
Footnotes: ^{1} Republican Coalition results are compared to Coalition for a New Socialist Party totals in the 1993 election.

=== 1993 ===
Summary of the 6 June 1993 Congress of Deputies election results in León
Parties and alliances	Popular vote			Seats	
Parties and alliances	Votes	%	±pp	Total	+/−
People's Party (PP)	142,574	44.18	+5.78	3	+1
Spanish Socialist Workers' Party (PSOE)	130,241	40.35	+0.47	2	–1
United Left of Castile and León (IU)	21,510	6.66	+0.40	0	±0
Leonese People's Union (UPL)	11,805	3.66	New	0	±0
Democratic and Social Centre (CDS)	7,694	2.38	–7.73	0	±0
The Greens (LV)^{1}	1,682	0.52	–0.31	0	±0
Party of El Bierzo (PB)	1,418	0.44	New	0	±0
The Ecologists (LE)	704	0.22	–0.29	0	±0
Ruiz-Mateos Group–European Democratic Alliance (ARM–ADE)	627	0.19	–0.83	0	±0
Regionalist Party of the Leonese Country (PREPAL)	385	0.12	–0.52	0	±0
Spanish Phalanx of the CNSO (FE–JONS)	220	0.07	–0.06	0	±0
Commoners' Land–Castilian Nationalist Party (TC–PNC)	117	0.04	New	0	±0
Natural Law Party (PLN)	113	0.04	New	0	±0
Coalition for a New Socialist Party (CNPS)^{2}	109	0.03	–0.08	0	±0
Humanist Party (PH)	106	0.03	–0.04	0	±0
Communist Unification of Spain (UCE)	0	0.00	New	0	±0
Blank ballots	3,440	1.07	+0.10		
Total	322,745			5	±0
Valid votes	322,745	99.37	+0.61		
Invalid votes	2,031	0.63	–0.61		
Votes cast / turnout	324,776	75.62	+6.49		
Abstentions	104,690	24.38	–6.49		
Registered voters	429,466				
Sources
Footnotes: ^{1} The Greens results are compared to The Greens–Green List totals in the 1989 election.; ^{2} Coalition for a New Socialist Party results are compared to Alliance for the Republic totals in the 1989 election.

=== 1989 ===
Summary of the 29 October 1989 Congress of Deputies election results in León
Parties and alliances	Popular vote			Seats	
Parties and alliances	Votes	%	±pp	Total	+/−
Spanish Socialist Workers' Party (PSOE)	114,046	39.88	–5.32	3	±0
People's Party (PP)^{1}	109,792	38.40	+4.16	2	±0
Democratic and Social Centre (CDS)	28,898	10.11	–2.27	0	±0
United Left (IU)	17,910	6.26	+3.66	0	±0
Ruiz-Mateos Group (Ruiz-Mateos)	2,913	1.02	New	0	±0
The Greens–Green List (LV–LV)	2,385	0.83	New	0	±0
Regionalist Party of the Leonese Country (PREPAL)	1,825	0.64	+0.16	0	±0
Workers' Socialist Party (PST)	1,819	0.64	+0.14	0	±0
The Ecologist Greens (LVE)	1,454	0.51	New	0	±0
Workers' Party of Spain–Communist Unity (PTE–UC)^{2}	713	0.25	–0.57	0	±0
Communist Party of the Peoples of Spain (PCPE)	514	0.18	New	0	±0
Spanish Phalanx of the CNSO (FE–JONS)	372	0.13	–0.13	0	±0
Alliance for the Republic (AxR)	325	0.11	New	0	±0
Humanist Party (PH)	191	0.07	New	0	±0
Blank ballots	2,786	0.97	+0.14		
Total	285,943			5	±0
Valid votes	285,943	98.76	+0.57		
Invalid votes	3,598	1.24	–0.57		
Votes cast / turnout	289,541	69.13	+0.64		
Abstentions	129,310	30.87	–0.64		
Registered voters	418,851				
Sources
Footnotes: ^{1} People's Party results are compared to People's Coalition totals in the 1986 election.; ^{2} Workers' Party of Spain–Communist Unity results are compared to Communists' Unity Board totals in the 1986 election.

=== 1986 ===
Summary of the 22 June 1986 Congress of Deputies election results in León
Parties and alliances	Popular vote			Seats	
Parties and alliances	Votes	%	±pp	Total	+/−
Spanish Socialist Workers' Party (PSOE)	130,432	45.20	+0.46	3	±0
People's Coalition (AP–PDP–PL)^{1}	98,802	34.24	+2.50	2	±0
Democratic and Social Centre (CDS)	35,709	12.38	+9.68	0	±0
United Left (IU)^{2}	7,510	2.60	+0.63	0	±0
Democratic Reformist Party (PRD)	3,417	1.18	New	0	±0
Communists' Unity Board (MUC)	2,373	0.82	New	0	±0
Leonese Convergence (CL)	1,922	0.67	New	0	±0
Workers' Socialist Party (PST)	1,441	0.50	+0.07	0	±0
Regionalist Party of the Leonese Country (PREPAL)	1,371	0.48	–0.16	0	±0
Communist Unification of Spain (UCE)	1,083	0.38	+0.19	0	±0
Spanish Phalanx of the CNSO (FE–JONS)	753	0.26	New	0	±0
Republican Popular Unity (UPR)^{3}	596	0.21	+0.06	0	±0
National Unity Coalition (CUN)	378	0.13	New	0	±0
Party of the Communists of Catalonia (PCC)	357	0.12	New	0	±0
Union of the Democratic Centre (UCD)	n/a	n/a	–15.51	0	–1
Blank ballots	2,407	0.83	+0.19		
Total	288,551			5	–1
Valid votes	288,551	98.19	+0.96		
Invalid votes	5,305	1.81	–0.96		
Votes cast / turnout	293,856	68.49	–8.55		
Abstentions	135,224	31.51	+8.55		
Registered voters	429,080				
Sources
Footnotes: ^{1} People's Coalition results are compared to People's Alliance–People's Democratic Party totals in the 1982 election.; ^{2} United Left results are compared to Communist Party of Spain totals in the 1982 election.; ^{3} Republican Popular Unity results are compared to Communist Party of Spain (Marxist–Leninist) totals in the 1982 election.

=== 1982 ===
Summary of the 28 October 1982 Congress of Deputies election results in León
Parties and alliances	Popular vote			Seats	
Parties and alliances	Votes	%	±pp	Total	+/−
Spanish Socialist Workers' Party (PSOE)	133,206	44.74	+16.96	3	+1
People's Alliance–People's Democratic Party (AP–PDP)^{1}	94,506	31.74	+20.36	2	+2
Union of the Democratic Centre (UCD)	46,170	15.51	–34.63	1	–3
Democratic and Social Centre (CDS)	8,052	2.70	New	0	±0
Communist Party of Spain (PCE)	5,856	1.97	–3.92	0	±0
Regionalist Party of the Leonese Country (PREPAL)	1,912	0.64	New	0	±0
Party of El Bierzo (PB)	1,454	0.49	New	0	±0
Workers' Socialist Party (PST)	1,276	0.43	New	0	±0
New Force (FN)^{2}	1,106	0.37	–0.81	0	±0
Communist Unity Candidacy (CUC)^{3}	616	0.21	–0.34	0	±0
Communist Unification of Spain (UCE)	565	0.19	New	0	±0
Communist Party of Spain (Marxist–Leninist) (PCE (m–l))	445	0.15	New	0	±0
Communist League–Internationalist Socialist Workers' Coalition (LC (COSI))	313	0.11	New	0	±0
Falangist Movement of Spain (MFE)	295	0.10	New	0	±0
Communist Movement of Castile and León (MC–CL)	36	0.01	–0.23	0	±0
Revolutionary Communist League (LCR)	26	0.01	–0.19	0	±0
Blank ballots	1,899	0.64	+0.22		
Total	297,733			6	±0
Valid votes	297,733	97.23	–1.39		
Invalid votes	8,484	2.77	+1.39		
Votes cast / turnout	306,217	77.04	+13.38		
Abstentions	91,253	22.96	–13.38		
Registered voters	397,470				
Sources
Footnotes: ^{1} People's Alliance–People's Democratic Party results are compared to Democratic Coalition totals in the 1979 election.; ^{2} New Force results are compared to National Union totals in the 1979 election.; ^{3} Communist Unity Candidacy results are compared to Workers' Communist Party totals in the 1979 election.

=== 1979 ===
Summary of the 1 March 1979 Congress of Deputies election results in León
Parties and alliances	Popular vote			Seats	
Parties and alliances	Votes	%	±pp	Total	+/−
Union of the Democratic Centre (UCD)	129,085	50.14	–0.74	4	±0
Spanish Socialist Workers' Party (PSOE)^{1}	71,533	27.78	+0.40	2	+1
Democratic Coalition (CD)^{2}	29,313	11.38	–0.94	0	–1
Communist Party of Spain (PCE)	15,157	5.89	+1.28	0	±0
National Union (UN)	3,029	1.18	New	0	±0
Workers' Communist Party (PCT)	1,408	0.55	New	0	±0
Party of Labour of Spain (PTE)^{3}	1,405	0.55	–0.45	0	±0
Spanish Ruralist Party (PRE)	1,379	0.54	New	0	±0
Workers' Revolutionary Organization (ORT)	1,262	0.48	New	0	±0
Spanish Phalanx of the CNSO (Authentic) (FE–JONS(A))	1,227	0.48	New	0	±0
Communist Movement–Organization of Communist Left (MC–OIC)	630	0.24	New	0	±0
Revolutionary Communist League (LCR)	515	0.20	New	0	±0
Carlist Party (PC)	335	0.13	New	0	±0
Union for the Freedom of Speech (ULE)	118	0.05	New	0	±0
Blank ballots	1,075	0.42	–0.05		
Total	257,471			6	±0
Valid votes	257,471	98.62	–0.11		
Invalid votes	3,614	1.38	+0.11		
Votes cast / turnout	261,085	63.66	–11.50		
Abstentions	149,057	36.34	+11.50		
Registered voters	410,142				
Sources
Footnotes: ^{1} Spanish Socialist Workers' Party results are compared to the combined totals of Spanish Socialist Workers' Party, People's Socialist Party–Socialist Unity and Centre-Left of Albacete in the 1977 election.; ^{2} Democratic Coalition results are compared to People's Alliance totals in the 1977 election.; ^{3} Party of Labour of Spain results are compared to Democratic Left Front totals in the 1977 election.

=== 1977 ===
Summary of the 15 June 1977 Congress of Deputies election results in León
Parties and alliances	Popular vote			Seats	
Parties and alliances	Votes	%	±pp	Total	+/−
Union of the Democratic Centre (UCD)	137,495	50.88	n/a	4	n/a
Spanish Socialist Workers' Party (PSOE)	64,766	23.97	n/a	1	n/a
People's Alliance (AP)	33,285	12.32	n/a	1	n/a
Communist Party of Spain (PCE)	12,460	4.61	n/a	0	n/a
People's Socialist Party–Socialist Unity (PSP–US)	9,212	3.41	n/a	0	n/a
Democratic Socialist Alliance (ASDCI)	4,645	1.72	n/a	0	n/a
Federation of Christian Democracy (FPD–ID)	4,371	1.62	n/a	0	n/a
Democratic Left Front (FDI)	2,712	1.00	n/a	0	n/a
Blank ballots	1,282	0.47	n/a		
Total	270,228			6	n/a
Valid votes	270,228	98.73	n/a		
Invalid votes	3,466	1.27	n/a		
Votes cast / turnout	273,694	75.16	n/a		
Abstentions	90,433	24.84	n/a		
Registered voters	364,127				

== Bibliography ==
- Ley 1/1977, de 4 de enero, para la Reforma Política (Fundamental Law 1/1977). Official State Gazette (in Spanish). 4 January 1977. BOE-A-1977-165.
- Real Decreto-ley 20/1977, de 18 de marzo, sobre Normas Electorales (Royal Decree-Law 20/1977). Official State Gazette (in Spanish). 18 March 1977. BOE-A-1977-7445.
- Constitución Española (Constitution). Official State Gazette (in Spanish). 27 December 1978. BOE-A-1978-31229.
- Ley Orgánica 5/1985, de 19 de junio, del Régimen Electoral General (Organic Law 5/1985). Official State Gazette (in Spanish). 19 June 1985. BOE-A-1985-11672.
- Carreras de Odriozola, Albert; Tafunell Sambola, Xavier (2005) [1989]. Estadísticas históricas de España, siglos XIX-XX (PDF) (in Spanish). Vol. 1 (II ed.). Bilbao: Fundación BBVA. pp. 1072–1097. ISBN 84-96515-00-1. Archived from the original (PDF) on 24 September 2015.
