= Córdoba (Congress of Deputies constituency) =

Electoral constituency in Spain

Coordinates: 38°00′N 4°50′W

- Congress of Deputies; Electoral constituency
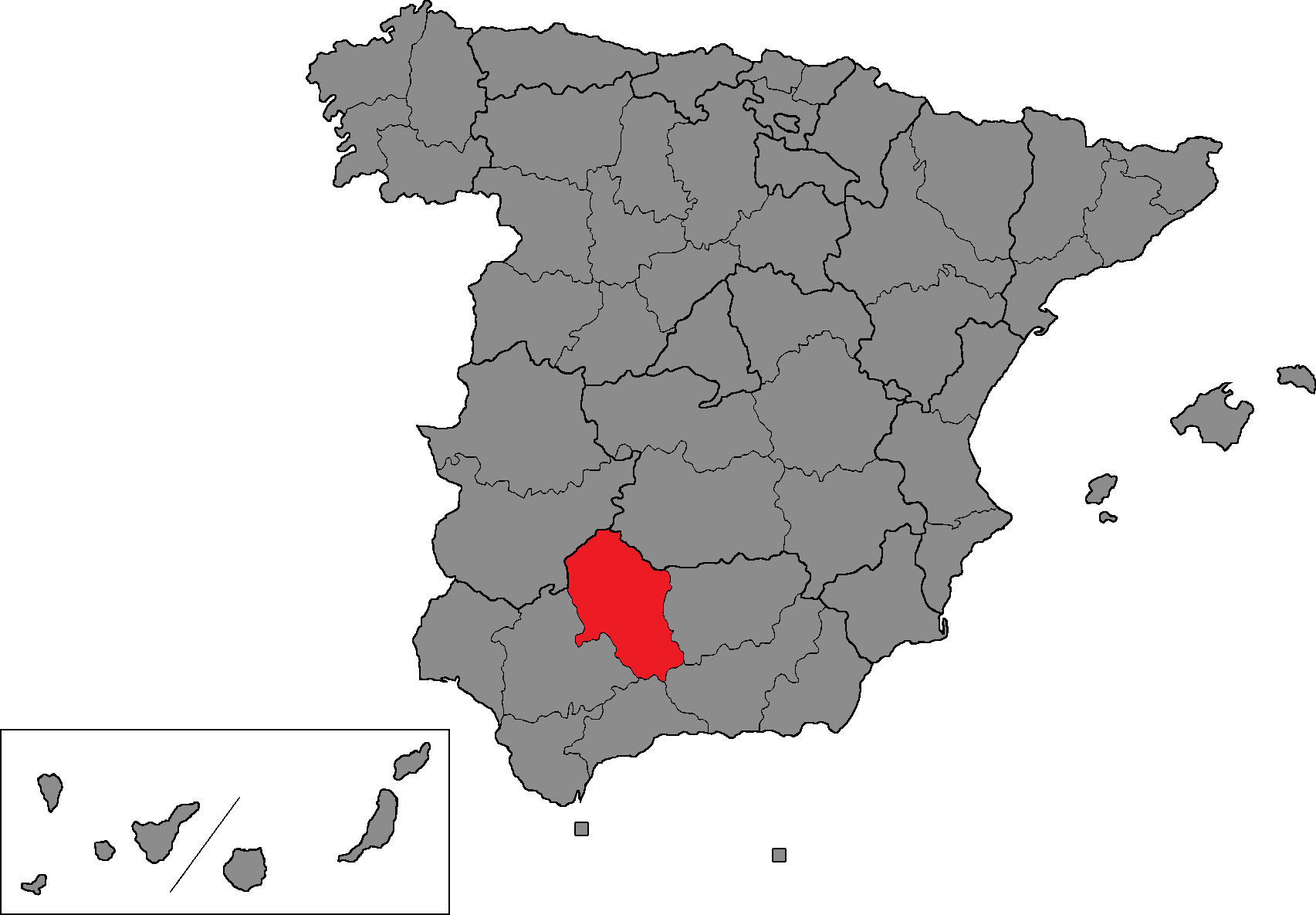
- Location of Córdoba within Spain
- Province: Córdoba
- Autonomous community: Andalusia
- Population: ▼772,152 (2024)
- Electorate: ▼645,288 (2023)
- Major settlements: Córdoba

Current constituency
- Created: 1977
- Seats: 7 (1977–2008); 6 (2008–present)
- Members: PP (2); PSOE (2); Vox (1); Sumar (1)

Córdoba is one of the 52 constituencies represented in the Congress of Deputies, the lower chamber of the Spanish parliament, the Cortes Generales. The constituency (whose boundaries correspond to those of the homonymous province) currently elects six deputies. The electoral system uses the D'Hondt method and closed-list proportional voting, with a minimum threshold of three percent.

== Electoral system ==
The constituency was created as per the Political Reform Law and was first contested in the 1977 general election. The Law provided for the provinces of Spain to be established as multi-member districts in the Congress of Deputies, with this regulation being maintained under the Spanish Constitution of 1978. Additionally, the Constitution requires for any modification of the provincial limits to be approved under an organic law, needing an absolute majority in the Cortes Generales.

Voting is based on universal suffrage, comprising all Spanish nationals over 18 years of age with full political rights, provided that they have not been deprived of the right to vote by a final sentence. The only exception was in 1977, when this was limited to nationals over 21 years of age and in full enjoyment of their political and civil rights. Amendments in 2011 required non-resident citizens to apply for voting, a system known as "begged" voting (Spanish: Voto rogado). which was abolished in 2022. Further, amendments in 2018 granted the right to vote to those legally incapacitated. The Congress of Deputies has a minimum of 300 and a maximum of 400 seats, with electoral provisions fixing its size at 350. Of these, 348 are elected in 50 multi-member constituencies corresponding to the provinces of Spain—each of which is assigned an initial minimum of two seats and the remaining 248 distributed in proportion to population—using the D'Hondt method and closed-list proportional voting, with a three percent-threshold of valid votes (including blank ballots) in each constituency. The remaining two seats are allocated to Ceuta and Melilla as single-member districts elected by plurality voting. The use of this electoral method may result in a higher effective threshold depending on district magnitude and vote distribution. The law does not provide for by-elections to fill vacant seats; instead, any vacancies arising after the proclamation of candidates and during the legislative term are filled by the next candidates on the party lists or, when required, by designated substitutes.

The electoral law allows for parties and federations registered in the interior ministry, alliances and groupings of electors to present lists of candidates. Parties and federations intending to form an alliance are required to inform the relevant electoral commission within 10 days of the election call—15 before 1985—whereas groupings of electors need to secure the signature of at least one percent of the electorate in the constituencies for which they seek election—one permille of the electorate, with a compulsory minimum of 500 signatures, until 1985—disallowing electors from signing for more than one list. Also since 2011, parties, federations or alliances that have not obtained a mandate in either chamber of the Cortes at the preceding election are required to secure the signature of at least 0.1 percent of electors in the aforementioned constituencies. Amendments in 2007 required a balanced composition of men and women in the electoral lists, so that candidates of either sex made up at least 40 percent of the total composition; further amendments in 2024 required the use of a zipper system.

== Deputies ==
Deputies 1977–present
Key to parties PCE IU IULV–CA U.Podemos Podemos Sumar PA PSOE Cs UCD PP CP AP Vox
Legislature	Election	Distribution
Constituent	1977	1 / 3 / 3
1st	1979	1 / 3 / 3
2nd	1982	5 / 2
3rd	1986	1 / 4 / 2
4th	1989	1 / 5 / 1
5th	1993	1 / 4 / 2
6th	1996	1 / 4 / 2
7th	2000	1 / 3 / 3
8th	2004	4 / 3
9th	2008	4 / 2
10th	2011	3 / 3
11th	2015	1 / 2 / 1 / 2
12th	2016	1 / 2 / 1 / 2
13th	2019 (Apr)	1 / 2 / 1 / 1 / 1
14th	2019 (Nov)	1 / 2 / 2 / 1
15th	2023	1 / 2 / 2 / 1

== General elections ==
=== 2026 ===
Summary of the 29 November 2026 Congress of Deputies election results in Córdoba
Parties and alliances	Popular vote			Seats	
Parties and alliances	Votes	%	±pp	Total	+/−
People's Party (PP)					
Spanish Socialist Workers' Party (PSOE)					
Vox (Vox)					
Andalusian Broad Front (FA)^{1}			n/a		
We Can (Podemos)^{1}			n/a		
Animalist Party with the Environment (PACMA)					
Blank Seats to Leave Empty Seats (EB)					
Communist Party of the Workers of Spain (PCTE)					
Workers' Front (FO)					
Forward Andalusia (Adelante Andalucía)			New		
The Party is Over (SALF)			New		
Spanish Phalanx of the CNSO (FE de las JONS)			New		
Blank ballots					
Total				6	±0
Valid votes					
Invalid votes					
Votes cast / turnout					
Abstentions					
Registered voters	648,792				
Sources
Footnotes: ^{1} Within the Unite Andalusia alliance in the 2023 election.

=== 2023 ===
Summary of the 23 July 2023 Congress of Deputies election results in Córdoba
Parties and alliances	Popular vote			Seats	
Parties and alliances	Votes	%	±pp	Total	+/−
People's Party (PP)	169,976	37.89	+15.39	2	±0
Spanish Socialist Workers' Party (PSOE)	144,080	32.12	–0.91	2	±0
Vox (Vox)	62,526	13.94	–4.63	1	±0
Unite Andalusia (Sumar)^{1}	61,594	13.73	–0.85	1	±0
Animalist Party with the Environment (PACMA)^{2}	2,699	0.60	–0.29	0	±0
Blank Seats to Leave Empty Seats (EB)	942	0.21	+0.04	0	±0
Communist Party of the Workers of Spain (PCTE)	746	0.17	+0.10	0	±0
Workers' Front (FO)	701	0.16	New	0	±0
For a Fairer World (PUM+J)	598	0.13	+0.02	0	±0
Zero Cuts (Recortes Cero)	392	0.09	–0.03	0	±0
Blank ballots	4,348	0.97	–0.25		
Total	448,602			6	±0
Valid votes	448,602	98.47	+0.11		
Invalid votes	6,962	1.53	–0.11		
Votes cast / turnout	455,564	70.60	+0.92		
Abstentions	189,724	29.40	–0.92		
Registered voters	645,288				
Sources
Footnotes: ^{1} Unite Andalusia results are compared to United We Can totals in the November 2019 election.; ^{2} Animalist Party with the Environment results are compared to Animalist Party Against Mistreatment of Animals totals in the November 2019 election.

=== November 2019 ===
Summary of the 10 November 2019 Congress of Deputies election results in Córdoba
Parties and alliances	Popular vote			Seats	
Parties and alliances	Votes	%	±pp	Total	+/−
Spanish Socialist Workers' Party (PSOE)	146,761	33.03	–1.38	2	±0
People's Party (PP)	99,999	22.50	+3.67	2	+1
Vox (Vox)	82,534	18.57	+6.55	1	±0
United We Can (Podemos–IULV–CA)	64,769	14.58	–0.29	1	±0
Citizens–Party of the Citizenry (Cs)	36,229	8.15	–8.73	0	–1
Animalist Party Against Mistreatment of Animals (PACMA)	3,946	0.89	–0.15	0	±0
Spanish Communist Workers' Party (PCOE)	1,062	0.24	–0.02	0	±0
Andalusia by Herself (AxSí)	1,019	0.23	New	0	±0
Blank Seats (EB)	760	0.17	±0.00	0	±0
Zero Cuts–Green Group (Recortes Cero–GV)	549	0.12	–0.04	0	±0
Communist Party of the Andalusian People (PCPA)	544	0.12	–0.05	0	±0
For a Fairer World (PUM+J)	478	0.11	+0.01	0	±0
Communist Party of the Workers of Spain (PCTE)	321	0.07	–0.02	0	±0
Blank ballots	5,405	1.22	+0.22		
Total	444,376			6	±0
Valid votes	444,376	98.36	–0.17		
Invalid votes	7,399	1.64	+0.17		
Votes cast / turnout	451,775	69.68	–4.42		
Abstentions	196,566	30.32	+4.42		
Registered voters	648,341				

=== April 2019 ===
Summary of the 28 April 2019 Congress of Deputies election results in Córdoba
Parties and alliances	Popular vote			Seats	
Parties and alliances	Votes	%	±pp	Total	+/−
Spanish Socialist Workers' Party (PSOE)	163,000	34.41	+3.24	2	±0
People's Party (PP)	89,203	18.83	–15.58	1	–1
Citizens–Party of the Citizenry (Cs)	79,978	16.88	+4.52	1	±0
United We Can (Podemos–IULV–CA–Equo)	70,427	14.87	–4.17	1	±0
Vox (Vox)	56,919	12.02	+11.86	1	+1
Animalist Party Against Mistreatment of Animals (PACMA)	4,946	1.04	+0.09	0	±0
Spanish Communist Workers' Party (PCOE)	1,233	0.26	+0.12	0	±0
Communist Party of the Andalusian People (PCPA)	816	0.17	+0.02	0	±0
Blank Seats (EB)	788	0.17	+0.03	0	±0
Zero Cuts–Green Group (Recortes Cero–GV)	756	0.16	+0.06	0	±0
For a Fairer World (PUM+J)	469	0.10	New	0	±0
Communist Party of the Workers of Spain (PCTE)	426	0.09	New	0	±0
Blank ballots	4,755	1.00	±0.00		
Total	473,716			6	±0
Valid votes	473,716	98.53	–0.32		
Invalid votes	7,057	1.47	+0.32		
Votes cast / turnout	480,773	74.10	+4.68		
Abstentions	168,017	25.90	–4.68		
Registered voters	648,790				

=== 2016 ===
Summary of the 26 June 2016 Congress of Deputies election results in Córdoba
Parties and alliances	Popular vote			Seats	
Parties and alliances	Votes	%	±pp	Total	+/−
People's Party (PP)	153,750	34.41	+4.02	2	±0
Spanish Socialist Workers' Party (PSOE)	139,281	31.17	–0.87	2	±0
United We Can for Andalusia (Podemos–IU–Equo)^{1}	85,058	19.04	–3.71	1	±0
Citizens–Party of the Citizenry (C's)	55,248	12.36	+0.43	1	±0
Animalist Party Against Mistreatment of Animals (PACMA)	4,234	0.95	+0.20	0	±0
Union, Progress and Democracy (UPyD)	743	0.17	–0.27	0	±0
Vox (Vox)	708	0.16	New	0	±0
Communist Party of the Peoples of Spain (PCPE)	663	0.15	–0.04	0	±0
Spanish Communist Workers' Party (PCOE)	627	0.14	–0.05	0	±0
Blank Seats (EB)	614	0.14	+0.01	0	±0
We Are Andalusians Party, For Andalusia and the Peoples (AND)	606	0.14	New	0	±0
Zero Cuts–Green Group (Recortes Cero–GV)	467	0.10	–0.03	0	±0
Spanish Phalanx of the CNSO (FE de las JONS)	330	0.07	–0.04	0	±0
Blank ballots	4,489	1.00	+0.04		
Total	446,818			6	±0
Valid votes	446,818	98.85	–0.08		
Invalid votes	5,220	1.15	+0.08		
Votes cast / turnout	452,038	69.42	–3.11		
Abstentions	199,146	30.58	+3.11		
Registered voters	651,184				
Sources
Footnotes: ^{1} United We Can results are compared to the combined totals of We Can and United Left/Greens–Assembly for Andalusia–Popular Unity in Common in the 2015 election.

=== 2015 ===
Summary of the 20 December 2015 Congress of Deputies election results in Córdoba
Parties and alliances	Popular vote			Seats	
Parties and alliances	Votes	%	±pp	Total	+/−
Spanish Socialist Workers' Party (PSOE)	149,851	32.04	–4.31	2	–1
People's Party (PP)	142,101	30.39	–14.22	2	–1
We Can (Podemos)	68,740	14.70	New	1	+1
Citizens–Party of the Citizenry (C's)	55,812	11.93	New	1	+1
United Left/Greens–Assembly for Andalusia–Popular Unity (IULV–CA–UPeC)	37,650	8.05	–1.78	0	±0
Animalist Party Against Mistreatment of Animals (PACMA)	3,529	0.75	New	0	±0
Union, Progress and Democracy (UPyD)	2,069	0.44	–3.40	0	±0
Communist Party of the Peoples of Spain (PCPE)	876	0.19	–0.02	0	±0
Spanish Communist Workers' Party (PCOE)	813	0.17	New	0	±0
Blank Seats (EB)	631	0.13	–0.25	0	±0
Zero Cuts–Green Group (Recortes Cero–GV)	605	0.13	New	0	±0
Spanish Phalanx of the CNSO (FE de las JONS)	494	0.11	±0.00	0	±0
Blank ballots	4,481	0.96	–0.42		
Total	467,652			6	±0
Valid votes	467,652	98.93	+0.03		
Invalid votes	5,044	1.07	–0.03		
Votes cast / turnout	472,696	72.53	–0.14		
Abstentions	179,031	27.47	+0.14		
Registered voters	651,727				

=== 2011 ===
Summary of the 20 November 2011 Congress of Deputies election results in Córdoba
Parties and alliances	Popular vote			Seats	
Parties and alliances	Votes	%	±pp	Total	+/−
People's Party (PP)	209,067	44.61	+7.00	3	+1
Spanish Socialist Workers' Party (PSOE)	170,367	36.35	–14.50	3	–1
United Left/The Greens–Assembly for Andalusia: Plural Left (IULV–CA)	46,066	9.83	+2.79	0	±0
Union, Progress and Democracy (UPyD)	17,998	3.84	+3.26	0	±0
Andalusian Party (PA)^{1}	10,453	2.23	+0.59	0	±0
Equo (Equo)	3,782	0.81	New	0	±0
Blank Seats (EB)	1,786	0.38	New	0	±0
Communist Party of the Peoples of Spain (PCPE)	982	0.21	+0.12	0	±0
For a Fairer World (PUM+J)	701	0.15	–0.02	0	±0
Spanish Phalanx of the CNSO (FE de las JONS)	502	0.11	+0.06	0	±0
Internationalist Solidarity and Self-Management (SAIn)	241	0.05	–0.02	0	±0
Communist Unification of Spain (UCE)	188	0.04	New	0	±0
Blank ballots	6,490	1.38	+0.25		
Total	468,623			6	±0
Valid votes	468,623	98.90	–0.49		
Invalid votes	5,224	1.10	+0.49		
Votes cast / turnout	473,847	72.67	–3.14		
Abstentions	178,239	27.33	+3.14		
Registered voters	652,086				
Sources
Footnotes: ^{1} Andalusian Party results are compared to Andalusian Coalition totals in the 2008 election.

=== 2008 ===
Summary of the 9 March 2008 Congress of Deputies election results in Córdoba
Parties and alliances	Popular vote			Seats	
Parties and alliances	Votes	%	±pp	Total	+/−
Spanish Socialist Workers' Party (PSOE)	246,470	50.85	+0.99	4	±0
People's Party (PP)	182,307	37.61	+3.87	2	–1
United Left/The Greens–Assembly for Andalusia–Alternative (IULV–CA)	34,131	7.04	–2.66	0	±0
Andalusian Coalition (CA)^{1}	7,972	1.64	–2.66	0	±0
Union, Progress and Democracy (UPyD)	2,797	0.58	New	0	±0
The Greens (Verdes)	1,229	0.25	New	0	±0
For a Fairer World (PUM+J)	815	0.17	New	0	±0
Anti-Bullfighting Party Against Mistreatment of Animals (PACMA)	591	0.12	New	0	±0
Social Democratic Party (PSD)	517	0.11	New	0	±0
Communist Party of the Peoples of Spain (PCPE)	418	0.09	+0.09	0	±0
Spanish Alternative (AES)	371	0.08	New	0	±0
Citizens–Party of the Citizenry (C's)	356	0.07	New	0	±0
Internationalist Solidarity and Self-Management (SAIn)	321	0.07	New	0	±0
Spanish Phalanx of the CNSO (FE de las JONS)	259	0.05	+0.01	0	±0
Family and Life Party (PFyV)	219	0.05	–0.03	0	±0
Humanist Party (PH)	207	0.04	–0.04	0	±0
National Democracy (DN)	194	0.04	±0.00	0	±0
National Alliance (AN)	77	0.02	New	0	±0
Blank ballots	5,460	1.13	–0.54		
Total	484,711			6	–1
Valid votes	484,711	99.39	+0.01		
Invalid votes	2,970	0.61	–0.01		
Votes cast / turnout	487,681	75.81	–2.70		
Abstentions	155,632	24.19	+2.70		
Registered voters	643,313				
Sources
Footnotes: ^{1} Andalusian Coalition results are compared to the combined totals of Andalusian Party and Socialist Party of Andalusia in the 2004 election.

=== 2004 ===
Summary of the 14 March 2004 Congress of Deputies election results in Córdoba
Parties and alliances	Popular vote			Seats	
Parties and alliances	Votes	%	±pp	Total	+/−
Spanish Socialist Workers' Party (PSOE)	246,324	49.86	+9.31	4	+1
People's Party (PP)	166,665	33.74	–7.12	3	±0
United Left/The Greens–Assembly for Andalusia (IULV–CA)	47,908	9.70	–2.24	0	–1
Andalusian Party (PA)	19,648	3.98	–0.56	0	±0
Socialist Party of Andalusia (PSA)	1,558	0.32	New	0	±0
Citizens for Blank Votes (CenB)	736	0.15	New	0	±0
Andalusia Assembly (A)	456	0.09	+0.01	0	±0
Family and Life Party (PFyV)	413	0.08	New	0	±0
Democratic and Social Centre (CDS)	390	0.08	+0.04	0	±0
Humanist Party (PH)	390	0.08	+0.02	0	±0
Republican Left (IR)	356	0.07	New	0	±0
Spanish Democratic Party (PADE)	227	0.05	+0.02	0	±0
National Democracy (DN)	190	0.04	New	0	±0
Spanish Phalanx of the CNSO (FE de las JONS)^{1}	179	0.04	+0.01	0	±0
The Phalanx (FE)	161	0.03	–0.01	0	±0
Republican Social Movement (MSR)	134	0.03	New	0	±0
Communist Party of the Peoples of Spain (PCPE)	0	0.00	–0.12	0	±0
Blank ballots	8,256	1.67	+0.37		
Total	493,991			7	±0
Valid votes	493,991	99.38	+0.10		
Invalid votes	3,096	0.62	–0.10		
Votes cast / turnout	497,087	78.51	+3.74		
Abstentions	136,068	21.49	–3.74		
Registered voters	633,155				
Sources
Footnotes: ^{1} Spanish Phalanx of the CNSO results are compared to Independent Spanish Phalanx–Phalanx 2000 totals in the 2000 election.

=== 2000 ===
Summary of the 12 March 2000 Congress of Deputies election results in Córdoba
Parties and alliances	Popular vote			Seats	
Parties and alliances	Votes	%	±pp	Total	+/−
People's Party (PP)	188,636	40.86	+7.85	3	+1
Spanish Socialist Workers' Party–Progressives (PSOE–p)	187,195	40.55	–4.09	3	–1
United Left/The Greens–Assembly for Andalusia (IULV–CA)	55,125	11.94	–6.63	1	±0
Andalusian Party (PA)	20,963	4.54	+1.87	0	±0
Andalusian Left (IA)	861	0.19	New	0	±0
Liberal Independent Group (GIL)	564	0.12	New	0	±0
Communist Party of the Peoples of Spain (PCPE)	560	0.12	–0.02	0	±0
Andalusia Assembly (A)	349	0.08	New	0	±0
Humanist Party (PH)	290	0.06	+0.01	0	±0
Andalusian Nation (NA)	221	0.05	–0.01	0	±0
Natural Law Party (PLN)	207	0.04	New	0	±0
Centrist Union–Democratic and Social Centre (UC–CDS)	185	0.04	–0.02	0	±0
The Phalanx (FE)	178	0.04	New	0	±0
Independent Spanish Phalanx–Phalanx 2000 (FEI–FE 2000)	136	0.03	New	0	±0
Spanish Democratic Party (PADE)	119	0.03	New	0	±0
Spain 2000 Platform (ES2000)	105	0.02	New	0	±0
Blank ballots	6,001	1.30	+0.61		
Total	461,695			7	±0
Valid votes	461,695	99.28	–0.16		
Invalid votes	3,356	0.72	+0.16		
Votes cast / turnout	465,051	74.77	–7.54		
Abstentions	156,920	25.23	+7.54		
Registered voters	621,971				

=== 1996 ===
Summary of the 3 March 1996 Congress of Deputies election results in Córdoba
Parties and alliances	Popular vote			Seats	
Parties and alliances	Votes	%	±pp	Total	+/−
Spanish Socialist Workers' Party of Andalusia (PSOE–A)	220,659	44.64	–4.60	4	±0
People's Party (PP)	163,155	33.01	+5.44	2	±0
United Left/The Greens–Assembly for Andalusia (IULV–CA)	91,773	18.57	+1.25	1	±0
Andalusian Party (PA)^{1}	13,194	2.67	–0.50	0	±0
Communist Party of the Andalusian People (PCPA)	711	0.14	–0.05	0	±0
Workers' Revolutionary Party (PRT)	295	0.06	New	0	±0
Andalusian Nation (NA)	290	0.06	New	0	±0
Centrist Union (UC)	281	0.06	–0.93	0	±0
Authentic Spanish Phalanx (FEA)	266	0.05	New	0	±0
Humanist Party (PH)	245	0.05	+0.02	0	±0
Blank ballots	3,415	0.69	+0.20		
Total	494,284			7	±0
Valid votes	494,284	99.44	–0.21		
Invalid votes	2,796	0.56	+0.21		
Votes cast / turnout	497,080	82.31	+1.77		
Abstentions	106,799	17.69	–1.77		
Registered voters	603,879				
Sources
Footnotes: ^{1} Andalusian Party results are compared to the combined totals of Andalusian Party and Andalusian Progress Party in the 1993 election.

=== 1993 ===
Summary of the 6 June 1993 Congress of Deputies election results in Córdoba
Parties and alliances	Popular vote			Seats	
Parties and alliances	Votes	%	±pp	Total	+/−
Spanish Socialist Workers' Party of Andalusia (PSOE–A)	230,258	49.24	–0.12	4	–1
People's Party (PP)	128,898	27.57	+9.36	2	+1
United Left–Assembly for Andalusia (IU–CA)	80,977	17.32	–1.02	1	±0
Andalusian Party (PA)	12,564	2.69	–3.19	0	±0
Democratic and Social Centre (CDS)	4,648	0.99	–4.03	0	±0
Andalusian Progress Party (PAP)	2,264	0.48	New	0	±0
The Greens of Andalusia (Verdes)^{1}	1,530	0.33	+0.01	0	±0
Liberal Independent Group (GIL)	1,298	0.28	New	0	±0
The Ecologists (LE)	956	0.20	–0.07	0	±0
Communist Party of the Andalusian People (PCPA)	885	0.19	+0.02	0	±0
Ruiz-Mateos Group–European Democratic Alliance (ARM–ADE)	457	0.10	–1.06	0	±0
Spanish Phalanx of the CNSO (FE–JONS)	195	0.04	–0.05	0	±0
Natural Law Party (PLN)	134	0.03	New	0	±0
Humanist Party (PH)	123	0.02	–0.03	0	±0
Coalition for a New Socialist Party (CNPS)^{2}	110	0.02	–0.03	0	±0
Communist Unification of Spain (UCE)	0	0.00	New	0	±0
Blank ballots	2,301	0.49	+0.12		
Total	467,598			7	±0
Valid votes	467,598	99.65	+0.22		
Invalid votes	1,625	0.35	–0.22		
Votes cast / turnout	469,223	80.54	+5.36		
Abstentions	113,401	19.46	–5.36		
Registered voters	582,624				
Sources
Footnotes: ^{1} The Greens of Andalusia results are compared to The Greens–Green List totals in the 1989 election.; ^{2} Coalition for a New Socialist Party results are compared to Alliance for the Republic totals in the 1989 election.

=== 1989 ===
Summary of the 29 October 1989 Congress of Deputies election results in Córdoba
Parties and alliances	Popular vote			Seats	
Parties and alliances	Votes	%	±pp	Total	+/−
Spanish Socialist Workers' Party of Andalusia (PSOE–A)	207,503	49.36	–4.19	5	+1
United Left–Assembly for Andalusia (IU–CA)	77,106	18.34	+6.13	1	±0
People's Party (PP)^{1}	76,561	18.21	–3.48	1	–1
Andalusian Party (PA)	24,714	5.88	+2.96	0	±0
Democratic and Social Centre (CDS)	21,110	5.02	–1.49	0	±0
Ruiz-Mateos Group (Ruiz-Mateos)	4,893	1.16	New	0	±0
Workers' Party of Spain–Communist Unity (PTE–UC)^{2}	1,504	0.36	–0.42	0	±0
The Greens–Green List (LV–LV)	1,343	0.32	New	0	±0
Workers' Socialist Party (PST)	1,271	0.30	+0.08	0	±0
The Ecologist Greens (LVE)	1,153	0.27	New	0	±0
Communist Party of the Andalusian People (PCPA)	705	0.17	New	0	±0
Spanish Phalanx of the CNSO (FE–JONS)	368	0.09	+0.05	0	±0
Alliance for the Republic (AxR)^{3}	216	0.05	–0.03	0	±0
Humanist Party (PH)	214	0.05	New	0	±0
Centrist Unity–Democratic Spanish Party (PED)	160	0.04	New	0	±0
Blank ballots	1,565	0.37	–0.20		
Total	420,386			7	±0
Valid votes	420,386	99.43	+0.59		
Invalid votes	2,391	0.57	–0.59		
Votes cast / turnout	422,777	75.18	–1.18		
Abstentions	139,571	24.82	+1.18		
Registered voters	562,348				
Sources
Footnotes: ^{1} People's Party results are compared to People's Coalition totals in the 1986 election.; ^{2} Workers' Party of Spain–Communist Unity results are compared to Communists' Unity Board totals in the 1986 election.; ^{3} Alliance for the Republic results are compared to Internationalist Socialist Workers' Party totals in the 1986 election.

=== 1986 ===
Summary of the 22 June 1986 Congress of Deputies election results in Córdoba
Parties and alliances	Popular vote			Seats	
Parties and alliances	Votes	%	±pp	Total	+/−
Spanish Socialist Workers' Party (PSOE)	223,759	53.55	–3.67	4	–1
People's Coalition (AP–PDP–PL)^{1}	90,637	21.69	+0.53	2	±0
United Left (IU)^{2}	51,007	12.21	+3.38	1	+1
Democratic and Social Centre (CDS)	27,211	6.51	+5.25	0	±0
Andalusian Party (PA)	12,211	2.92	+0.74	0	±0
Democratic Reformist Party (PRD)	4,075	0.98	New	0	±0
Communists' Unity Board (MUC)	3,246	0.78	New	0	±0
Socialist Party of the Andalusian People (PSPA)	1,109	0.27	New	0	±0
Workers' Socialist Party (PST)	903	0.22	–0.22	0	±0
Communist Unification of Spain (UCE)	534	0.13	+0.06	0	±0
Internationalist Socialist Workers' Party (POSI)	327	0.08	New	0	±0
Republican Popular Unity (UPR)^{3}	315	0.08	+0.04	0	±0
Spanish Phalanx of the CNSO (FE–JONS)	170	0.04	New	0	±0
Party of the Communists of Catalonia (PCC)	0	0.00	New	0	±0
Blank ballots	2,383	0.57	–0.67		
Total	417,887			7	±0
Valid votes	417,887	98.84	+0.88		
Invalid votes	4,887	1.16	–0.88		
Votes cast / turnout	422,774	76.36	–8.21		
Abstentions	130,918	23.64	+8.21		
Registered voters	553,692				
Sources
Footnotes: ^{1} People's Coalition results are compared to People's Alliance–People's Democratic Party totals in the 1982 election.; ^{2} United Left results are compared to Communist Party of Andalusia totals in the 1982 election.; ^{3} Republican Popular Unity results are compared to Communist Party of Spain (Marxist–Leninist) totals in the 1982 election.

=== 1982 ===
Summary of the 28 October 1982 Congress of Deputies election results in Córdoba
Parties and alliances	Popular vote			Seats	
Parties and alliances	Votes	%	±pp	Total	+/−
Spanish Socialist Workers' Party of Andalusia (PSA–PSOE)	243,428	57.22	+27.14	5	+2
People's Alliance–People's Democratic Party (AP–PDP)^{1}	90,023	21.16	+15.51	2	+2
Communist Party of Andalusia (PCA–PCE)	37,555	8.83	–10.25	0	–1
Union of the Democratic Centre (UCD)	28,414	6.68	–23.26	0	–3
Socialist Party of Andalusia–Andalusian Party (PSA–PA)	9,270	2.18	–7.78	0	±0
Democratic and Social Centre (CDS)	5,358	1.26	New	0	±0
Workers' Socialist Party (PST)	1,886	0.44	New	0	±0
New Force (FN)^{2}	1,556	0.37	–1.64	0	±0
Spanish Communist Workers' Party (PCOE)	956	0.22	New	0	±0
Spanish Solidarity (SE)	489	0.11	New	0	±0
Communist Unity Candidacy (CUC)^{3}	473	0.11	–0.06	0	±0
Communist Unification of Spain (UCE)	285	0.07	New	0	±0
Communist League–Internationalist Socialist Workers' Coalition (LC (COSI))	265	0.06	New	0	±0
Communist Party of Spain (Marxist–Leninist) (PCE (m–l))	175	0.04	New	0	±0
Communist Movement of Andalusia (MCA)	0	0.00	–0.29	0	±0
Socialist Party (PS)^{4}	0	0.00	–0.86	0	±0
Falangist Movement of Spain (MFE)	0	0.00	New	0	±0
Revolutionary Communist League (LCR)	0	0.00	New	0	±0
Blank ballots	5,264	1.24	+1.09		
Total	425,397			7	±0
Valid votes	425,397	97.96	–1.03		
Invalid votes	8,875	2.04	+1.03		
Votes cast / turnout	434,272	84.57	+11.69		
Abstentions	79,249	15.43	–11.69		
Registered voters	513,521				
Sources
Footnotes: ^{1} People's Alliance–People's Democratic Party results are compared to Democratic Coalition totals in the 1979 election.; ^{2} New Force results are compared to National Union totals in the 1979 election.; ^{3} Communist Unity Candidacy results are compared to Workers' Communist Party totals in the 1979 election.; ^{4} Socialist Party results are compared to Spanish Socialist Workers' Party (historical) totals in the 1979 election.

=== 1979 ===
Summary of the 1 March 1979 Congress of Deputies election results in Córdoba
Parties and alliances	Popular vote			Seats	
Parties and alliances	Votes	%	±pp	Total	+/−
Spanish Socialist Workers' Party (PSOE)^{1}	111,237	30.08	–7.40	3	±0
Union of the Democratic Centre (UCD)	110,734	29.94	–2.54	3	±0
Communist Party of Spain (PCE)	70,554	19.08	+2.58	1	±0
Socialist Party of Andalusia–Andalusian Party (PSA–PA)	36,826	9.96	New	0	±0
Democratic Coalition (CD)^{2}	20,909	5.65	–3.64	0	±0
National Union (UN)^{3}	7,427	2.01	+1.53	0	±0
Party of Labour of Spain (PTE)^{4}	4,080	1.10	–0.02	0	±0
Spanish Socialist Workers' Party (historical) (PSOEh)^{5}	3,168	0.86	+0.60	0	±0
Communist Movement–Organization of Communist Left (MC–OIC)	1,078	0.29	New	0	±0
Communist Organization of Spain (Red Flag) (OCE–BR)	1,063	0.29	New	0	±0
Workers' Communist Party (PCT)	634	0.17	New	0	±0
Republican Left (IR)	581	0.16	New	0	±0
Spanish Phalanx of the CNSO (Authentic) (FE–JONS(A))	523	0.14	–0.05	0	±0
Workers' Revolutionary Organization (ORT)	467	0.13	New	0	±0
Blank ballots	568	0.15	+0.04		
Total	369,849			7	±0
Valid votes	369,849	98.99	–0.01		
Invalid votes	3,778	1.01	+0.01		
Votes cast / turnout	373,627	72.88	–8.12		
Abstentions	139,006	27.12	+8.12		
Registered voters	512,633				
Sources
Footnotes: ^{1} Spanish Socialist Workers' Party results are compared to the combined totals of Spanish Socialist Workers' Party and People's Socialist Party–Socialist Unity in the 1977 election.; ^{2} Democratic Coalition results are compared to People's Alliance totals in the 1977 election.; ^{3} National Union results are compared to National Alliance July 18 totals in the 1977 election.; ^{4} Party of Labour of Spain results are compared to Democratic Left Front totals in the 1977 election.; ^{5} Spanish Socialist Workers' Party (historical) results are compared to Democratic Socialist Alliance totals in the 1977 election.

=== 1977 ===
Summary of the 15 June 1977 Congress of Deputies election results in Córdoba
Parties and alliances	Popular vote			Seats	
Parties and alliances	Votes	%	±pp	Total	+/−
Spanish Socialist Workers' Party (PSOE)	122,361	33.83	n/a	3	n/a
Union of the Democratic Centre (UCD)	117,482	32.48	n/a	3	n/a
Communist Party of Spain (PCE)	59,668	16.50	n/a	1	n/a
People's Alliance (AP)	33,616	9.29	n/a	0	n/a
People's Socialist Party–Socialist Unity (PSP–US)	13,195	3.65	n/a	0	n/a
Democratic Left Front (FDI)	4,056	1.12	n/a	0	n/a
Federation of Christian Democracy (FPD–ID)	2,984	0.83	n/a	0	n/a
National Alliance July 18 (AN18)	1,718	0.48	n/a	0	n/a
Independent Candidacy (INDEP)	1,684	0.47	n/a	0	n/a
Front for Workers' Unity (FUT)	1,463	0.40	n/a	0	n/a
Spanish Social Reform (RSE)	1,413	0.39	n/a	0	n/a
Democratic Socialist Alliance (ASDCI)	923	0.26	n/a	0	n/a
Spanish Phalanx of the CNSO (Authentic) (FE–JONS(A))	693	0.19	n/a	0	n/a
Blank ballots	405	0.11	n/a		
Total	361,661			7	n/a
Valid votes	361,661	99.00	n/a		
Invalid votes	3,647	1.00	n/a		
Votes cast / turnout	365,308	81.00	n/a		
Abstentions	85,713	19.00	n/a		
Registered voters	451,021				

== Bibliography ==
- Ley 1/1977, de 4 de enero, para la Reforma Política (Fundamental Law 1/1977). Official State Gazette (in Spanish). 4 January 1977. BOE-A-1977-165.
- Real Decreto-ley 20/1977, de 18 de marzo, sobre Normas Electorales (Royal Decree-Law 20/1977). Official State Gazette (in Spanish). 18 March 1977. BOE-A-1977-7445.
- Constitución Española (Constitution). Official State Gazette (in Spanish). 27 December 1978. BOE-A-1978-31229.
- Ley Orgánica 5/1985, de 19 de junio, del Régimen Electoral General (Organic Law 5/1985). Official State Gazette (in Spanish). 19 June 1985. BOE-A-1985-11672.
- Carreras de Odriozola, Albert; Tafunell Sambola, Xavier (2005) [1989]. Estadísticas históricas de España, siglos XIX-XX (PDF) (in Spanish). Vol. 1 (II ed.). Bilbao: Fundación BBVA. pp. 1072–1097. ISBN 84-96515-00-1. Archived from the original (PDF) on 24 September 2015.
