= Ávila (Congress of Deputies constituency) =

Electoral constituency in Spain

Coordinates: 40°35′N 5°00′W

- Congress of Deputies; Electoral constituency
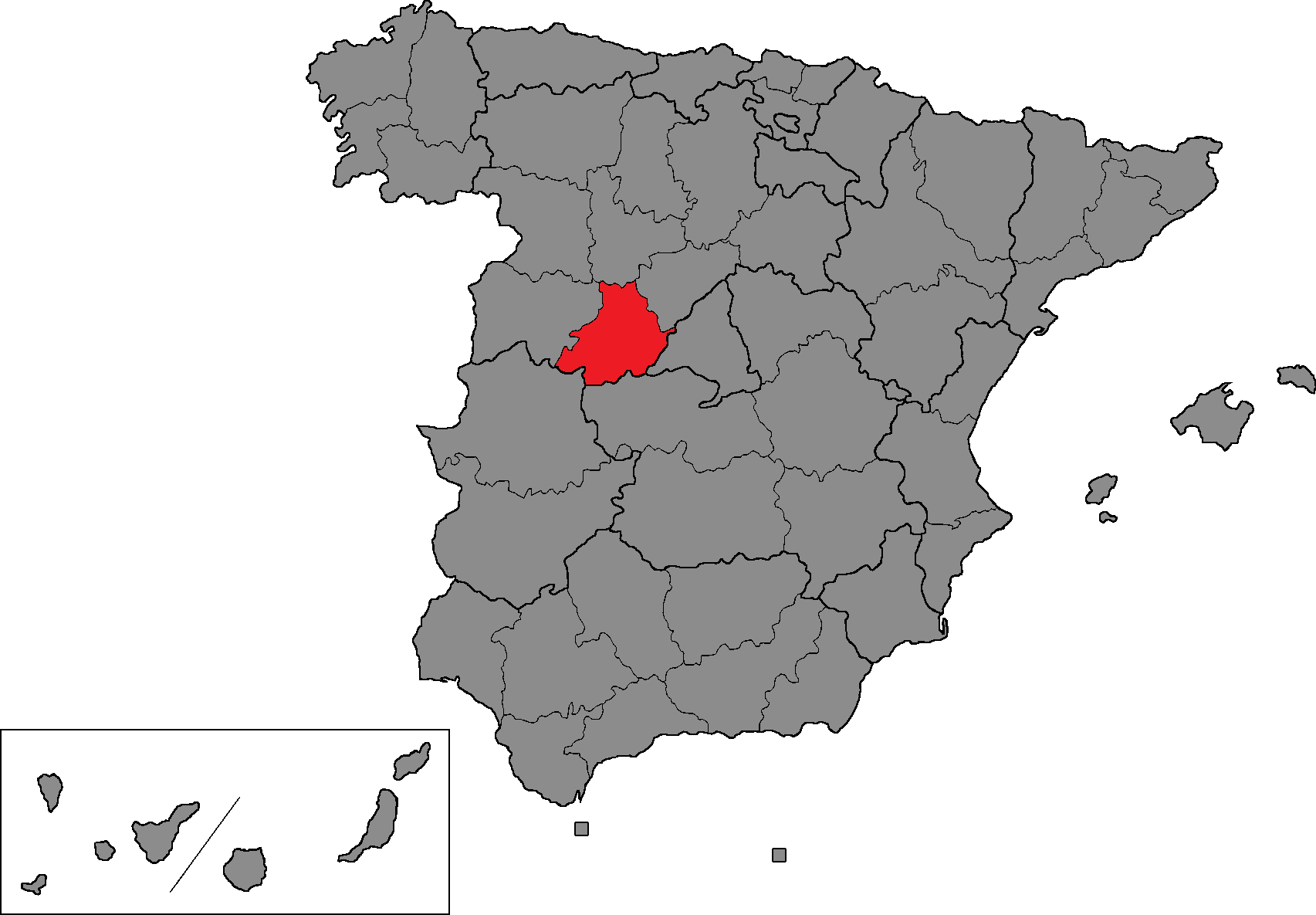
- Location of Ávila within Spain
- Province: Ávila
- Autonomous community: Castile and León
- Population: ▲158,989 (2024)
- Electorate: ▼136,669 (2023)
- Major settlements: Ávila

Current constituency
- Created: 1977
- Seats: 3
- Members: PP (2); PSOE (1)

Ávila is one of the 52 constituencies represented in the Congress of Deputies, the lower chamber of the Spanish parliament, the Cortes Generales. The constituency (whose boundaries correspond to those of the homonymous province) currently elects three deputies. The electoral system uses the D'Hondt method and closed-list proportional voting, with a minimum threshold of three percent.

== Electoral system ==
The constituency was created as per the Political Reform Law and was first contested in the 1977 general election. The Law provided for the provinces of Spain to be established as multi-member districts in the Congress of Deputies, with this regulation being maintained under the Spanish Constitution of 1978. Additionally, the Constitution requires for any modification of the provincial limits to be approved under an organic law, needing an absolute majority in the Cortes Generales.

Voting is based on universal suffrage, comprising all Spanish nationals over 18 years of age with full political rights, provided that they have not been deprived of the right to vote by a final sentence. The only exception was in 1977, when this was limited to nationals over 21 years of age and in full enjoyment of their political and civil rights. Amendments in 2011 required non-resident citizens to apply for voting, a system known as "begged" voting (Spanish: Voto rogado). which was abolished in 2022. Further, amendments in 2018 granted the right to vote to those legally incapacitated. The Congress of Deputies has a minimum of 300 and a maximum of 400 seats, with electoral provisions fixing its size at 350. Of these, 348 are elected in 50 multi-member constituencies corresponding to the provinces of Spain—each of which is assigned an initial minimum of two seats and the remaining 248 distributed in proportion to population—using the D'Hondt method and closed-list proportional voting, with a three percent-threshold of valid votes (including blank ballots) in each constituency. The remaining two seats are allocated to Ceuta and Melilla as single-member districts elected by plurality voting. The use of this electoral method may result in a higher effective threshold depending on district magnitude and vote distribution. The law does not provide for by-elections to fill vacant seats; instead, any vacancies arising after the proclamation of candidates and during the legislative term are filled by the next candidates on the party lists or, when required, by designated substitutes.

The electoral law allows for parties and federations registered in the interior ministry, alliances and groupings of electors to present lists of candidates. Parties and federations intending to form an alliance are required to inform the relevant electoral commission within 10 days of the election call—15 before 1985—whereas groupings of electors need to secure the signature of at least one percent of the electorate in the constituencies for which they seek election—one permille of the electorate, with a compulsory minimum of 500 signatures, until 1985—disallowing electors from signing for more than one list. Also since 2011, parties, federations or alliances that have not obtained a mandate in either chamber of the Cortes at the preceding election are required to secure the signature of at least 0.1 percent of electors in the aforementioned constituencies. Amendments in 2007 required a balanced composition of men and women in the electoral lists, so that candidates of either sex made up at least 40 percent of the total composition; further amendments in 2024 required the use of a zipper system.

== Deputies ==
Deputies 1977–present
Key to parties PSOE CDS Cs UCD PP CP AP Vox
Legislature	Election	Distribution
Constituent	1977	3
1st	1979	3
2nd	1982	1 / 1 / 1
3rd	1986	1 / 1 / 1
4th	1989	1 / 1 / 1
5th	1993	1 / 2
6th	1996	1 / 2
7th	2000	1 / 2
8th	2004	1 / 2
9th	2008	1 / 2
10th	2011	1 / 2
11th	2015	1 / 2
12th	2016	1 / 2
13th	2019 (Apr)	1 / 1 / 1
14th	2019 (Nov)	1 / 1 / 1
15th	2023	1 / 2

== General elections ==
=== 2026 ===
Summary of the 29 November 2026 Congress of Deputies election results in Ávila
Parties and alliances	Popular vote			Seats	
Parties and alliances	Votes	%	±pp	Total	+/−
People's Party (PP)					
Spanish Socialist Workers' Party (PSOE)					
Vox (Vox)					
Broad Front (FA)^{1}			n/a		
We Can (Podemos)^{1}			n/a		
Workers' Front (FO)					
For a Fairer World (M+J)					
Communist Party of the Workers of Spain (PCTE)					
The Party is Over (SALF)			New		
European Retirees Social Democratic Party (PDSJE)			New		
Blank ballots					
Total				3	±0
Valid votes					
Invalid votes					
Votes cast / turnout					
Abstentions					
Registered voters	136,598				
Sources
Footnotes: ^{1} Within the Unite alliance in the 2023 election.

=== 2023 ===
Summary of the 23 July 2023 Congress of Deputies election results in Ávila
Parties and alliances	Popular vote			Seats	
Parties and alliances	Votes	%	±pp	Total	+/−
People's Party (PP)	42,369	43.25	+8.46	2	+1
Spanish Socialist Workers' Party (PSOE)	26,828	27.39	+1.21	1	±0
Vox (Vox)	15,068	15.38	–3.14	0	–1
For Ávila (XAV)	7,362	7.52	+1.73	0	±0
Unite (Sumar)^{1}	5,027	5.13	–1.35	0	±0
Animalist Party with the Environment (PACMA)^{2}	275	0.28	–0.18	0	±0
Workers' Front (FO)	100	0.10	New	0	±0
For a Fairer World (PUM+J)	91	0.09	–0.02	0	±0
Communist Party of the Workers of Spain (PCTE)	85	0.09	–0.02	0	±0
Spanish Phalanx of the CNSO (FE de las JONS)	77	0.08	+0.01	0	±0
Zero Cuts (Recortes Cero)	42	0.04	–0.07	0	±0
Blank ballots	632	0.65	–0.16		
Total	97,956			3	±0
Valid votes	97,956	98.83	+0.20		
Invalid votes	1,164	1.17	–0.20		
Votes cast / turnout	99,120	72.53	+3.19		
Abstentions	37,549	27.47	–3.19		
Registered voters	136,669				
Sources
Footnotes: ^{1} Unite results are compared to United We Can totals in the November 2019 election.; ^{2} Animalist Party with the Environment results are compared to Animalist Party Against Mistreatment of Animals totals in the November 2019 election.

=== November 2019 ===
Summary of the 10 November 2019 Congress of Deputies election results in Ávila
Parties and alliances	Popular vote			Seats	
Parties and alliances	Votes	%	±pp	Total	+/−
People's Party (PP)	32,527	34.79	+3.44	1	±0
Spanish Socialist Workers' Party (PSOE)	24,474	26.18	+0.22	1	±0
Vox (Vox)	17,313	18.52	+4.19	1	+1
Citizens–Party of the Citizenry (Cs)	6,119	6.54	–12.17	0	–1
United We Can (Podemos–IU)	6,059	6.48	–1.09	0	±0
For Ávila (XAV)	5,416	5.79	New	0	±0
Animalist Party Against Mistreatment of Animals (PACMA)	432	0.46	–0.20	0	±0
Zero Cuts–Green Group–PCAS–TC (Recortes Cero–GV–PCAS–TC)	105	0.11	–0.06	0	±0
For a Fairer World (PUM+J)	102	0.11	±0.00	0	±0
Communist Party of the Workers of Spain (PCTE)	101	0.11	New	0	±0
Spanish Phalanx of the CNSO (FE de las JONS)	61	0.07	–0.02	0	±0
Libertarian Party (P–LIB)	32	0.03	New	0	±0
Blank ballots	755	0.81	+0.10		
Total	93,496			3	±0
Valid votes	93,496	98.63	±0.00		
Invalid votes	1,297	1.37	±0.00		
Votes cast / turnout	94,793	69.34	–6.14		
Abstentions	41,924	30.66	+6.14		
Registered voters	136,717				

=== April 2019 ===
Summary of the 28 April 2019 Congress of Deputies election results in Ávila
Parties and alliances	Popular vote			Seats	
Parties and alliances	Votes	%	±pp	Total	+/−
People's Party (PP)	32,001	31.35	–20.14	1	–1
Spanish Socialist Workers' Party (PSOE)	26,503	25.96	+6.47	1	±0
Citizens–Party of the Citizenry (Cs)	19,102	18.71	+4.46	1	+1
Vox (Vox)	14,623	14.33	New	0	±0
United We Can (Podemos–IU–Equo)	7,730	7.57	–5.09	0	±0
Animalist Party Against Mistreatment of Animals (PACMA)	673	0.66	+0.04	0	±0
Act (PACT)	347	0.34	New	0	±0
Zero Cuts–Green Group–PCAS–TC (Recortes Cero–GV–PCAS–TC)	169	0.17	+0.03	0	±0
For a Fairer World (PUM+J)	113	0.11	New	0	±0
Spanish Phalanx of the CNSO (FE de las JONS)	96	0.09	–0.17	0	±0
Blank ballots	722	0.71	–0.01		
Total	102,079			3	±0
Valid votes	102,079	98.63	–0.18		
Invalid votes	1,422	1.37	+0.18		
Votes cast / turnout	103,501	75.48	+3.57		
Abstentions	33,618	24.52	–3.57		
Registered voters	137,119				

=== 2016 ===
Summary of the 26 June 2016 Congress of Deputies election results in Ávila
Parties and alliances	Popular vote			Seats	
Parties and alliances	Votes	%	±pp	Total	+/−
People's Party (PP)	50,931	51.49	+5.35	2	±0
Spanish Socialist Workers' Party (PSOE)	19,277	19.49	–0.36	1	±0
Citizens–Party of the Citizenry (C's)	14,096	14.25	–1.41	0	±0
United We Can (Podemos–IU–Equo)^{1}	12,527	12.66	–2.88	0	±0
Animalist Party Against Mistreatment of Animals (PACMA)	610	0.62	+0.11	0	±0
Union, Progress and Democracy (UPyD)	357	0.36	–0.53	0	±0
Spanish Phalanx of the CNSO (FE de las JONS)	261	0.26	+0.03	0	±0
Zero Cuts–Green Group (Recortes Cero–GV)	141	0.14	+0.02	0	±0
Blank ballots	717	0.72	–0.01		
Total	98,917			3	±0
Valid votes	98,917	98.81	+0.01		
Invalid votes	1,189	1.19	–0.01		
Votes cast / turnout	100,106	71.91	–1.86		
Abstentions	39,112	28.09	+1.86		
Registered voters	139,218				
Sources
Footnotes: ^{1} United We Can results are compared to the combined totals of We Can and United Left–Popular Unity in Common in the 2015 election.

=== 2015 ===
Summary of the 20 December 2015 Congress of Deputies election results in Ávila
Parties and alliances	Popular vote			Seats	
Parties and alliances	Votes	%	±pp	Total	+/−
People's Party (PP)	47,072	46.14	–15.76	2	±0
Spanish Socialist Workers' Party (PSOE)	20,254	19.85	–3.06	1	±0
Citizens–Party of the Citizenry (C's)	15,971	15.66	New	0	±0
We Can (Podemos)	11,951	11.71	New	0	±0
United Left–Popular Unity in Common (IU–UPeC)	3,905	3.83	–0.70	0	±0
Union, Progress and Democracy (UPyD)	908	0.89	–6.86	0	±0
Animalist Party Against Mistreatment of Animals (PACMA)	519	0.51	+0.25	0	±0
Vox (Vox)	330	0.32	New	0	±0
Spanish Phalanx of the CNSO (FE de las JONS)	238	0.23	+0.01	0	±0
Zero Cuts–Green Group (Recortes Cero–GV)	125	0.12	New	0	±0
Blank ballots	744	0.73	–0.43		
Total	102,017			3	±0
Valid votes	102,017	98.80	+0.18		
Invalid votes	1,234	1.20	–0.18		
Votes cast / turnout	103,251	73.77	–1.60		
Abstentions	36,704	26.23	+1.60		
Registered voters	139,955				

=== 2011 ===
Summary of the 20 November 2011 Congress of Deputies election results in Ávila
Parties and alliances	Popular vote			Seats	
Parties and alliances	Votes	%	±pp	Total	+/−
People's Party (PP)	65,600	61.90	+3.32	2	±0
Spanish Socialist Workers' Party (PSOE)	24,278	22.91	–12.14	1	±0
Union, Progress and Democracy (UPyD)	8,217	7.75	+6.33	0	±0
United Left of Castile and León: Plural Left (IUCyL)	4,803	4.53	+1.93	0	±0
Equo (Equo)	725	0.68	New	0	±0
Animalist Party Against Mistreatment of Animals (PACMA)	275	0.26	+0.18	0	±0
Spanish Phalanx of the CNSO (FE de las JONS)	233	0.22	+0.15	0	±0
Republicans (RPS)	200	0.19	New	0	±0
Hartos.org (Hartos.org)	174	0.16	New	0	±0
For a Fairer World (PUM+J)	105	0.10	+0.03	0	±0
Family and Life Party (PFyV)	83	0.08	+0.05	0	±0
Communist Unification of Spain (UCE)	50	0.05	New	0	±0
Blank ballots	1,233	1.16	+0.15		
Total	105,976			3	±0
Valid votes	105,976	98.62	–0.54		
Invalid votes	1,481	1.38	+0.54		
Votes cast / turnout	107,457	75.37	–5.07		
Abstentions	35,121	24.63	+5.07		
Registered voters	142,578				

=== 2008 ===
Summary of the 9 March 2008 Congress of Deputies election results in Ávila
Parties and alliances	Popular vote			Seats	
Parties and alliances	Votes	%	±pp	Total	+/−
People's Party (PP)	67,274	58.58	–0.96	2	±0
Spanish Socialist Workers' Party (PSOE)	40,249	35.05	+1.03	1	±0
United Left–Alternative (IU)	2,987	2.60	–0.57	0	±0
Union, Progress and Democracy (UPyD)	1,628	1.42	New	0	±0
Commoners' Land (TC)	194	0.17	–0.30	0	±0
The Greens–Green Group (LV–GV)	134	0.12	New	0	±0
Citizens–Party of the Citizenry (C's)	126	0.11	New	0	±0
The Greens (Verdes)	125	0.11	New	0	±0
Social Democratic Party (PSD)	110	0.10	New	0	±0
The Greens of Europe (LVdE)	97	0.08	New	0	±0
Anti-Bullfighting Party Against Mistreatment of Animals (PACMA)	94	0.08	New	0	±0
For a Fairer World (PUM+J)	86	0.07	New	0	±0
Citizens for Blank Votes (CenB)	77	0.07	–0.05	0	±0
Spanish Phalanx of the CNSO (FE de las JONS)	76	0.07	+0.01	0	±0
Communist Party of the Castilian People (PCPC–PCPE)	74	0.06	+0.01	0	±0
National Democracy (DN)	69	0.06	+0.03	0	±0
Spanish Democratic Centre (CDEs)	52	0.05	New	0	±0
Humanist Party (PH)	52	0.05	–0.05	0	±0
Authentic Phalanx (FA)	50	0.04	±0.00	0	±0
Engine and Sports Alternative (AMD)	37	0.03	New	0	±0
Family and Life Party (PFyV)	32	0.03	–0.05	0	±0
Spanish Alternative (AES)	24	0.02	New	0	±0
Spanish Front (Frente)	14	0.01	New	0	±0
Carlist Traditionalist Communion (CTC)	9	0.01	New	0	±0
Spain 2000 (E–2000)	9	0.01	New	0	±0
Blank ballots	1,156	1.01	–0.75		
Total	114,835			3	±0
Valid votes	114,835	99.16	+0.15		
Invalid votes	971	0.84	–0.15		
Votes cast / turnout	115,806	80.44	+0.58		
Abstentions	28,161	19.56	–0.58		
Registered voters	143,967				

=== 2004 ===
Summary of the 14 March 2004 Congress of Deputies election results in Ávila
Parties and alliances	Popular vote			Seats	
Parties and alliances	Votes	%	±pp	Total	+/−
People's Party (PP)	67,622	59.54	–5.77	2	±0
Spanish Socialist Workers' Party (PSOE)	38,640	34.02	+7.36	1	±0
United Left (IU)	3,598	3.17	–1.60	0	±0
Commoners' Land–Castilian Nationalist Party (TC–PNC)	532	0.47	+0.12	0	±0
Democratic and Social Centre (CDS)	327	0.29	–0.01	0	±0
Citizens for Blank Votes (CenB)	134	0.12	New	0	±0
Humanist Party (PH)	113	0.10	–0.02	0	±0
Republican Left (IR)	97	0.09	New	0	±0
Family and Life Party (PFyV)	87	0.08	New	0	±0
Romantic Mutual Support Party (PMAR)	77	0.07	New	0	±0
The Phalanx (FE)	71	0.06	–0.12	0	±0
Spanish Phalanx of the CNSO (FE de las JONS)	66	0.06	New	0	±0
Communist Party of the Castilian People (PCPC–PCPE)	59	0.05	New	0	±0
Spanish Democratic Party (PADE)	56	0.05	–0.05	0	±0
Authentic Phalanx (FA)	46	0.04	New	0	±0
National Democracy (DN)	31	0.03	New	0	±0
Republican Social Movement (MSR)	29	0.03	New	0	±0
Blank ballots	1,997	1.76	+0.04		
Total	113,582			3	±0
Valid votes	113,582	99.01	+0.13		
Invalid votes	1,130	0.99	–0.13		
Votes cast / turnout	114,712	79.86	+5.17		
Abstentions	28,929	20.14	–5.17		
Registered voters	143,641				

=== 2000 ===
Summary of the 12 March 2000 Congress of Deputies election results in Ávila
Parties and alliances	Popular vote			Seats	
Parties and alliances	Votes	%	±pp	Total	+/−
People's Party (PP)	70,058	65.31	+6.61	2	±0
Spanish Socialist Workers' Party–Progressives (PSOE–p)	28,596	26.66	–3.78	1	±0
United Left (IU)	5,117	4.77	–2.92	0	±0
Commoners' Land–Castilian Nationalist Party (TC–PNC)	372	0.35	+0.23	0	±0
Centrist Union–Democratic and Social Centre (UC–CDS)	327	0.30	–1.24	0	±0
Regionalist Unity of Castile and León (URCL)	262	0.24	+0.07	0	±0
Natural Law Party (PLN)	210	0.20	New	0	±0
The Phalanx (FE)	193	0.18	New	0	±0
Humanist Party (PH)	132	0.12	–0.01	0	±0
Spanish Democratic Party (PADE)	107	0.10	New	0	±0
Spain 2000 Platform (ES2000)	62	0.06	New	0	±0
Blank ballots	1,842	1.72	+0.72		
Total	107,278			3	±0
Valid votes	107,278	98.88	–0.43		
Invalid votes	1,213	1.12	+0.43		
Votes cast / turnout	108,491	74.69	–6.46		
Abstentions	36,759	25.31	+6.46		
Registered voters	145,250				

=== 1996 ===
Summary of the 3 March 1996 Congress of Deputies election results in Ávila
Parties and alliances	Popular vote			Seats	
Parties and alliances	Votes	%	±pp	Total	+/−
People's Party (PP)	68,503	58.70	+8.51	2	±0
Spanish Socialist Workers' Party (PSOE)	35,527	30.44	–0.03	1	±0
United Left of Castile and León (IUCL)	8,977	7.69	+2.24	0	±0
Centrist Union (UC)	1,793	1.54	–10.23	0	±0
Regionalist Unity of Castile and León (URCL)	196	0.17	+0.05	0	±0
Authentic Spanish Phalanx (FEA)	163	0.14	New	0	±0
Humanist Party (PH)	147	0.13	+0.10	0	±0
Commoners' Land–Castilian Nationalist Party (TC–PNC)	136	0.12	+0.03	0	±0
Workers' Revolutionary Party (PRT)	95	0.08	New	0	±0
Blank ballots	1,171	1.00	+0.22		
Total	116,708			3	±0
Valid votes	116,708	99.31	+0.21		
Invalid votes	805	0.69	–0.21		
Votes cast / turnout	117,513	81.15	+1.19		
Abstentions	27,298	18.85	–1.19		
Registered voters	144,811				

=== 1993 ===
Summary of the 6 June 1993 Congress of Deputies election results in Ávila
Parties and alliances	Popular vote			Seats	
Parties and alliances	Votes	%	±pp	Total	+/−
People's Party (PP)	57,324	50.19	+17.41	2	+1
Spanish Socialist Workers' Party (PSOE)	34,806	30.47	+2.71	1	±0
Democratic and Social Centre (CDS)	13,444	11.77	–19.77	0	–1
United Left of Castile and León (IU)	6,227	5.45	+0.48	0	±0
The Greens (LV)^{1}	654	0.57	–0.47	0	±0
The Ecologists (LE)	283	0.25	–0.20	0	±0
Ruiz-Mateos Group–European Democratic Alliance (ARM–ADE)	181	0.16	–0.47	0	±0
Regionalist Unity of Castile and León (URCL)	136	0.12	New	0	±0
Commoners' Land–Castilian Nationalist Party (TC–PNC)	103	0.09	New	0	±0
Natural Law Party (PLN)	51	0.04	New	0	±0
Coalition for a New Socialist Party (CNPS)^{2}	50	0.04	–0.06	0	±0
Party of El Bierzo (PB)	41	0.04	New	0	±0
Humanist Party (PH)	37	0.03	–0.03	0	±0
Communist Unification of Spain (UCE)	0	0.00	New	0	±0
Blank ballots	894	0.78	+0.16		
Total	114,213			3	±0
Valid votes	114,213	99.10	+0.84		
Invalid votes	1,035	0.90	–0.84		
Votes cast / turnout	115,248	79.96	+2.99		
Abstentions	28,879	20.04	–2.99		
Registered voters	144,127				
Sources
Footnotes: ^{1} The Greens results are compared to The Greens–Green List totals in the 1989 election.; ^{2} Coalition for a New Socialist Party results are compared to Alliance for the Republic totals in the 1989 election.

=== 1989 ===
Summary of the 29 October 1989 Congress of Deputies election results in Ávila
Parties and alliances	Popular vote			Seats	
Parties and alliances	Votes	%	±pp	Total	+/−
People's Party (PP)^{1}	35,757	32.78	+3.32	1	±0
Democratic and Social Centre (CDS)	34,402	31.54	–9.76	1	±0
Spanish Socialist Workers' Party (PSOE)	30,282	27.76	+3.20	1	±0
United Left (IU)	4,815	4.41	+2.40	0	±0
The Greens–Green List (LV–LV)	1,139	1.04	New	0	±0
Ruiz-Mateos Group (Ruiz-Mateos)	682	0.63	New	0	±0
The Ecologist Greens (LVE)	487	0.45	New	0	±0
Workers' Socialist Party (PST)	216	0.20	–0.19	0	±0
Workers' Party of Spain–Communist Unity (PTE–UC)^{2}	156	0.14	–0.37	0	±0
Spanish Phalanx of the CNSO (FE–JONS)	149	0.14	–0.06	0	±0
Communist Party of the Peoples of Spain (PCPE)	146	0.13	New	0	±0
Alliance for the Republic (AxR)^{3}	110	0.10	–0.06	0	±0
Humanist Party (PH)	70	0.06	New	0	±0
Blank ballots	676	0.62	+0.16		
Total	109,087			3	±0
Valid votes	109,087	98.26	+0.55		
Invalid votes	1,935	1.74	–0.55		
Votes cast / turnout	111,022	76.97	+0.25		
Abstentions	33,225	23.03	–0.25		
Registered voters	144,247				
Sources
Footnotes: ^{1} People's Party results are compared to People's Coalition totals in the 1986 election.; ^{2} Workers' Party of Spain–Communist Unity results are compared to Communists' Unity Board totals in the 1986 election.; ^{3} Alliance for the Republic results are compared to Internationalist Socialist Workers' Party totals in the 1986 election.

=== 1986 ===
Summary of the 22 June 1986 Congress of Deputies election results in Ávila
Parties and alliances	Popular vote			Seats	
Parties and alliances	Votes	%	±pp	Total	+/−
Democratic and Social Centre (CDS)	45,283	41.30	+18.90	1	±0
People's Coalition (AP–PDP–PL)^{1}	32,295	29.46	–3.86	1	±0
Spanish Socialist Workers' Party (PSOE)	26,927	24.56	–6.02	1	±0
United Left (IU)^{2}	2,202	2.01	+0.27	0	±0
Democratic Reformist Party (PRD)	572	0.52	New	0	±0
Communists' Unity Board (MUC)	558	0.51	New	0	±0
Workers' Socialist Party (PST)	432	0.39	–0.13	0	±0
Communist Unification of Spain (UCE)	284	0.26	+0.15	0	±0
Spanish Phalanx of the CNSO (FE–JONS)	222	0.20	New	0	±0
Republican Popular Unity (UPR)^{3}	187	0.17	–0.10	0	±0
Internationalist Socialist Workers' Party (POSI)	176	0.16	New	0	±0
Party of the Communists of Catalonia (PCC)	0	0.00	New	0	±0
Blank ballots	502	0.46	–0.04		
Total	109,640			3	±0
Valid votes	109,640	97.71	–0.20		
Invalid votes	2,566	2.29	+0.20		
Votes cast / turnout	112,206	76.72	–5.51		
Abstentions	34,040	23.28	+5.51		
Registered voters	146,246				
Sources
Footnotes: ^{1} People's Coalition results are compared to People's Alliance–People's Democratic Party totals in the 1982 election.; ^{2} United Left results are compared to Communist Party of Spain totals in the 1982 election.; ^{3} Republican Popular Unity results are compared to Communist Party of Spain (Marxist–Leninist) totals in the 1982 election.

=== 1982 ===
Summary of the 28 October 1982 Congress of Deputies election results in Ávila
Parties and alliances	Popular vote			Seats	
Parties and alliances	Votes	%	±pp	Total	+/−
People's Alliance–People's Democratic Party (AP–PDP)^{1}	37,193	33.32	+26.45	1	+1
Spanish Socialist Workers' Party (PSOE)	34,142	30.58	+10.60	1	+1
Democratic and Social Centre (CDS)	25,000	22.40	New	1	+1
Union of the Democratic Centre (UCD)	11,218	10.05	–55.76	0	–3
Communist Party of Spain (PCE)	1,947	1.74	–1.86	0	±0
Workers' Socialist Party (PST)	581	0.52	New	0	±0
New Force (FN)^{2}	414	0.37	–1.20	0	±0
Communist Party of Spain (Marxist–Leninist) (PCE (m–l))	300	0.27	New	0	±0
Communist Unity Candidacy (CUC)^{3}	153	0.14	–0.13	0	±0
Communist Unification of Spain (UCE)	127	0.11	New	0	±0
Revolutionary Communist League (LCR)	0	0.00	–0.12	0	±0
Communist League–Internationalist Socialist Workers' Coalition (LC (COSI))	0	0.00	New	0	±0
Communist Movement of Castile and León (MC–CL)	0	0.00	–0.42	0	±0
Blank ballots	557	0.50	+0.01		
Total	111,632			3	±0
Valid votes	111,632	97.91	–0.92		
Invalid votes	2,384	2.09	+0.92		
Votes cast / turnout	114,016	82.23	+11.77		
Abstentions	24,639	17.77	–11.77		
Registered voters	138,655				
Sources
Footnotes: ^{1} People's Alliance–People's Democratic Party results are compared to Democratic Coalition totals in the 1979 election.; ^{2} New Force results are compared to National Union totals in the 1979 election.; ^{3} Communist Unity Candidacy results are compared to Workers' Communist Party totals in the 1979 election.

=== 1979 ===
Summary of the 1 March 1979 Congress of Deputies election results in Ávila
Parties and alliances	Popular vote			Seats	
Parties and alliances	Votes	%	±pp	Total	+/−
Union of the Democratic Centre (UCD)	67,001	65.81	–2.34	3	±0
Spanish Socialist Workers' Party (PSOE)^{1}	20,341	19.98	+4.04	0	±0
Democratic Coalition (CD)^{2}	6,995	6.87	+0.09	0	±0
Communist Party of Spain (PCE)	3,661	3.60	+1.31	0	±0
National Union (UN)^{3}	1,599	1.57	+0.49	0	±0
Communist Movement–Organization of Communist Left (MC–OIC)	429	0.42	New	0	±0
Workers' Revolutionary Organization (ORT)^{4}	278	0.27	–0.08	0	±0
Workers' Communist Party (PCT)	271	0.27	New	0	±0
Party of Labour of Spain (PTE)	265	0.26	New	0	±0
Spanish Phalanx of the CNSO (Authentic) (FE–JONS(A))	232	0.23	New	0	±0
Revolutionary Communist League (LCR)	125	0.12	New	0	±0
Carlist Party (PC)	109	0.11	New	0	±0
Blank ballots	499	0.49	+0.26		
Total	101,805			3	±0
Valid votes	101,805	98.83	–0.26		
Invalid votes	1,202	1.17	+0.26		
Votes cast / turnout	103,007	70.46	–10.53		
Abstentions	43,176	29.54	+10.53		
Registered voters	146,183				
Sources
Footnotes: ^{1} Spanish Socialist Workers' Party results are compared to the combined totals of Spanish Socialist Workers' Party and People's Socialist Party–Socialist Unity in the 1977 election.; ^{2} Democratic Coalition results are compared to People's Alliance totals in the 1977 election.; ^{3} National Union results are compared to New Force totals in the 1977 election.; ^{4} Workers' Revolutionary Organization results are compared to Workers' Electoral Group totals in the 1977 election.

=== 1977 ===
Summary of the 15 June 1977 Congress of Deputies election results in Ávila
Parties and alliances	Popular vote			Seats	
Parties and alliances	Votes	%	±pp	Total	+/−
Union of the Democratic Centre (UCD)	71,650	68.15	n/a	3	n/a
Spanish Socialist Workers' Party (PSOE)	14,984	14.25	n/a	0	n/a
People's Alliance (AP)	7,123	6.78	n/a	0	n/a
Federation of Christian Democracy (FPD–ID)	4,872	4.63	n/a	0	n/a
Communist Party of Spain (PCE)	2,406	2.29	n/a	0	n/a
People's Socialist Party–Socialist Unity (PSP–US)	1,777	1.69	n/a	0	n/a
New Force (FN)	1,132	1.08	n/a	0	n/a
Socialist Movement (MS)	584	0.56	n/a	0	n/a
Workers' Electoral Group (AET)	366	0.35	n/a	0	n/a
Blank ballots	240	0.23	n/a		
Total	105,134			3	n/a
Valid votes	105,134	99.09	n/a		
Invalid votes	963	0.91	n/a		
Votes cast / turnout	106,097	80.99	n/a		
Abstentions	24,901	19.01	n/a		
Registered voters	130,998				

== Bibliography ==
- Ley 1/1977, de 4 de enero, para la Reforma Política (Fundamental Law 1/1977). Official State Gazette (in Spanish). 4 January 1977. BOE-A-1977-165.
- Real Decreto-ley 20/1977, de 18 de marzo, sobre Normas Electorales (Royal Decree-Law 20/1977). Official State Gazette (in Spanish). 18 March 1977. BOE-A-1977-7445.
- Constitución Española (Constitution). Official State Gazette (in Spanish). 27 December 1978. BOE-A-1978-31229.
- Ley Orgánica 5/1985, de 19 de junio, del Régimen Electoral General (Organic Law 5/1985). Official State Gazette (in Spanish). 19 June 1985. BOE-A-1985-11672.
- Carreras de Odriozola, Albert; Tafunell Sambola, Xavier (2005) [1989]. Estadísticas históricas de España, siglos XIX-XX (PDF) (in Spanish). Vol. 1 (II ed.). Bilbao: Fundación BBVA. pp. 1072–1097. ISBN 84-96515-00-1. Archived from the original (PDF) on 24 September 2015.
