= Spanish Communist Workers' Party (1973) =

Far-left political party in Spain

Spanish Communist Workers' Party Partido Comunista Obrero Español
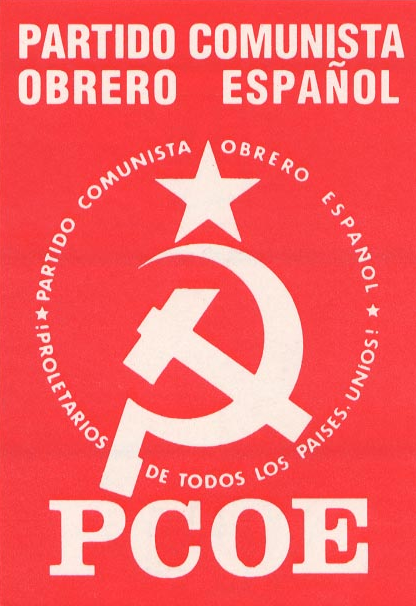
- General Secretary: Francisco Barjas
- Founder: Enrique Lister
- Founded: 1973
- Newspaper: Teoría Socialista and Análisis
- Youth wing: Communist Youth Federation of Spain (FJCE)
- Catalan wing: Communist Workers Party of Catalonia (PCOC)
- Ideology: Communism; Marxism–Leninism; Stalinism; Anti-revisionism; Anti-fascism; Republicanism
- Political position: Far-left
- Union wing: Asamblea de Comités, Delegados y Trabajadores

Party flag

Website
- www.pcoe.net

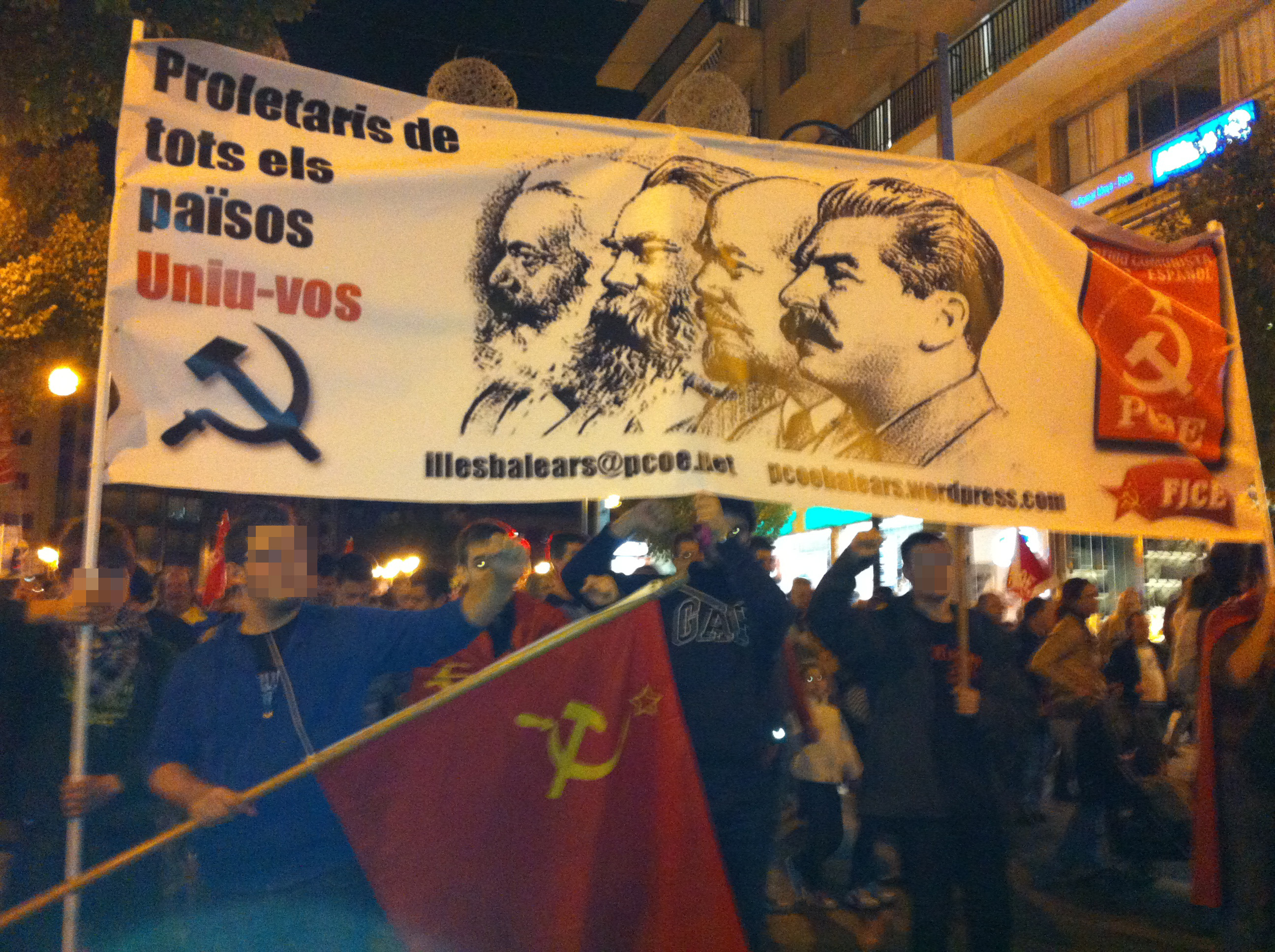
PCOE-FJCE banner in a demonstration at Palma de Mallorca in the 14 of November general strike in Spain.

The Spanish Communist Workers' Party (Spanish: Partido Comunista Obrero Español, PCOE) is an anti-revisionist Marxist–Leninist communist party in Spain. It was founded in 1973, when Enrique Líster (a Republican general in the Spanish Civil War) revolted against the Eurocommunist line of Communist Party of Spain (PCE) general secretary Santiago Carrillo. The party published Análisis.

== History ==
A catalyst for the split was the condemnation by the PCE of the Soviet intervention in Czechoslovakia in 1968. PCOE was legalized in 1977, during the Spanish transition to democracy. Its sister organisation in Catalonia was the Partit Comunista Obrer de Catalunya. PCOE had a youth organization called the Communist Youth Federation of Spain (Federación de Jóvenes Comunistas de España).

In the 1983 regional elections in the Valencian Community, PCOE obtained 6,416 votes (0.34%). It had an electoral pact with Partido Comunista de España Unificado ahead of the regional elections in Madrid of the same year. When PCEU and other groups unified themselves as the Communist Party of the Peoples of Spain, PCOE chose not to participate in the merger.

=== Reintegration in the PCE and split ===
In 1985, the majority faction, led by Enrique Lister, decided to dissolve the party and rejoin the PCE, in a congress where the 10,000 members of the PCOE were represented. The majority of the members followed Lister and rejoined the PCE; however, a minority faction decided that they weren't going to join the PCE and kept the party alive, although severely weakened. Today, the party publishes Teoría Socialista and Análisis.

The continued PCOE contested the 2015 Spanish elections, fielding candidates in two constituencies (Córdoba and Sevilla), and gaining 1,906 votes in total, and also competed in the 2016 Spanish general election, again only fielding candidates in Córdoba and Sevilla. In 2018, the party contested the Andalusian regional election, competing in the constituencies of Córdoba (975 votes, 0.26%) and Sevilla (2,230 votes, 0.25%).

At the April 2019 Spanish election, the PCOE improved its election results compared to 2016. The party contested eight constituencies and gained 9,094 votes.

In 2021, the PCOE formed the Coalition for Communist Unity with the PCPE in the Madrid regional election.

== Electoral performance ==
Congreso de los Diputados
Election	Votes	%	Seats
1982	25,830	0.12%	0 / 350
2015	1,909	0.01%	0 / 350
2016	1,822	0.01%	0 / 350
April 2019	9,094	0.03%	0 / 350
November 2019	9,664	0.04%	0 / 350

Autonomous communities
Election	Community	Votes	%	Seats	Notes
1980	Catalonia	12,963	0.48%	0 / 135	
1982	Andalusia	7,891	0.28%	0 / 109	
1983	Balearic Islands	1,509	0.49%	0 / 54	
1983	Castile and León	1,974	0.14%	0 / 84	In a coalition with the Unified Communist Party of Spain
1983	Castilla-La Mancha	579	0.06%	0 / 44	In a coalition with the Unified Communist Party of Spain
1983	Extremadura	1,463	0.26%	0 / 65	In a coalition with the Unified Communist Party of Spain
1983	Madrid	4,473	0.19%	0 / 94	
1983	Valencia	5,945	0.31%	0 / 89	
1984	Catalonia	2,593	0.09%	0 / 135	
2018	Andalusia	3,205	0.09%	0 / 109	
2021	Madrid	878	0.02%	0 / 136	As part of the Coalition for Communist Unity together with the PCPE

== See also ==
- List of anti-revisionist groups
