= Movement for the Recovery of the PCE =

Movement for the Recovery of the PCE Movimiento para la Recuperación del PCE
- Chairman: Manuel Martínez Llaneza
- Founded: 1982
- Dissolved: 1984
- Split from: Communist Party of Spain
- Merged into: Communist Party of the Peoples of Spain
- Ideology: Marxism-Leninism; Pro-Soviet Union
- Political position: Far-left

Movement for the Recovery of the PCE (in Spanish: Movimiento para la Recuperación del PCE, MR-PCE) was a political party in Spain. Formed in 1982 by ex-members of the Communist Party of Spain and Comisiones Obreras that wanted a more pro-soviet and orthodox leninist political line.

In 1984 MR-PCE created the Communist Party of the Peoples of Spain, with Unified Communist Party of Spain and other smaller pro-soviet parties.
