= Communist Party of Spain (8th and 9th Congresses) =

Communist Party of Spain (8th and 9th Congresses) Partido Comunista de España (VIII y IX Congresos)
- Abbreviation: PCE (VIII-IX)
- Founded: 1971
- Dissolved: 1980
- Split from: Communist Party of Spain
- Merged into: PCEU
- Headquarters: Madrid
- Ideology: Communism; Marxism-Leninism; Pro-Soviet Union
- Political position: Left-wing

PCE (VIII-IX) sticker honouring Agustín Gómez

The Communist Party of Spain (8th and 9th Congresses) (in Spanish: Partido Comunista de España (VIII y IX Congresos)) was a pro-Soviet splinter group of Communist Party of Spain (PCE).

PCE (VIII-IX) was one of many groups that broke away from PCE during the period when Santiago Carrillo held the post of PCE general secretary and directed the party towards Eurocommunism; it was founded in 1971. A prominent leader of the new party was Agustín Gómez. It published a magazine called Mundo Obrero (same name as the publication of PCE).

In 1980 PCE (VIII-IX) fused with Workers' Communist Party to form the Unified Communist Party of Spain. PCEU was later instrumental in creating the Communist Party of the Peoples of Spain in 1982.
