= Communist Youth Federation of Spain =

Communist Youth Federation of Spain (in Spanish: Federación de Jóvenes Comunistas de España) was the youth wing of the Spanish Communist Workers' Party (PCOE). FJCE published Lucha Juvenil.

In 1982 FJCE published Enríque Lister 1907–1982, 75 años, una historia, una lucha (Madrid, 1982), as a biography of the PCOE leader Enrique Líster.

This youth wing of PCOE was refounded in 2011, after the 14th Congress of PCOE in Seville.
