= Workers' Communist Party (Spain) =

- Abbreviation: PCT
- Chairman: Carlos Tuya
- Founded: 1973
- Dissolved: 1980
- Split from: Communist Party of Spain
- Merged into: PCEU
- Newspaper: La Voz Comunista
- Youth wing: Workers' Communist Youth
- Ideology: Communism; Marxism-Leninism; Pro-Soviet Union

The Workers' Communist Party (Spanish: Partido Comunista de los Trabajadores, PCT) was a communist party in Spain. It was formed in 1977 and emerged from the Left Opposition of the Communist Party of Spain.

The PCT had a youth wing called the Workers' Communist Youth (Juventudes Comunistas de los Trabajadores). In December 1977 it initiated the publication Manifiesto. Soon Manifiesto was substituted by Bandera Comunista, which was published in 1978.

In 1980, the PCT merged with the Communist Party of Spain (8th and 9th Congresses) to form the Unified Communist Party of Spain (PCEU).
