= Unified Communist Party of Spain =

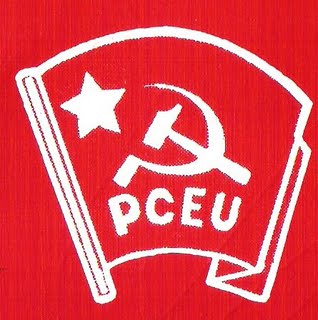
- Abbreviation: PCEU
- Chairman: Carlos Tuya
- Founded: 1980
- Dissolved: 1984
- Merger of: PCE (VII-IX); PCT
- Merged into: Communist Party
- Headquarters: C/ Carranza, 8, 5' izq., Madrid
- Ideology: Communism; Marxism-Leninism; Pro-Soviet Union

The Unified Communist Party of Spain (Spanish: Partido Communista Unificado de España, abbreviated PCEU) was a political party in Spain. PCEU was a pro-Soviet rival to the Eurocommunist Communist Party of Spain (PCE).

PCEU was founded at an 'extraordinary congress of unification' in Madrid in May 1980, merging the Communist Party of Spain (8th and 9th Congresses) (PCE (VIII-IX)) and the Workers' Communist Party (PCT). News of the merger were carried by Czechoslovak and East German press. In June 1980 an extraordinary party conference was held in Alicante to ratify the merger. In the trade union movement PCEU supported Comisiones Obreras. The youth wing of PCEU was called Unified Communist Youth of Spain (Juventud Comunista de España Unificada, JCEU).

The PCEU congress held in Bilbao in March 1981 was considered illegitimate by one sector of the party, leading to a split of the party into two. One group was led by Carlos Delgado. The other group was led by Fèlix Valero and Carlos Tuya. Both groups published identically named organs titled Mundo Obrero y Comunista and La Voz Comunista. Both factions had youth wings named JCEU. The Delgado group took part in the 1984 Unity Coordination of Communists, that included the Movement to Recover the Communist Party of Spain (MRPCE), the Communist Collectives and the Party of Communists of Catalonia. The Valero/Tuya group continued to exist until 1984. Tuya served as party president.
