= Communist Party of the Peoples of Spain =

Political party in Spain

Communist Party of the Peoples of Spain Partido Comunista de los Pueblos de España
- General Secretary: Julio Díaz
- Founded: 15 December 1984
- Merger of: Unified Communist Party of Spain; Movement for the Recovery of the PCE
- Headquarters: Madrid
- Youth wing: Communist Youth of the Peoples of Spain; Collectives of Communist Youth (until 2017)
- Ideology: Communism; Marxism–Leninism; Hard Euroscepticism; Internationalism; Anti-capitalism
- Political position: Far-left
- National affiliation: United Left (1986–1988)
- European affiliation: INITIATIVE (formerly)
- International affiliation: IMCWP; World Anti-Imperialist Platform
- Colours: Red
- Local Government: 4 / 67,121
- European Parliament: 0 / 61

Website
- pcpe.es

Communist Party of the Peoples of Spain (Spanish: Partido Comunista de los Pueblos de España; PCPE) is a Marxist–Leninist party in Spain. PCPE was founded out of the unification of several Marxist–Leninist factions. The youth organization is called the Communist Youth of the Peoples of Spain.

== History ==
From 13–15 December 1984, a "Communist Unity Congress" was held in Madrid. Partido Comunista de España Unificado (PCEU, Unified Communist Party of Spain), Movimiento de Recuperación del PCE (MRPCE, Movement for the Recuperation of the PCE), Movimiento para la Recuperación y Unificación del PCE (MRUPCE, Movement for the Recuperation and Unification of the PCE), Candidatura Comunista (CC, Communist Candidature), and some minor groups unified themselves, thus creating Partido Comunista (renamed PCPE in 1986).

All these groups had surged from splits from the Communist Party of Spain (PCE) during the 1970s and 1980s. Quickly after its foundation, PCPE was recognized by some other parties, such as the Communist Party of the Soviet Union and other state-bearing Eastern bloc parties. The party was formed by those who were against Santiago Carrillo's Eurocommunist line in the PCE. The Catalan referent of PCPE was initially Party of Communists of Catalonia (PCC), but it later broke with PCPE and now the Catalan referent is the Communist Party of the Peoples of Catalonia.

PCPE briefly joined Izquierda Unida in 1987. In 2000, the Spanish Communist Workers' Party (PCOE) merged with PCPE, and the publication of the united party became Unidad y Lucha.

In 2021, the PCPE formed a coalition with the reconstituted Spanish Communist Workers' Party (PCOE) for the Madrid regional election as the Coalition for Communist Unity.

In 2023, the party decided, for first time since 1989, to not contest the election independently. The PCPE is calling for a null vote, calling the election an "imperative need of the bourgeois state to urgently rebuild the power bloc that guarantees the necessary institutional stability, for the management of the oligarchic interests represented by the Ibex35, the EU and European Central Bank, in the context of the general crisis of capitalism". However the party is contesting the two Canary Island constituencies in a coalition with Ahora Canarias.

== 2017 split ==
In April 2017 the PCPE suffered a major split. During the fifth plenary session of the central committee a minority of the committee recognized Ástor García as the new secretary general of the party, however a majority continued to recognize the incumbent (since 2002) secretary general Carmelo Suárez. The group around Ástor García created a new competing website of the PCPE.

Both PCPE-Suárez and PCPE-García were recognized by different communist parties as the legitimate PCPE. A majority of the Collectives of Communist Youth membership pledged allegiance to PCPE-García.

For the next two years both groups would compete for the PCPE name and international recognition. This dispute was finally resolved in March 2019 when the PCPE-García relinquished its claim to the PCPE name and renamed itself to the Communist Party of the Workers of Spain (Partido Comunista de los Trabajadores de España, PCTE).

== Publications ==
PCPE publishes Unidad y Lucha and Propuesta Comunista (a theoretical journal). Before the PCOE-PCPE merger, the main publication of the party was Nuevo Rumbo.

== Electoral performance ==
=== Cortes Generales ===
Election	Leader	Votes	%	#	Seats		Outcome	Notes
Election	Leader	Votes	%	#	Congress	Senate	Outcome	Notes
1986	Ignacio Gallego	935,504	4.63	#5	1 / 350	0 / 208	PSOE majority	Within United Left
1989	Juan Ramos Camarero	62,664	0.31	#20	0 / 350	0 / 208	PSOE minority	
1993	Juan Ramos Camarero	10,233	0.04	#31	0 / 350	0 / 208	PSOE minority	
1996	Juan Ramos Camarero	14,513	0.06	#21	0 / 350	0 / 208	PP minority	
2000	Juan Ramos Camarero	12,898	0.06	#29	0 / 350	0 / 208	PP majority	
2004	Carmelo Suárez	12,979	0.05	#29	0 / 350	0 / 208	PSOE minority	
2008	Carmelo Suárez	20,030	0.08	#26	0 / 350	0 / 208	PSOE minority	
2011	Carmelo Suárez	26,254	0.11	#21	0 / 350	0 / 208	PP majority	
2015	Carmelo Suárez	31,179	0.12	#18	0 / 350	0 / 208	New election	
2016	Carmelo Suárez	26,627	0.11	#15	0 / 350	0 / 208	PP minority	
April 2019	Carmelo Suárez	17,101	0.07	#24	0 / 350	0 / 208	New election	
November 2019	Carmelo Suárez	14,023	0.06	#26	0 / 350	0 / 208	PSOE and Podemos minority	
2023	Carmelo Suárez	1,640	0.01	#36	0 / 350	0 / 208	PSOE and Sumar minority	in a coalition with Ahora Canarias

== Gallery ==
NR sticker of 1988

PCPE sticker of 1999

== See also ==
- List of political parties in Spain
