= Lorenzo Sáenz y Fernández Cortina =

Spanish politician and publisher

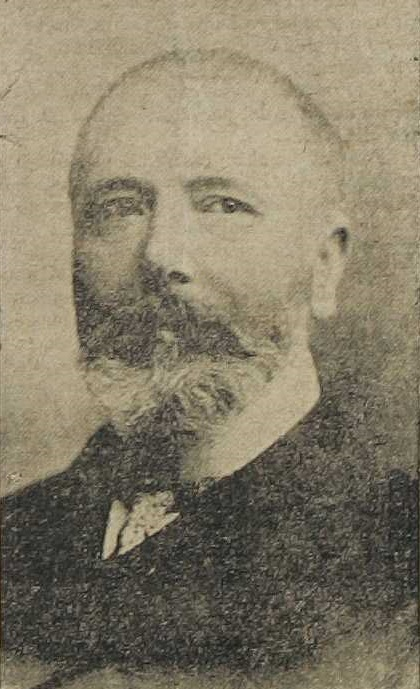
- Born: Lorenzo Sáenz y Fernández Cortina; 1863; Jaén, Spain
- Died: 1939 (aged 75–76); Jaén, Spain
- Occupations: lawyer, entrepreneur
- Known for: politician, publisher
- Political party: Carlism

Lorenzo Sáenz y Fernández Cortina (1863–1939) was a Spanish politician and publisher. Politically he supported the Carlist cause, though in the mid-1930s he assumed a somewhat dissident stand and co-led a faction known as Cruzadistas. His career climaxed in 1908–1910, when he served in the lower chamber of the Cortes. Within the party ranks during two spells of 1912-1913 and 1929-1932 he served in the national executive Junta Nacional, and in 1929-1932 he held the regional jefatura in New Castile. As a publisher in the 1890s and 1900s he founded and animated minor titles issued in eastern Andalusia, but is better known as one of key figures behind Madrid-based Carlist periodicals, El Correo Español (1919–1921) and El Cruzado Español (1929–1936). As an entrepreneur he was engaged in banking, olive oil, hydroelectricity and mining businesses.

== Family and youth ==
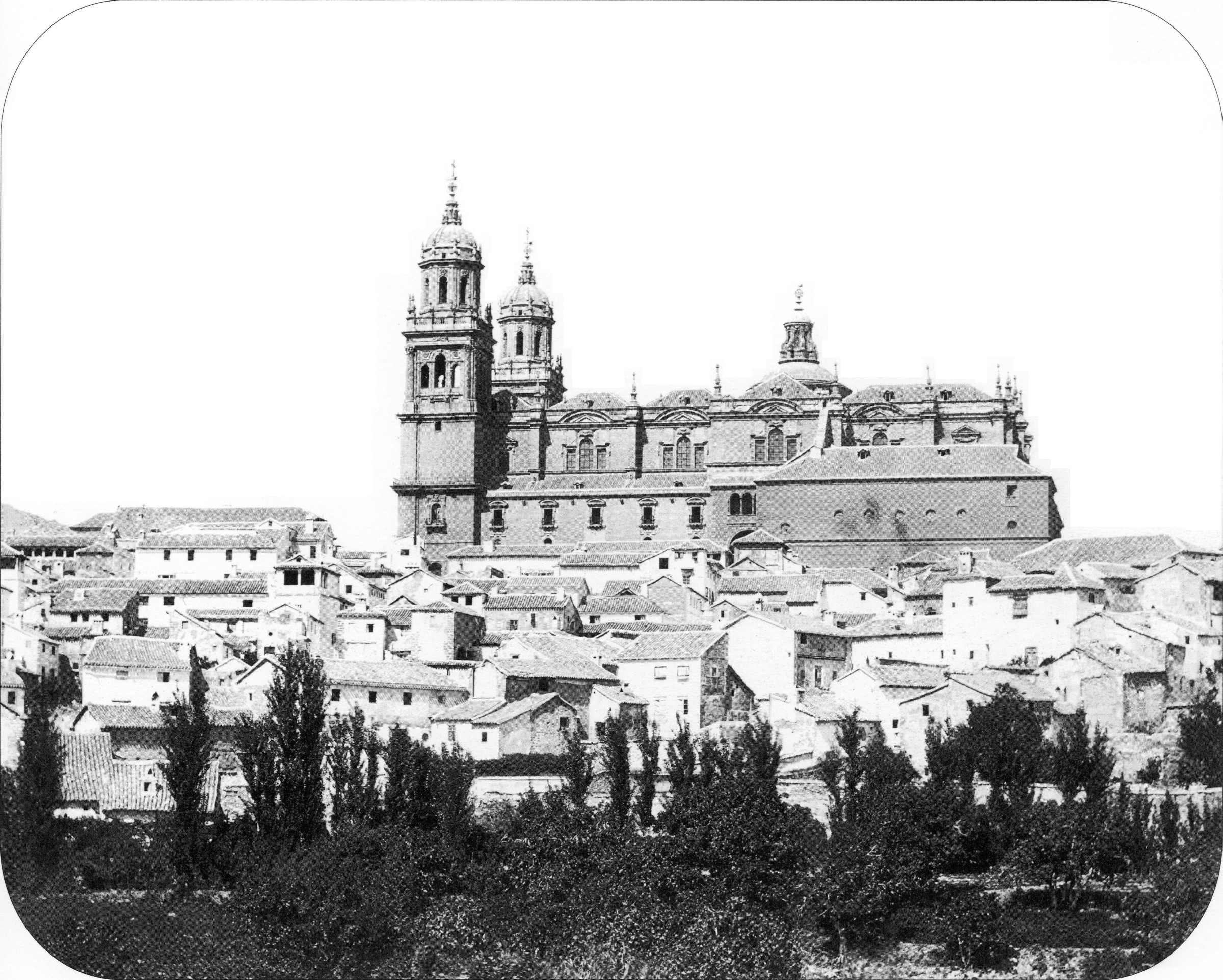
Jaén, 1860s

Sáenz's paternal ancestors were related to Rioja. His grandfather, Manuel Sáenz García (b. 1799), originated from Ortigosa de Cameros and belonged to petty nobility; he married Celestina García Rubio, a girl from the nearby Rasillo de Cameros, whose brother León in the 1820s would open one of the first banks in Jaén. The son of Manuel and Celestina, also Manuel Sáenz García (1828–1904), though born in Ortigosa at one point moved to Jaén and joined the family-related banking business, which since the mid-19th century became a very successful enterprise; he got known as a banquero. Around 1863 he married Joaquína Fernández y Fernández Cortina (died 1914). Her ancestors originated from Pendueles (Llanes, Asturias) and her maternal uncles were Joaquín and Lorenzo Fernandez Cortina, the former the bishop of Sigüenza and the latter the canónigo in Jaén. Though born in Asturias she moved to Jaén, where her brother Manuel Férnandez Cortina became the co-founder of Colegio de Abogados and one of the most prestigious citizens of Jaén.

Manuel and Joaquína settled in Jaén and formed part of the local financial oligarchy. It is not known how many children they had, though Lorenzo had at least 3 brothers, Joaquín, Juan and Manuel; it is not clear who was the oldest one, yet Lorenzo outlived all of them. None of the sources consulted provides any information on his early education, though some suggest that he frequented schools in Rioja, perhaps in Logroño. In 1878 he entered Facultad de Derecho at Universidad Central in Madrid. One source maintains that in 1884 he became Doctor en Civil y Canónico thanks to the thesis Reglas equitativas para tratar la línea divisoria entre ambas potestades, o sea, entre los derechos e intereses de la Iglesia y el Estado. Another author claims that in 1883 he became licenciado en derecho, while in 1885 he majored in civil and canon law; one more source notes that his dissertation was accepted as sobresaliente. In 1888 Sáenz entered Colegio de Abogados de Jaén, yet it is not known whether he commenced own practice.

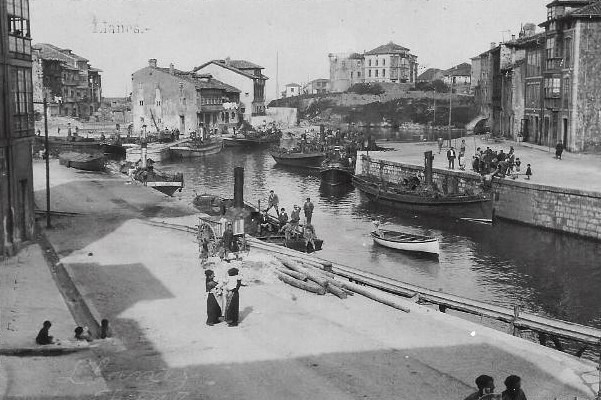
Llanes, early 20th c.

In 1893 Sáenz married Antonia Dosal Sobrino (1872–1933); since she was from Llanes, Lorenzo probably came to know her due to his maternal family links. Her mother was sister to very successful indianos, who thanks to textile business made a fortune in Mexico but who died with no descendancy. The wealth was first inherited by Antonia's brother Sinforiano, but following his childless death part of it eventually passed to her; its crown was the estate in Llanes, known as La Concepción or Palacio Sinforiano. Lorenzo and Antonia lived mostly in Madrid, where he joined the local Colegio de Abogados. They owned a luxurious apartment next to the Cortes building, yet they used to spend long spells in Llanes and Jaén, where he co-owned the family economy. They had no children. Among more distant relatives, Lorenzo's sister-in-law became condesa de Mendoza Cortina, while his brother (who prior to 1905 served as alcalde of Jaén) married condesa de Humanes.

== First publishing projects (1890s) ==
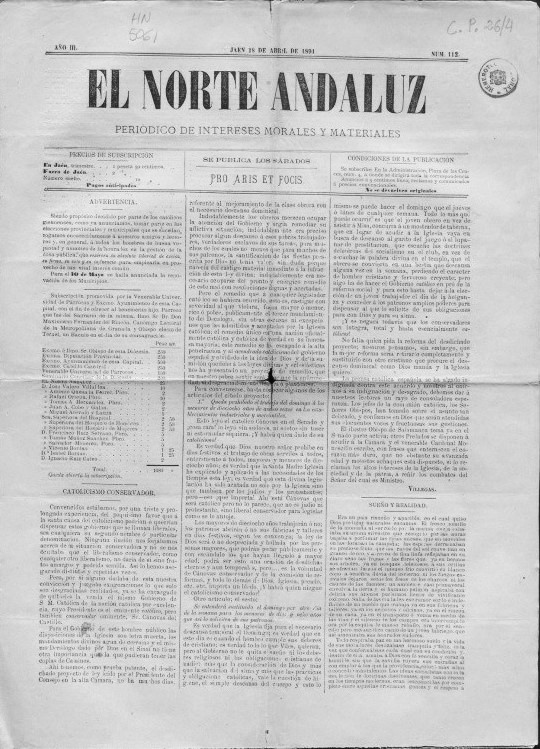
El Norte Andaluz

Sáenz inherited political outlook from his father, who was an active Carlist and in the 1890s formed part of the local party executive, Junta Provincial de Jaén. Lorenzo was not noted in Carlist structures before in 1889 he launched a local Jaén-based weekly, El Norte Andaluz. It was not openly Traditionalist (last Traditionalist title disappeared in Jaén in 1877), posed as Catholic periodical, sub-titled "periodico de intereses morales y materiales", and by scholars is described as "cercano al carlismo". Co-edited with Bartolomé Romero Gago, the future Seville cathedral canon, it was barely more than a 4-page bulletin, dedicated mostly to religious issues. The last issue appeared in 1891. According to friendly newspapers, the closing of El Norte resulted from " una conspiración íntegro-conservadora". This conspiracy was principally about later launch of the local Integrist bi-weekly, El Pueblo Católico; since then, hostility towards the Integrists would mark Sáenz's activity for some 45 years to come. Scholars summarize the episode by noting that "la importancia objetiva de El Norte Andaluz es escasa".

In the early and mid-1890s Sáenz emerged as major figure in local lay Catholic circles. He served as "corresponsal de esta Diócesis" and later as secretario of Junta Diocesana, entrusted e.g. with collecting money for various projects; as the representative of Jaén he attended Congreso Católico in Zaragoza, and remained engaged in other local activities. He gained status also in Carlist structures. In 1895 he was first noted as member of Junta Provincial de Jaén and as such kept signing various declarations, e.g. in 1896. In 1897 he was elected presidente honorario of the local Jaén círculo and in 1898 served as president of another local organization. In the mid-1890s he was also admitted as member-correspondent to Real Academia de la Historia (unclear on what basis) and friendly titles referred to him as "joven abogado é ilustrado periodista".

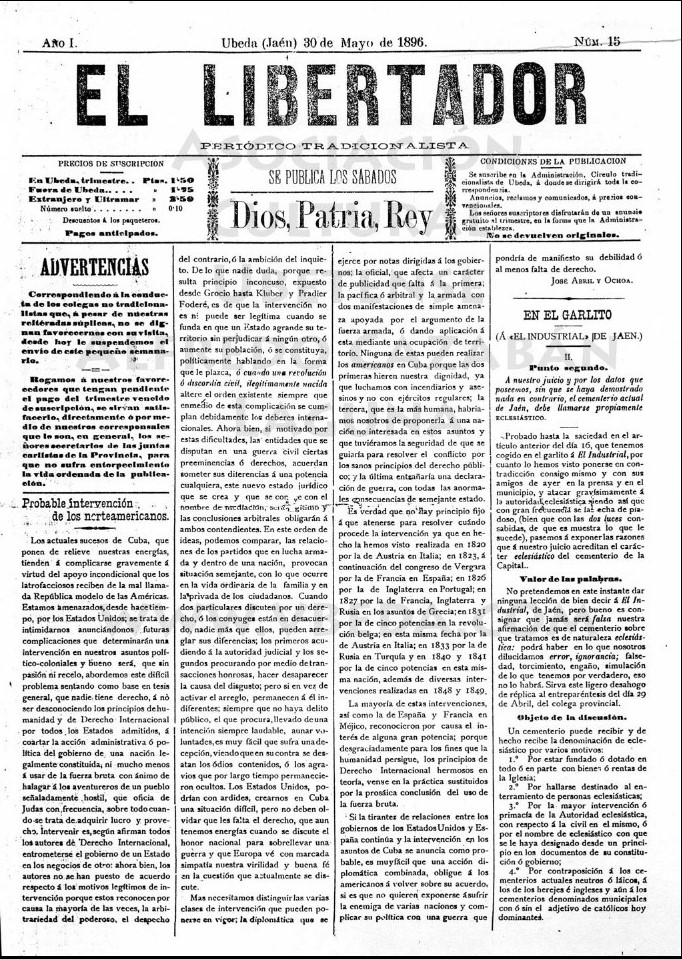
El Libertador

Though since the mid-1890s Sáenz shuttled between Jaén and Madrid, where he established his primary residence, in 1896 he launched another Andalusian publishing project, the weekly El Libertador; this time it was based in Ubeda. Clearly identified as Traditionalist and with "Dios, Patria, Rey" as sub-title, it was issued on Saturdays. The weekly was managed mostly by Fernando del Moral Almagro and like El Norte Andaluz it was also a simple, 4-page print on 4-columns; the content was somewhat more diverse, with religious issues discussed along national or local news and a cultural column present. The weekly pledged Catholic orthodoxy, yet its ultra-intransigent stand at one point produced controversy: Victoriano Guisasola Menéndez, the future primate of Spain and at the time the bishop of Jaén, lambasted the paper for re-publishing of an article titled Obispos liberales, Obispos arrianos, aimed against allegedly liberal hierarchs. In 1899 El Libertador was moved to Jaén, where it first continued as a bi-weekly and then closed in 1900.

== Jaén, Madrid, and Llanes (turn of centuries) ==
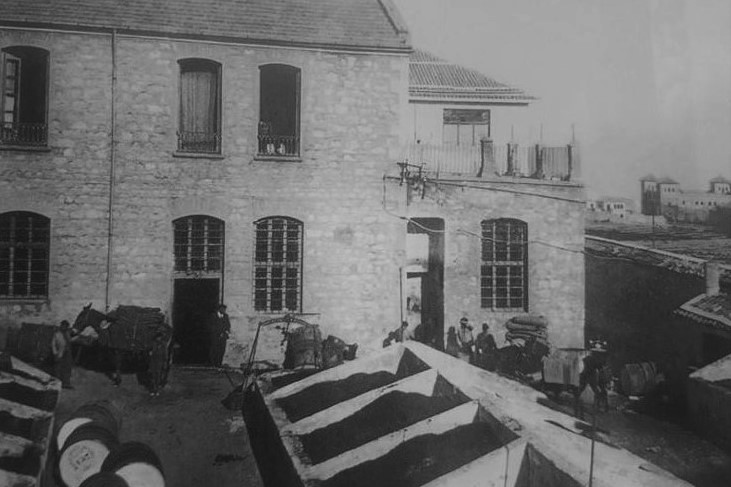
Sáenz olive oil factory, Jaén

Since his 1893 marriage Sáenz entered Carlist structures in Asturias, where he became honorary president of Junta Tradicionalista in Llanes, the municipio of his mother and his wife. Since removal to Madrid he was also increasingly engaged in the party organization in the capital. In 1896 the local círculo tradicionalista elected him to its Junta Directiva, where he assumed the post of secretario general as well; this was to last for some years to come. In Traditionalist party press he was listed among prominent figures when taking part in local events, e.g. in the funeral of marquesa de Cerralbo, wife to the Carlist national leader. However, in official structures of the Carlist organization, at the time named Comunión Católico-Monárquica, he double-hatted; apart from duties in Madrid he remained also member of the Jaén executive, until the early 1900s headed by Eusebio Sanchez Perez.

In the early 1900s Sáenz was engaged in a number of professional activities. He was a lawyer in Madrid, at times referred to as "conocido jurisconsulto". In his native Jaén, apart from shares in the family banking business, together with brothers he owned a large plant, producing olive oil, and an Eléctrica de San Rafael hydro-power installation on the Guadalquivir. In Asturias he was co-gerente and administrador of Hidroeléctrica Purón, a company based in Llanes and operating small power stations on Purón and Barbalin streams. Around 1905 he engaged also in mining industry; he applied for license for exploring iron ore near Llanes, in the pit known as "La Especial" and located at estates owned with his wife, also on the banks of Purón. It seems he indeed tried exploration for some time, yet after 1910 there is no information on any further activity.

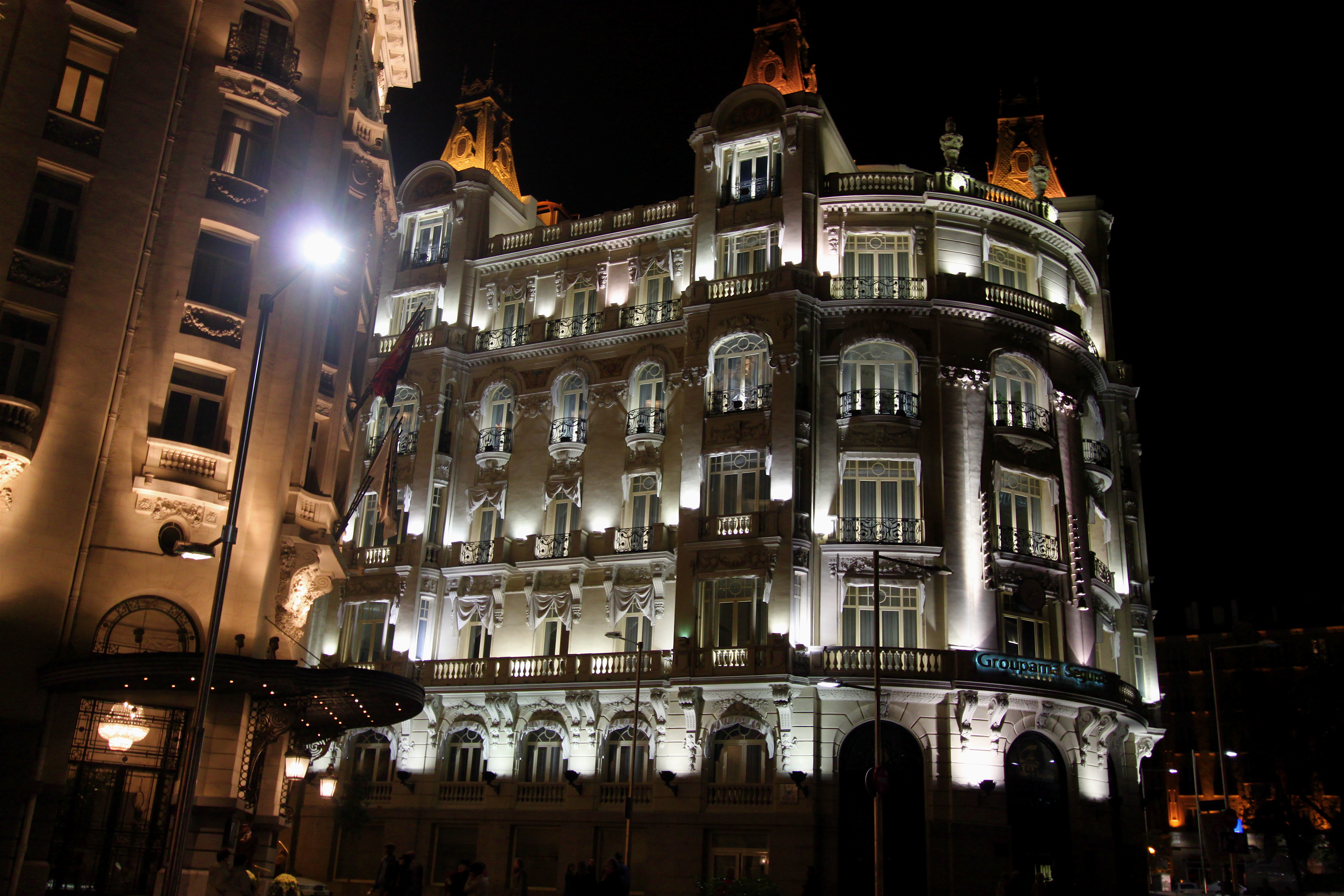
Edificio Plus Ultra, Sáenz's residence in Madrid

In 1901 Sáenz one more time tried his hand in the publishing business. Described in historiography as "infatigable creador de órganos de esta significación política [Carlism]", in Úbeda he launched a bi-weekly El Combate. It was managed mostly by an experienced local editor, Rufino Peinado Peinado, who since 1905 formally acted as its director. El Combate assumed an openly Carlist stand and is referred to as "el más duradero de los tres periódicos que anima y financia"; it was counted among periodicals "oficialmente carlistas". After few years and because of limited success, it was re-formatted as a weekly; periodically it published also a doctrinal companion, Hoja quincenal de El Combate. The weekly proved the longest-lasting of Sáenz's Andalusian publishing projects; it kept appearing until 1911. At the time Sáenz emerged also as the leader of provincial Carlism in Jaén; in 1905 he replaced Eusebio Sanchez Perez as presidente efectivo of Junta Provincial Tradicionalista. Local branches across the province nominated him presidente honorario, e.g. in Alcalá la Real or in Villacarrillo.

== In and around Cortes (1910s) ==
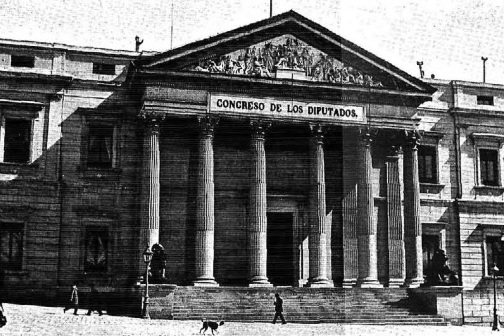
Cortes, 1910s

In 1908 the Carlist deputy to the Cortes from Navarre, Eduardo Castillo de Pineyro, died; in such case the electoral regime required by-elections to nominate his replacement. The Carlist executive appointed Sáenz to stand; he had no links to Navarre, yet as by-election was to take place in the district of Tudela, in the Ribera Navarra region on the left bank of the Ebro, he was marketed as the one who "tiene cerca del distrito la circunstancia grata de ser oriundo de la noble tierra que baña el Ebro, donde ha hecho sus estudios", a reference to his links to La Rioja, on the other side of the river. There was limited interest among the electors, as only 3.622 of 11.028 bothered to vote, yet 99% preferred Sáenz over his liberal and government-supported counter-candidate, Mariano Aisa y Cabrerizo, barón de la Torre. His mandate lasted barely 2 years before the parliament term expired in 1910; during this time he was reported in the press as co-fathering an amendment to law on railways, delivering a speech on budgetary contribution to refurbishment of churches and on operations of the post office.

In the late 1900s Sáenz as a Cortes deputy featured in numerous Carlist propaganda events, e.g. in 1908 Santander or in 1909 in Palencia; in 1909 he attended the funeral of the claimant in Trieste. In the 1910 electoral campaign he tried to renew his ticket, also from Tudela, formally running on the Coalicion Católica list. Following very fierce competition initially he was declared triumphant over his liberal counter-candidate Salvador Guardiola, but the latter protested numerous irregularities; they ranged from women bullying their husbands to plain corruption. Though initially Tribunal Supremo confirmed that Sáenz got 4.902 votes and Guardiola 4.742 votes, eventually the new Cortes declared Sáenz's mandate void.

Carlist standard

During the following campaign of 1914 Sáenz once again appeared as the Carlist candidate in Tudela; he was among 20 candidates of the party nationwide and among 3 party candidates in Navarre. However, at the time the Carlist grip on the region, evident mostly in the early 1900s, was already less firm, due to the pursued strategy of pivotal alliances and the resulting bewilderment of the electorate. This time he faced the conservative datista counter-candidate, José M. Méndez Vigo, marquez de Montalvo. Out of 9.357 votes cast, Sáenz got 47% compared to 52% of his rival; this time it was Sáenz who protested irregularities, but to no avail. In the following elections of 1916 Sáenz did not stand; the Carlist candidate from Tudela was Luis Martínez Kleiser (from Asturias), who anyway lost to Méndez Vigo. During the 1919 campaign Sáenz did not compete, but acted as "delegado electoral", the chief party representative acting in front of electoral authorities.

== In and around Junta Nacional (1910s) ==
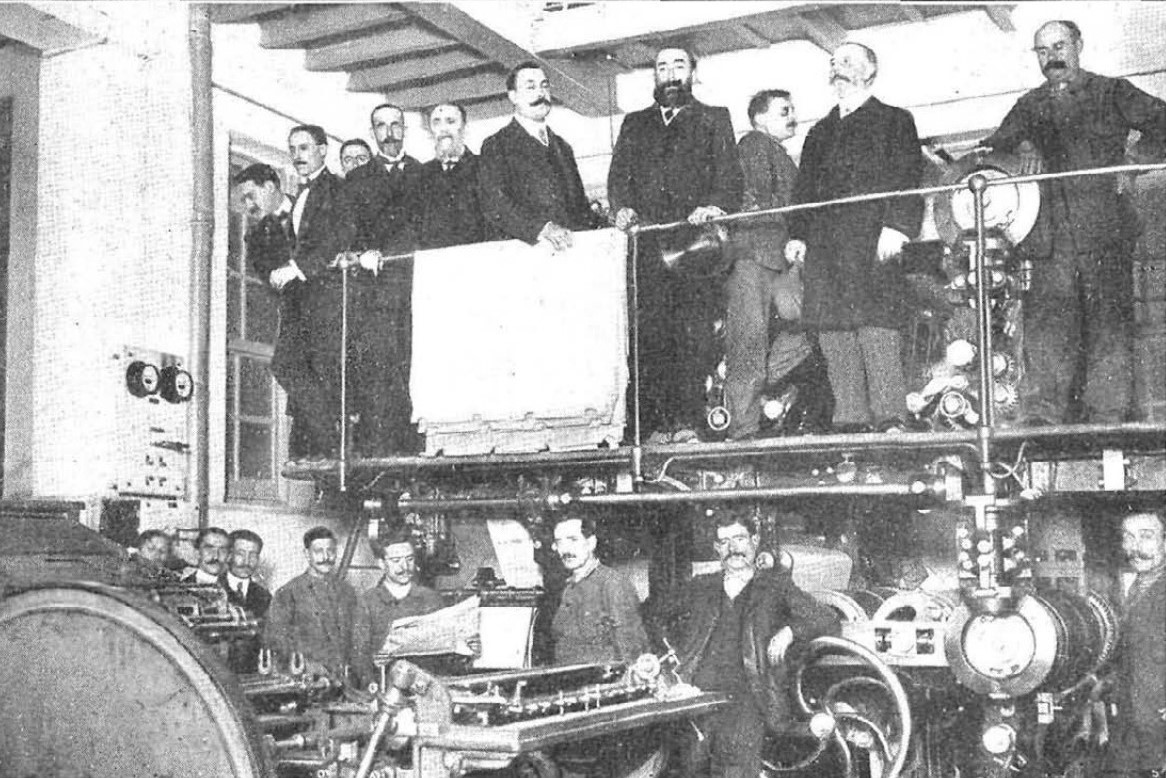
Sáenz during opening of Casa de los Tradicionalistas, 1912

Since 1905 Jefe Provincial in Jaén, Sáenz kept rising also within central Carlist structures. Some time prior to 1909 he was nominated "Secretario de la Jefatura delegada de la Comunión Católico-Monárquica". Since the turn of the decades he became increasingly active as to party finances, first launching and then animating subscriptions for Casa de los Tradicionalistas in Madrid, the building supposed to be sort of a Traditionalist cultural centre in the capital; it was also to host editorial and printing facilities of El Correo Español, the unofficial party mouthpiece. Following reorganization of central executive, in 1911 he was nominated - together with Celestino Alcocer - Tesorero de la Tradición. He was busy on fund-raising tours across the country, though probably the lion's share of the capital collected came thanks to one single donation. The project was crowned with success in 1912, when during a pompous ceremony and with him speaking the imposing Casa de los Tradicionalistas opened at Calle de Pizarro 14; the most important part of the site was modern printing machinery of El Correo.

In 1912 Sáenz was officially nominated to the national executive, Junta Nacional; though the body was composed of regional leaders and his native Andalusia was represented by its Jefe Regional José Diez de la Cortina, Sáenz was appointed on additional basis. Following yet another reshuffle in 1913 he entered the section of Industria y Comercio of new junta general extraordinaria and Junta Directiva of Casa de los Tradicionalistas. The same year Junta Nacional set up 10 specialized commissions; together with marqués de Vesolla and conde Rodezno he was nominated to the one named Tesoro de la Tradición. However, Sáenz declined the nomination. None of the sources consulted provides clarification, and in particular it is not clear whether his decision was conditioned by growing internal division within Carlism, increasingly divided between followers of the key theorist Juan Vázquez de Mella and these supporting the king, Don Jaime.

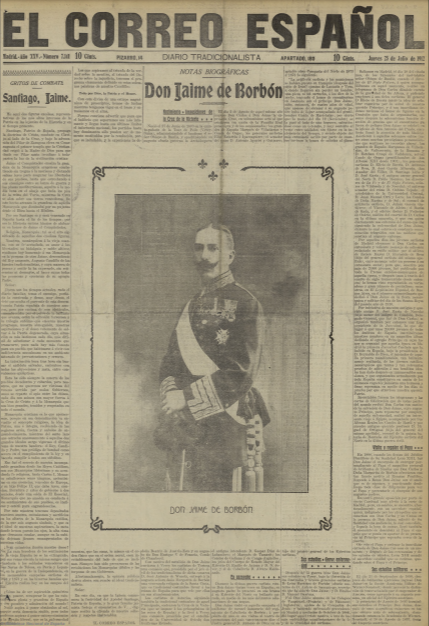
El Correo Español

The conflict between the Mellistas and the Jaimistas escalated during the Great War, as the former opted for the Central Powers (technically for neutrality) and the latter for the Entente. The position assumed by Sáenz was peculiar: together with Guillermo Izaga, Emilio Dean, Juan Pérez Najera and Bartolomé Feliú he formed the faction which favored Germany, but opposed de Mella and his political sponsor, the party leader marqués de Cerralbo. With Don Jaime incomunicado in his house arrest in Austria, Junta Nacional was increasingly paralyzed; Sáenz "continuaría con la vía restrictiva ortodoxia jaimista". The long-standing feud was brought to the climax in early 1919, when during open confrontation Don Jaime, back in France, expulsed de Mella and his supporters. The breakup decimated the Carlist command layer and in particular its publishing network, as numerous titles joined the rebels. At one point it seemed that this would be also the fate of El Correo Español; however, it was largely thanks to decisive action of Sáenz, fully loyal to his king, that takeover by the Mellistas has been prevented.

== From El Correo to El Cruzado (1919-1929) ==
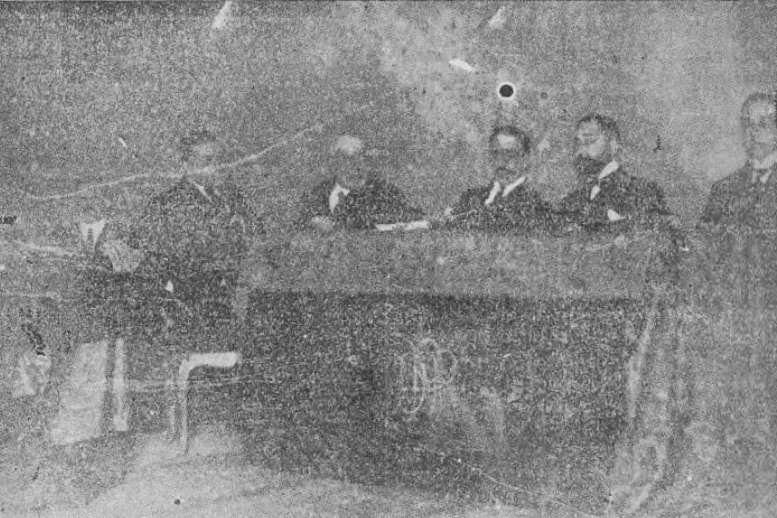
Sáenz at Jaimista meeting, 1920

In late 1919 Sáenz attended so-called Magna Junta de Biarritz, a grand congregation of leaders who remained loyal to Don Jaime; the purpose was to set the course for the future. It was there where he was nominated Tesorero de la Tradición, the man responsible for party finances; later this role was described as "tesorero general de la Comunión". His main task was to save El Correo Español, struggling following the Mellista secession. He was active in the press and during public meetings, asking for donations and subscriptions; sales of booklets with his address delivered in Biarritz was part of the scheme. In 1920 the ownership structure changed, as El Correo became the property of newly established Editorial Tradicionalista publishing house; he called to buy shares of the company. All this produced little effect. Despite Sáenz's own large donation, made in early 1921, later that year and following 33 years of continuous presence on the market, the daily closed.

In 1923 Sáenz was nominated vice-president (presidency went to Rodezno) of special committee, supposed to propose re-organization scheme for Comunión Jaimista; however, the advent of Primo dictatorship in 1923 brought political life to a standstill. In the early 1920s Sáenz - still resident in his Madrid luxurious apartment - was reported engaged merely in meta-political activities, like a rally in Lourdes or observance of Carlist feasts (in Madrid he co-presided over Mártires de la Tradición). In 1924 Don Jaime conferred upon him the title of Caballero de la Orden de Legitimidad Proscripta, the highest Carlist distinction, and in the mid-1920s Sáenz was regularly presents at Madrid religious services, organized on the nameday of the claimant. In the press he was noted either on societe columns or in relation to his private financial dealings in Llanes.

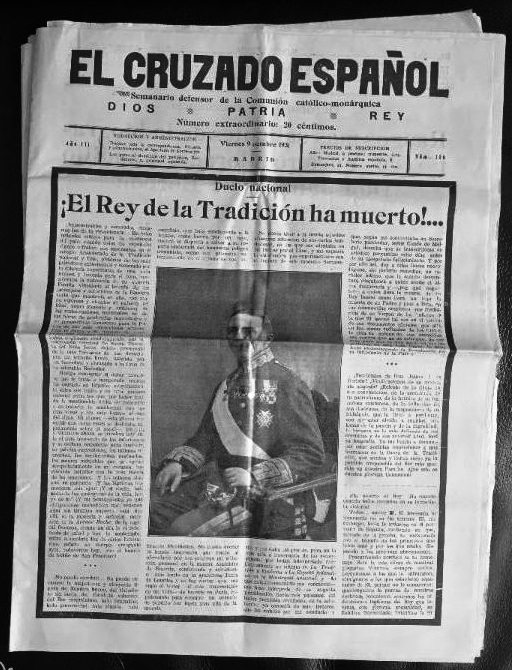
El Cruzado Español

In the late 1920s and on explicit orders from the claimant, Sáenz commenced efforts to launch a newspaper which would serve as an unofficial party mouthpiece, possibly a continuation of El Correo Español. Though there were well-established Carlist dailies issued in provincial capitals, e.g. in Pamplona or Barcelona, there was none issued centrally, where Traditionalism was represented by the competitive Integrist newspaper, El Siglo Futuro. Already in 1927 Sáenz made the first call to collect money; in 1928 he became treasurer of Obra de El Correo Español. The campaign bore fruit in 1929, when the first issue of El Cruzado Español hit the streets, though it was not a daily but a weekly. Officially it was launched by Circulo Jaimista de Madrid, yet as it was Sáenz its owner, it seems the periodical was funded mostly by his own money. Perhaps in recognition of his efforts, in 1929 he replaced Emilio Deán Berro as Jefe Regional of New Castile, the region which at the time comprised Madrid; he modestly referred to himself as "la pobre persona elegida por el Augusto Jefe".

== Jefe Regional (1929-1932) ==
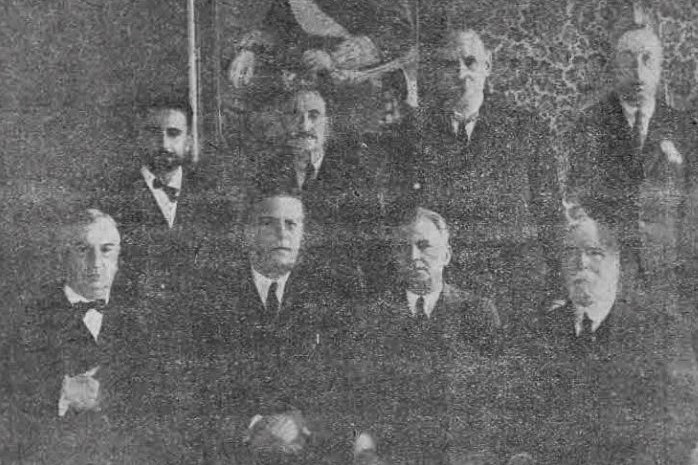
Sáenz in Junta Nacional, 1930

In 1930 Sáenz went on as the leader of Castilla La Nueva, taking part in meetings, making statements or acting as honorary president of local circulos. In May 1930 as member of Junta Nacional he co-signed a grand manifesto, which specified political vision for Spain. However, following the advent of the republic his position of a party patriarch started to change; scholars point to the Integrist and the Mellist question as the motive. When facing militant republican course, both factions were driven closer to the Jaimistas and in mid-1931 they seemed on the path towards a re-unification. Sáenz, who for decades acted as icon of loyalty and held a grudge against both currents, was getting increasingly upset. Another issue might have been the question of daily newspaper. In May Don Jaime wrote to the party leader Villores and to Sáenz about possibly resurrecting El Correo Español. Sáenz did not enter Comisión Gestora, entrusted with the task; reasons are not entirely clear, though he might have been embittered having invested own money in El Cruzado 2 years earlier.

Following death of Don Jaime and assumption of the claim by Don Alfonso Carlos, always somewhat sympathetic towards Integrismo, the idea of resurrecting El Correo was dropped in favor of making El Siglo Futuro, which was brought back as a dowry by the re-united Integristas, the new Carlist mouthpiece. For Sáenz it was a blow; he had systematically barred any offshoots from El Cruzado, which posed as "portavoz de la ortodoxia jaimista". Though in 1932 El Cruzado turned from weekly to bi-weekly and changed its sub-title from "semanario defensor de la Comunión Católico-Monárquica" to "Dios, Patria, Rey", it found itself sort of sidetracked. However, following earlier bitter hostility, in 1931-32 relations between El Cruzado and El Siglo were re-formatted as "coexistencia pacífica".

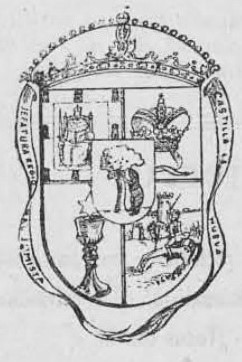
CoA of New Castile Jefatura Regional

In 1932 Don Alfonso Carlos nominated the new Junta Suprema, which mostly confirmed appointments of Don Jaime. Sáenz remained Jefe Regional of New Castile. To much surprise, he did not accept the nomination and quoting health reasons he resigned all 3 functions: co-president of Junta Suprema, president of its comisión ejecutiva, and Jefe Regional of New Castile. Historians claim that the decision was due to two factors. One was Sáenz's fundamental hostility towards the Integristas and the Mellistas, not only re-admitted but assuming high positions in the united organization, Comunión Tradicionalista. Another was his rancor towards a would-be reconciliation with the Alfonsists, advanced by leaders like Rodezno and Oriol and - or at least it might have seemed so - by Don Alfonso Carlos himself. Though Sáenz was not among the most militant opponents of a dynastic agreement, the party leader Villores was advised caution as to him. Eventually in 1932 Junta Suprema declared that El Cruzado did not represent Traditionalist orthodoxy. Some scholars claim that at this point the Cruzadistas were expulsed from the Comunión, but others maintain they were merely disauthorised.

== Last years (1932-1939) ==
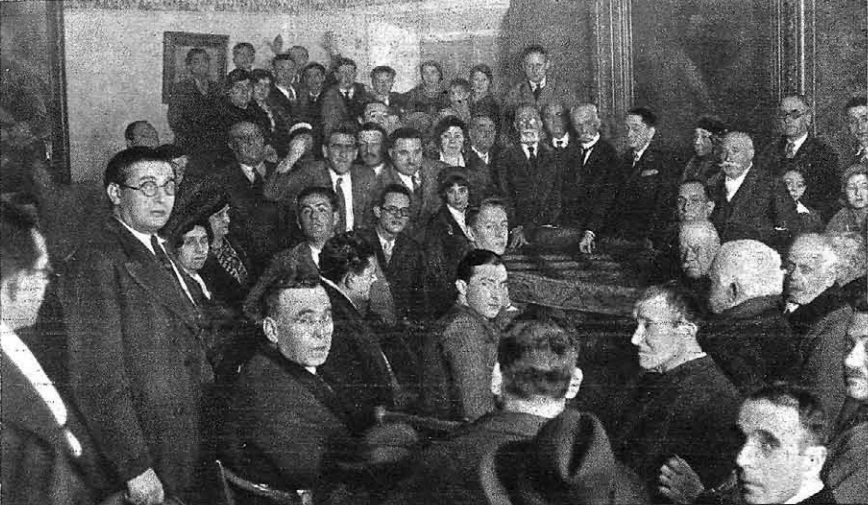
Sáenz at Cruzadista meeting, 1933

Following disauthorisation of El Cruzado the Cruzadistas formed a group named Núcleo de la Lealtad. Some historians claim that it was run by "cuadrilátero dirigente", which apart from Sáenz consisted of Izaga, Pérez Najera and Arana, others maintain that "this small but noisy faction", which failed "to attract much popular support", was led Sáenz and Jesús Cora y Lira. Instead of a dynastic accord with the Alfonsinos, they fiercely advocated that Don Alfonso Carlos - octogenarian and with no descendancy - appoints his successor. The claimant preferred not to burn the bridges and in mid-1932 he met the Cruzadistas in Toulouse. It is not clear whether Sáenz was present, yet it was his motion that was declared as allegedly adopted by so-called Asamblea de Toulouse; it claimed that if nomination of a successor does not take place, Don Alfonso Carlos organizes a grand assembly, which in turn would determine who the next king would be.

In 1933 Don Alfonso Carlos kept exchanging personal letters with Sáenz. Maintaining very correct tone and commencing with "mi querido Don Lorenzo Sáenz", the claimant nevertheless tried to convince the addressees that they should remain fully loyal, even in case he decides to seek understanding with the deposed Alfonso XIII; he also demanded that El Cruzado ceases its somewhat rebellious campaign. In a letter to the new Carlist political leader Rodezno he preferred not to resort to ultimate measures and declared that "son, pues, ellos así como cuantos les secundan, quienes dan el paso que les separa de nuestro Partido y no yo el que los hecha". Following sort of stand-off, in 1935 the Cruzadistas organized a grand assembly themselves; it materialized as so-called Asamblea de Zaragoza. The rally was presided by Sáenz. Its outcome was a manifesto, which declared archduke Karl Pius the next Carlist king and commenced the current known as Carloctavismo. Don Alfonso Carlos promptly disauthorised the gathering and its participants.

The wartime fate of Sáenz remains a mystery. It is not known whether the coup surprised him in one of his residences (Jaén, Madrid, Llanes). He is not mentioned in works dealing with the civil war in Jaén, Madrid or Asturias. In August 1936 a Santander-based newspaper published a note about concealed firearms, reportedly discovered by Republican security in Palacio Sinforiano in Llanes, "que ha venido occupando su pariente don Lorenzo Sáenz y Fernandez-Cortina, con residencia in Madrid", yet there was no news about him having been prosecuted. In June 1938, when Asturias was already under the Nationalist control, the Llanos municipal judge was dealing with some financial claims involving Sáenz, and referred to him as "residente en la Ciudad de Jaén, zona roja". Though after the war numerous newspapers published horror accounts by people who survived in the republican zone, no such recollections of Sáenz have surfaced. It is not clear why after the war he emerged in Jaén, and whether wartime fate contributed to his death 6 months after the conflict ended.

== See also ==
- Carlism
- El Correo Español
- El Cruzado Español
