= Celestino Alcocer Valderrama =

Spanish politician (1855-1924)

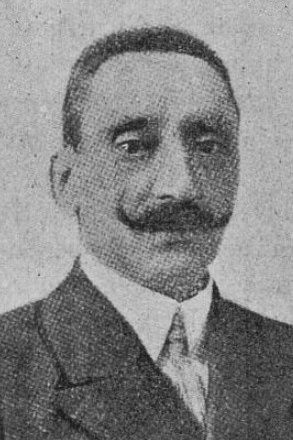
- Born: Celestino Alcocer Valderrama; 1855; Briviesca, Spain
- Died: 1924 (aged 68–69); Orduña, Spain
- Occupations: lawyer, landowner
- Known for: politician
- Political party: Carlism

Celestino Félix Alcocer Valderrama (1855-1924) was a Spanish politician. Throughout all his life, since teenage volunteering to legitimist troops, he supported the Carlist cause; his political career climaxed during two subsequent terms in the lower chamber of the Cortes in 1907-1914. Within Traditionalism in 1906-1914 he was the regional leader in Old Castile and the provincial one in Burgos; in 1908-1912 he was also Tesorero General, the key man behind the party finances. His activity was related to 3 provinces: his native Burgos, but also Biscay and Álava.

== Family and youth ==
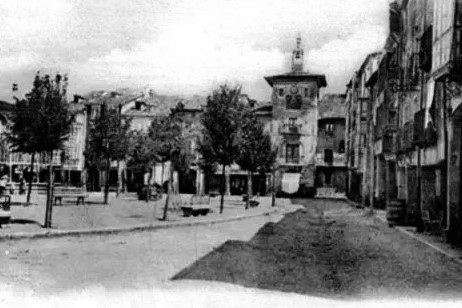
Briviesca, Plaza Mayor

One theory holds that the Alcocer line starts with a son to the king of Navarre, Sancho II. Since the Middle Ages the branch has been related to Bureba (Burgos province), and in particular to its key city, Briviesca. However, Celestino's only ancestor identified was his father, Bernabé Alcocer Arza (died 1888), also the native of Briviesca. He counted among minor landholders; in the mid-19th century he owned at least 200 ha in the province of Burgos, and possibly more in the province of Guadalajara. In 1848 he held the rank of teniente de milicias provinciales, and retired in 1852 as capitán graduado. Bernabé aspired to distinguished local roles; in 1866 he was running for diputación provincial and was successfully elected in 1871. His brothers held fairly high positions in judicature; in the 1850s and the 1860s Jacinto served as a longtime judge in Madrid, Baleares and especially Zaragoza, while Mateo was magistrado of Supremo Tribunal de Justicia and senator for Burgos (1887-1890) and Zaragoza (1893-1899).

At unspecified time Bernabé married Casilda de Valderrama; none of the sources consulted provides any information either on her or her family. The couple lived mostly in Briviesca; they had 4 children, apart from the only son Celestino also Teresa, Carlota, and Maria Augustina. As teenager since the late 1860s Celestino was frequenting Instituto Provincial de Burgos; in 1872 he completed the bachillerato curriculum and obtained the title in October 1872. Following the military episode of the Third Carlist War, in 1876 he enrolled at the law faculty in Universidad Central in Madrid, where he graduated in 1880 in derecho civil y canónico. It is not clear whether and if yes how much land Celestino inherited, as due to Carlist engagements the family estate was at least partially expropriated, even though as late as 1877 Alcocer Arza appeared as "propietario". In the early- and mid-1880s Celestino was rather noted as minor state official, subalterno de hacienda, first in the province of Logroño and then briefly in Cáceres. It was in 1886 that he was first listed as abogado.

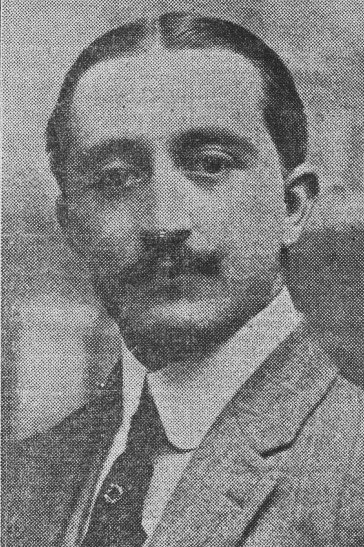
Alberto Alcocer y Ribacoba

At unknown date, though in 1884 latest, Alcocer married Dolores Ribacoba Olabarrieta from Orduña; her father partially owned salt ponds Salinas de Añana in Álava and the family counted among the richest in Valle de Ayala. The couple settled in Orduña, where Celestino practiced law. They had 5 children, all of them sons. The oldest one, Alberto Alcocer Ribacoba, became a high Francoist official; apart from serving as mayor of Madrid in 1923-24, he held the same position also in 1939-1946, later becoming secretary general of the Bank of Spain. Among Celestino's grandsons one died as military aviator when fighting with División Azul in Russia; another became a known stockbroker. Celestino's great-grandsons, Alberto Alcocer Torra and Alberto Cortina Alcocer, two cousins in the media often referred to as "Albertos", are among the richest people in Spain. Active in construction, minerals, agriculture and other businesses, they are subject to numerous controversies.

== Early Carlist engagements (before 1893) ==
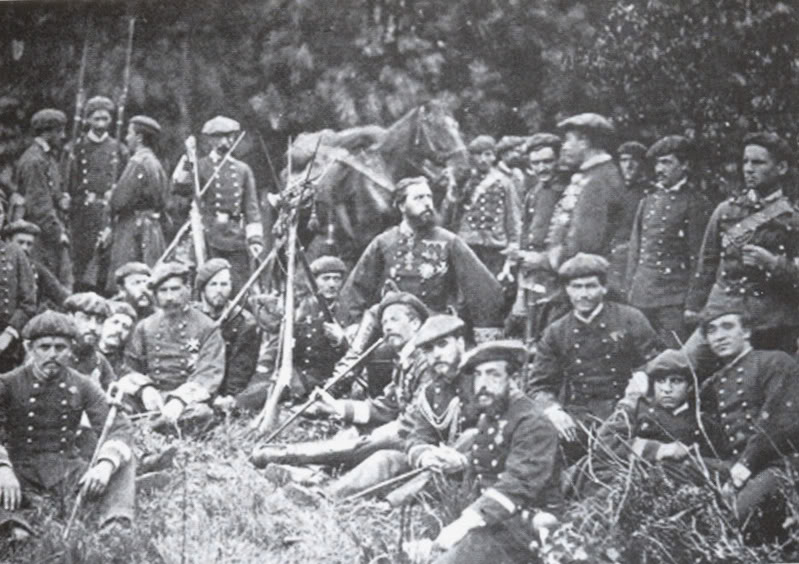
Carlos VII during Third Carlist War

Celestino's father was an ardent Carlist; in his youth he served in legitimist ranks during the First Carlist War in the 1830s, following the defeat accepted as lieutenant in the governmental army thanks to so-called Convenio de Vergara. Engaged in lawsuits against the state, he joined the Traditionalists also during the Third Carlist War, and in the early 1870s served as vice-president of Diputación de Castilla (the Carlist one). Following another defeat he suffered some repressive measures, including expropriation, yet until death he remained president of the Carlist junta in Briviesca. Celestino was 17 years old at the outbreak of the Third Carlist War. According to a later highly hagiographic account, Bernabé when assuming duties in service of Carlos VII ordered his son to look after home and the family economy. However, Celestino decided to disobey; together with a servant he reported to the Carlist capital in Estella, where admitted to cavalry, he served as ayudante de campo of general Juan Zaratiegui Celigüeta. His later fate and wartime itinerary is unclear; one source claims he served in tercer escuadrón de Navarra under command of Aureliano Real. After the war he was subject to governmental military service as part of "segundo reemplazo de 1875" from Briviesca; however, he paid his way off and in 1876 it was declared that Celestino "ha cubierto su responsibilidad per medio de sustituto".

Carlist standard

There is close to no information on Alcocer's public and political engagements in the 1880s, especially that as civil servant he periodically served in distant locations like Extremadura. At the time Carlism was suffering from post-defeat crisis and hardly existed as an organized structure. It was following the 1888 Integrist secession that the mainstream current assumed more active stand, animated by the new political leader, marqués de Cerralbo. Alcocer remained loyal to his king and did not join the breakaways; however, his entry into politics was allegedly motivated not by dynastical reasons, but was triggered rather by "sentimientos religiosos". He engaged in parallel in Traditionalist structures in his native Burgos province and - due to his Orduña residence - in Álava. In 1891 he took part in funeral ceremonies of marqués de Valdespina, the iconic Carlist leader in Vascongadas; in 1891-1892 he was noted as secretario of Junta Provincial of Álava. However, also in 1892 it was in Burgos that he launched a Carlist weekly, El Centinela, and served as its co-director. The periodical kept appearing for barely a year. Still in 1892, he co-signed a letter of support for the Carlist candidate to the Burgos diputación provincial from Briviesca, Lope Riaño y Castro; it was of no avail and Riaño failed to make it to the self-government.

== Aspiring politician (1893-1907) ==
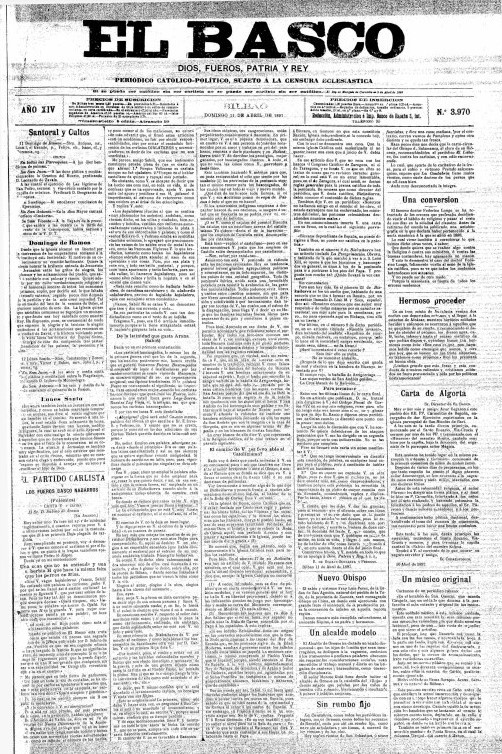
El Basco

During parliamentary elections of 1893 the Carlists fielded 29 candidates; though previously it was José Comenzana running from Burgos, this time it was Alcocer who replaced him. He performed rather poorly and turned the least popular of all 5 hopefuls. He gathered 5,055 votes, while the front runner, a liberal Federico Martínez del Campo, was first supported by 9,242 voters; it was only in few locations, like Ibeas de Juarros, Espinosa del Camino, Susinos, or Las Hormazas, where Alcocer came first. Following the defeat, in course of the next 14 years he would not stand in any of the 6 electoral campaigns.

Since the mid-1890s Alcocer focused his political endeavors on Vascongadas instead of Old Castile. He was noted taking part in various local Traditionalism-flavored events, e.g. in 1896 in Bilbao. In 1897 he assumed management of the Carlist daily El Basco, published since 1884 in the Biscay capital. His tenure was rather brief. Already in 1898 first the periodical was suspended by military authorities, and then charges were brought against him, though it is not clear what exactly triggered the juridical action; he spent some time in detention. Eventually El Basco ceased to appear. In 1899 he was probably involved in Carlist conspiracy, gearing up towards an eventually abandoned rising; a later hagiographic account in aesopian language hinted at his taking part. The only official engagement of this year was his taking part in a Catholic congress, where he represented Orduña.

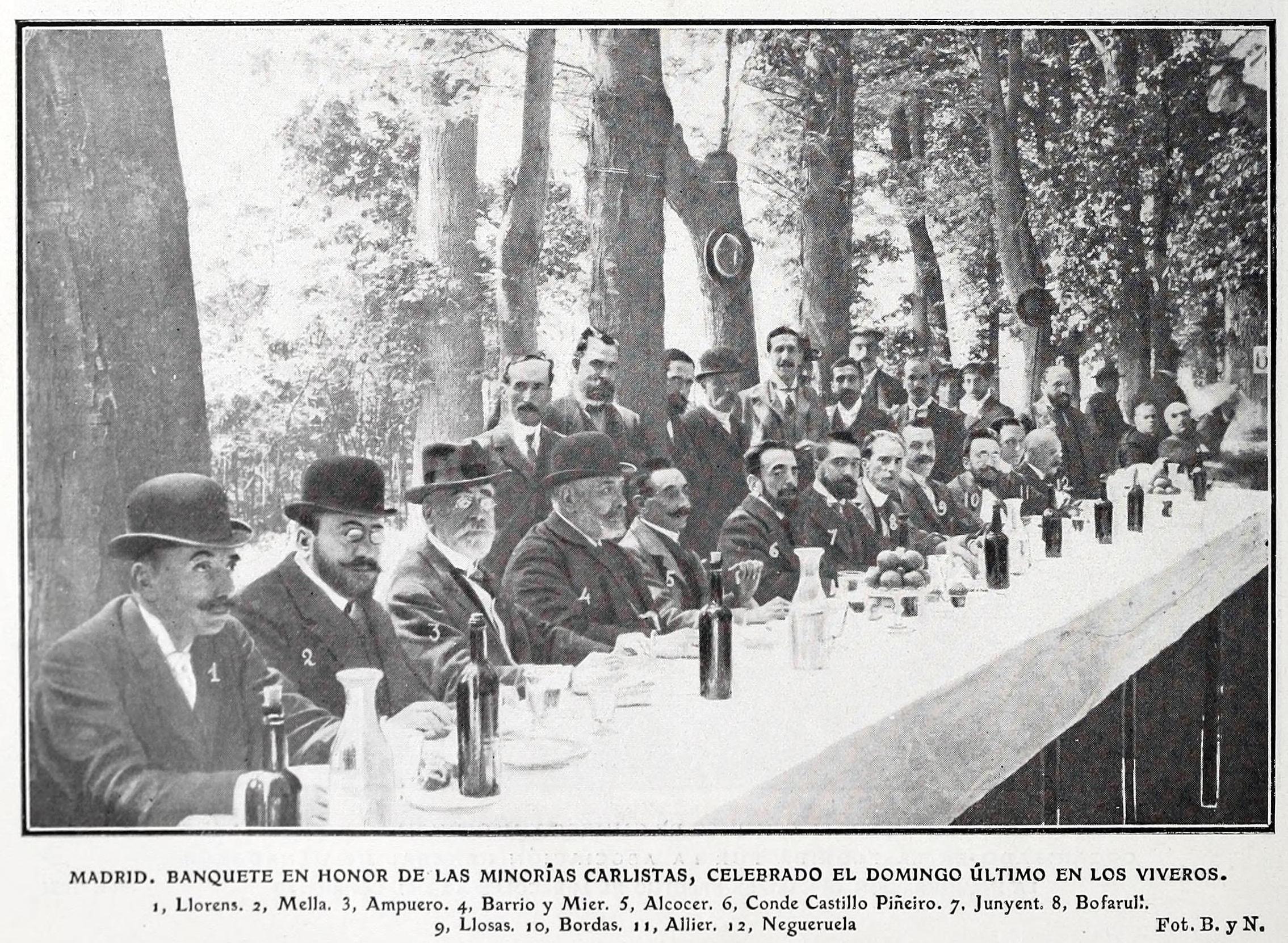
Alcocer and de Mella at banquet, 1907

In the early 1900s Alcocer emerged as a prestigious personality in Orduña. Apart from estates brought in as dowry by his wife, bordering Biscay and Álava, he attempted to commence exploration of iron ore in La Rioja, as he applied for license to open and then operated a pit named "Elena" near Ortigosa de Cameros. He was also involved in opening a short railway line, though it is unclear what mechanism resulted in his business engagement in Ciudad Real province. He went on as abogado in Orduña. In 1903 he was voted into the city council, but his election was annulled due to irregularities; he eventually gained the seat in ayuntamiento in 1905, where he would be involved in conflict related to location of another railway line, affecting his possessions.

Alcocer rose to presidency of the Carlist junta in Orduña and as such he featured at some local events. In the mid-1900s he accompanied the Carlist pundit Juan Vázquez de Mella in Bilbao and hosted him in his house, Villa Dolores, in central Orduña. In 1905 he was nominated the Carlist jefe provincial in the Burgos province, and in 1906 he assumed jefatura of Junta Regional of the entire Old Castile, a rather unusual appointment given at the time his links to Briviesca, Burgos and Castile were rather loose. Engaged in typical propaganda activities like signing open letters, e.g. to the Pope, he also started to feature as presidente honorario in various local Carlist círculos, e.g. in the town of Padilla de Abajo.

== Cortes deputy (1907-1913) ==
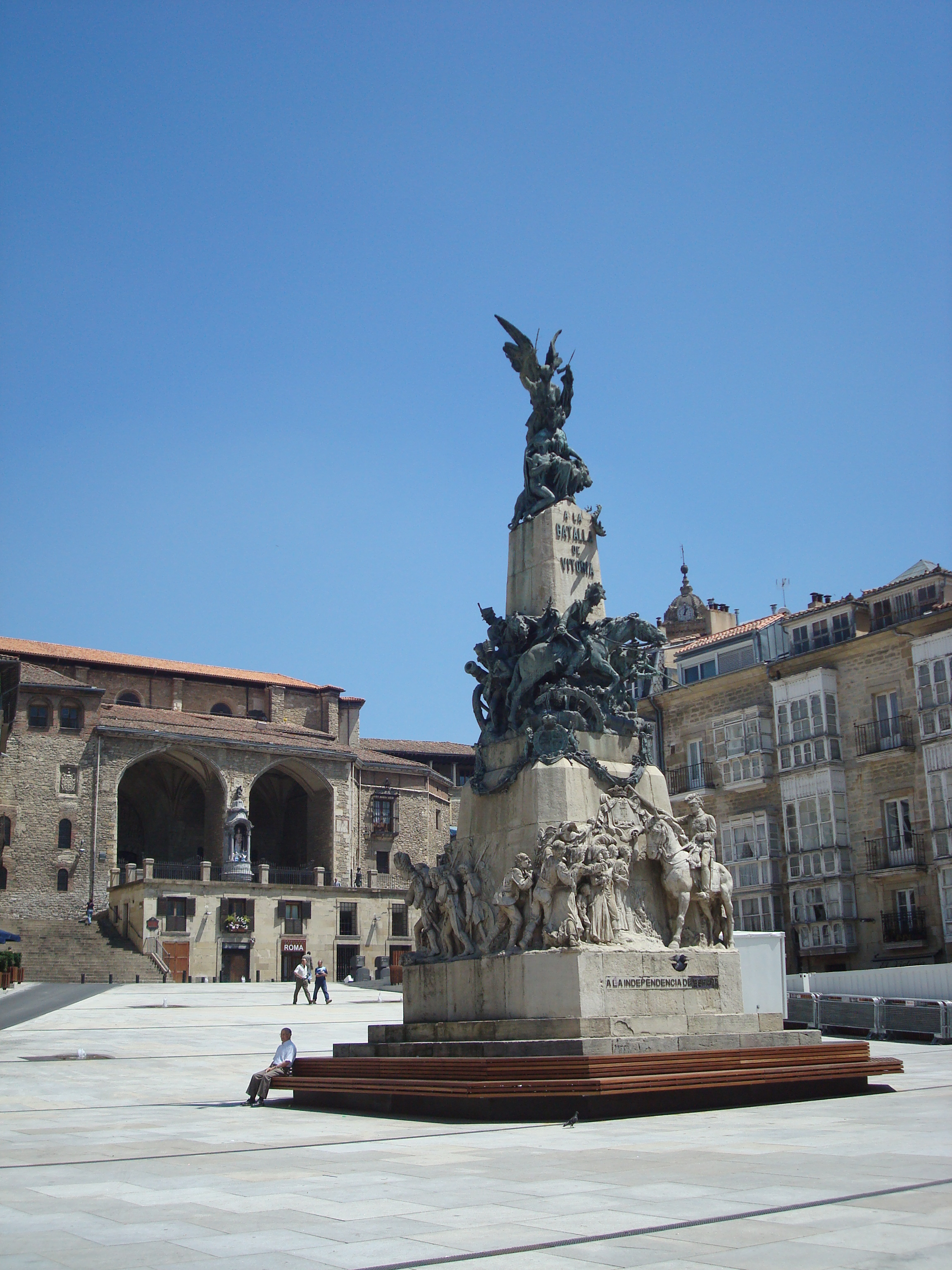
Vitoria monument

In 1907 the usual Carlist contender from Laguardia, Antonio Mazarrassa, opted for the senate; Alcocer stood as his replacement for the lower chamber. He ran as cuckoo candidate against Hurtado de Amézaga and Martínez de Aragón, and emerged victorious largely because the liberal vote was split; he got 2,461 votes out of 4,362 cast. Alcocer entered the budgetary commission but was barely mentioned in the press, usually when lobbying for infrastructural investments in his region. In 1910 he was running also in Álava, but this time in Vitoria as a joint Carlist-Integrist candidate appointed by Carlist Vascongadas jefe Tirso Olazábal. Alcocer defeated the republican candidate Aniceto Lorente with 4,293 out of 7,302 votes cast. He joined the budgetary commission and was later noted in its works. He gained attention when declared he would smash the head of Félix Azzati rather than allow him to blaspheme against Virgin Mary, and as the only MP who adhered to voto particular of 3 Basque deputies, who demanded reintegracion foral. Perhaps his longest-lasting initiative was a motion to finance the monument to the 1813 Battle of Vitoria.

Within Carlism in 1908 Alcocer was nominated treasurer of jefatura delegada, later as Tesorero General, the key man in party finances. Continuing as president of Junta Regional de Castilla la Vieja he counted among nationwide Traditionalist leaders, attending also the funeral of Carlos VII in Trieste in 1909. When Bartolomé Feliú, Carlist leader in the Cortes, was absent, it was Alcocer representing Minoría Católico-Monárquica. In 1910 as sort of finance manager in name of Carlist publishing house he purchased a building at calle Pizarro in Madrid, which was to house El Correo Español; together with Feliú and Lorenzo Saénz he was among largest donators to Tesoro de la Tradición. He entered Junta Directiva of Centro Tradicionalista of Madrid and in 1912 as representative of Old Castile held a seat in Junta Nacional.

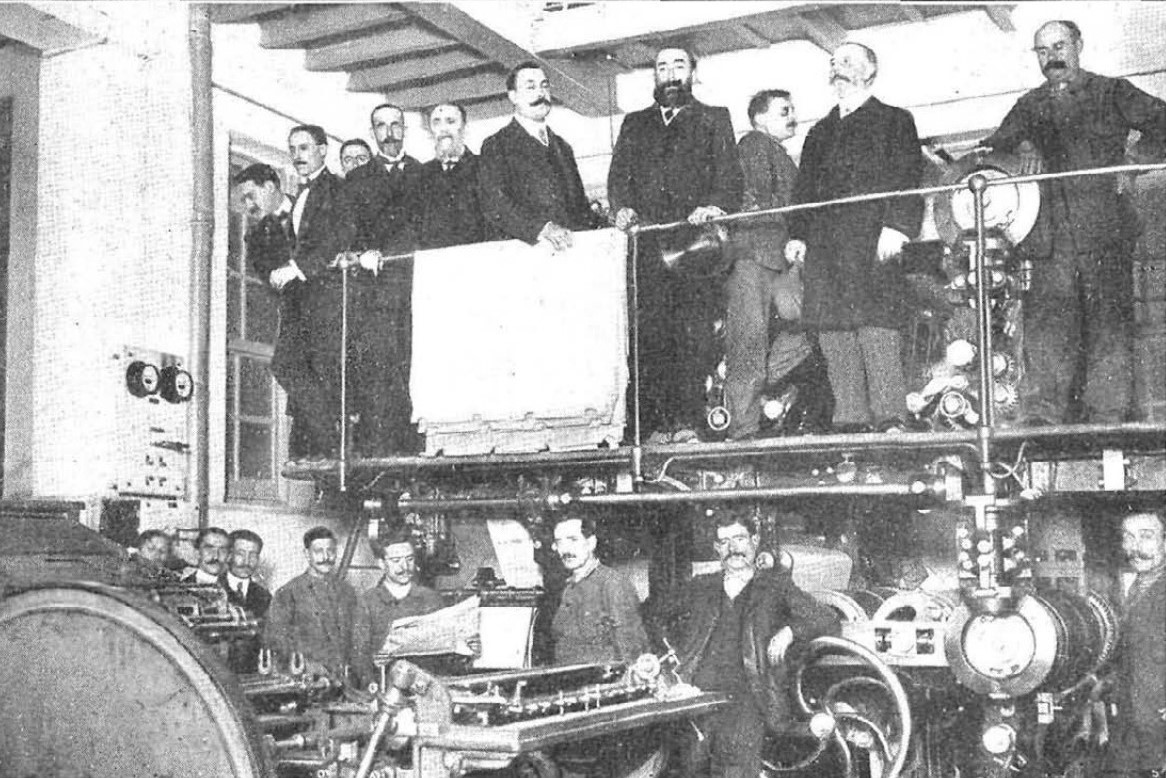
opening of Calle Pizarro premises, 1912

As regional leader and the Cortes deputy Alcocer was involved in usual Carlist propaganda activities. Some were about attending local events, be it in provincial capitals like Bilbao, in Orduña or in small locations like Yecora. Some were acting as honorary president of various local juntas, also of the youth branches, e.g. in Vitoria. Some were co-signing various open letters, be it to the local civil governor, to the papal nuncio or to the public. In the 1910s Carlism was increasingly paralyzed by internal fragmentation. However, Alcocer was not its protagonist; he is not mentioned in monographic works on the conflict between Vázquez de Mella and Feliú and this between de Mella and the king, Jaime III. He is rather known as involved in controversies in Vitoria against Enrique Ortiz de Zarate and in Burgos against Tomás Alonso Armiño. Though hailed in party propaganda as a belligerent man of action he was member of Liga Antiduelista, a somewhat unusual preference hardly expected of a Carlist.

== Retirement (after 1913) ==
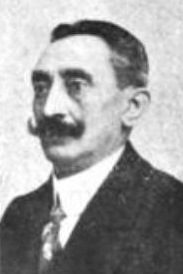
Alcocer, 1910s

In the early 1910s Alcocer was increasingly suffering from poor health. Though barely 60 years old, he was often missing both during the Cortes sittings and in party meetings. In 1912 he quoted health problems and related absences, and resigned as Recaudador General del Tesoro de la Tradición; resignation was accepted by his king, Don Jaime, and as the key party finance man he was replaced by Mazarrassa. In 1913 he filed his resignation also from the Cortes, yet the official Congreso de Diputados site quotes 1914 as the year when his service terminated. The liberal press claimed that the resignation "ha sorprendido sobremanera", especially given he continued as president of Junta Regional of the Old Castile. However, in 1914 he resigned also this post, thus ending his 8-year-long period of leading jefatura regional. It is not clear whether he resigned also from Jefatura Provincial in Burgos; if so, he would have held no official posts within Carlism.

In the general elections of 1914 Alcocer was initially supposed to stand, again from district of Vitoria. However, this was merely part of the pre-electoral maneuvering, intended to prevent default nomination of Eduardo Dato; as the only candidate standing, he would have obtained the parliamentary ticket thanks to notorious Article 29 of the electoral regime. As there is no information on Alcocer's result, he probably withdrew shortly before or on the voting day. During the following campaign of 1916 Alcocer also registered his candidature, but this time in Laguardia. Later some newspapers reported his extremely poor performance in some villages, yet given most titled ignored him, he might have withdrawn as well. The last time Alcocer was noted as a would-be candidate was during the 1918 campaign, registered again in Laguardia but this time also in Vitoria. Like in 1914 and 1916, there is close to nothing known about any result he might have obtained in case he did not withdraw from the race.

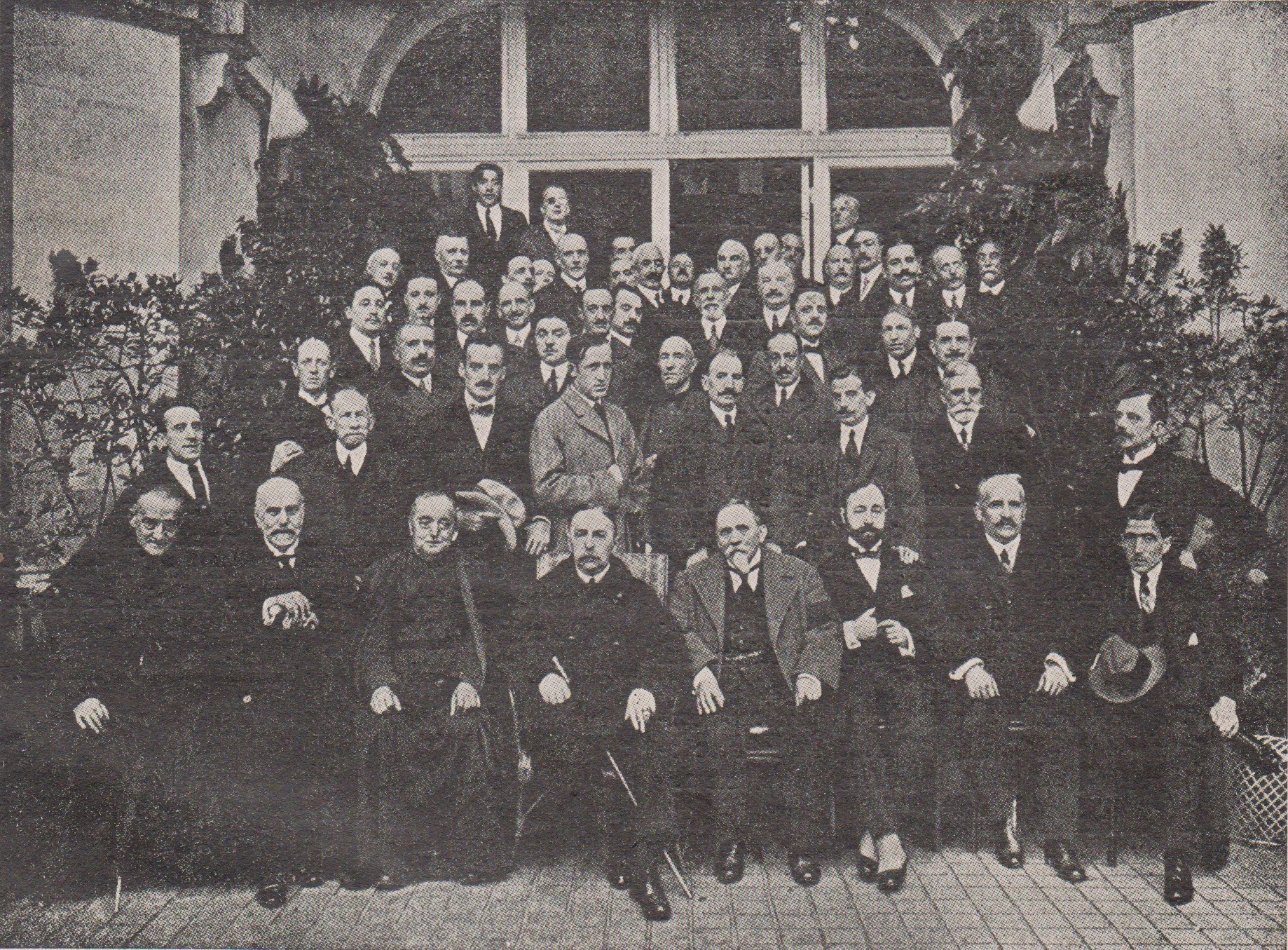
Magna Junta de Biarritz, 1919

The conflict between the key theorist Juan Vázquez de Mella and the claimant Don Jaime was brewing during the Great War, when the latter was under sort of a house arrest and incommunicado in Austria; it climaxed in early 1919, when the followers of de Mella left Carlism to build their own branch of Traditionalism, known as Mellismo. Alcocer did not join the breakaways and remained loyal to his king. Later in 1919 his health did not allow him to travel to southern France and attend so-called Magna Junta de Biarritz, supposed to set a new course; however, he sent a letter of support and declared himself the adherent of Jaime III; in later party propaganda he was listed among the "adheridos". However, in 1920 he was confined to bed and hardly active, save for membership in Catholic organisations. Though his son rose to alcalde of Madrid, it is not known what Celestino's opinion about the Primo dictatorship was. His wife Dolores died in January 1924, and he followed 9 months later.

== See also ==
- Carlism
- Traditionalism (Spain)

== Footnotes ==
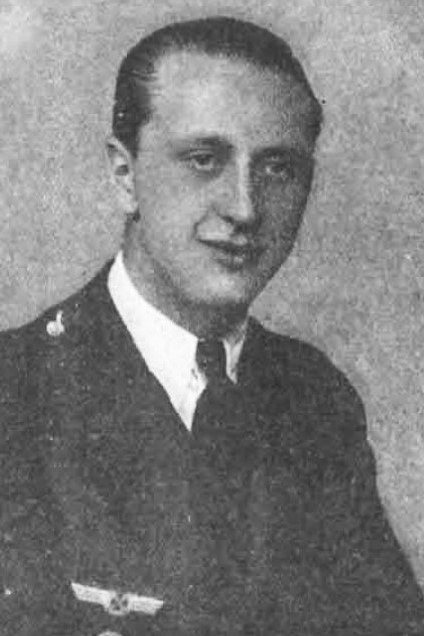
Luis Alcocer
