= Cerca de Villaño =

Enclave in Spain

- Enclave and exclave
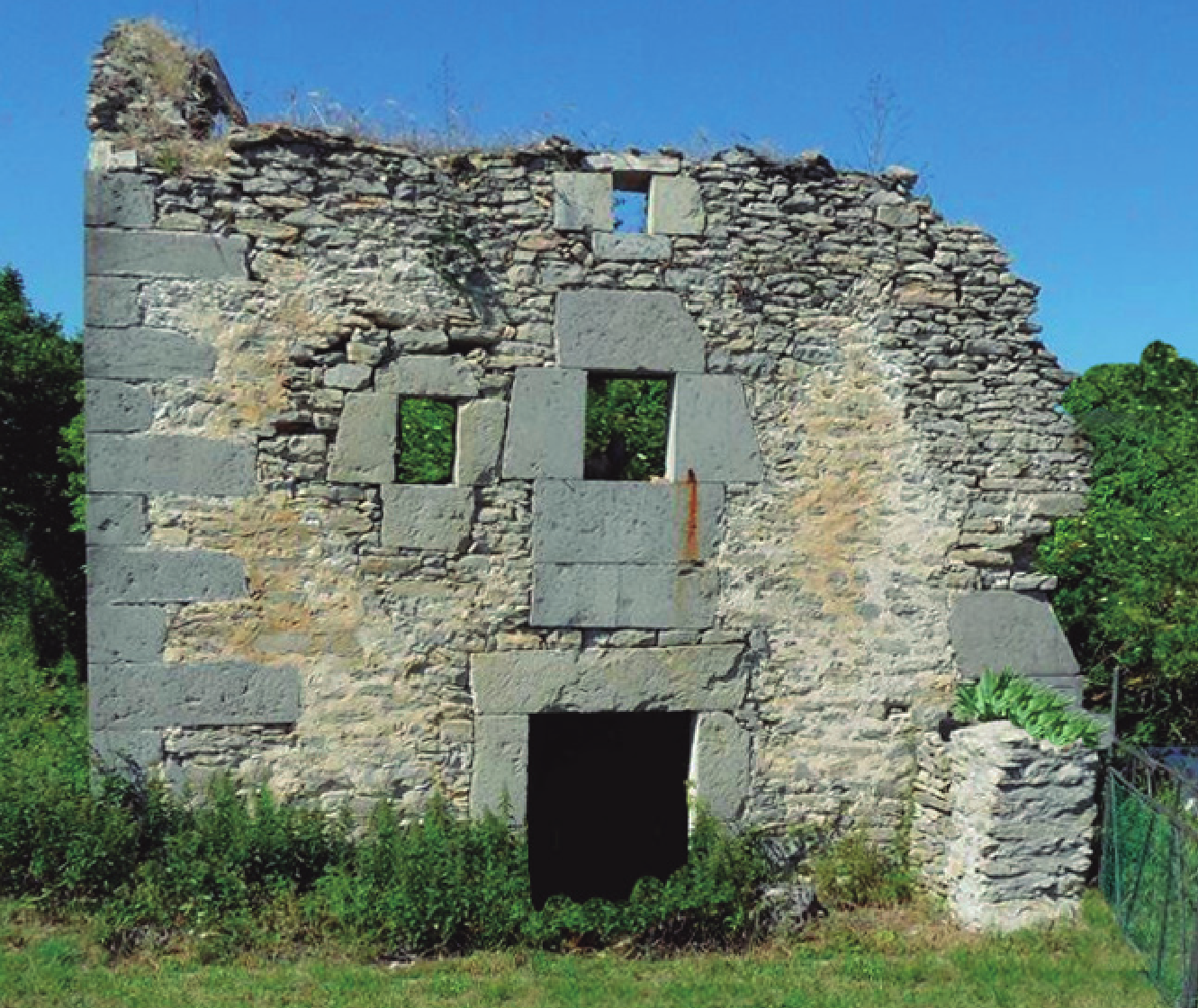
- A ruined house in the exclave
- Interactive map of Cerca de Villaño
- Location within the Basque Country
- Coordinates: 42°58′09″N 3°07′21″W
- Country: Spain
- Autonomous community: Basque Country
- Province: Biscay
- Comarca: Arratia-Nerbioi
- Municipality: Orduña

Area
  - Total: 0.36 ha (0.89 acres)
- Elevation: 807 m (2,648 ft)

The Cerca de Villaño (Basque: Villañoko esparrua) is a small exclave belonging to Orduña, itself an exclave of Biscay (a province of the Basque Country, Spain). It is located in Villaño, a hamlet in Valle de Losa, Burgos. Its area and limits aren't known with certainty, and due to its small size and obscurity it isn't shown in most maps.

The early history of the enclave is unclear, but it was part of Orduña by the early sixteenth century. The municipal authorities of Orduña used to visit the exclave regularly until 1951 in order to check the border markers. Around the same time, in 1950, the few inhabitants of the enclave were registered as inhabitants of Valle de Losa, and the exclave fell into obscurity.

In 2015, a member of the Juntas Generales of Biscay requested the Biscayan government to reaffirm the exclave's status as part of Biscay, but his proposal was rejected. In 2022, the municipality of Orduña started the procedures to survey the exclave and include it in its urban planning documentation.
