= Álvaro Morales (politician) =

Spanish politician (born 1980)

Member of the Congress of Deputies
- Incumbent
- Assumed office 17 August 2023
- Constituency: Burgos

Personal details
- Born: 20 May 1980 (age 45)
- Party: Spanish Socialist Workers' Party

Álvaro Morales Álvarez (born 20 May 1980) is a Spanish politician serving as a member of the Congress of Deputies since 2023. From 2019 to 2023, he served as mayor of Briviesca.
