= Antonio Mazarrasa Quintanilla =

Spanish politician, civil servant and entrepreneur

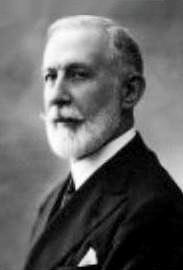
- Born: 1864; Villaverde de Pontones, Spain
- Died: 1941 (aged 76–77); Madrid, Spain
- Occupation: lawyer
- Known for: politician
- Political party: Carlism

Antonio María Andrés Mazarrasa Quintanilla (1864–1941) was a Spanish politician, civil servant and entrepreneur. Politically he initially supported the Carlists, then he joined the breakaway Mellistas, and eventually he engaged in Primoriverrista structures. In the 1890s he was a member of the Santander ayuntamiento. His parliamentarian career climaxed during two terms in the lower chamber of the Cortes (1903–1905 and 1910–1914) and one term in the senate (1919–1920). In 1924–1927 he served as civil governor of the Segovia province. In 1928–1936 and 1939–1940 he was the managing director of Monte de Piedad y Caja de Ahorros de Madrid. Until the late 1920s he was engaged in a family-held Mazarrasa mining conglomerate in Cantabria.

== Family and youth ==
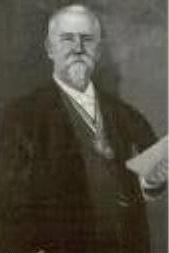
father

The family of Mazarrasa for centuries has been representative for Cantabrian rural hidalguia with its members active in the bar, army and officialdom, though also in arts. The great-grandfather of Antonio, Juan Manuel Mazarrasa Mazarrasa (1746-1824), was the native of Villaverde de Pontones, a village in the Trasmiera county; he served as Abogado de los Reales Consejos. His younger son and the grandfather of Antonio, Felipé Mazarrasa Cobo de la Torre (1789-1879), inherited the grand family house in Villaverde and became one of the 50 largest rural taxpayers in the Santander province. His son and the father of Antonio, Juan Manuel Mazarrasa Jorganes (1827-1898), also from Villaverde, became a lawyer. He represented in court some major creditors of La Providencia and La Esperanza, Cantabrian mining companies extracting zinc and lead ores in Andara, in eastern parts of Picos de Europa; eventually in the 1880s he purchased the troubled companies on auction and re-oriented the family economy from agriculture and rental of rural properties to industry.

Mazarrasa Jorganes married Josefa Quintanilla López-Galmares (died 1906), daughter to an enriched indiano originated from the Salamanca province and his Mexican wife, both settled in Cantabria. The couple lived in the family residence in Villaverde de Pontones and had 10 children, born between the mid-1860s and the mid-1880s; Antonio was the oldest one. Though 3 younger sons became engineers, supposed to manage technicalities of the mining business, Antonio was licenciado in law in Valladollid and then moved to Universidad Central in Madrid. In the early 1880s he was noted as an active student; following graduation in 1885 and his brief apprenticeship period later, in 1887 he entered Colegio de Abogados in Santander and opened his own law firm in the Cantabrian capital, soon to look after legal affairs of the Mazarrasa mining conglomerate.

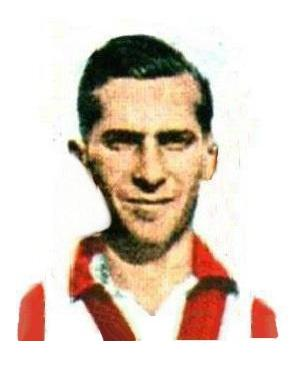
son Antonio

Already in his late 30s, in 1902, Antonio Mazarrasa married María de la Concepción Fernández de Henestrosa Tacón (1878–1968); she was daughter to a retired Madrid military Francisco Javier Fernández de Henestrosa Santiestban, who claimed aristocratic titles of Marqués de Villadarias, Marqués de Vera, and some other. The couple settled in Santander and had 6 children, born between the early 1900s and the early 1910s. One son perished during infancy in 1917; two others were executed by the Republicans in 1936, one in Bilbao and one – who started to earn his name as an Atletico Madrid winger – in Paracuellos de Jarama. The oldest son Roberto Mazarrasa Fernández (1903–1981) became a career officer in the artillery corps. Among Antonio's grandchildren the best known one was a military historian, Javier Mazarrasa Coll; his brother Agustín went into the footsteps of his grandfather and in the late 20th century he held managerial roles in Caja de Ahorros y Monte Piedad de Madrid. The Catholic priest-singer Gonzalo Mazarrasa Martín and a writer Lucia Botín Mazarrasa are descendants of Mazarrasa's brother, while authors from the Mazarrasa Mowinckel family are descendants of his sister.

== Early public career (until 1902) ==
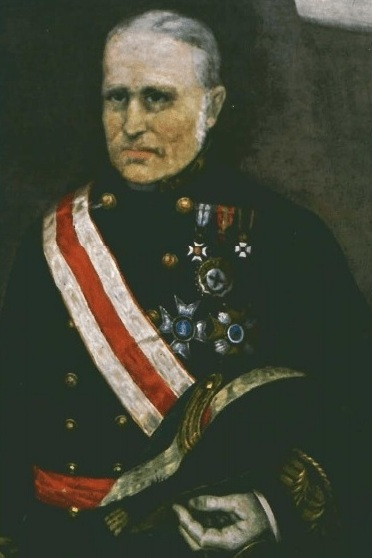
José de Mazarrasa Cobo de la Torre

The Mazarrasas held firmly reactionary views. The older brother of Antonio's paternal grandfather, José de Mazarrasa Cobo de la Torre (1772-1858), was among leaders of Voluntarios Realistas and rose to highest positions in the legitimist army during the First Carlist War, nominated mariscal de campo. Antonio's grandfather held minor roles in Carlist structures of the late Isabelline period, while his relative José Tomás de Mazarrasa served as bishop of Ciudad Rodrigo and Filipopolis. The young Antonio inherited their political outlook; already during his academic years he signed letters protesting secularization in education, and then he married a girl from the vehemently Carlist family. Initially he was active in technically non-political organizations flavored with conservative spirit, e.g. in the late 1880s he was noted in Milicia Cristiana of Santander. However, Mazarrasa engaged also in charity and education, e.g. as member of Real Sociedad Económica Cantábrica de Amigos de País. In 1892, he became president of Círculo Tradicionalista in Santander. Mazarrasa cultivated also personal cultural links.

Already in the late 1880s Mazarrasa was voted into the Santander ayuntamiento; in 1892 he rose to primer teniente de alcalde. Having his ticket in the council prolonged in the 1893 elections in the mid-1890s, he served as tercer teniente de alcalde and as president of Comisión de Obras of the town hall. He animated some municipal cultural and leisure institutions. In the late 1890s he was among major shareholders of municipal bonds. His spell in the ayuntamiento continued; as a coalition candidate Mazarrasa was re-elected in 1901, though in 1902 he lost the internal city council elections for the post of deputy mayor.

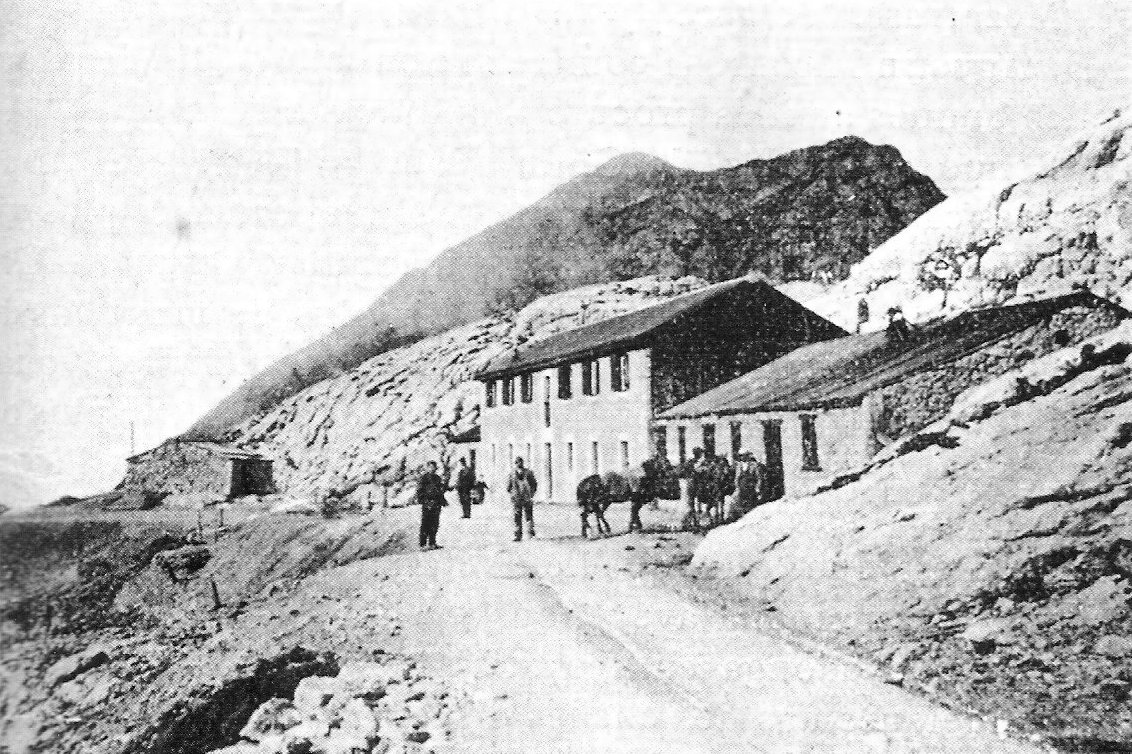
Minas Mazarrasa mining facilities, Andara, Picos de Europa

Continuously active in the bar, he was increasingly engaged in business, also abroad, representing the family interests in Britain; in 1898 Mazarrasa Jorganes died and the brothers agreed their roles in Minas Mazarrasa. In 1899 he entered the board of Nueva Montaña, a family-held steelworks company. In 1900 as representative of Cantabria Mazarrasa joined the executive of Sociedad Española de Minas, a newly formed local cartel, and in 1901, he became a member of the board of Hidráulica de Frésser, supposed to operate a hydro power plant in Catalonia. His political engagements at the time were muted. The press did not note any activities, and also contemporary scholars when discussing Carlist history of the late 19th century do not mention Mazarrasa. Reportedly, in 1893, he agreed with the party leader Marqués de Cerralbo that he would run for the Cortes from Vitoria, but there is no follow-up known. His 1897 taking part in a local party rally in Liébana, where he accompanied one of the parliamentarian Carlist leaders Matías Barrio y Mier, was rather exceptional.

== Carlist deputy (1903–1914) ==
Carlist standard

In the 1903 elections to Congreso de los Diputados, the lower chamber of the Cortes, Mazarrasa stood as a Carlist beyond his native Cantabria, in the Basque district of Laguardia; the last Carlist triumph there was recorded in 1893, followed by defeats in 4 successive campaigns. Though he was a cuckoo candidate he emerged triumphant; with 3,806 votes gathered out of 4,067 votes cast he trashed the liberal counter-candidate. He resigned the ayuntamiento mandate as incompatible with the Cortes ticket; in the chamber he formed a tiny, 7-member Carlist minority. However, the Cortes term proved very brief and lasted only until 1905. Mazarrasa was barely active; the official Cortes records note only his intervention in favor of legislation on Cantabrian mining, which was supposed to expedite river transport and loading facilities in the Bay of Santander. During the 1905 campaign he tried to renew the mandate, again running on the Carlist ticket from Laguardia, but this time he lost to a Liberal canalejista counter-candidate. Briefly nominated to Santander town hall as consejal interino, during the following general election of 1907 Mazarrasa ceded the would-be Laguardia mandate to a fellow Carlist Celestino Alcocer. Himself he opted for the senate, also from Álava, but he lost.

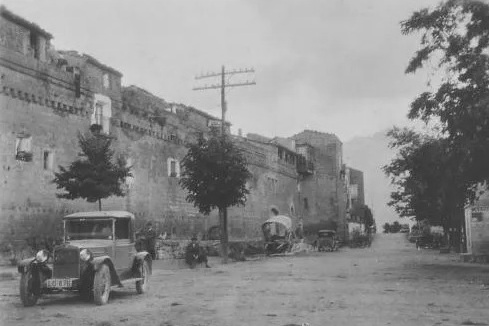
Laguardia, early 20th c.

In the 1910 campaign Mazarrasa resumed his bid for the lower chamber from Laguardia; with 2,520 votes gathered out of 4,920 votes cast he was narrowly elected; this time the Carlist minority amounted to 9 MPs. His official record in the chamber is negligible, as there are almost no interventions recorded; the key Carlist campaign was directed against a so-called Ley del Candado. However, during the 4-year term Mazarrasa was rather active mobilizing popular support during rallies and meetings, e.g. in 1911 in Vitoria or in 1912 in Eibar. In 1912 he replaced Celestino Alcocer as Recaudador General del Tesoro de la Tradición, key person responsible for the party finances. In 1913 he welcomed his king Don Jaime, who technically incognito was visiting Santander. Other means of propaganda were issuing joint open letters, publicized in Traditionalist press, funding prizes at Juegos Florales, e.g. in 1911, or attending banquets, e.g. in Labastida in 1913. His position in the party was increasingly prestigious; apart from cases of exaltation in Traditionalist papers he was being asked to act as presidente honorario of some juvenile circles. In 1913 he was first noted as a member of the nationwide Carlist executive, Junta Nacional, which he entered by virtue of his Cortes mandate. However, in 1914 Mazarrasa's term in the Congress expired. Also in 1914 he launched his candidature for the Senate, but failed.

== Mellista (1915–1923) ==
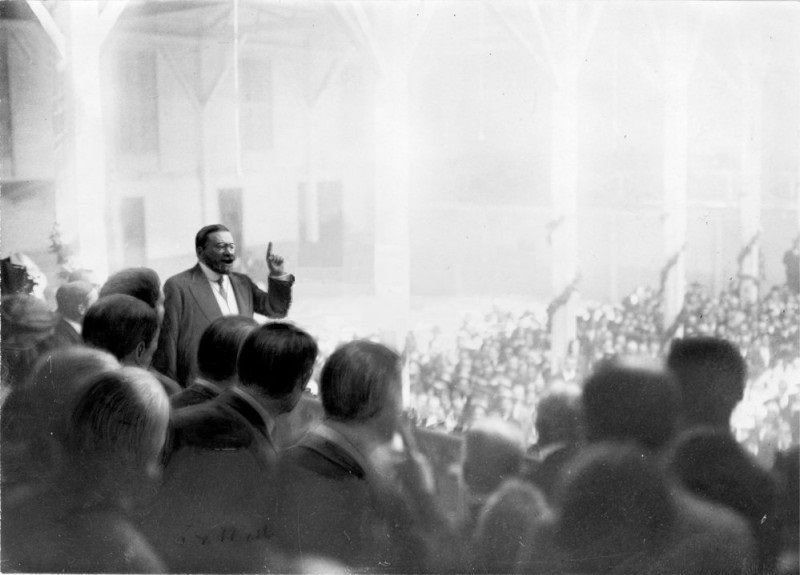
De Mella speaking, 1910s

In the 1910s Carlism was increasingly paralyzed by a conflict between the claimant Don Jaime and the key party theorist, Juan Vázquez de Mella. The latter favored a grand ultra-right coalition with dynastic questions de-emphasized and pro-German stand during the Great War; the former prioritized his own claim over would-be political alliances and sympathized with the Entente. Mazarrasa was not among protagonists of the strife; a monographic study on the emergent Mellismo mentions his name only once. He appeared to have been on at least correct terms with the party leadership, as in 1917 he was reported as Traditionalist jefe provincial in his native Santander. However, he did not adopt a rigid, Carlist dynastic stand; when in 1918 Alfonso XIII toured Cantabria and visited industrial installations of Altos Hornos de Nueva Montaña, Mazarrasa effusively welcomed him on site.

In early 1919 the conflict between Don Jaime and de Mella erupted into open confrontation; the Mellistas left to form their own organisation. Mazarrasa remained in the back row, but eventually he decided to support the rebels and to abandon the loyalty to his king. During general elections in June 1919 he represented the emerging Mellista structures when running for the senate, again from the province of Alava. Though he attracted some criticism as a cuckoo candidate unrelated to Vascongadas, back-stage haggling proved effective and Mazarrasa emerged victorious. In the upper chamber he formed a tiny, 2-member Mellista minority. His activity was marginal; the senate archives record only few of his amendments, usually related to discussion on the budget of Ministerio de Fomento. In 1920 the Senate term came to the end and there is nothing known about Mazarrasa's attempts to get his ticket renewed.

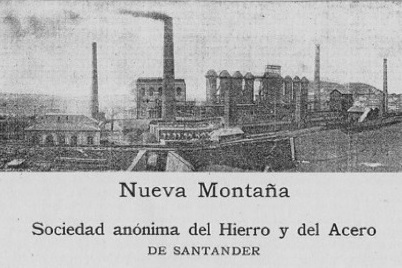
Nueva Montaña facilities

The Mellista party did not materialize and in the early 1920s the movement bogged down in stagnation, fragmentation and disillusionment. Politically Mazarrasa remained on the sidelines and is not listed as taking part in a chaotic sequence of meetings and conferences. At the time he was above all an industrial and financial Cantabrian tycoon; the list of his properties and sources of income, prepared by the notary, contains 77 pages. The key items are his shares in Minas Mazarrasa and Nueva Montaña, though the lead and zinc ore deposits were getting depleted and the mining enterprises were operating on the verge of profitability. However, the family business was diversified and covered also Banco Mercantil, Nueva Argentífera, Sociedad Minas del Carmen, Compañía Azufrera de Hellín y Moratalla and many other; Mazarrasa owned even land on the Fernando Poó island in Spanish Guinea.

== Governor and manager (1924–1940) ==
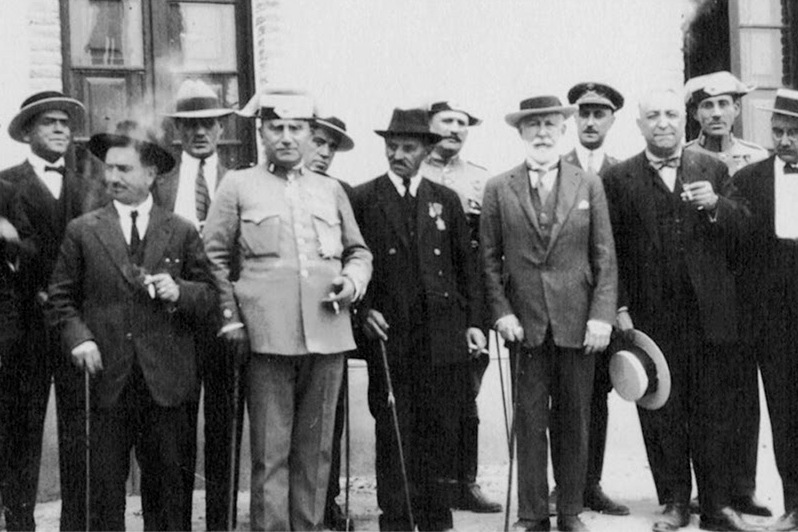
Mazarrasa (front row, white beard) as civil governor, 1927

The 1923 coup of Miguel Primo de Rivera brought political life in the country to a standstill. Most Mellistas at least initially welcomed the new regime, though none of the sources consulted provides information on position adopted by Mazarrasa personally. He was probably highly sympathetic, as in late 1924 the military directorio appointed him gobernador civil of the Segovia province. His term lasted almost 3 years and was not marked by any specific features; both the press and official documents from the mid-1920s dwell mostly on typical administrative work and remain singularly uninformative as to the substance of his term, except engagement in Unión Patriótica and presence at official propaganda rallies. In mid-1927 it was officially declared that Mazarrasa had resigned from the post and that his resignation had been accepted.

In the spring of 1928 Mazarrasa was involved in Monte de Piedad y Caja de Ahorros de Madrid, a traditional financial institution operating as charity pawnbroker and savings bank, at that time largely controlled by state and municipal authorities. Upon death of its manager, Conde de Sepúlveda, and in line with the routine, the board proposed 3 candidates for the position of director-gerente. Mazarrasa was one of them and it was eventually him nominated by the royal decree. He moved to Madrid and assumed the role corresponding to this of CEO; he would remain at the helm of Monte for the following 8 years. The fall of dictatorship and emergence of the republic did not affect his professional position, even though he was already in the retirement age. Mazarrasa managed the institution and represented it in court; by present-day scholars his tenure is viewed as fairly successful. It lasted until September 1936; in revolutionary Madrid the syndicates commenced purge of officials considered potentially disloyal. He was dismissed and replaced by the secretary of Monte.

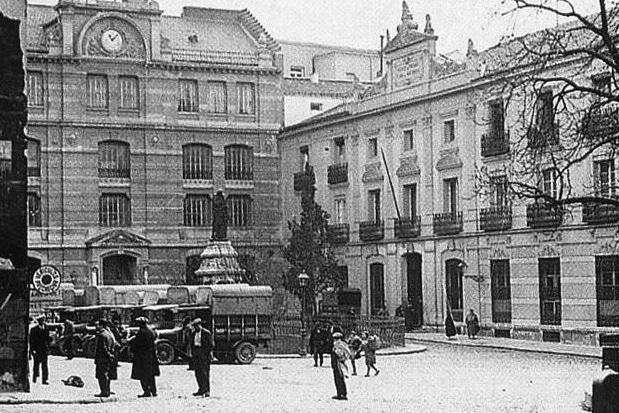
Monte de Piedad HQ, Madrid

As a former Carlist, high dictadura official, business mogul, member of social establishment and known right-winger Mazarrasa was detained by revolutionary militias along with his son, who was later executed. In unclear circumstances he left prison and managed to take refuge in the Mexican embassy, where he lived until the end of the war. In 1939 he lived to see the Nationalist troops entering the city. Already in early April 1939 he was re-appointed director of Monte de Piedad, but his tenure lasted merely a year; in April 1940 he retired. Later that year and in his mid-70s he was fit enough to take part in a public event, related to resumption of Monte de Piedad activities; he was hailed as ex-director. There is no information on his public engagements after the date, and he died the following year.

== See also ==
- Carlism
- Traditionalism (Spain)
- Mellismo

== Footnotes ==
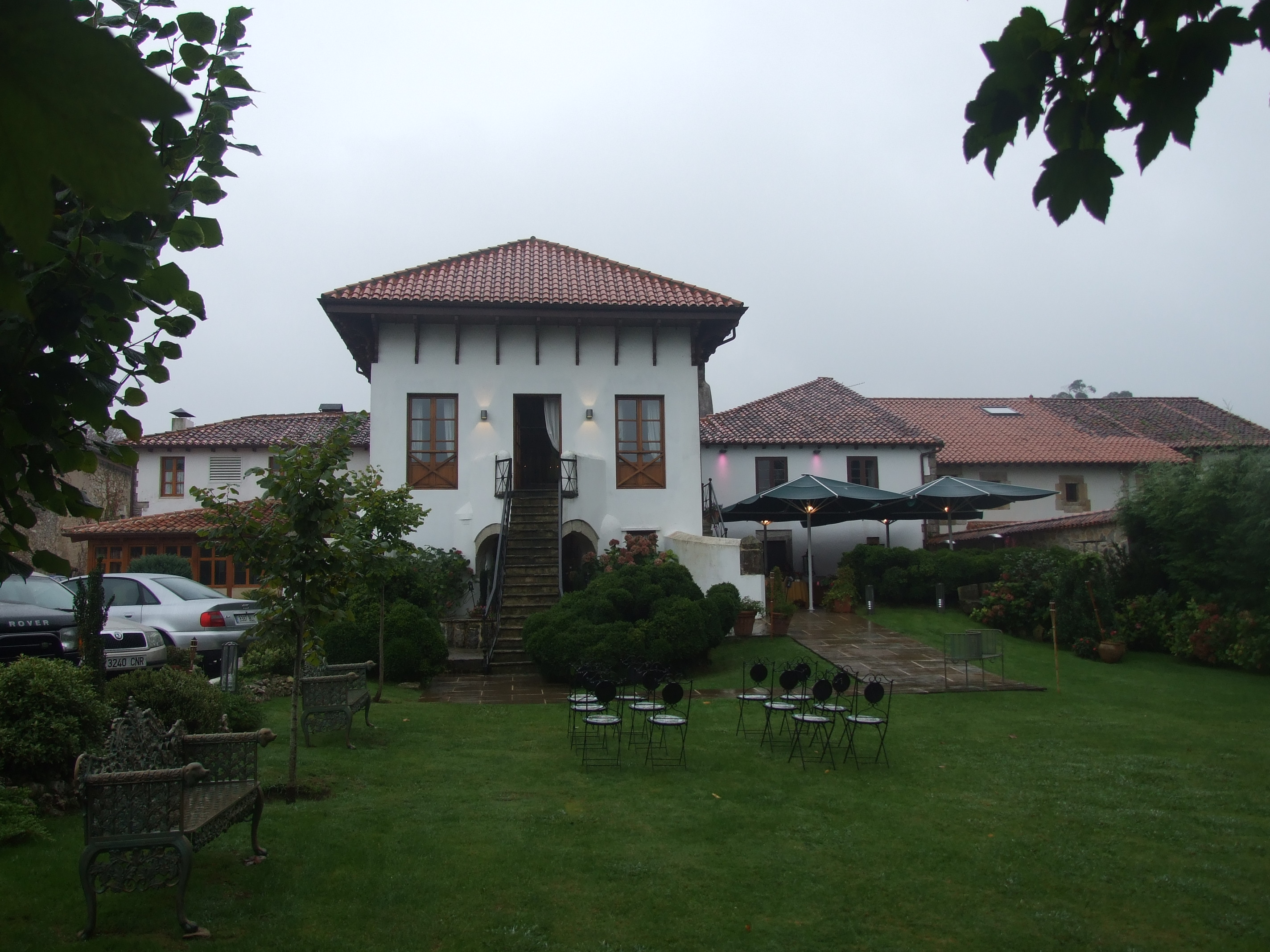
Mazarrasa family residence, Villaverde de Pontones
