= Orduña-Urduña =

Urduña/Orduña
- Municipality
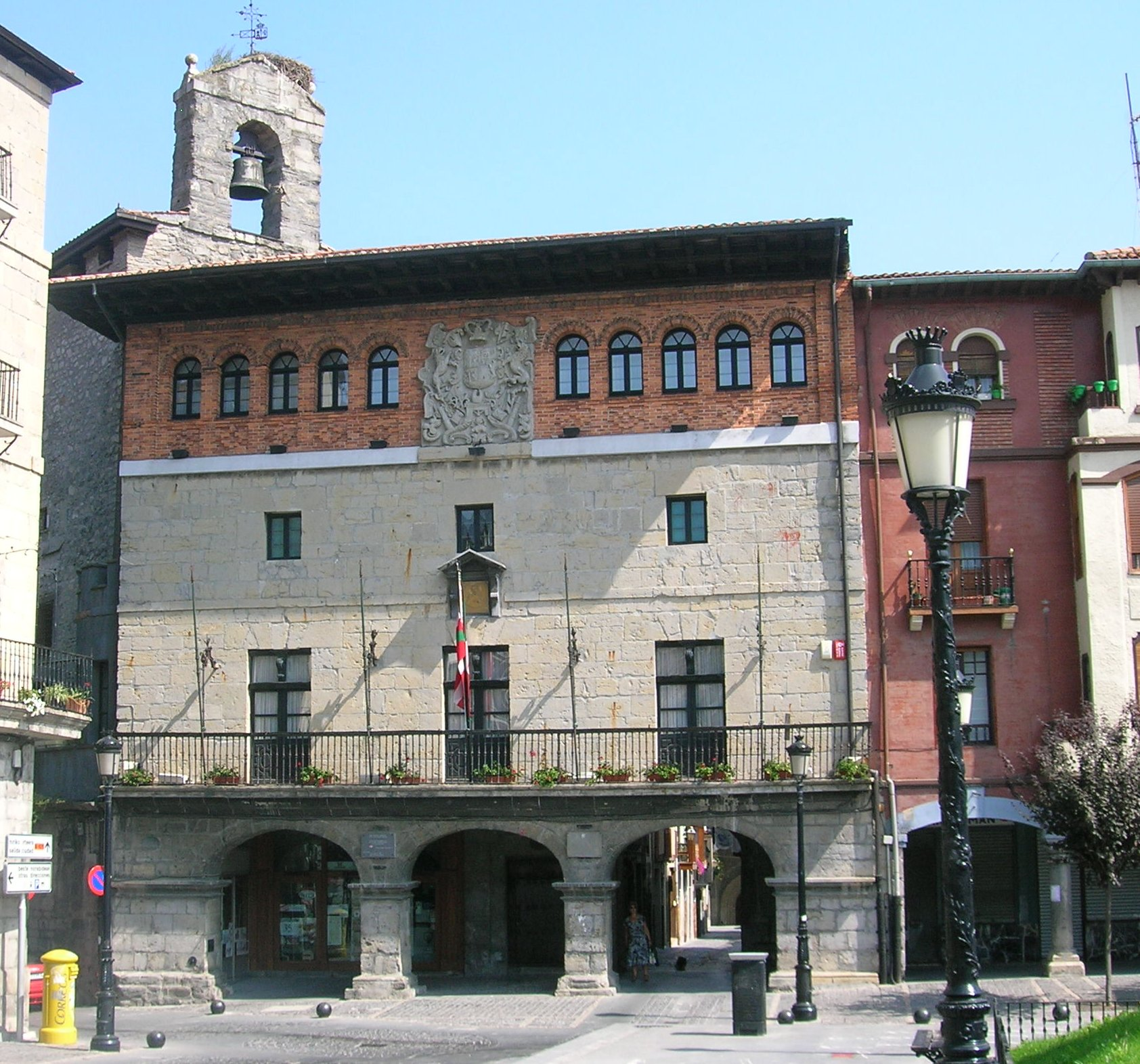
- Urduña/Orduña Town Hall

- Flag Coat of arms
- Interactive map of Urduña/Orduña
- Location of Urduña/Orduña within the Basque Country
- Coordinates: 42°59′45″N 3°00′30″W
- Country: Spain
- Autonomous community: Basque Country
- Province: Biscay
- Comarca: Arratia-Nerbioi
- Founded: 1229

Government
  - Mayor: Idoia Aginako Arbaiza (EH Bildu)

Area
  - Total: 33.49 km^{2} (12.93 sq mi)
- Elevation: 293 m (961 ft)

Population (2025-01-01)
  - Total: 4,247
  - Density: 126.8/km^{2} (328.4/sq mi)
- Demonym: Spanish: orduñés
- Time zone: UTC+1 (CET)
  - Summer (DST): UTC+2 (CEST)
- Postal code: 48460
- Official language(s): Basque; Spanish
- Website: Official website

Urduña/Orduña (Basque: Urduña; Spanish: Orduña) is an exclave and municipality of 4,232 inhabitants located in the province of Biscay, in the autonomous community of Basque Country, in the North of Spain.

== Geography ==
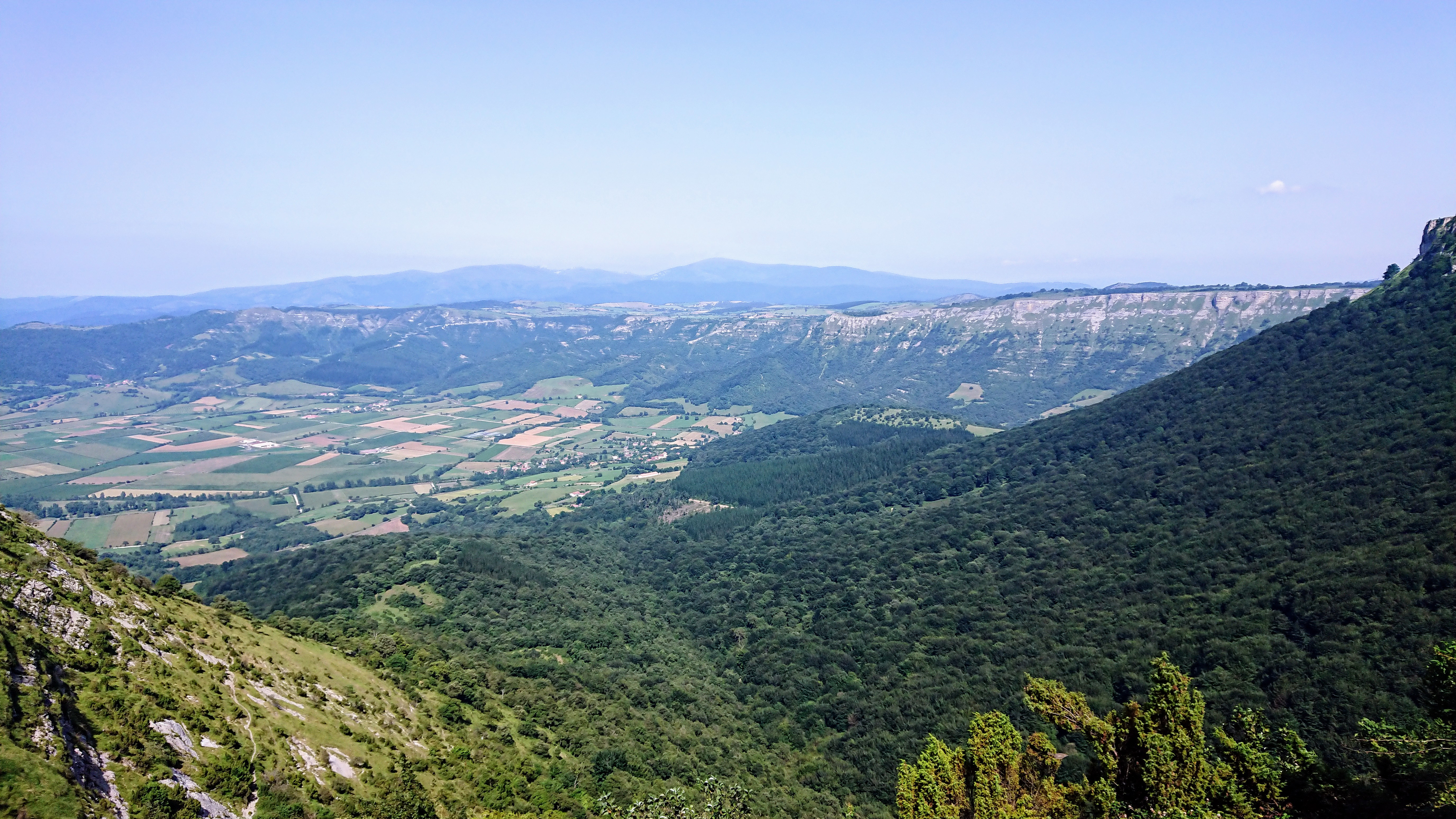
View of the valley of Orduña

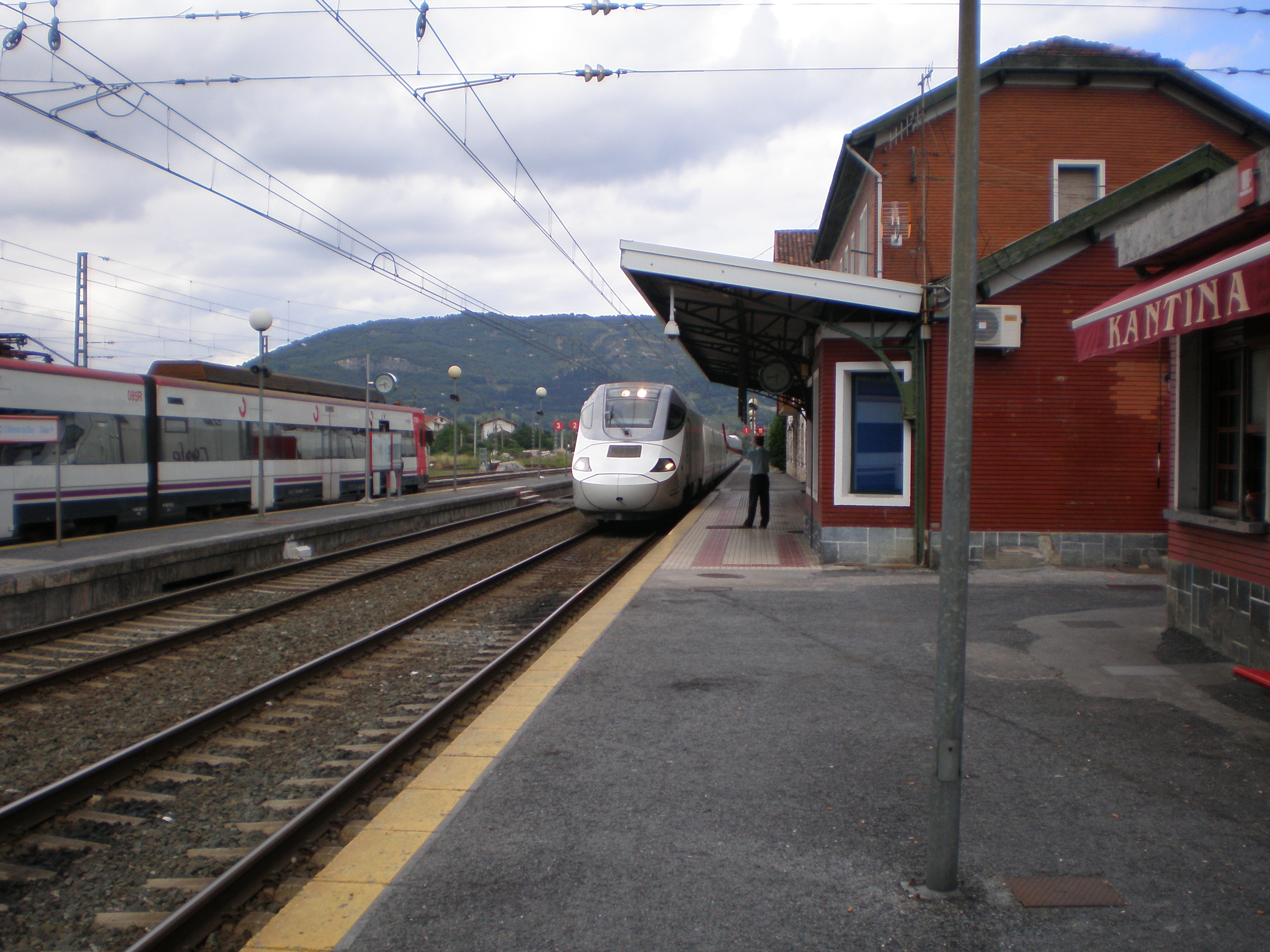
Train station

The municipality is an exclave of Biscay, surrounded entirely by the Basque province of Álava and the province of Burgos, part of Castile and León. It is located in a plain in the highest part of the Nervión river valley, at the foot of the Sierra Salvada mountains. The municipality contains the small exclave of Cerca de Villaño, surrounded by the neighbouring province of Burgos.

Orduña is the final station of the commuter rail line C-3 that links the town with Bilbao.

== Notable people ==
- Juan de Garay (1528–1583), conquistador, governor, founder of Buenos Aires and Santa Fe
- Celestino Alcocer Valderrama (1855-1924), politician, Cortes deputy
- Alberto Alcocer y Ribacoba (1886–1957), politician, mayor of Madrid and secretary general of the Bank of Spain
- Iván Fandiño (1980–2017), bullfighter
- Juan Ortiz de Zárate (1521-1575), conquistador
