= Briviesca =

- Municipality and town
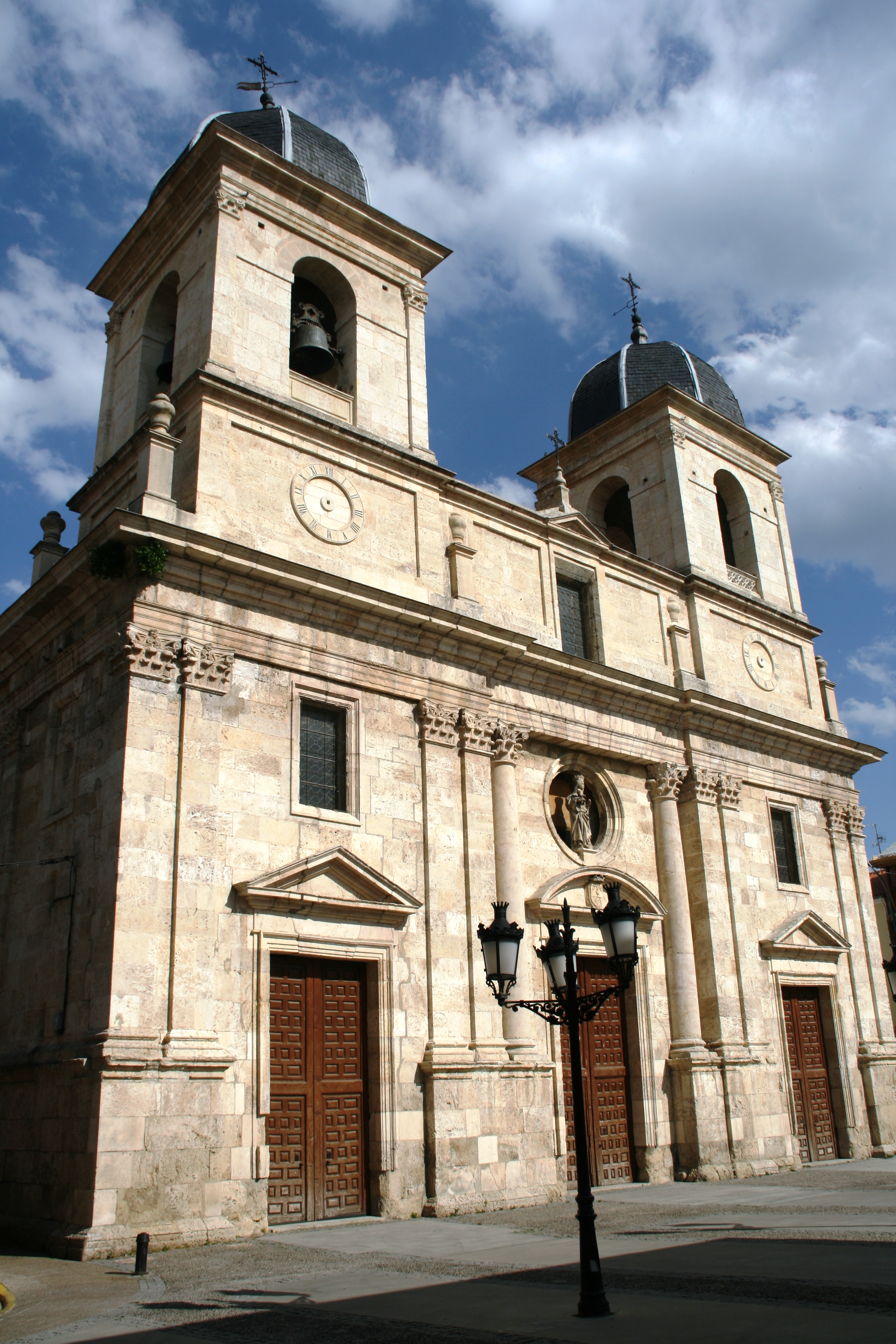
- Santa María church (15th-18th century)

- Flag Coat of arms
- Motto: Capital de La Bureba ("La Bureba's capital")
- Location in Spain. Briviesca (Castile and León) Briviesca (Spain)
- Coordinates: 42°33′00″N 3°19′00″W
- Country: Spain
- Autonomous community: Castile and León
- Province: Burgos
- Comarca: La Bureba

Area
  - Total: 81 km^{2} (31 sq mi)
- Elevation: 726 m (2,382 ft)

Population (2025-01-01)
  - Total: 6,728
  - Density: 83/km^{2} (220/sq mi)
- Time zone: UTC+1 (CET)
  - Summer (DST): UTC+2 (CEST)
- Postal code: 09240
- Website: http://ayto.briviesca.es/

Briviesca is a municipality and a Spanish city located in the north of the Iberian Peninsula, head of the judicial district of Briviesca, capital of the comarca of La Bureba and province of Burgos, autonomous community of Castile and León. According to the demographic data of 2017, the municipality has 6,861 inhabitants, being the 4th most populated in the province. The municipality of Briviesca is made up of five towns: Briviesca (seat or capital), Cameno, Quintanillabón, Revillagodos and Valdazo.

The first settlements date back to the 1st century BC, when the Autrigones, that extended by all the current region of the Bureba and the Upper Ebro valley, established here their capital. Subsequently Briviesca, by then called Virovesca, was already considered an important nucleus of population, where the Romans inhabited in the crossroads of two important Roman roads.

This location, and the boom, in the Middle Ages, of the Camino de Santiago, made Briviesca grow little by little until it reached its maximum splendor in the Renaissance. Nowadays, its location halfway between Miranda de Ebro and Burgos has contributed its industrial and commercial development.

Briviesca has wide green spaces open to fields and mountains, as well as a prominent Monumental Complex with several BICs: the Collegiate Church of Santa María la Mayor; the imposing Monastery of Santa Clara, within there is an important Gothic cloister; the cloister of the "Hospitalillo"; the Plaza Mayor, typical Castilian; its houses and palaces, as well as the Church of San Martín. Close to Briviesca the Santa Casilda's sanctuary is also found.

Briviesca stands out for its large industrial estate "La Vega", in which important industries have been installed since the 70s, although today it is mainly made up of small industries and storage warehouses, especially farm implements, which is the main economic activity, not only of the city, but of the entire region. In the last decades, this has led to Briviesca increasing considerably of population. Nevertheless, due to the economic crisis that started in 2008, this luck was interrupted by losing an average of almost 100 inhabitants per year.

== Name ==
The origin of the name Briviesca is not known exactly, but it seems to be of proto-Indo-European origin and it means "place, head or regional capital" or "center or residence of the chief". This is based on the analysis made of the two elements that seem to conform it: the root uiro- and the suffix -uesca. There are those who believe that it can be derived from Burovio, a god worshiped by the Autrigones. The first document that refers to Briviesca is "Natural History" of the Roman geographer Pliny the Elder, who cites "Virovesca" as the capital of the Autrigones.

== Geographic Location ==
The city of Briviesca is located in the northeast of the province of Burgos, halfway between Burgos and Miranda de Ebro, in the valley that forms the river Oca between the mountains of San José and de los Pinos. This valley opens onto an extensive plain that is La Bureba, in the Autonomous Community of Castilla y León. The Oca River runs throughout much of its layout. Its geographic coordinates are 42 ° 33'00 "N latitude and 03 ° 19'00" W longitude and it is 718 meters above sea level.

Briviesca has not always been located where it does today. The current situation dates from the 14th century. Previously it was located in the nearby mountains, since at that time the defense was the most important. In the fourteenth century and after the purchase of the then Villa by the granddaughter of Alfonso the Wise, Blanca of Portugal decided to move it to the current location mainly because it facilitated better access and therefore better commercial communication.

== Transport ==
=== Road ===
It is located at km 280 of the N-I and on the third exit of the AP-1. It is directly connected with other regional municipalities such as Oña, Poza de la Sal or Frías through a regular bus service; and with the smaller towns through the Transport to Demand, so that they can make their purchases and carry out procedures in Briviesca. It is also directly connected with other Spanish cities such as Irún, San Sebastián, Vitoria or Madrid through a daily bus service that covers the Madrid-Irún line. The Burgos-Logroño line, by Haro, also stops in Briviesca. And of course with the capital of the province Burgos. The city currently has two bus stops, the main one located on Avenida Felix Rodriguez de la Fuente, next to the fire station and the secondary school, and the other one located on Avenida Alberto Alcocer, along with the institute.

Briviesca has also a taxi service that allows you to move around any point of the city as to any surrounding municipality. The stop is located on Calle Medina, near the Plaza Mayor.

=== Railway ===
Briviesca has a railway station, considered of second order, which runs the Madrid-Irún railway line. Although the Madrid-Hendaye line was inaugurated in the middle of the 19th century, it did not have a station until 1902.

Currently, three types of lines stop at the Briviesca station:

- Regional Express: Briviesca joins with cities such as Miranda de Ebro, Zaragoza and Vitoria in a daily train; and also with Valladolid, Burgos and Madrid in two more weekends.
- Arc: It joins Briviesca with Hendaya and with La Coruña with two daily frequencies.
- Intercity: It joins Briviesca with Miranda de Ebro, Vitoria, San Sebastián, Burgos, Valladolid and Irún with six daily frequencies and some less on weekends.

A total of 9 trains a day make Briviesca very well connected by rail although, due to the cuts, it has lost several connections and frequencies. You can get more information about train arrivals and departures in Briviesca on the Adif-stations website.

=== Plane ===
Briviesca is located 30 km from the Burgos Airport, nevertheless, it currently does not have commercial flights.

== Symbols ==
=== Anthem ===
The writing of its letter was entrusted to Fray Justo Pérez de Urbel and the composition of the melody to Rafael Calleja Gómez. Its premiere took place on August 16, 1929. The act was described by all the present as the most emotional and transcendental of the time. Since then, it has become a sign of identity and symbol of the city of Briviesca. Every August 16, the day of San Roque, its interpretation takes place at half past two in the Plaza Mayor. The anthem constitutes the summit event of all the patronal celebrations and, in the last years, the tenor Miguel de Alonso has been the attendant to interpret it in front of six thousand natives and visitors.

=== Shield ===
The current shield of Briviesca, is composed of three elements. In the upper strip, on a red background, three heads, two of inclined Moors and one of a Christian, horizontal, which would be explained as a sign of coexistence between cultures; in the center, also on a red background, three parallel strips of gold, which would allude to the streets of Briviesca and its straightness; at the lower end, water waves that would remit to the Oca river; and adorning the shield, a mural crown of gold.

=== Flag ===
The current flag of Briviesca has been recently created, it has not been the result of a study or municipal agreement. As mayor Antonio López-Linares, it was considered advisable to provide the city with a flag that could be hoisted at the local festivities. To do this, an old tapestry was used, which on moss green was the city's coat of arms.

== History ==
=== The origins of Briviesca and La Bureba ===
Although the existing prehistoric information in this zone is scarce, several deposits have been found that allow to assure the human presence from the Paleolithic, with remains of importance in the caves of Penches, La Blanca and El Caballón, all of them close to Oña. Later, from the Iron Age testify the vestiges found in Briviesca, Miraveche, Pancorbo, Poza de la Sal, Soto de Bureba and Villanueva de Teba.

The Autrigones

The Autrigones were one of the pre-Roman peoples who settled in the Iberian Peninsula. From the 3rd century BC, the Autrigones occupied a large area of land around this upper area of the Ebro Valley. Virovesca was mentioned for the first time in 77 AD. Other Autrigon settlements were located nearby, such as Salionca (Poza de la Sal), Segisamunculum (Cerezo de Río Tirón), Vindeleia (Cubo de Bureba), and the aforementioned Tritium (Monasterio de Rodilla).

Jewish History

A Jewish community once was present in Briviesca, with he first documentation of Jewish presence dating to 1240. The Jews in Briviesca suffered from various problems, such as anti-Jewish legislation and the consequences of war. The community existed until the 1492 expulsion of the Jews.

== Demography ==
Briviesca had a continuous growth due to the boom in housing construction caused by the housing bubble that attracted a lot of foreign population, multiplying the presence in the city by seven in just ten years. In that time, Briviesca reached an historic maximum population of 7937 inhabitants in 2009. Nevertheless, due to the economic crisis, a recession in the census has happened due to the return to their place of origin of many of these immigrants. Even so, Briviesca is still the fourth most important city in the province after Burgos, Miranda de Ebro and Aranda de Duero.

The 15% of the population registered in Briviesca is foreign and comes from 40 different countries, according to the last rectification of the register made by the City Council. On January 1, 2016, the population of the municipality amounted to 6,948.

=== Population by Nucleus ===
Briviesca is the capital of the municipality formed by five residential nuclei. It has been the growth of the largest, Briviesca, which has included the four others inside the municipality. Thus Briviesca, properly speaking, consists of the city of Briviesca and two neighbourhoods, both located to the north: Cameno, on the other side of the Oca; and Quintanillabón. Both cores are located at a distance of four kilometers from the urban center. The municipality also owns two Minor Local Entities, Valdazo and Revillagodos, both located to the southwest, the first one to five kilometers and the second to ten kilometers.

== Administration ==
=== Local Administration ===
Álvaro Morales (PSOE) is the mayor of the City of Briviesca since June 15, 2019; getting four of thirteen councilors. The City Council is composed of thirteen councilors distributed as follows: 4 (PP), 4 (PSOE) 3 (Assembly Briviesca) and 2 (Citizens). When no political party obtained an absolute majority, AB supported the inauguration of Álvaro Morales as mayor, signing a governmental pact. The administration of the city is carried out from the Consistorial House located in Santa María Street, which was remodeled in 2008, and it houses the Historical Municipal Archive of Briviesca, the Local Police dependencies, the information and tourism office, registers, information, population register, Plenary Hall, committee room, secretariat, treasury, municipal offices and other offices and dependencies.

=== Judicial Administration ===
Briviesca is the seat of the Judicial District of Briviesca and has a Court of First Instance and Instruction. The court opened on June 27, 2013, and is located at the corner of Pedro Ruiz Street and Santa Ana al Rio. The space houses the single Court of First Instance and Instruction, courtroom, Registry, Civil Registry, common units, medical-forensic clinic, area of detainees and archives.

== Economy ==
The region of La Bureba and therefore, Briviesca, are located in an area of high cereal production, being the wheat and the straw of it, its almost exclusive crop, along with others with less presence of legumes and sunflower to promote crop rotation and avoid the depletion of the land. Briviesca has as well an industrial estate called "La Vega", where there are small and medium-sized companies, and some large multinational companies. The production of food products, textiles, metal, cereal and flour stores, materials for construction and all kinds of workshops on a smaller scale stand out.

=== Primary Sector ===
- Agriculture

Briviesca has the largest cultivated area of Castilla y León and one of the largest in Spain. That is why in many cases La Bureba is considered the granary of Castilla. In Briviesca it is the main economic activity. In the region more than 40,000 hectares of land are cultivated. The cereal is mainly cultivated because this zone has the optimum climate for this type of crop, which occupies 30,000 hectares. The sunflower (8,000 hectares) and other crops such as peas, soybeans, or even opium are also cultivated to a great extent, although the latter has extreme vigilance, control and protection.

- Livestock

In La Bureba in general, and in Briviesca in particular, there are small sheep and pig herds. Intensive livestock is practiced, since there are practically no pastures. These cattle are mainly dedicated to consumption. To a lesser extent there are cattle ranches for milk production.

=== Secondary Sector ===
Briviesca is also an important industrial center since the first companies were installed in the 70s in "La Vega" industrial estate, which has already been expanded three times and occupies a total area of 1,000,000 m². Due to the economic crisis, the last expansion and the largest one is waiting to be occupied by companies. The majority of those located in La Vega are local SMEs and warehouses for agricultural machinery. The multinationals Siro and Acciona, which has the second biomass plant in Spain, are also located there. For production, the food stands out, followed by mechanics. The situation of Briviesca, along with two main corridors (N-1 and AP-1), has favoured its industrial development.

=== Tertiary Sector ===
Briviesca does not stand out in this sense, although it is necessary to emphasize that it is the commercial and financial center of the region. The main Savings and Banks and the big supermarkets are located in Briviesca. It also has a large commercial fabric of small stores and it is the hotel center since it has more than 200 hotel rooms spread over four and two star hotels and hostels. It also has traditional restaurants and fast food as well as more than forty bars. Briviesca can also be considered a 'touristic city' since it receives around 40,000 visitors per year.

== Festivities ==
=== Carnivals ===
The carnivals begin with the celebration known in Briviesca as "the day of the Choricillo" in which it is a tradition that, to face the meat fast on Fridays of Lent, friends hang out in the afternoon to have a snack. The chorizo is the protagonist of the table, as well as other sausages and the typical blood sausage of Briviesca.

Carnivals, properly speaking, do not have much popularity, but there is usually a parade and a carnival on Saturday that attracts people from nearby towns in the region, as well as other activities during the four main days. It is an habit for people to disguise themselves in groups of friends. On the Tuesday of Carnival, the "burial of the sardine" is celebrated. It is tradition to make a mourning parade through the streets of the city to take the sardine to one of the bridges in which it is burned, and then the ashes are thrown to the Oca River. After this, a chocolate is distributed among the participants.

=== Couples' Fair ===
It is celebrated, depending on the calendar, on Saint Joseph's Day if it is a public holiday (March 19) or on the nearest weekend. It is a particular tradition from Briviesca which began in the 20th century. Over time, the modernization of the field caused this tradition to stop being celebrated. However, in the 1970s, the city wanted to recover this custom by changing it completely in format, and that is where the current bride and groom fair was born. During the act, the queens of the patron saint's parties distribute a carnation to the woman and a bag of almonds to the man who forms the couple. With time, in addition to this act, which is the central one, they began to organize festivals and concerts being today a totally festive day to which other sporting and cultural musical acts have been added.

=== Easter ===
It begins with the acts prior to the big week in Lent: confessions, talks, Way of the Cross, performances... On Friday of Sorrows, after the afternoon mass, the official opening is celebrated, with the proclamation and the imposition of medals to the new confreres. On Palm Sunday, after the blessing of the palms in the Church of Santa Clara, the Procession of the Palms is celebrated with the passage "Entrance to Jerusalem". Afterwards, a mass is celebrated.

On Tuesday of Holy Week, after the afternoon mass, a Penitential Way of the Cross is celebrated through the streets of the city with three processions: "The Nazarene", "The Holy Christ of the Atonement", and "The Solitude of Our Lady", followed by the Bugle and Drum Band, created in 2012. After the mass, concerts, and the vigil of Holy Thursday, a Via-Crucis is celebrated on Good Friday morning in which the "Penitential Cross", six metres long, two metres wide and 160 kg, is carried up to the 'Monte de Los Pinos' as if it were the Mount of Calvary. The descent of the Cross is represented. In the afternoon, the 'Santos Oficios' are celebrated and, at night, the maximum expression of the Holy Week takes place; the 'Santo Entierro' Procession. It is the most spectacular and multitudinous one. Thirteen floats and around three hundred brothers in the habit parade: "Prayer in the Garden", "Flagellation of the Lord", "Ecce Homo", "Penitential Cross", "The Nazarene", "The Veronica", "Elevation of the Cross", "Holy Christ of the Atonement", "The Descent", "The Pietà", "Santo Sepulcro", "Apóstol San Juan" and "La Dolorosa" accompanied by the Municipal Music Band, the Bugle and Drum Band of the Holy Confraternity of the Vera-Cruz, and various civil and ecclesiastical authorities. In this procession the silence broken by the music is the main characteristic, as well as the parade that takes place in the Plaza Mayor to interpret Schubert's Ave Maria. It ends with the singing of the Salve Popular and the transfer of the 'Santo Sepulcro' to the Church of San Martín.

On Holy Saturday the Rosary of the Dawn is celebrated in the Procession of the Solitude accompanying "La Dolorosa" and ends with the Easter Sunday and the Procession of the Meeting in which "Jesus Risen" and his "Holy Mother" parade.

All these events are organized by a single brotherhood with about six hundred members, founded in 1664- Briviesca's Holy Week, due to its history and its own characteristics, is in the process of being qualified as a "Festival of Regional Tourist Interest". In the year 2014 the Brotherhood that organizes it turned 350 years and organized diverse acts to commemorate such an important event. You can get more information at its website.

=== Pilgrimage and day of Saint Casilda ===
Saint Casilda's Day is celebrated on May 9, local holiday in Briviesca. The Saint has been considered the patron saint of the city since 1600 and the protector of La Bureba, which has a lot of devotion and affection for her.

The history of this Saint is very particular. She was the daughter of a Muslim king in Toledo and, according to the legend, she helped and brought bread to her father's prisoners. One day he followed her and asked her to show him what she was hiding in her dress. Casilda said they were roses and, at that moment the miracle occurred. Bread turned into flowers. The story does not end there. Casilda became ill and it came to her attention that in La Bureba, in the Kingdom of Castile, there were some lakes with curative properties, the Lakes of San Vicente. Casilda asked permission to go to her father and he granted it to her. Once healthy, Casilda stayed in the caves that exist in that place to retire. At present, the Sanctuary of Saint Casilda exists in that area, a centre of pilgrimage for Briviescans and for anyone who wants to be cured of any illness in thelakes.

The current festival has been celebrated since 1486, in view of the plague epidemic that was devastating Spain at that moment. The people of Briviesca told the Saint that, if she freed them from the plague, they would celebrate the festival every year. And so it was done. Up to this year, the day is used to celebrate masses, processions, open-air dances and other cultural events, apart from paying homage to different personalities.

Before the day of the saint, the pilgrimage to the Sanctuary is celebrated on the first Sunday of May. This pilgrimage has been organized by the "Los Deseperaos" crag for 33 years. It starts from the main square in Briviesca, walking along the road that leads to the sanctuary for about ten kilometers. Once there, a procession is held around the sanctuary and a Castilian mass is celebrated to later venerate Casilda's relic. Afterwards, a picnic is held in the fields of the Sanctuary. In the afternoon, the pilgrimage descends to Briviesca and some popular dances are performed by the same group that livens up the mass. This pilgrimage has been celebrated uninterrupted since 1734, as documents from the Municipal Archive of the City of Briviesca show.

== Notable people ==
- Celestino Alcocer Valderrama (1855-1924), politician
