= Alberto Alcocer y Ribacoba =

Spanish politician

Alberto Alcocer y Ribacoba (1886–1957) was a Spanish politician.

Born in Orduña, Biscay, he was son to Celestino Alcocer y Valderrama (1855–1924), the Carlist politician, Cortes deputy in 1907 and 1910, and the Carlist jefe for Old Castille. Alcocer y Ribacoba served as mayor of Madrid on two occasions: from 1923 to 1924 and from 1939 to 1946. A Doctor in Law he was awarded the Gold medal of Madrid in 1946. In 1949 he was named the Secretary General of the Bank of Spain.

He died on 30 of May 1957. His son Luis de Alcocer Colored, was a decorated pilot who was awarded a medal for his role in the Spanish Civil War in 1936 but died on 3 October 1941 in a Russian confrontation. Alberto Alcocer y Ribacoba is the grandfather of "The Albertos" the industrialists Alberto Alcocer and Alberto Cortina. A street in Madrid was named after him in 1954.
