= Valle de Losa =

Coordinates: 42°59′12″N 3°13′09″W

- municipality
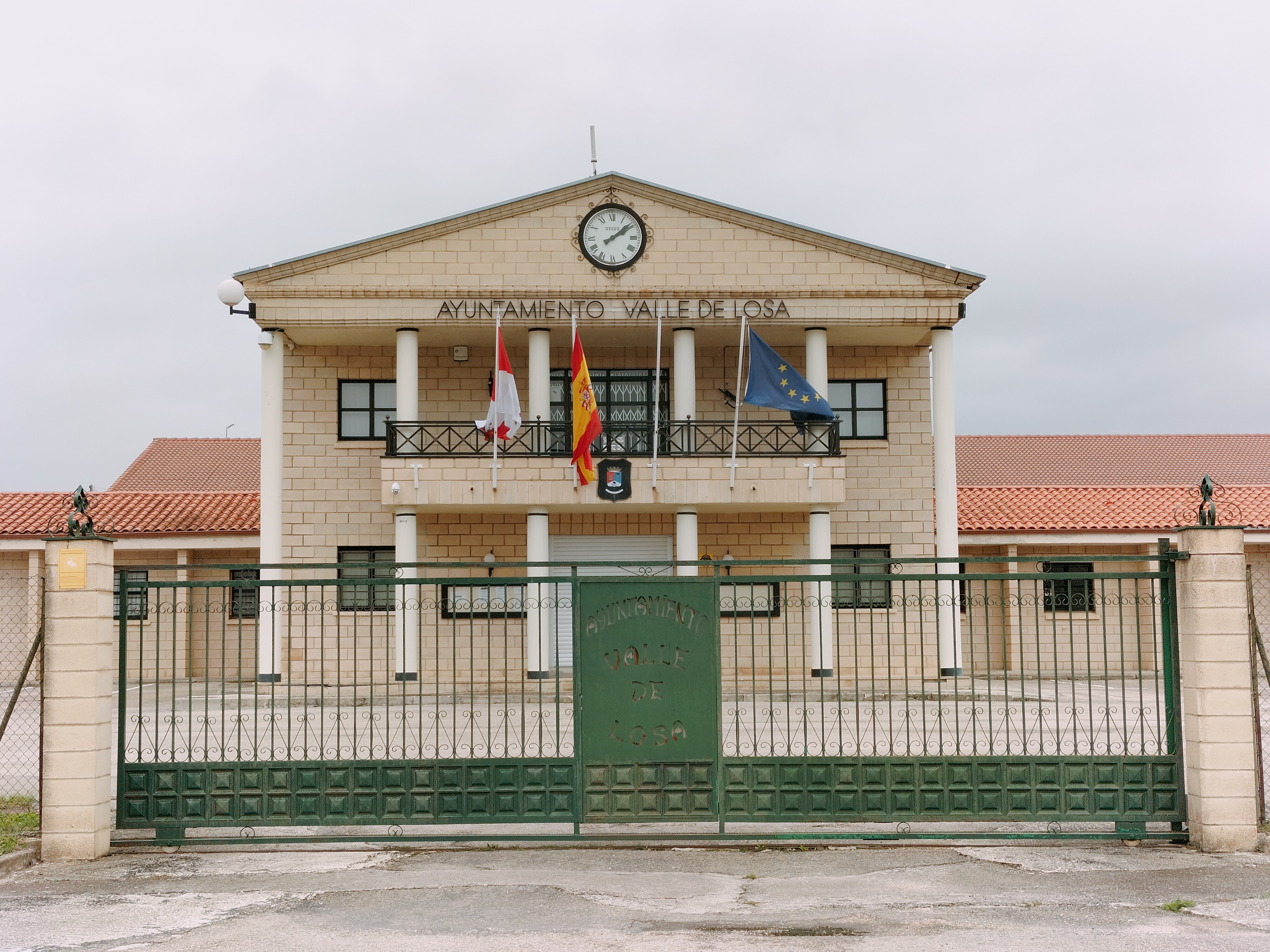
- Town hall

- Flag Coat of arms
- Interactive map of Valle de Losa
- Country: Spain
- Autonomous community: Castile and León
- Province: Burgos

Area
  - Total: 226 km^{2} (87 sq mi)

Population (2025-01-01)
  - Total: 486
  - Density: 2.15/km^{2} (5.57/sq mi)
- Time zone: UTC+1 (CET)
  - Summer (DST): UTC+2 (CEST)

Valle de Losa is a municipality located in the province of Burgos, Castile and León, Spain. According to the 2004 census (INE), the municipality has a population of 621 inhabitants.
