= Bartolomé Feliú =

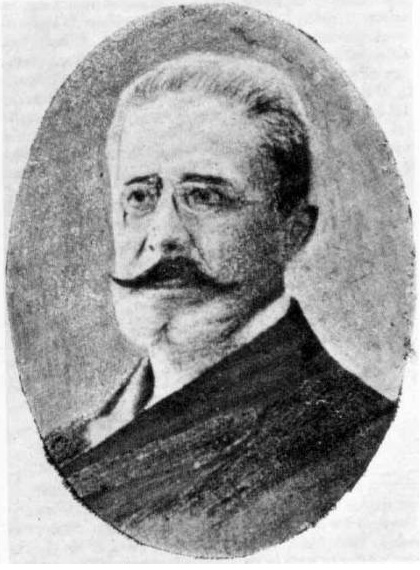

Member of the Congress of Deputies
- In office 26 April 1907 – 2 January 1914
- Constituency: Tafalla

Personal details
- Born: Bartolomé Feliú y Pérez; 1843 Peralta, Spain
- Died: 1918 (aged 74–75) Zaragoza, Spain
- Party: Traditionalist Communion
- Education: University of Barcelona; University of Zaragoza
- Occupation: Scientist, professor

Bartolomé Feliú y Pérez (1843 – 1918) was a Spanish politician, scientist and professor. He was a member of the Traditionalist Communion, of which he was delegate head between 1909 and 1912.

During 5 years he studied in Seminario de Pamplona, where he obtained the title of meritissimus. Then he received secondary education in the Institutos of Pamplona and Huesca, rewarded with getting sobresaliente marks and getting the baccalaureate. In Salamanca he got the title of preceptor en humanidades. At the University of Barcelona he entered the faculty of Ciencias, having completed the curriculum with licenciatura, while in Central in Madrid he received the doctorado. In 1870 he emerged successful from competitive exams for cátedra de física in the Instituto of Teruel; in 1875 he moved to the parallel post in Toledo, and in 1880 assumed cátedra de física superior in the Universidad de Barcelona. In 1896 he moved to the Universidad de Zaragoza.
