= Desi Arnaz =

Cuban-American musician, actor, producer and television studio head (1917–1986)

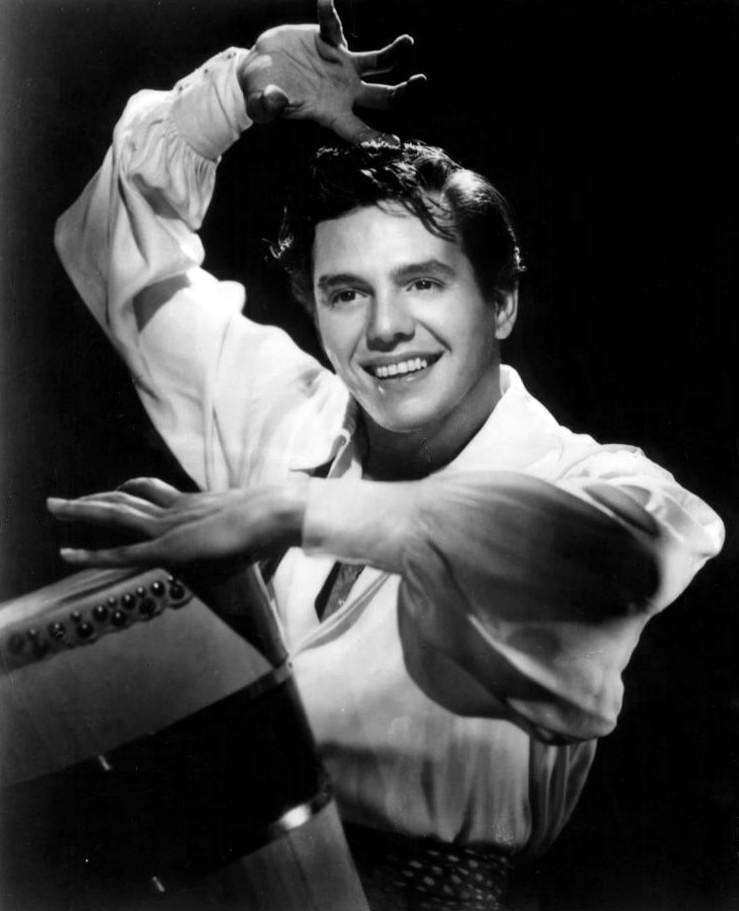
- Arnaz in 1938
- Born: Desiderio Alberto Arnaz y de Acha III; March 2, 1917; Santiago de Cuba, Cuba
- Died: December 2, 1986 (aged 69); Del Mar, California, U.S.
- Occupations: Actor; musician/bandleader; studio executive; comedian; producer
- Years active: 1934–1983
- Political party: Republican
- Spouses: Lucille Ball (m. 1940; div. 1960); Edith Mack Hirsch (m. 1963; died 1985)
- Children: Lucie Arnaz; Desi Arnaz Jr.
- Parent: Desiderio Alberto Arnaz y de Alberni II
- Military career
- Allegiance: United States
- Branch: United States Army
- Service years: 1943–1945
- Rank: Staff sergeant
- Unit: 9th Service Command
- War: World War II

Desiderio Alberto Arnaz y de Acha III (March 2, 1917 – December 2, 1986), known as Desi Arnaz, was a Cuban-American actor, musician, producer, and bandleader. Born in Santiago de Cuba, he fled with his family to Miami after the Cuban Revolution of 1933. He played Ricky Ricardo on the American television sitcom I Love Lucy, in which he co-starred with his wife Lucille Ball. Arnaz and Ball are credited as the innovators of the syndicated rerun, which they pioneered with the I Love Lucy series.

Arnaz and Lucille Ball co-founded and ran the television production company Desilu Productions, originally to market I Love Lucy to television networks. After I Love Lucy ended, Arnaz went on to produce several other television series, at first with Desilu Productions, and later independently, including The Ann Sothern Show and The Untouchables. He was also the bandleader of his Latin group, the Desi Arnaz Orchestra. He was known for playing conga drums and popularized the conga line in the United States.

== Early life ==
Arnaz was born in Santiago de Cuba, Cuba, to Desiderio Alberto Arnaz y de Alberni II (March 8, 1894 – May 31, 1973) and Dolores "Lolita" de Acha y de Socias (April 2, 1896 – October 24, 1988). His father, a medical doctor trained in the United States, was Santiago's youngest mayor and also served in the Cuban House of Representatives. His maternal grandfather was Alberto de Acha, an executive at rum producer Bacardi & Co. In his memoir, Arnaz states his ancestors Don Manuel and Ventura were given land grants in California, areas in Ventura County, Beverly Hills and the Wilshire district in Los Angeles by Queen Isabella II of Spain. Arnaz was of Spanish, Irish and French descent.

A descendant of Cuban nobility, Arnaz was a great-great-great-grandson of José Joaquín, a mayor of Santiago de Cuba. The Cuban Revolution of 1933 forced Arnaz and his family to lose everything and flee Cuba. A mob attacked and destroyed the family's houses, property, and livestock. Arnaz narrowly escaped the attack because he was able to hop in a car driving away. His father, Alberto Arnaz, was jailed and all of his property was confiscated. He was released after six months when his father-in-law, Alberto de Acha, intervened on his behalf.

The family then fled to Miami, where Desi attended school. One of his classmates was Albert "Sonny" Capone, the only child of Chicago mobster Al Capone. Desi initially lived in Miami with only his father, with his mother coming to the United States at a later date and the parents divorcing in the time afterwards. Arnaz's family came to the U.S. with no money and he had to live with his father in a garage that was infested with rats and roaches. In the summer of 1934, Arnaz attended Saint Leo Prep (near Tampa) to improve his English. His first jobs included working at Woolworth's and cleaning canary cages in Miami. He then went into the tile business with his father before turning to show business full time.

== Professional career ==
=== Musician and actor ===
After finishing high school, Arnaz joined a band, the Siboney Septet, and began making a name for himself in Miami. Xavier Cugat, after seeing Arnaz perform, hired him for his touring orchestra, playing the conga drum and singing. Becoming a star attraction encouraged him to start his own band, the Desi Arnaz Orchestra.

Arnaz and his orchestra became a hit in New York City's club scene, including a club named La Conga, where he is credited with introducing the concept of conga line dancing to the United States.

He came to the attention of Rodgers and Hart who, in 1939, cast him in their Broadway musical Too Many Girls. The show was a hit and RKO Pictures bought the movie rights.

Arnaz went to Hollywood the next year to appear in the show's movie version at RKO, which also starred Lucille Ball. Arnaz and Ball fell in love during the film's production and eloped on November 30, 1940.

Arnaz appeared in several movies in the 1940s such as Bataan, starring Robert Taylor (1943). Arnaz's portrayal of Felix Ramirez, the jive-loving California National Guardsman, was described by New York Times critic Bosley Crowther as one of several supporting players who were "convincing in soldier roles".

=== Military service ===
On April 27, 1943, Arnaz received his draft notice as a foreign national since he was a citizen of Cuba at the time. Later that year he became a naturalized US Citizen and changed his legal name to Desi Arnaz. However, Arnaz was disqualified from overseas service due to hypertension and knee injuries, which caused him pain with prolonged physical exertion, according to his military physical examination. He had injured his left knee prior to his enlistment and injured his right knee soon after enlisting on May 23, 1943, during a baseball game at Camp Arlington. He completed his recruit training, but was classified for limited service in the United States Army during World War II.

He was assigned to direct United Service Organization (USO) programs at the Birmingham General Army Hospital in the San Fernando Valley. It was his responsibility to keep injured soldiers entertained while they recovered in the hospital. Thanks to his Hollywood connections, Arnaz was able to bring celebrities to visit the hospital and boost morale of the soldiers. For example, upon discovering the first thing the wounded soldiers requested was a glass of cold milk, he arranged for movie starlets to meet them and pour the milk for them.

Arnaz served two years, seven months and four days. His primary unit was the 9th Service Command, Army Service Forces. For his service during World War II, he was awarded the Army Good Conduct Medal, the American Campaign Medal, and the World War II Victory Medal.

Arnaz was discharged as a staff sergeant on September 30, 1945.

=== Career post-military ===
On December 1, 1945, Arnaz formed another orchestra, which was successful in live appearances and recordings. He sang for troops in Birmingham Hospital with John Macchia and hired his childhood friend Marco Rizo to play piano and arrange for the orchestra. For the 1946–47 season, Arnaz was the bandleader, conducting his Desi Arnaz Orchestra, on Bob Hope's radio show (The Pepsodent Show) on NBC.

In 1951, Arnaz was given a game show on CBS Radio, Your Tropical Trip to entice Arnaz and Ball to stay at CBS over a competing offer from NBC, and to keep Arnaz and his band employed and in Hollywood, rather than touring. The musical game show, hosted by Arnaz and featuring Arnaz's orchestra, had audience members competing for a Caribbean vacation. The program aired from January 1951 until September, shortly before the premiere of I Love Lucy in October.

When he became successful in television, he kept the orchestra on his payroll, and Rizo arranged and orchestrated the music for I Love Lucy.

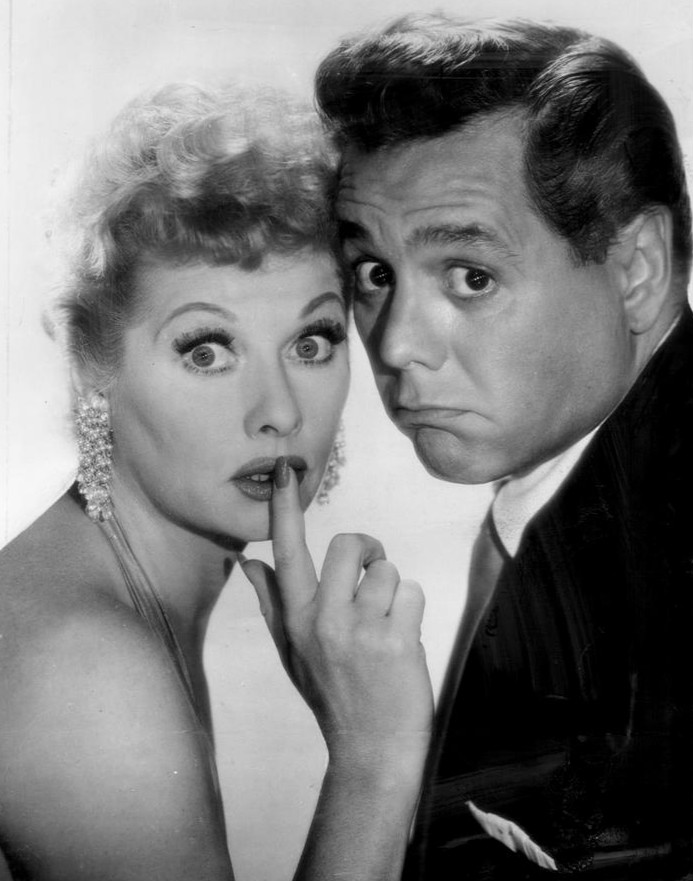
Lucille Ball and Arnaz, 1957

=== I Love Lucy ===
On October 15, 1951, Arnaz co-starred in the premiere of I Love Lucy, in which he played a fictionalized version of himself, Cuban orchestra leader Enrique "Ricky" Ricardo. His co-star was his real-life wife, Lucille Ball, who played Ricky's wife, Lucy. Television executives had been pursuing Ball to adapt her very popular radio series My Favorite Husband for television. Ball insisted on Arnaz playing her on-air spouse so the two would be able to spend more time together. CBS wanted Ball's Husband co-star Richard Denning.

The original premise was for the couple to portray Lucy and Larry Lopez, a successful show business couple whose glamorous careers interfered with their efforts to maintain a normal marriage. Market research indicated, however, that this scenario would not be popular, so Jess Oppenheimer changed it to make Ricky Ricardo a struggling young orchestra leader and Lucy an ordinary housewife who had show business fantasies but no talent. The character name "Larry Lopez" was dropped because of a real-life bandleader named Vincent Lopez, and was replaced with "Ricky Ricardo". The name was inspired by Henry Richard, a family friend and the brother of P.C. Richard of P.C. Richard & Son. This name translates to Enrique Ricardo. Ricky often appeared at, and later owned, the Tropicana Club, which under his ownership he renamed Club Babalu.

Initially, the idea of having Ball and the distinctly Latin American Arnaz portray a married couple encountered resistance as they were told that Desi's Cuban accent and Latin style would not be agreeable to American viewers. The couple overcame these objections, however, by touring together, during the summer of 1950, in a live vaudeville act they developed with the help of Spanish clown Pepito Pérez, together with Ball's radio show writers. Much of the material from their vaudeville act, including Lucy's memorable seal routine, was used in the pilot episode of I Love Lucy. Segments of the pilot were recreated in the sixth episode of the show's first season. During his time on the show, Arnaz and Ball became TV's most successful entrepreneurs.

=== Desilu Productions ===
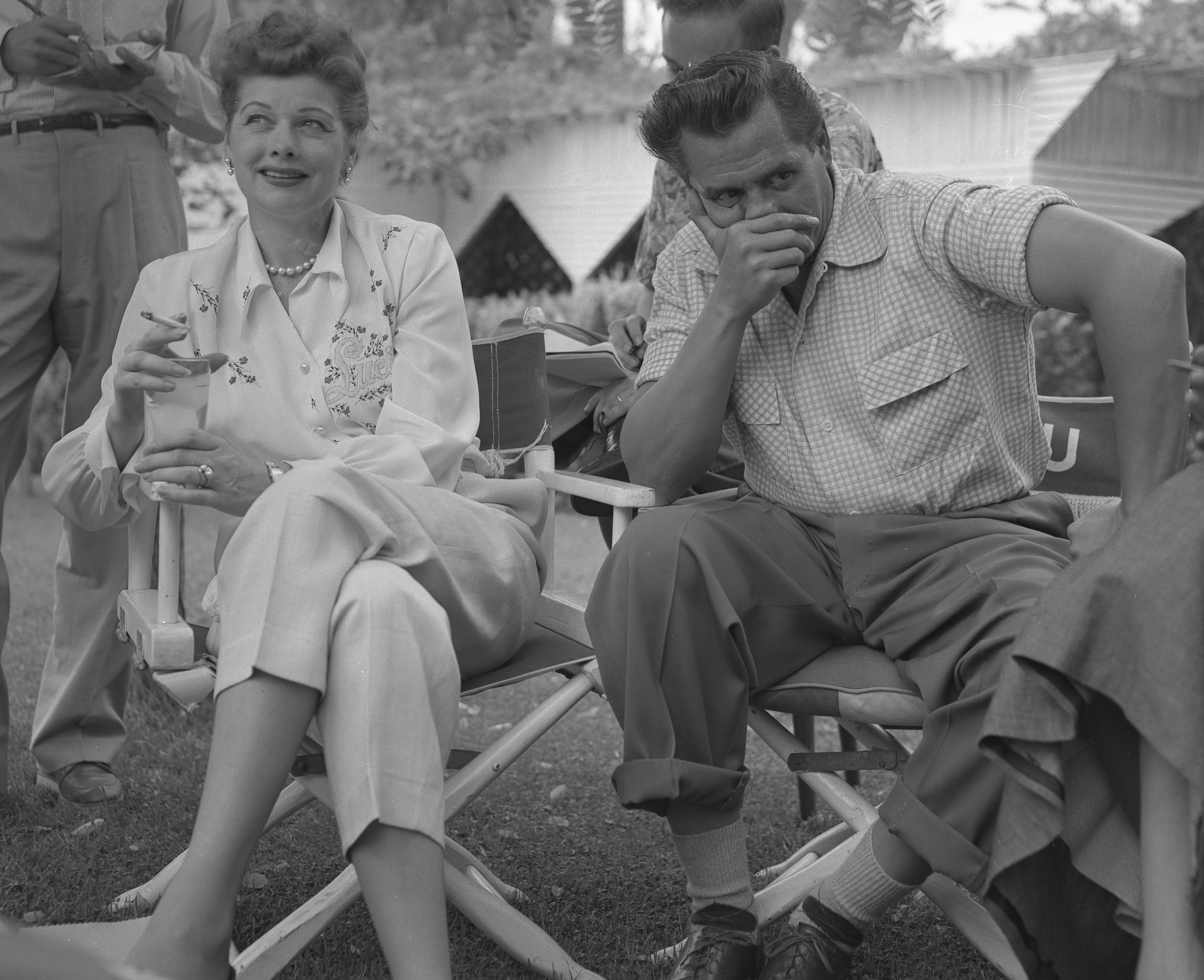
Lucille Ball and Arnaz in Los Angeles, 1953

With Ball, Arnaz founded Desilu Productions in 1950, initially to produce the vaudeville-style touring act that led to I Love Lucy. At that time, most television programs were broadcast live, and as the largest markets were in New York, the rest of the country received only kinescope images. Karl Freund, Arnaz's cameraman, and even Arnaz himself have been credited with the development of the multiple-camera setup production style using adjacent sets in front of a live audience that became the standard for subsequent situation comedies. The use of film enabled every station around the country to broadcast high-quality images of the show. Arnaz was told that it would be impossible to allow an audience onto a sound stage, but he worked with Freund to design a set that would accommodate an audience, allow filming, and adhere to fire and safety codes. Due to the expense of 35mm film, Arnaz and Ball agreed to salary cuts. In return, they retained the rights to the films. This was the basis for their invention of re-runs and syndicating TV shows (a huge source of new revenue).

In addition to I Love Lucy, he executive produced The Ann Sothern Show and Those Whiting Girls (starring Margaret Whiting and Barbara Whiting), and was involved in several other series such as The Untouchables, Whirlybirds, and Sheriff of Cochise / United States Marshal. While he was producing The Untouchables, Arnaz was allegedly the target of a mafia murder plot, which was later called off, due to the show's negative publicity of gangsters. These allegations were made in the 1980s by Jimmy Fratianno in his book, The Last Mafioso, although they were rejected by Arnaz. He also produced the feature film Forever, Darling (1956), in which he and Ball starred.

The original Desilu company continued long after Arnaz's divorce from Ball and her subsequent marriage to Gary Morton. Desilu continued to produce its own programs in addition to providing facilities to other producers. In 1962, Arnaz sold his share of Desilu to Ball and formed his own production company after their divorce. With the newly formed Desi Arnaz Productions, he made The Mothers-In-Law (at Desilu) for United Artists Television and NBC. This sitcom ran for two seasons from 1967 to 1969. During its two-year run, Arnaz made four guest appearances as a Spanish matador, Señor Delgado.

Arnaz's company was succeeded-in-interest by the company now known as Desilu, Too. Desilu, Too and Lucille Ball Productions worked hand-in-hand with MPI Home Video in the home video reissues of the Ball/Arnaz material not owned by CBS (successor-in-interest to Paramount Television, which in turn succeeded the original Desilu company). This material included Here's Lucy and The Mothers-In-Law, as well as many programs and specials Ball and Arnaz made independently of each other.

=== Later career ===
In the 1970s, Arnaz co-hosted a week of shows with daytime host and producer Mike Douglas. Vivian Vance appeared as a guest. Arnaz also headlined a Kraft Music Hall special on NBC that featured his two children, with a brief appearance by Vance. Arnaz suffered a severe attack of diverticulitis in 1971, which required an operation and several years of recovery. He worked with Universal Studios for two years working on development deals for two shows that eventually fell through, Dr. Domingo (the character did appear on one episode of Ironside) and Chairman of the Board starring Elke Sommer. Arnaz moved on to work on his autobiography for two years.

To promote his autobiography, A Book, on February 21, 1976, Arnaz served as a guest host on Saturday Night Live, with his son, Desi, Jr., also appearing. The program contained spoofs of I Love Lucy and The Untouchables. The spoofs of I Love Lucy were supposed to be earlier concepts of the show that never made it on the air, such as "I Love Louie", where Desi lived with Louis Armstrong. He read Lewis Carroll's poem "Jabberwocky" in a heavy Cuban accent (he pronounced it "Habberwocky"). Desi Jr., played the drums and, supported by the SNL band, Desi sang both "Babalú" and another favorite from his dance band days, "Cuban Pete"; the arrangements were similar to the ones used on I Love Lucy. He ended the broadcast by leading the entire cast in a conga line through the SNL studio.

In 1976, CBS paid tribute to Lucille Ball with the two-hour special CBS Salutes Lucy: The First 25 Years. Both Ball and Arnaz appeared on the screen for the special, which was the first time they appeared together in 16 years since their divorce.

When asked about returning to television in a 1976 newspaper article, Arnaz said, "People ask me to go back on TV but the thin' is, it's too tough competing with the Ricky Ricardo of 20 years ago. He looks a lot better than I do." Arnaz made a guest appearance on the TV series Alice, in 1978 starring Linda Lavin and produced by I Love Lucy co-creators Madelyn Pugh (Madelyn Davis) and Bob Carroll, Jr. His last acting role was as Mayor Leon Quiñones in the 1982 film The Escape Artist.

Arnaz owned the Indian Wells Country Club in Palm Desert, CA. He also taught classes at San Diego State University in studio production and acting for television.

== Personal life ==
=== Beliefs ===
Arnaz and Ball decided that I Love Lucy would maintain what Arnaz termed "basic good taste" and were therefore determined to avoid ethnic jokes, as well as humor based on physical handicaps or mental disabilities. Arnaz recalled that the only exception consisted of making fun of Ricky Ricardo's accent; even these jokes worked only when Lucy, as his wife, did the mimicking.

Arnaz was a lifelong Catholic.

=== Politics ===
A lifelong Republican, Arnaz was deeply patriotic about the United States. In his memoirs, he wrote that he knew of no other country in the world where "a sixteen-year-old kid, broke and unable to speak the language" could achieve the successes that he had. He was a supporter of Richard Nixon and member of the Spanish-Speaking Committee for the Re-Election of the President in 1972. Nixon appointed Arnaz as the U.S. roving ambassador to Latin America in the early 1970s. He was a supporter of Ronald Reagan and spoke at campaign rallies, such as one hosted by the National Republican Hispanic Assembly in 1980. He was an advocate for the Hispanic community, encouraging them to take the 1980 census to increase federal funding for their communities.

=== Marriages ===
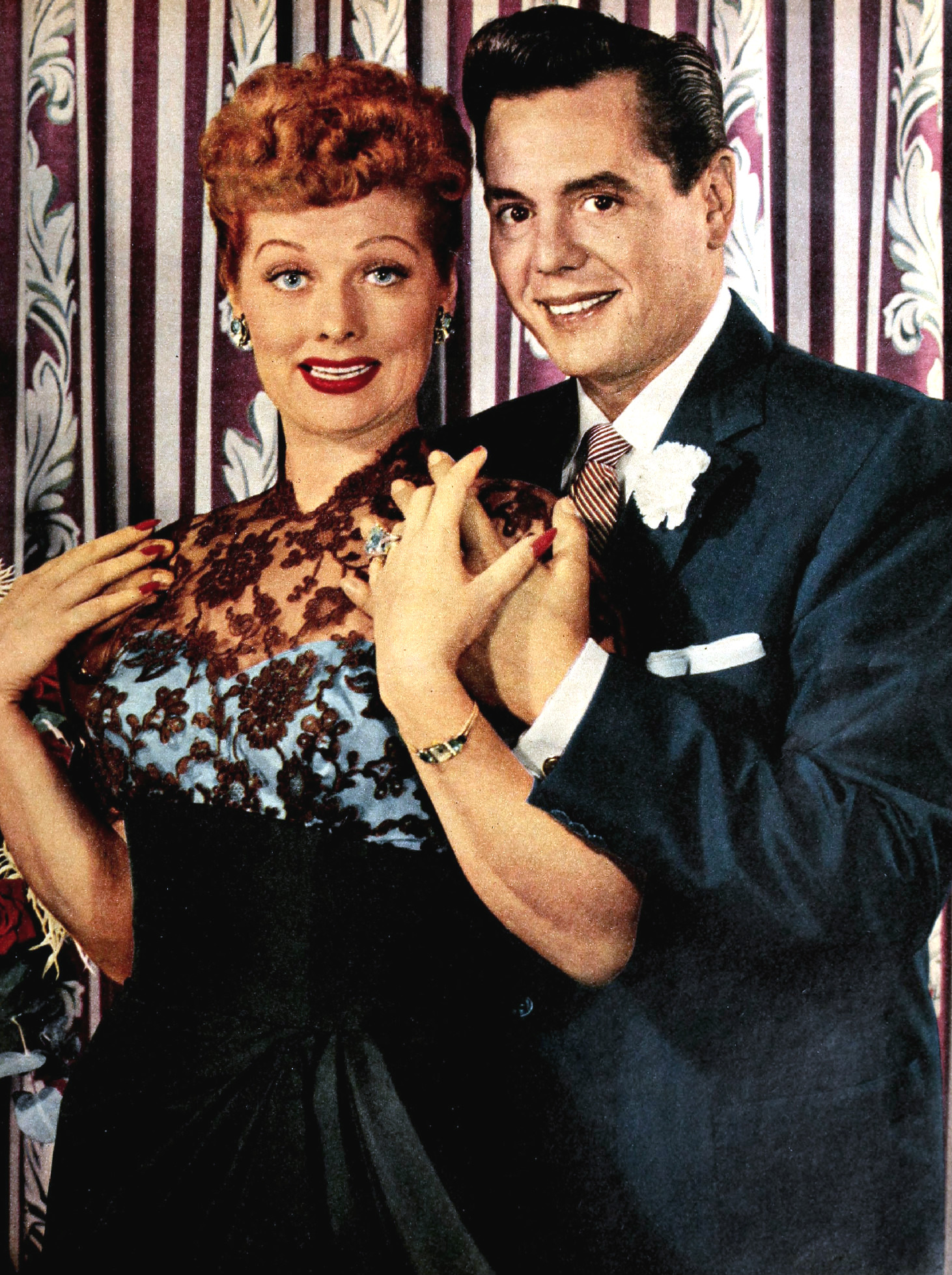
Ball and Arnaz in 1955

Arnaz and Lucille Ball were married on November 30, 1940. Their marriage was always turbulent. Convinced that Arnaz was being unfaithful to her, along with him coming home drunk several times, Ball filed for divorce in September 1944. The interlocutory decree became final in October 1944, but because they had spent the night together the day before, California state law at the time declared the divorce null and void. Arnaz and Ball subsequently had two children, Lucie Arnaz (born 1951) and Desi Arnaz Jr. (born 1953).

Hollywood procurer of prostitutes Scotty Bowers claimed in his memoir Full Service that he had procured as many as two to three prostitutes per week for Arnaz, each of whom was paid 200 dollars, as opposed to the usual 20. Lucille Ball confronted Bowers about this and publicly slapped him in the face, yelling "You! Stop pimping for my husband!"

Arnaz's marriage with Ball began to collapse under the strain of his growing problems with alcohol, gambling, and infidelity. According to his memoir, the combined pressures of managing the production company, as well as supervising its day-to-day operations, had greatly worsened as the company grew much larger, and he felt compelled to seek outlets to alleviate the stress. Arnaz also suffered from diverticulitis. Ball divorced him on March 2, 1960, which was coincidentally his birthday. When Ball returned to weekly television, she and Arnaz worked out an agreement regarding Desilu, wherein she bought him out.

Edith Mack Hirsch (née McSkimming) was Arnaz's second wife. After the two married on March 2, 1963 (Arnaz's 46th birthday), he greatly reduced his show business activities. The two were married for 22 years until Edith died from cancer on March 23, 1985.

Although Arnaz and Ball both married other spouses after their divorce in 1960, they remained friends and grew closer in his final decade. For Lucy's appearance at the Kennedy Center Honors in 1986, Arnaz had written a statement. Read by Robert Stack as a posthumous statement, Arnaz wrote, "P.S. I Love Lucy was never just a title."

=== Health ===
Arnaz suffered from knee injuries as a young man shortly before and during his military service in World War II. The pain was troublesome enough that he was disqualified from serving overseas. In the late 1960s, he was seriously injured in an accident when the floor in his home in Baja California collapsed and he was impaled by a tree stump. An operation saved his life, although his health was never the same after the incident. Throughout his life he periodically had to seek medical treatment for diverticulitis and intestinal issues, sometimes requiring hospitalization.

After his second wife Edith's death in 1985, Arnaz was persuaded by his children to seek treatment for his decades-long alcohol addiction, which by then had seriously damaged his health. Lucie Arnaz described her pride at attending a treatment meeting with her father where he stood up and said "I'm Desi, and I'm an alcoholic".

=== Arrests ===
Arnaz had numerous run-ins with the law. He was arrested in 1959 on an intoxication charge while he was walking Hollywood Blvd. In 1966, he was arrested and charged with assault with a deadly weapon after an altercation with youth parking in front of his house. Two young men were allegedly partying nearby and harassing his then-15-year-old daughter Lucie and her friend. Arnaz confronted them, threatened to shoot their tires and cars, and then fired two shots that went into the ground. He spent three hours at the San Diego jail and was released on $1,100 bail.

== Later life ==
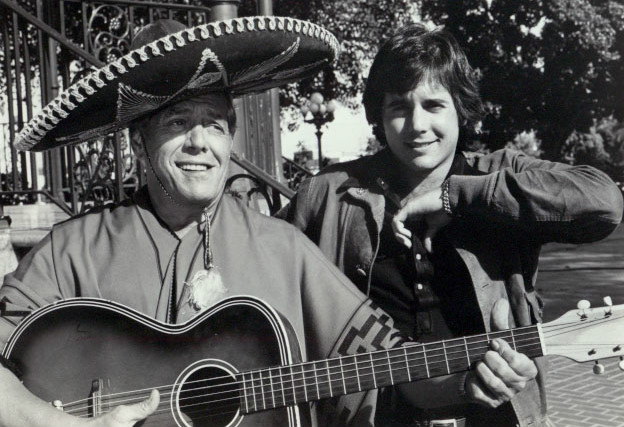
Arnaz with his son Desi Jr. in the 1974 television special, California, My Way

Desi Arnaz spent his retirement doing activities he enjoyed including sailing his yacht (he was a skilled yachtsman since childhood), fishing, and cooking Cuban dishes. He suffered from numerous health issues later in life. He contributed to charitable and nonprofit organizations, including San Diego State University. He was active in politics and made occasional public appearances. He was the guest of honor at the Carnival Miami in March 1982 where he performed with his children, Lucie and Desi Jr., in front of a crowd of 35,000.

=== Thoroughbred racing ===
Arnaz and his second wife eventually moved to Del Mar, California, where he lived the rest of his life in semi-retirement. He owned a horse-breeding farm in Corona, California (which was later moved to nearby Eastvale), and raced Thoroughbreds. The Desi Arnaz Stakes at Del Mar Racetrack is named in his honor.

== Death ==
Arnaz was a regular smoker for much of his life and often smoked cigarettes on the set of I Love Lucy. He smoked Cuban cigars until he was in his sixties. Arnaz was diagnosed with lung cancer in 1986 and underwent treatment. Lucille Ball visited him during this time in the hospital and the two watched VHS tapes of I Love Lucy. His daughter Lucie was by his side constantly during his final days.

On November 30, 1986, Ball called him. They talked for a short time due to Arnaz's state of health, as he had barely spoken to anyone and had not eaten for three days. According to Lucie, her mother simply said "I love you. I love you. Desi, I love you", repeating the words over the phone. Arnaz finished the conversation by answering "I love you, too, honey. Good luck with your show." Lucie later realized the date had been the 46th anniversary of Ball and Arnaz's wedding.

He died two days later on December 2, 1986, at the age of 69, three years before Lucy's death. Arnaz was cremated and his ashes were scattered at Sea of Cortés in Mexico. Ball was one of hundreds to attend Arnaz's funeral, which was held at St. James Roman Catholic Church in San Diego County, California. His death came just five days before Lucille Ball received the Kennedy Center Honors. His mother outlived him by almost two years.

== Legacy ==
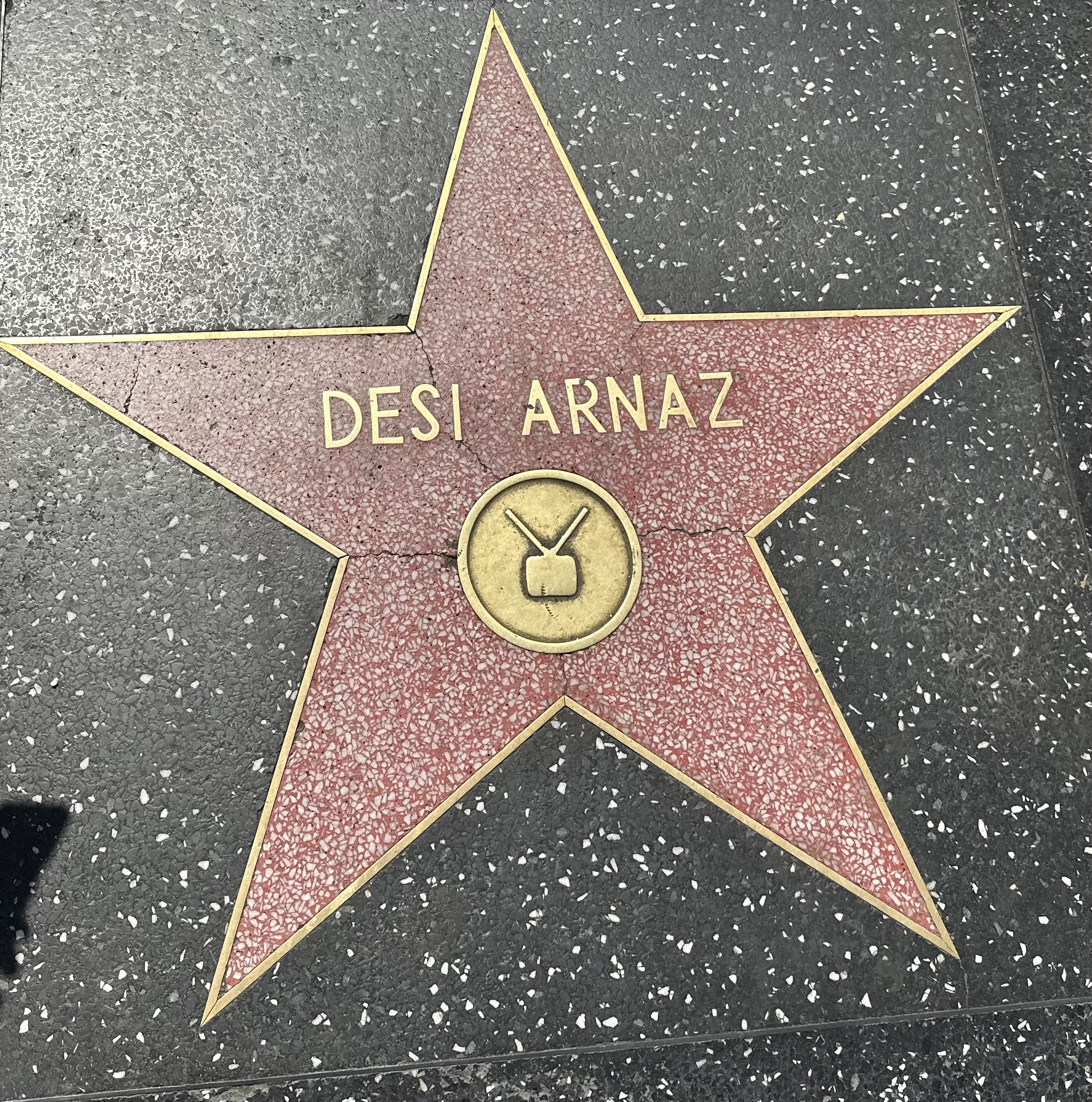
Desi Arnaz's star on the Hollywood Walk of Fame (television)

Desi Arnaz has two stars on the Hollywood Walk of Fame: one at 6301 Hollywood Boulevard for contributions to motion pictures and one at 6250 Hollywood Boulevard for television. Unlike his co-stars, Arnaz was never nominated for an Emmy for his performance in I Love Lucy; however, as executive producer of the series, he was nominated four times in the Best Situation Comedy category, winning twice. In 1956, he won a Golden Globe for Best Television Achievement for helping to shape the American Comedy through his contributions in front of and behind the camera of I Love Lucy. He was inducted into the Television Academy's Hall of Fame.

The Lucille Ball-Desi Arnaz Center museum is in Jamestown, New York, and the Desi Arnaz Bandshell in the Lucille Ball Memorial Park is in Celoron, New York.

Desi Arnaz appears as a character in Oscar Hijuelos's 1989 novel The Mambo Kings Play Songs of Love and is portrayed by his son, Desi Arnaz Jr., in the 1992 film adaptation, The Mambo Kings.

Maurice Benard portrayed Desi Arnaz in the 1991 television film Lucy & Desi: Before the Laughter.

In the 2003 television film Lucy, Desi Arnaz was portrayed by Danny Pino.

Arnaz was portrayed by Oscar Nuñez in I Love Lucy: A Funny Thing Happened on the Way to the Sitcom, a comedy about how Arnaz and Ball battled to get their sitcom on the air. It had its world premiere in Los Angeles on July 12, 2018, co-starring Sarah Drew as Lucille Ball and Seamus Dever as I Love Lucy creator-producer-head writer Jess Oppenheimer. The play, written by Jess Oppenheimer's son, Gregg Oppenheimer, was recorded in front of a live audience for nationwide public radio broadcast and online distribution. BBC Radio 4 broadcast a serialized version of the play in the UK in August 2020, as LUCY LOVES DESI: A Funny Thing Happened on the Way to the Sitcom, starring Wilmer Valderrama as Arnaz and co-starring Anne Heche as Lucille Ball.

On March 2, 2019, Google celebrated what would have been Arnaz's 102nd birthday with a Google Doodle.

Javier Bardem portrayed Arnaz in the 2021 biographical film Being the Ricardos written and directed by Aaron Sorkin and produced by Amazon Studios, alongside Nicole Kidman as Ball. He was nominated for an Academy Award for Best Actor.

== Filmography ==
=== As actor ===
- 1940: Too Many Girls .... Manuelito Lynch
- 1941: Father Takes a Wife .... Carlos Bardez
- 1942: Four Jacks and a Jill .... Steve Sarto / King Stephan VIII of Aregal
- 1942: The Navy Comes Through .... Pat Tarriba
- 1943: Bataan .... Felix Ramirez
- 1946: Cuban Pete .... Himself
- 1947: Jitterumba (Short) .... Band Leader
- 1949: Holiday in Havana .... Carlos Estrada
- 1951: I Love Lucy (181 episodes, 1951–1957) .... Ricky Ricardo
- 1952: What's My Line .... Himself (Guest)
- 1953: I Love Lucy: The Movie .... Ricky Ricardo / Himself
- 1954: The Long, Long Trailer .... Nicholas 'Nicky' Collini
- 1955: What's My Line .... Himself (Guest) with Lucille Ball
- 1956: Lucy's Really Lost Moments .... Ricky Ricardo
- 1956: I Love Lucy Christmas Show (TV Series) .... Ricky Ricardo
- 1956: Forever, Darling .... Lorenzo Xavier Vega
- 1957: The Lucy–Desi Comedy Hour (13 episodes, 1957–1960) .... Ricky Ricardo
- 1958: Westinghouse Desilu Playhouse (5 episodes, 1958–1960) .... Ricky Ricardo
- 1959: Make Room for Daddy (1 episode, 1959) .... Ricky Ricardo
- 1959: NBC Sunday Showcase (1 episode, 1959) .... Ricky Ricardo
- 1961: The Red Skelton Show (1 episode, 1961) .... Guest / Himself
- 1967: The Mothers-in-Law (4 episodes, 1967–1968) .... Raphael del Gado
- 1970: Kraft Music Hall (1 episode, 1970) .... Host
- 1970: The Virginian (repackaged as "The Men From Shiloh") (1 episode, 1970) .... El Jefe
- 1974: Ironside (1 episode "Riddle at 24000" season 7 episode 23, 1974) .... Dr. Juan Domingo
- 1976: Saturday Night Live (February 21, as host)
- 1976: CBS Salutes Lucy: The First 25 Years (TV Special) .... Himself
- 1978: Alice (1 episode, 1978) .... Paco
- 1982: The Escape Artist .... Mayor Leon Quiñones (final film role)

=== As producer ===
- 1952: I Love Lucy (executive producer) (131 episodes, 1952–1956) (producer)
- 1955: Those Whiting Girls TV series (executive producer) (unknown episodes)
- 1956: Forever, Darling (producer)
- 1956: I Love Lucy Christmas Show (TV) (producer)
- 1957: The Lucy–Desi Comedy Hour (executive producer) (13 episodes, 1957–1960)
- 1958: The Fountain of Youth (TV) (executive producer)
- 1958: The Texan TV series (executive producer) (unknown episodes)
- 1958: The Ann Sothern Show (executive producer) (93 episodes, 1958–1961)
- 1960: New Comedy Showcase TV series (executive producer)
- 1961: The Untouchables (executive producer) (3 episodes, 1961–1962)
- 1962: The Lucy Show (executive producer) (15 episodes, 1962–1963)
- 1967: The Mothers-In-Law (executive producer) (56 episodes, 1967–1969)
- 1968: Land's End TV pilot (producer)

=== As writer ===
- 1959: Westinghouse Desilu Playhouse (1 episode, 1959) – Ballad for a Bad Man (1959) TV episode (writer)
- 1968: Land's End TV pilot (creator)

=== As director ===
- 1959: Sunday Showcase (1 episode, 1959)
- 1959: The Lucy–Desi Comedy Hour (3 episodes, 1959–1960)
- 1966: The Carol Channing Show (TV)
- 1967: The Mothers-in-Law (24 episodes, 1967–1968)

=== Soundtracks ===
- 1940: Too Many Girls (performer: "Spic 'n' Spanish", "You're Nearer", "Conga") ("'Cause We Got Cake")
- 1941: Father Takes a Wife ("Perfidia" (1939), "Mi amor" (1941))
- 1942: Four Jacks and a Jill ("Boogie Woogie Conga" 1941)
- 1946: Desi Arnaz and His Orchestra (performer: "Guadalajara", "Babalu (Babalú)", "Tabu (Tabú)", "Pin Marin") ... a.k.a. "Melody Masters: Desi Arnaz and His Orchestra" – USA (series title)
- 1949: Holiday in Havana (writer: "Holiday In Havana", "The Arnaz Jam")
- 1956: Forever, Darling (performer: "Forever, Darling" (reprise))
- 1999: I Love Lucy (3 episodes, 1952–1956) ... a.k.a. "Lucy in Connecticut" – USA (rerun title) ... a.k.a. "The Sunday Lucy Show" – USA (rerun title) ... a.k.a. "The Top Ten Lucy Show" – USA (rerun title) – Lucy and Bob Hope (1956) TV episode (performer: "Nobody Loves the Ump" (uncredited)) – Ricky's European Booking (1955) TV episode (performer: "Forever, Darling" (uncredited)) – Cuban Pals (1952) TV episode (performer: "The Lady in Red", "Similau")
- 1958: The Lucy–Desi Comedy Hour (1 episode, 1958) ... a.k.a. "We Love Lucy" – USA (syndication title) – Lucy Wins a Race Horse (1958) TV episode (performer: "The Bayamo")
- 2001: I Love Lucy's 50th Anniversary Special (TV) (performer: "California, Here I Come", "Babalu (Babalú)") ... a.k.a. "The I Love Lucy 50th Anniversary Special" – USA (DVD title)

== Bibliography ==
- Arnaz, Desi. A Book. New York: William Morrow, 1976; ISBN 0688003427 (autobiography to 1960)
- Sanders, Coyne Steven, and Thomas W. Gilbert. Desilu: The Story of Lucille Ball and Desi Arnaz. New York: Morrow, 1993; ISBN 9780688112172 (revised edition 2011 ISBN 9780062020017) (full dual biography focusing prominently on business affairs of Desilu Productions)
- Brady, Kathleen. Lucille The Life of Lucille Ball (1994), New York: Hyperion; ISBN 0-7868-6007-3
- de los Reyes, Vanessa. I Love Ricky: How Desi Arnaz Challenged American Popular Culture (2008). Department of History, Miami University, Oxford, Ohio.
- Pérez Firmat, Gustavo. "The Man Who Loved Lucy", in Life on the Hyphen: The Cuban-American Way. Austin: The University of Texas Press, 1994. Rpt. 1996, 1999. Revised and expanded edition, 2012.
- Harris, Warren. Lucy & Desi: The Legendary Love Story of Television's Most Famous Couple. New York: Simon & Schuster, 1991. ISBN 0671747096
- Purdum, Todd S. Desi Arnaz: The Man Who Invented Television. New York: Simon & Schuster, 2025. ISBN 9781668023068

== See also ==
- List of Cuban Americans
- List of actors with Hollywood Walk of Fame motion picture stars
