= Koplowitz =

Koplowitz is a surname, and may refer to:

- Alicia Koplowitz (b. 1954), Spanish businesswoman
- Dan Koplowitz (b. 1980), founder of US recording label Friendly Fire Recordings
- Esther Koplowitz (b. 1953), Spanish businesswoman
- Oskar Koplowitz (1911–1984), German-born US author, known as Oskar Seidlin
- Zoe Koplowitz (b. 1948), US marathon runner
