= Hollywood (miniseries) =

American drama streaming television miniseries

- Genre: Historical drama
- Created by: Ryan Murphy; Ian Brennan
- Starring: David Corenswet; Darren Criss; Laura Harrier; Joe Mantello; Dylan McDermott; Jake Picking; Jeremy Pope; Holland Taylor; Samara Weaving; Jim Parsons; Patti LuPone
- Composer: Nathan Barr
- Country of origin: United States
- Original language: English
- No. of episodes: 7

Production
- Executive producers: Ryan Murphy; Ian Brennan; Alexis Martin Woodall; Janet Mock; Eric Kovtun; Ned Martel; Darren Criss; Jim Parsons; David Corenswet
- Producers: Todd Nenninger; Lou Eyrich; Eryn Krueger Mekash
- Cinematography: Simon Dennis; Blake McClure
- Editors: Butch Wertman; Andrew Groves; Suzanne Spangler; Lousine Shamamian
- Running time: 44–57 minutes
- Production companies: Ryan Murphy Television; Prospect Films

Original release
- Network: Netflix
- Release: May 1, 2020

Hollywood is an American alternate history, historical drama television miniseries starring an ensemble cast including David Corenswet, Darren Criss, Laura Harrier, Joe Mantello, Dylan McDermott, Jake Picking, Jeremy Pope, Holland Taylor, Samara Weaving, Jim Parsons, and Patti LuPone. Created by Ryan Murphy and Ian Brennan, it was released on Netflix on May 1, 2020.

The miniseries is about a group of aspiring actors and filmmakers during the Hollywood Golden Age in the post-World War II era trying to make their dreams come true. The series received mixed reviews from critics who praised the acting and production values, but criticized the tone, writing, and artistic license taken. The series received 12 nominations at the 72nd Primetime Emmy Awards, including acting nods for Pope, Taylor, McDermott, and Parsons, winning two.

== Premise ==
The series explores Hollywood in the late 1940s, following World War II where traditional power dynamics in the American film industry are systematically dismantled and racism and homophobia are consigned to the dustbin of history.

== Cast and characters ==
=== Main ===
- David Corenswet as Jack Castello, a World War II veteran who moves to Hollywood in hopes of becoming an actor and finds work at a gas station that ends up being a front for offering sexual services to Hollywood elite.
- Darren Criss as Raymond Ainsley, a half-Filipino aspiring film director hoping to break boundaries in Hollywood, and Camille's boyfriend
- Laura Harrier as Camille Washington, an up-and-coming black actress facing prejudice because of her race, and Raymond's girlfriend
- Joe Mantello as Richard "Dick" Samuels, a studio executive at Ace Studios who is a closeted gay man. Hank Stuever of The Washington Post describes him as "intimidating but receptive".
- Dylan McDermott as Ernest "Ernie" West, a pimp, based on Scotty Bowers, who runs his business out of a gas station and recruits Jack
- Jake Picking as Roy Fitzgerald / Rock Hudson, a fictionalized version of the actor, and Archie's boyfriend. Liz Cantrell of Town & Country magazine characterized this version of Rock Hudson as "a young unknown...trying to make his way in the world, and beginning to understand who he really is."
- Jeremy Pope as Archie Coleman, a black aspiring screenwriter facing prejudice, and Roy's boyfriend
- Holland Taylor as Ellen Kincaid, a studio executive and mentor for aspiring actors at Ace Studios. Cantrell wrote that the character "gets what she wants and knows a star when she sees one."
- Samara Weaving as Claire Wood, an up-and-coming actress, Camille's rival, and the daughter of Ace and Avis Amberg. Cantrell described her as "an ambitious up-and-comer".
- Jim Parsons as Henry Willson, a fictionalized version of the Hollywood talent agent whose clients included Rock Hudson
- Patti LuPone as Avis Amberg, wife of Ace Amberg, the head of Ace Studios, and a former actress

=== Recurring ===
- Maude Apatow as Henrietta Castello, Jack's wife who is pregnant with twins and works as a waitress. Robert Lloyd of the Los Angeles Times wrote that the character serves "largely as a millstone" and that the storyline does not give a lot of "attention" to her.
- Mira Sorvino as Jeanne Crandall, a successful but aging actress, Ace's mistress, and Camille's scene partner
- Michelle Krusiec as Anna May Wong, a fictionalized version of the Chinese-American actress, whom Raymond tries to help

=== Guest ===
- Rob Reiner as Ace Amberg, the head of Ace Studios and the husband of Avis
- Brian Chenoweth as Lon Silver, Ace's attorney
- Jake Regal as Erwin Kaye, a man Henrietta works with and has an affair with
- William Frederick Knight as Harry Golden, a veteran film editor at Ace Studios
- Queen Latifah as Hattie McDaniel, a fictionalized version of the actress, who gives Camille advice
- Katie McGuinness as Vivien Leigh, a fictionalized version of the actress
- Paget Brewster as Tallulah Bankhead, a fictionalized version of the actress
- Harriet Sansom Harris as Eleanor Roosevelt, a fictionalized version of the First Lady and Avis's friend
- Daniel London as George Cukor, a fictionalized version of the director and producer known for his grand house parties
- Billy Boyd as Noël Coward, a fictionalized version of the playwright, composer, director, and actor
- Alison Wright as Ms. Roswell, the gatekeeper to Ace Studios

== Episodes ==
| No. | Title | Directed by | Written by | Original release date |
|---|---|---|---|---|
| 1 | "Hooray for Hollywood" | Ryan Murphy | Ryan Murphy & Ian Brennan | May 1, 2020 |
In post-World War II, veteran Jack Castello moves to Los Angeles to make his big break in Hollywood. However, he struggles in the business and has a hard time even being cast as an extra. This bothers his wife Henrietta who is pregnant and wanting to buy a house. At a bar, Jack meets Ernie West, who offers him a job at his gas station, which Jack accepts. Ernie reveals that he makes his attendants service female customers for extra money, which Jack begins doing. However, Jack quits when Ernie tries to force him to service a male customer, but gets his job back after discovering Henrietta is pregnant with twins. He later meets black male prostitute and aspiring screenwriter Archie Coleman, and convinces Ernie to hire him. On his first day on the job, Archie services aspiring actor Roy Fitzgerald. After servicing a casting director, Jack finally lands an acting job. However, he is later tricked by a police officer undercover as a client who has him arrested.
| 2 | "Hooray for Hollywood: Part 2" | Daniel Minahan | Ryan Murphy & Ian Brennan | May 1, 2020 |
Ernie bails Jack out of jail. Jack later services again his first client, Avis Amberg, whose husband owns the studio where he will have his first screen test and she ensures he will do well. Meanwhile, fledgling director Raymond Ainsley recruits Anna May Wong to be his leading lady. He meets with studio executive Dick Samuels who warns him about casting Wong. Although Jack fails his screen test, executive and acting mentor Ellen Kincaid convinces Dick to put him under contract. Aspiring black actress and Raymond's girlfriend Camille Washington finds herself only able to get parts as a servant. Dick puts Raymond's film on hold, but allows him to pick a script from a pile and direct that film. He picks a script written by Archie about a woman who jumps off the Hollywood Sign. Archie also continues to service Roy and the two find themselves falling for one another. Roy also meets Henry Willson, a closeted homosexual agent who agrees to take him on as a client on the condition that he submits to Willson's sexual desires and that his name be changed to Rock Hudson. Dick greenlights Raymond and Archie's film, Peg.
| 3 | "Outlaws" | Michael Uppendahl | Ryan Murphy & Ian Brennan | May 1, 2020 |
Ernie informs the attendants that they have been invited to an exclusive Hollywood party hosted by George Cukor to service the closeted homosexual industry people. Jack desperately wants the male lead part in Peg, but Archie has his eyes set on Rock for the role. Henry invites Rock to join him at the Cukor party for Rock to socialize with Dick, who will be at the party and could get Rock a screen test. Ellen begins preparing Jack for his Peg screen test. Avis' daughter, Claire, gets a screen test for Peg, while Camille attempts to convince Raymond to give her the part and offers him ideas on how to tweak the script. At the party, Rock and Dick begin to have a sexual encounter, but Dick is uncomfortable and puts a stop to it. He laments about how he has always had to play a role and hide who he really is, before telling Rock to stop allowing Henry to control him. Rock then professes his love to Archie, while Raymond confesses his love to Camille and tells her that he will make her the star of Peg. Dick, inspired by his interaction with Rock, and Ellen agree to fight for Camille to be the lead.
| 4 | "(Screen) Tests" | Janet Mock | Ian Brennan & Janet Mock & Ryan Murphy | May 1, 2020 |
Ace Amberg, the head of the studio, greenlights Peg but demands that Archie be taken off the project, fearing an African-American screenwriter's involvement would provoke a scandal. Ace later has a heart attack in the midst of a sexual encounter. With Ace incapacitated, Avis is put in charge of the studio. Dick informs Archie that he has been removed from the film; Archie refuses to be sidelined, and Dick agrees but warns him about the consequences. Later, Archie and Raymond help Camille prepare for her screen test, with Raymond directing her to put more emotion into it. During his screen test, Rock constantly messes up his lines. Claire blows her audition on purpose to give Camille a fighting chance. While Camille gives a great performance in her test, Avis worries about casting a black woman and reluctantly chooses Claire. Jack is cast as the male lead, despite Henry's attempt to blackmail Avis into casting Rock. Avis' friend and First Lady Eleanor Roosevelt gives a rousing and inspiring speech to Avis on why she should cast Camille in the lead role.
| 5 | "Jump" | Michael Uppendahl | Ryan Murphy & Ian Brennan | May 1, 2020 |
Dick and Ellen finally convince Avis to cast Camille in the film. Archie's name remains attached to the film while Rock, Claire, and Wong are cast in smaller roles. The film is retitled Meg. The studio faces significant backlash, mostly from the South, and Camille begins to receive racist telephone calls. Dick takes command of production, ensuring everything stays under budget. Dick later convinces Raymond and Archie to change the ending so Meg lives. When a local gossip magazine learns of Jack's arrest for solicitation and plans to run it, Avis recruits Henry, who manages to squash the story by ordering mobsters to brutally beat the magazine reporter. In return, Henry asks Avis to make him a producer on Meg which she agrees to. Dick berates Raymond for approving an over-budget redo and forces him to pay for it himself. Ellen flirts with Dick who rebuffs her, telling her he cannot be with anyone at the moment, and he later goes to a gay bar. Henrietta reveals to Jack that the twins are not his, but a friend she has grown close to and she is moving away with him. Desolate, Jack moves in with Archie.
| 6 | "Meg" | Janet Mock | Ian Brennan & Janet Mock & Reilly Smith | May 1, 2020 |
Cast and crew members from Meg are targeted by white supremacist groups. Ace's lawyer threatens to suspend production, but Avis is determined to finish the film. Ernie raises the money Raymond needs to cover going over budget. Jack and Henrietta apologize to one another and say a final goodbye. To repay Ernie for his help, Jack and Archie offer him a part in the film which he accepts. Ellen coaches Ernie to improve his acting skills. The film is finally concluded. Archie asks Rock to move in with him which he accepts. Jack and Claire fall for each other and decide to attend the premiere together. Ace awakens from his coma and is advised to scrap the film, but he loves it. Dick threatens to quit unless the film is released and reveals to Ace that he is gay. Unsatisfied with the ending, Henry demands a new scene be added, which Raymond approves. Avis demands to co-chair the studio and Ace agrees to it. The two rekindle their previously strained relationship. The next morning, Avis finds that Ace has died from heart complications, leaving her grieving. Ace's lawyer has the reel for Meg burned.
| 7 | "A Hollywood Ending" | Jessica Yu | Ian Brennan & Ryan Murphy | May 1, 2020 |
Avis fires the lawyer who had the film reels burned. At Ace's funeral, the film's editor reveals he made a copy for safekeeping. The studio opts for a wide release of Meg. Ernie and Ellen confess their love, before he reveals his terminal lung cancer, but she accepts him anyway. Jack and Claire start a relationship. The film becomes a record-breaking success, while Camille, Wong, Raymond, Archie, and Jack all receive Oscar nominations. Archie and Rock make their relationship public at the ceremony. Rock fires Henry as his agent after he berates him for coming out with Archie. When Camille is told to wait outside, she refuses and sits in the front row. At the 1948 Oscars, Wong, Raymond, Archie, and Camille win. Jack loses but proposes to Claire, who accepts. Hattie McDaniel congratulates Camille on her win. A year later, Henry is sober and apologizes to Rock. Dick dies of cancer and everyone involved in Meg attends his funeral. Avis greenlights Henry's new film about a homosexual couple, Dreamland, with Rock, Jack, Archie, and Raymond joining as well. Ernie plans to sell his gas station and offers it as a set for Dreamland.

== Production ==
=== Development ===
On February 23, 2019, it was announced that Netflix had given the production a straight-to-series order consisting of seven episodes. The series was created by Ian Brennan, and Ryan Murphy. Brennan and Murphy were also set to executive produce the series alongside Darren Criss and David Corenswet. The series was released on May 1, 2020.

=== Casting ===
On September 3, 2019, it was reported that Patti LuPone, Holland Taylor, Darren Criss, Jeremy Pope, Dylan McDermott, Jim Parsons, Corenswet and Joe Mantello had been cast in series regular roles.

== Reception ==
On Rotten Tomatoes, the series holds an approval rating of 58% based on 135 reviews, with an average rating of 6.10/10. The site's critical consensus reads: "With its heart on its sleeve and style to spare, Hollywood is anything but subtle – if only its good intentions were paired with a less convoluted story." On Metacritic, the series has a weighted average score of 56 out of 100, based on 35 critics, indicating "mixed or average reviews".

Writing for the Chicago Sun-Times, Richard Roeper gave the series two-and-a-half stars out of four, saying: "It's a fascinating blend of fact (or least stories based on factual characters) and fiction, and the performances from the cast of rising stars and reliable veterans are dazzling—but like many a motion picture, Hollywood can't overcome script problems that surface about midway through the story."

Conversely, Hugh Montgomery of the BBC described the series as "spineless and inert", giving it one out of five stars and saying "A show about Tinseltown that chose to confront and prod at these continuing, dispiriting realities rather than concoct its own vapid, hubristic fantasies would be worth 10 times this one." Similarly, The Guardian's Lucy Mangan criticized its "counterfactual history", giving the series a two out of five-star review, writing: "This should be the perfect set-up for a scabrous look at prejudice, corruption, the trading of sexual currency, coercion, the well-oiled machinations that underlie an industry and how it all shapes history—all through a #MeToo lens. But it becomes a mere wish-fulfilment fantasy that, whether it intends to or not, suggests that if a few people had just been that bit braver, then movies—and therefore the world!—would be a glorious, egalitarian Eden. It is a show that is smug and obtuse enough to believe la la land's self-regarding idea that celluloid art directly shapes our lives."

While FAULT Magazine praised the show for its beautiful work on costume design and career topping performances of Dylan McDermott, Jeremy Pope and Samara Weaving, they criticised the show's dangerous embellishment of systemic prejudice of post-war USA. "The only ones who benefit from the erasure of Hollywood's brutal history of racism and homophobia, are those that perpetrated it."

Feature articles in Vanity Fair, Esquire, Town & Country, and Rolling Stone covered the Netflix production as depicting the real-life story of Scotty Bowers, but no reference is made to Bowers or his tell-all book, Full Service: My Adventures in Hollywood and the Secret Sex Lives of the Stars in the Netflix production's credits.

== Accolades ==
| Year | Association | Category | Nominated artist/work | Result | Ref. |
|---|---|---|---|---|---|
| 2020 | Black Reel Television Awards | Outstanding Television Movie or Limited Series | Hollywood | Nominated | |
| 2020 | Black Reel Television Awards | Outstanding Actor, TV Movie/Limited Series | Jeremy Pope | Nominated | |
| 2020 | Black Reel Television Awards | Outstanding Director, TV Movie/Limited Series | Janet Mock (for "(Screen) Tests") | Nominated | |
| 2020 | Primetime Emmy Awards | Outstanding Lead Actor in a Limited Series or Movie | Jeremy Pope | Nominated | |
| 2020 | Primetime Emmy Awards | Outstanding Supporting Actor in a Limited Series or Movie | Dylan McDermott (for "Meg") | Nominated | |
| 2020 | Primetime Emmy Awards | Outstanding Supporting Actor in a Limited Series or Movie | Jim Parsons (for "Outlaws") | Nominated | |
| 2020 | Primetime Emmy Awards | Outstanding Supporting Actress in a Limited Series or Movie | Holland Taylor (for "Jump") | Nominated | |
| 2020 | Primetime Creative Arts Emmy Awards | Outstanding Period Costumes | Lou Eyrich, Sarah Evelyn, Tiger Curran and Suzy Freeman (for "A Hollywood Ending") | Nominated | |
| 2020 | Primetime Creative Arts Emmy Awards | Outstanding Period and/or Character Hairstyling | Michelle Ceglia, Barry Lee Moe, George Guzman, Michele Arvizo and Maria Elena Pantoja (for "A Hollywood Ending") | Won | |
| 2020 | Primetime Creative Arts Emmy Awards | Outstanding Makeup (Non-Prosthetic) | Eryn Krueger Mekash, Kim Ayers, Kerrin Jackson and Ana Gabriela Quiñonez (for "Outlaws") | Nominated | |
| 2020 | Primetime Creative Arts Emmy Awards | Outstanding Prosthetic Makeup | Vincent Van Dyke, Cary Ayers and Bruce Spaulding Fuller (for "Jump") | Nominated | |
| 2020 | Primetime Creative Arts Emmy Awards | Outstanding Music Composition for a Limited Series, Movie or Special (Original Dramatic Score) | Nathan Barr (for "Hooray for Hollywood: Part 2") | Nominated | |
| 2020 | Primetime Creative Arts Emmy Awards | Outstanding Original Main Title Theme Music | Nathan Barr | Won | |
| 2020 | Primetime Creative Arts Emmy Awards | Outstanding Production Design for a Narrative Period or Fantasy Program | Matthew Flood Ferguson, Mark Robert Taylor and Melissa Licht | Nominated | |
| 2021 | Art Directors Guild Awards | Excellence in Production Design for a Television Movie or Limited Series | Matthew Flood Ferguson | Nominated | |
| 2021 | Critics' Choice Awards | Best Supporting Actor in a Movie/Miniseries | Dylan McDermott | Nominated | |
| 2021 | Golden Globe Awards | Best Supporting Actor – Television | Jim Parsons | Nominated | |
| 2021 | Hollywood Music in Media Awards | Best Main Title Theme – TV Show/Limited Series | Nathan Barr | Won | |
| 2021 | Make-Up Artists and Hair Stylists Guild Awards | Best Television Series, Limited or Miniseries or New Media Series – Best Period and/or Character Make-Up | Eryn Krueger Mekash, Kim Ayers, Kerrin Jackson and Ana Gabriela Quinonez | Nominated | |
| 2021 | Make-Up Artists and Hair Stylists Guild Awards | Best Television Series, Limited or Miniseries or New Media Series – Best Period and/or Character Hair Styling | Michelle Ceglia, Barry Lee Moe, George Guzman and Michele Arvizo | Nominated | |
| 2021 | Make-Up Artists and Hair Stylists Guild Awards | Best Special Make-Up Effects in a Television Series, Limited or Miniseries or New Media Series | Eryn Krueger Mekash, Kerrin Jackson and Ana Gabriela Quinonez | Nominated | |
| 2021 | Motion Picture Sound Editors Awards | Outstanding Achievement in Sound Editing - Episodic Short Form – Music | David Klotz (for "Hooray for Hollywood") | Nominated | |
| 2021 | Writers Guild of America Awards | Long Form – Original | Ian Brennan, Janet Mock, Ryan Murphy and Reilly Smith | Nominated | |
