= Kaplowitz =

Kaplowitz is a surname. Notable people with the surname include:

- Ralph Kaplowitz (1919–2009), American basketball player
- Mike Kaplowitz (born 1959), American lawyer, financial planner and Democratic politician

== See also ==
- Koplowitz
