= Desiderio Alberto Arnaz II =

Cuban politician and father of actor Desi Arnaz

Mayor of Santiago de Cuba
- In office 1923–1932

Personal details
- Born: Desiderio Alberto Arnaz y Alberni II; 8 March 1894 Santiago de Cuba, Cuba
- Died: 31 May 1973 (aged 79) Miami, Florida, U.S.
- Spouse: Dolores de Acha y de Socias (m. 1916, divorced): Anne M. Wilson (m. 1941)
- Children: Desi Arnaz; Connie Arnaz
- Relatives: Lucie Arnaz (granddaughter); Desi Arnaz Jr. (grandson)

Desiderio Alberto Arnaz y Alberni II (March 8, 1894 – May 31, 1973) was a Cuban politician and the father of Desi Arnaz.

== Early life ==
He was the son of Desiderio Alberto Arnaz y Alberni (1857–1929), a medical doctor (and grandson of Manuel Arnaz, a mayor of Santiago de Cuba in 1869), and Rosa Alberni y Portuondo (1870–unknown), a member of the Cuban nobility and the great-grandson of a mayor of Santiago de Cuba, José Joaquín Portuondo y Rizo, 1st Conde de Santa Inés (1762–1824). He graduated in 1913 from the Southern College of Pharmacy (merged and known now as Mercer University, School of Pharmacy and Health Sciences) in Atlanta, Georgia, and would begin his career as a medical doctor.

== Politics ==
Arnaz was the youngest mayor of Santiago de Cuba (1923–1932). He was elected to the Cuban House of Representatives in November 1932 for the Oriente Province. When president Gerardo Machado was overthrown in August 1933, Rep. Arnaz was arrested and jailed. Six months later, he was allowed to go into exile.

== Marriages and children ==
Arnaz married Dolores "Lolita" de Acha y de Socias (2 April 1896 – 24 October 1988) in 1916 and had one son, Desiderio "Desi" Arnaz III. However, his marriage to Dolores ended in divorce after they began living in the U.S. He later adopted Connie Arnaz (10 June 1932 - 26 January 2026), the daughter of Anne M. Wilson (12 June 1902 – 7 June 1994), whom he married in 1941.

== Death ==
Arnaz died in 1973 in Miami, Florida. He is entombed above President Machado at Caballero Rivero Woodlawn North Park Cemetery and Mausoleum.
