= Spanish nobility in Cuba =

Individuals and families recognized in Cuba as members of the aristocratic class

Coat of arms of Ducado de la Torre.

Cuban nobility encompasses all the individuals and families recognized in Cuba as members of the aristocratic class, hence possessing inheritance privileges.

== History ==
The 19th century Spanish Empire saw much of its power weakened by its rival countries (France and the United Kingdom), it also saw many of its colonies in America being influenced by the republican ideologies of the recently independent United States. In an effort to strengthen its holdings, the Spanish Crown decided to grant titles of nobility to much of the colonial aristocracy. This bestowing of royal grace made the recipients loyal to the Crown, and more assimilated to the Iberian titled nobility. No other Spanish colony received as many grants of noble titles as Cuba, a jewel of the late Spanish Empire.

The Cuban aristocracy had always attempted to create a second Paris or Madrid in its main cities of Havana, Matanzas and Santiago de Cuba. Elegant, richly decorated manors, governmental buildings, opera houses, play houses, palaces, etc. covered the streets of the capital. The Spanish Crown was not the only entity to award titles of nobility, the Catholic Church made use of its authority to also award titles in the island. Families, through marriage and inheritance, also bore European titles, such as those from France, Italy (including the former Kingdom of Naples and the Two Sicilies) as well as Germany.

The non-royal titles issued in Cuba follow the Spanish designation and resembled those of continental Europe. They were those of: Duke (Duque), Marquis (Marqués), Count (Conde), Viscount (Vizconde), Baron (Barón), Lord (Señor)—in that order of importance and social standing. The title of Grandee of Spain was usually annexed to another noble title but may also be bestowed on a person without a traditional noble title, in the last case the person would have Grandee of Spain written after his name; all Grandees are addressed as Excellency, the title being equal to that of a Duke and all Dukes are Grandees. Titles bestowed often had the name of a place in Cuba (e.g. Marqués de Pinar del Rio, Conde de Yumurí), the surname of the family (e.g. Marqués de Azpesteguia, Conde de Casa (house) Montalvo) or in remembrance of some Royal favor or deed (e.g. Marqués de la Gratitud, Marqués de la Real Proclamación).

After the Cuban War of Independence and Spanish–American War ended in 1898, many of these nobles stayed in the island, or moved to other former Spanish colonies, such as Puerto Rico; some returned to Spain. Although the new Republic of Cuba did not give itself the power to create and bestow new titles of nobility, it did not interfere with the already established tradition. Many families who possessed noble titles continued to use them, and the public respected their historical meaning and social position.

This all changed with the Cuban Revolution of 1959; soon the Communist government moved against these nobles, forcing many to return to Spain or into exile in the United States.

The last pre-1898 nobleman to live in Cuba, Don Ignacio Ponce de León y Ponce de León, Marqués de Aguas Claras and Count de Casa Ponce de León y Maroto, died in Havana in 1973 leaving a remaining descendant.

Coat of Arms of Ducado de la Unión de Cuba.

== List of noble titles bestowed by Spanish monarchs or inherited by Cubans ==
- Duque de Mola (grandee of Spain) (title canceled in 2022)
- Duque de la Torre (grandee of Spain)
- Duque de la Union de Cuba (grandee of Spain)
- Marqués de Aguas Claras
- Marqués de Aguero
- Marqués de Almendares
- Marqués de Alta Gracia
- Marqués de Arcos
- Marqués de Arguelles
- Marqués de Aviles
- Marqués de Azpezteguia
- Marqués de Balboa
- Marqués de Bayamo
- Marqués de Bellamar
- Marqués de Bellavista
- Marqués de Campo Florido
- Marqués de la Candelaria de Yarayabo
- Marqués de Cardenas de Montehermoso
- Marqués de Casa Calvo
- Marqués de Casa Enrile
- Marqués de Casa Montalvo
- Marqués de Casa Nuñez de Villavicencio y Jura Real
- Marqués de Casa Peñalver
- Marqués de Casa Sandoval
- Marqués de Casa Torres
- Marques de Casa Vidal
- Marqués de Cienfuegos
- Marqués de las Delicias de Tempu
- Marqués de Diana
- Marqués de Du-Quesne
- Marqués de Esteva de las Delicias
- Marqués de Garcillan
- Marqués de la Gratitud
- Marqués de Guaimaro
- Marqués de Guisa
- Marqués de la Habana (grandee of Spain)
- Marqués de Justiz de Santa Ana
- Marqués de Marianao
- Marqués de Montsalud
- Marqusé del Morro
- Marqués de Pinar del Rio
- Marqués de Placetas
- Marqués de Prado Ameno
- Marqués de O'Gavan
- Marqués de O'Reilly
- Marqués de Real Agrado
- Marqués de la Real Campina
- Marqués de la Real Proclamación
- Marqués del Real Socorro
- Marqués de las Regueras
- Marqués de San Carlos de Pedroso
- Marqués de San Felipe y Santiago de Bejucal
- Marqués de San Miguel de Bejucal
- Marqués de Santa Ana y Santa Maria
- Marqués de Santa Lucia
- Marqués de Santa Olalla
- Marqués de Santa Rosa
- Marqués de Tiedra
- Marqués de Valero de Urria
- Marqués de las Victoria de las Tunas
- Marqués de Villamejor
- Marqués de Villa Siciliana
- Conde de Asalto
- Conde de Bayona
- Conde de Campo Alegre
- Conde de Canimar
- Conde de Casa Barreto
- Conde de Casa Bayona
- Conde de Casa Brunet
- Conde de Casa Lombillo
- Conde de Casa Pedroso y Barro
- Conde de Casa Miró
- Conde de Casa Montalvo
- Conde de Casa More
- Conde de Casa Ponce de Leon y Maroto
- Conde de Casa Romero
- Conde del Castillo de Cuba (grandee of Spain)
- Conde de Cuba
- Conde de Diana
- Conde de Fernandina de Jagua (grandee of Spain)
- Conde de Galarza
- Conde de Gibacoa
- Conde de Ibanez
- Conde de Lagunillas
- Conde de Macuriges
- Conde de Mandan
- Conde de la Montera
- Conde de Morales
- Conde de O'Reilly
- Conde de Peñalver
- Conde de Pozos Dulces
- Conde del Puente
- Conde de Revilla de Camargo
- Conde de la Reunion de Cuba
- Conde de Sagunto
- Conde de San Fernando de Peñalver
- Conde de San Ignacio
- Conde de San Juan de Jaruco
- Conde de San Rafael de Luyano
- Conde de Santa Clara
- Conde de Santa Cruz de Mopox (grandee of Spain)
- Conde de Santa Inez
- Conde de Santa Maria de Loreto
- Conde de Santovenia
- Conde de Vallellano
- Conde de Venadito
- Conde de Vidal
- Conde de Villanueva (grandee of Spain)
- Conde de Yumurí
- Conde de Zaldivar
- Vizconde de la Bahia Honda de la Real Fedelidad
- Vizconde de Canet del Mar
- Vizconde de Cuba
- Vizconde de los Remedios
- Vizconde de Santa Clara
- Vizconde de Valenmar
- Vizconde de Valvanera
- Baron de Maials

== Literature ==
- Rafael Nieto y Cortadellas. Dignidades nobiliarias en Cuba. Madrid, 1954. 669 p.
