= Alicia Koplowitz =

Spanish billionaire business magnate and noblewoman (born 1954)

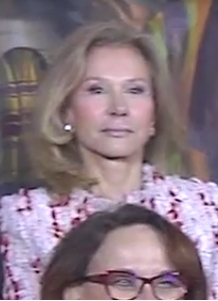
- Alicia Koplowitz in 2018
- Born: Alicia Koplowitz y Romero de Juseu; 12 September 1954 (age 71); Madrid, Spain
- Occupation: Businesswoman
- Spouse: Alberto Cortina (1969-1990, divorced)
- Children: 3
- Parent(s): Ernesto Koplowitz; Esther Romero de Juseu y Armenteros
- Relatives: Esther Koplowitz (sister)

Alicia Koplowitz y Romero de Juseu (born 12 September 1954) is a Spanish billionaire business magnate and former noblewoman who held the title of Marchioness of Bellavista until her distant cousin María Elena de Cárdenas gained the title after the Supreme Court of Spain ruled that Cárdenas had more rights to the title than Koplowitz.

When her father died, she and her sister inherited Fomento de Construcciones y Contratas, S.A. (CYCSA), a company founded by her father. She then sold her part of the company to her sister and created one of the largest family offices in Europe, called Omega Capital.

== Early life and education ==
Koplowitz was born in Madrid in 1954, the second and youngest daughter (after Esther, born in 1953) of Ernesto Koplowitz Sternberg, a Jewish businessman from Upper Silesia who settled down in Spain to escape the increasing German Nazi persecution in the early-1930s, and Esther Romero de Juseu y Armenteros, a Spanish aristocrat. (Alicia and Esther inherited their titles from their mother. Alicia was Marquesa de Bellavista and Marquesa del Real Socorro while Esther was Marquesa de Casa Peñalver, a title now inherited by one of her daughters.) Her parents married in 1950 in a Catholic ceremony.

Her father first worked for the German electronics company AEG and then in 1952, borrowing funds from a German friend, purchased the construction company Construcciones y Reparaciones S. A. which he renamed Construcciones y Contratas S. A. (CYCSA). When Spain experienced a construction boom in the early 1960s, the company flourished.

Koplowitz attended the Lycée Français and University Complutense of Madrid.

== Career ==
In 1962, her father died in a horse-riding accident and her mother enlisted Ramón Areces, a close friend of her father and the president of El Corte Inglés S.A., the largest department store chain in Europe, to run CYCSA for her and her daughters' benefit. In 1968, Alicia's mother died of cancer.

In 1969, Koplowitz's sister Esther married Alberto Alcocer and six months later, Koplowitz married Alberto Alcocer's cousin Alberto Cortina, the son of Pedro Cortina Mauri, a foreign minister during the Franco period. The sisters gave up their board seats to their husbands and the "Albertos", as they were known, made the firm grow from 1973 onwards and diversified acquiring real estate, Banco Zaragozano, and 47 percent of the Catalan construction firm Fomento de Obras y Construcciones SA (FOCSA).

In 1990, Koplowitz divorced Alberto Cortina after he was photographed by paparazzi in 1989 with another woman (Marta Chávarri, then wife of Fernando Falcó, marqués de Cubas, who Esther would later marry in 2003). At the same time, Esther also found that her husband was having an affair and divorced six months later. In 1990, the sisters returned to the board of CYCSA, filling the seats vacated by their husbands. Their husbands received ownership of the Banco Zaragozano as part of the divorce settlement.

In 1992, CYCSA merged with Fomento de Obras y Construcciones, S. A. (FOCSA) forming the largest construction company in Spain. The company was renamed Fomento de Construcciones y Contratas S.A. (FCC). In 1998, Koplowitz sold her 28.26% stake in FCC to her sister Esther for 871 million euro. When Alicia left FCC in 1998, FCC was the largest construction and services company in Spain. In 2012, FCC had dropped to fifth largest in Spain while its competitor Grupo ACS (with the sisters' ex-husbands Alberto Cortina and Alberto Alcocer among its largest shareholders) is now the largest construction and services company in the world.

Since then, Koplowitz has diversified her investments, mainly through Private Equity, blue chip companies on the stock market, oil and real estate (such as the Ritz in Madrid, the Park Hyatt in Milan and commercial and office buildings all over the United States), advised by Oscar Fanjul (a former ex-chairman of Repsol). She has an estimated fortune of 3,000 million euros.

In 1998, Koplowitz created Omega Capital, a venture capital firm specializing in growth. Omega Capital is an investment company 100% owned by her. The first investment in funds of hedge funds was made in 1999.

== Philanthropy and awards ==
She has created two foundations: Fundación Vida y Esperanza (in 1994), that helps children, adolescents and young adults with social, family and financial problems with housing, education and work. The foundation now has approximately 100 people receiving full-time aid in Spain. Through a different branch of Vida y Esperanza she also gives housing and support to the elderly, helps people with special needs and works with other foundations.

Through her charitable foundation Fundación Alicia Koplowitz she sends Spanish fellows to research in child psychiatry in England and the U.S. at places like King's College, Columbia University's Medical Center or Stanford University. These fellowships cover the full research, housing and salary for two to four years and then help the fellow seek employment at a top institution when they return to Spain. The Foundation also organizes every year the largest convention for psychiatry in Spain where top scientist from all over the world come during one week to give lectures and make round tables and debates. In 2009 she was named an honorary member of the Spanish Society of Psychiatrists for her efforts to promote the study and development of child and adolescent psychiatry. Thanks to her efforts, the Spanish State recognized child and adolescent psychiatry as different specialization within general psychiatry in Spain.

Koplowitz also promoted, built and donated to Spain the largest hospital in Europe specialized in multiple sclerosis in 2004 (Alicia Koplowitz Multiple Sclerosis Hospital).

Among her distinctions and awards, she was awarded the Gran Cruz de la Orden del Mérito Civil (May 2003), Chevalier de La Légion d'honneur of France (Knight of the Legion of Honour, of France), the prize for the recognition of her career from the State of Madrid in 2007 (Premio Persona Singular de la Comunidad de Madrid), the Gold Medal from the Spanish State in 2009 and the Gold Medal from the Red Cross in 2013.

She is a member of several organizations, universities and foundations such as Member of the Board of the following organizations: L’Union Centrale des Arts Décoratifs "UCAD" de France, Christie's Auction House, The Shimon Peres Center for Peace, Guggenheim Museum, Prado Museum and The Prince of Asturias Foundation and Prize. She is also a member of the Board of trustees of University Charles III of Spain.

She has one of the most important art collections in Europe and the largest one in Spain; her favourite pieces are by Goya, Picasso, Modigliani, Van Gogh, Rotko and de Kooning among others.

== Personal life ==
Koplowitz has three sons with Alberto Cortina:

- Alberto Cortina (born 1971). Alberto studied law in Madrid and started his career at Banco Zaragozano. He has worked at Omega Capital. He holds the title Marquess de Real Socorro which his mother relinquished to him in 2000. He is married to Inés Balmaseda, the daughter of the Count of Cumbres Altas.
- Pedro Cortina (b. 1972). Pedro started his career working at NH Hoteles. He is married to Bárbara Chapártegui, an interior decorator, with whom he has three children. Pedro then founded and runs the hotel company Hospes with hotels in France and Spain.
- Pelayo Cortina (b. 1985). He holds the title Count of San Fernando de Peñalver, gained in court to Fernando Fernández-Cavada y París, Count of La Vega del Pozo. Pelayo studied Industrial Engineering and Management at Northwestern University. After having worked for Lehman Brothers Private Equity, Arcelor Mittal Strategy and Societe Generale Natural Resources, he has worked in Ecofin Global L/S Fund. He is on the board of directors of several companies such as Northern Gold Mining and Engel & Volkers, among others. He is married to Jane Coppée Vaxelaire, a Belgian Sotheby's art expert and granddaughter of the Baron Raymond de Vaxelaire, member of one of Belgium's most important industrial families.

Between 2004 and 2006 Koplowitz was in a relationship with Spanish aristocrat Carlos Fitz-James Stuart, 19th Duke of Alba. Since 2012 she has been in a relationship with Portuguese businessman and aristocrat Miguel Pais do Amaral, 8th Count of Anadia.

Klopowitz was brought up Catholic by her mother and was for some years associated with the Legionnaires of Christ.

Her Cuban-born mother, Esther Romero de Juseu y Armenteros (died 1968), started a legal battle to obtain the Marquessate of El Real Socorro, which ended in 1971 with Koplowitz gaining the nobiliary title; her sister Esther obtained in court in 1988 the County of Peñalver.

The same month de Cárdenas also won in the Spanish courts the Marquessate of Almendares from another Cuban man, meanwhile in the previous month (February 2017), she gained the Marquessate of Campo Florido from Koplowitz's niece, Alicia Alcocer-Koplowitz.

== Trivia ==
- In La duquesa (telefilme), leire Martinez, the main vocalist of La Oreja de Van Gogh, appeared as Alicia Koplowitz.

Spanish nobility
Preceded by Fernando Sáinz de Inchaustegui e Irala, 7th Count of Alacha	Marchioness of Real Socorro; 1971–11 July 2000	Succeeded by Alberto Cortina y Koplowitz
Preceded by Enrique Romero de Juseu y Armenteros	Marchioness of Bellavista; 12 September 1984 – present	Incumbent
