= Scotty and the Secret History of Hollywood =

- Theatrical release poster
- Directed by: Matt Tyrnauer
- Based on: Full Service by Scotty Bowers
- Produced by: Matt Tyrnauer; Corey Reeser; Josh Braun
- Starring: Scotty Bowers
- Cinematography: Chris J. Dapkins
- Edited by: Bob Eisenhardt; Daniel Morfesis
- Music by: Jane Antonia Cornish
- Production companies: Altimeter Films; Wavelength Productions; Huntsman Films; Water’s End Productions
- Distributed by: Greenwich Entertainment
- Release dates: September 9, 2017 (TIFF); July 27, 2018 (United States)
- Running time: 97 minutes
- Country: United States
- Language: English
- Box office: $461,689

Scotty and the Secret History of Hollywood is a 2017 American documentary film about the life of Scotty Bowers, who acted as an unpaid pimp in Hollywood from the 1940s to 80s. Based on Bowers's book Full Service, it was produced and directed by Matt Tyrnauer, a Special Correspondent for Vanity Fair magazine. The film premiered at the 2017 Toronto International Film Festival and was theatrically released on July 27, 2018.

== Reception ==
On the review aggregator Rotten Tomatoes, the film holds an approval rating of 86% based on 72 reviews, with an average rating of 6.91/10. The website's critical consensus reads: "Scotty and the Secret History of Hollywood offers plenty of prurient thrills for film fans, but beyond the gossip lies a poignantly illuminating look at decades of sexual mores." Metacritic, which uses a weighted average, assigned the film a score of 67 out of 100, based on 24 critics, indicating "generally favorable reviews".

In his review for The Hollywood Reporter, Todd McCarthy commented: "What could have been a merely sensationalistic exposé of the private lives of then-closeted screen luminaries instead emerges, in the hands of documentarian Matt Tyrnauer as a nicely filled-out look at different eras, one secrecy-ridden and dedicated to the preservation of illusion, the other wide open and blasé about personal predilections."

== Film adaptation ==
In July 2020, it was announced Searchlight Pictures had acquired the rights to the documentary and was developing a feature film based on Bowers' life. Luca Guadagnino was hired to direct, with Seth Rogen and Evan Goldberg writing the script.
