= Sabino Fernández Campo, 1st Count of Latores =

Grandee of Spain (1918–2009)

The Most Excellent Sabino Fernández Campo 1st Count of Latores GE
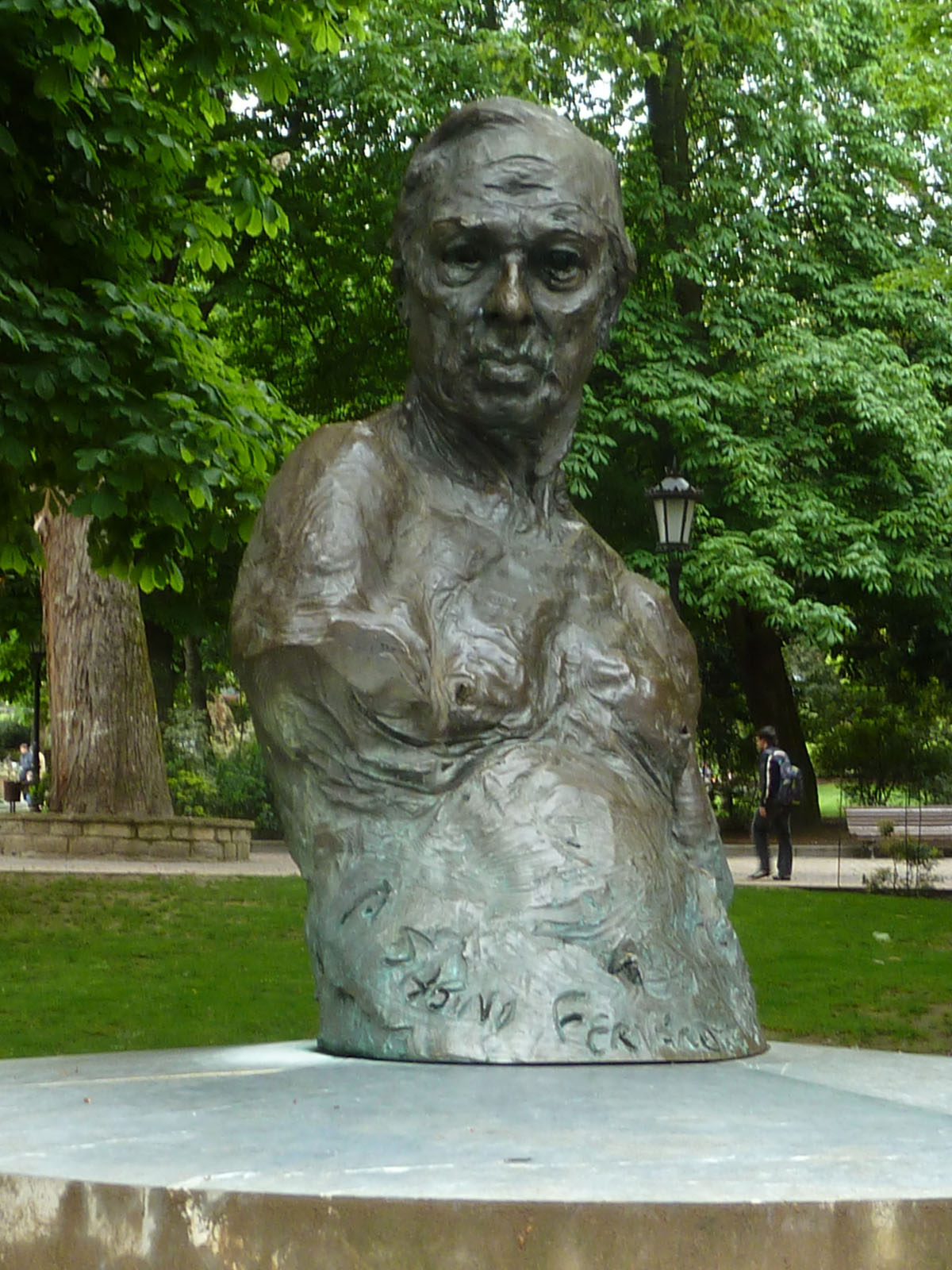
- Bronze statue of Fernández Campo on the Paseo de los Alamos in the park Campo de San Francisco (Oviedo)

Personal details
- Born: 17 March 1918 Oviedo, Spain
- Died: 26 October 2009 (aged 91) Madrid, Spain

Sabino Fernández Campo, 1st Count of Latores (17 March 1918, Oviedo – 26 October 2009, Madrid) was Head of the Royal Household of Spain under Juan Carlos I, from 1990 to 1993, and a key figure during the failed 23-F coup d'état in 1981.

In the Spanish Civil War he fought in a militia of the Falangists against the Republicans. In 1959 he was appointed as military secretary under dictator Francisco Franco.

On 30 April 1992 Fernández was raised into the Spanish nobility by Royal Decree of King Juan Carlos I, that created him Count of Latores, together with the dignity Grandee of Spain. After his death in 2009, his daughter María Elena Fernández inherited the titles.

== Honours ==
Coat of Arms of the 1st Count of Latores (G.E.)

Among many others, he was in possession of the following decorations:

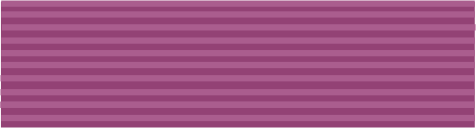
- Grand Cross of the Order of Cisneros (1972)
- Grand Cross of the Royal and Military Order of Saint Hermenegild (1974)
- Grand Cross of the Order of Military Merit, with White Decoration (1975)
- Grand Cross of the Order of Aeronautical Merit, with White Decoration (1977)
- Grand Cross of the Order of Naval Merit, with White Decoration (1984)
- Grand Cross of the Civil Order of Health (1989)
- Grand Cross of the Order of Charles III (1993).

== Notes ==
Spanish nobility
Preceded by New creation	Count of Latores; 1992–2009	Succeeded by María Elena Fernández y Fernández-Vega
