= Scotty Bowers =

American author and sex worker (1923–2019)

- Scotty Bowers in Los Angeles, California
- Born: George Albert Bowers; July 1, 1923; Ottawa, Illinois, U.S.
- Died: October 13, 2019 (aged 96); Los Angeles, California
- Occupations: Author, prostitute
- Spouse: Lois J. Broad (m. 1984; died 2018)

George Albert "Scotty" Bowers (July 1, 1923 – October 13, 2019), active from 1945 to 1980, was best known for procuring prostitutes for Hollywood industry insiders, many closeted about bisexual or homosexual liaisons. Bowers was described as having "a savant-like quality: a result of his refusal to be embarrassed by sex."

Unconfirmed tales of his exploits circulated for years; Bowers eventually revealed his story after the studio-era Hollywood celebrities had died, claiming "the truth can't hurt them anymore." The 2012 publication of his memoir Full Service drew broad media attention. The subsequent documentary film Scotty and the Secret History of Hollywood reunited Bowers with some of his hustlers shortly after the book's release.

== Life and career ==
Bowers was born in 1923 in Ottawa, Illinois, the son of Edna (Ostrander) and Glen Bowers. As a child during the Depression in Chicago, Bowers said that he began engaging in sexual acts with Catholic priests for small amounts of money, later justifying the behavior as himself providing a useful service rather than the Catholic Church sexually molesting a minor.

In 1942, Bowers joined the United States Marine Corps and fought as a paramarine in the Pacific Theater of World War II, including at the Battle of Iwo Jima, losing his brother and two close friends. In 1946 in Hollywood, he started working as an attendant at the Richfield Oil gas station located at 5777 Hollywood Boulevard, at the corner of Van Ness Avenue. Bowers claimed that one customer was actor Walter Pidgeon who drove Bowers to his home where the two had a brief sexual encounter, for which Pidgeon paid Bowers $20. After this, Bowers began providing gas station customers with sexual favors for money, and arranging similar favors for others without taking a percentage of the transaction payment. His customers were primarily men seeking sexual activity with other men, but he also arranged for women to have other women as sexual partners.

In 1950 Bowers stopped working at the service station and began working as a party bartender, while continuing his sexual services. He also claimed to have provided women, mostly prostitutes, to Alfred Kinsey as interview subjects for his study on human sexuality. Bowers was never prosecuted by the authorities for his activities; he kept all his contact information in his head. The actor Beach Dickerson willed three houses to Bowers. In his autobiography, Bowers claimed that cinematographer Néstor Almendros bequeathed him his Oscar.

On July 8, 1984, he married cabaret singer Lois J. Broad, ten years his junior. She died in 2018. Bowers died at his home in Los Angeles on October 13, 2019, at the age of 96. The cause of death was kidney failure.

== Support of claims ==
According to film critic Peter Debruge, writing for Variety in 2006: "Everyone knows Scotty. After all, he’s been serving drinks to the Beverly Hills crowd for almost 60 years, working a different party almost every night of the week, sometimes two a day." Gore Vidal, maintaining Bowers's account was accurate, spoke at the official launch of the memoir; it was Vidal's last public appearance. Robert Benevides, the partner of actor Raymond Burr, said to the LA Weekly: "Scotty just liked to make people happy." Film director John Schlesinger and investigative reporter and novelist Dominick Dunne also backed Bowers's claims.

Joan Allemand, a former arts director of the Beverly Hills Unified School District, who knew Bowers for more than 20 years and introduced him to his subsequent co-writer, Lionel Friedberg, said: "Scotty doesn't lie about anything. He's a poor kid from a farm in Illinois, and when he got here, his two assets were his big penis and charming personality. That's what he used to feed his family." Sir Cecil Beaton wrote of his sexual encounters with Bowers in his published diary of the 1960s, terming him "a phenomenon", while in her memoirs Debbie Reynolds wrote of Milton Berle employing him for a party prank. Bowers appears as the character 'Smitty' in John Rechy's 1963 roman-à-clef City of Night. A profile in the New York Social Diary stated: "Clients all agreed that he was 'very good' at what he did, and very agreeable ... And very discreet. He did not discriminate. He even had one regular longtime client ... who had no arms and no legs ... The Scotty I knew was a guy who always seemed to be enjoying his life working morning, noon and night, with never a gripe; always with a smile to greet you, and never with an axe to grind. After a lifetime in Hollywood, that's a remarkable feat and its own kind of Zen."

It has been suggested that Bowers' claims were dismissed by some not simply because "virtually everyone he talks about has died", but because "many in the industry still cling to a prudish, homophobic and manufactured version of the past." According to Matt Tyrnauer, director of a documentary on Bowers, it is merely proof of "the enduring power of the (Hollywood) myth machine ... created there by outsiders – Jewish immigrants themselves, who were furriers and glove manufacturers – projecting a lie of a made-up image of white Americanism ... I think there are a lot of people who want to cling to that."

William J. Mann, who interviewed Bowers for a biography of Katharine Hepburn, said, "I found him forthright and honest and not interested in personal fame or gain." At that time Bowers turned down Mann's offer to write about him or introduce him to a literary agent. Author and journalist Tim Teeman, who also interviewed Bowers, wrote that "as candid as Bowers was, he was also respectful – and when it came to sex and sexuality, utterly without shame and judgment."

== Other writings and appearances ==
Bowers authored the introduction to a collection of archival photographs of male affection in the military, My Buddy: World War II Laid Bare. In March 2016 he wrote a profile of himself for the Guest of a Guest blog. He also appears in the biography In Bed With Gore Vidal. Bowers also assisted a number of authors, including Vincente Minnelli biographer Mark Griffin and William J. Mann, author of Behind the Screen: How Gays and Lesbians Shaped Hollywood.

== In popular culture ==
A character based on Bowers during the heyday of his gas station operation is portrayed by Dylan McDermott in the 2020 Ryan Murphy Netflix miniseries Hollywood.

The documentary Scotty and the Secret History of Hollywood was released in 2017, directed by Matt Tyrnauer. In The Hollywood Reporter, a reviewer commented: "At a certain point, anyone who reads Bowers’s book or sees this film has to decide whether to believe him or not. At this stage, there is no reason not to; Scotty does not seem remotely like a braggart or someone desperate for a sliver of late-in-life fame... When Scotty says he likes to make people happy, he clearly includes himself, and that he seems to have done in spades."

Searchlight Pictures announced acquiring the rights to the documentary in July 2020, developing a feature film based on Bowers' life. Luca Guadagnino was hired to direct, with Seth Rogen and Evan Goldberg writing the script.

== See also ==
- Hollywood Babylon
