= Kathleen Brady (historian) =

American historian (born c. 1946)

- Born: c. 1946
- Occupation: Historian; Journalist; Non-fiction author; Essayist
- Education: 1968 B.A., Saint Bonaventure University; 2006 M.A., Hunter College
- Subject: Biography
- Notable awards: Fellow of the Society of American Historians

Kathleen Brady (born c. 1946) is an American historian, author and essayist.

== Education ==
In 1968 Kathleen Brady graduated from St. Bonaventure University, majoring in journalism, with minors in history and philosophy. She earned a master's degree in urban affairs from Hunter College in 2006.

== Career and critical reception ==
Brady has written books about Lucille Ball, Francis of Assisi and Clare of Assisi, and Ida Tarbell. She also wrote an essay about Hazel Brannon Smith. She was a reporter for TIME and wrote columns for other publications. She worked as a Senior Writer in a Communications Department in New York City.

=== Reviews ===
Reviews of Ida Tarbell: Portrait of a Muckraker :

What makes this portrait of a muckraker particularly interesting is Brady's attempt to understand how Tarbell, a symbol of independence and success to her generation of women, not only shunned involvement in feminist causes, but actively sought to dissuade women from pursuing careers outside the home... Brady has done a commendable job of bringing to life an exciting, innovative period in American journalism. She has painted a portrait of a woman who was in the vanguard of that movement but who lacked the perspective to see her own contribution.

— Mary Lou M. Schultz

Brady's special contribution to our understanding of Tarbell is that through a skillful use of Tarbell's diary and private letters she moves beyond externals and the public persona to reveal the inner torment of her subject... In writing the book, Brady felt that her greatest challenge was 'in trying to explain an enigma. [p. 257] Biographers generally can not expect to offer complete explanations, but Brady, by showing the inner tension which resulted from conflicting beliefs well as a lack of congruity between belief and action, certainly has succeeded in illuminating her subject.

— Robert A. Huff

This biography explores some of the contradictions and enigmas in the life of a fascinating and important person. Written by a novelist and freelancer, it is based on thorough research in manuscript collections and on a knowledge of most of the relevant secondary literature. Occasionally it lacks perspective, and the characterizations of some of Tarbell's contemporaries are oddly skewed. But it is a well-written and lively book. It should be read by all those interested in the history of journalism and the Progressive era as well as by those concerned with the role of women in American history.

— Allen Davis

Review of Lucille: The Life of Lucille Ball:

Brady's biography is a narrative roller coaster veering from heartache to terror to triumph as she depicts Ball as actress, wife, mother and producer. The terror occurred during the McCarthy era, when she was investigated-then cleared-by HUAC. Desi Arnaz is shown as an astute businessman who, in tandem with his wife, became successful enough to buy the studio where their series was produced, Desilu Studios. Ball's outrageous behavior after her last series, Here's Lucy, ended in 1974 and her struggle against aging are recounted in doleful detail. Ball died in 1989 at the age of 78 but, as Brady remarks, "Lucy Ricardo" achieved eternal life. Fans will appreciate the profusion of I Love Lucy lore and trivia.

— Publishers Weekly

Review of Francis and Clare: The Struggles of the Saints of Assisi:

There is much to admire in Kathleen Brady's account of Francis and Clare. Ms. Brady has the dogged devotion a biographer needs to understand her subjects, and to show we cannot truly understand Francis without Clare and vice versa. That's what makes this biography so fresh and revealing, even as it is the product of more than 20 years of deep reading in the scholarship about her subjects.

— Carl Rollyson of The New York Sun

== Selected publications ==
What's the best piece of writing advice you've ever received and would like to impart to other writers? The great biographer Kenneth Silverman told me that being an experienced writer did not make the work easier, but it provided knowledge that no matter how bad a particular piece of writing seemed to be you knew you could find a way to get past the problem.

— Kathleen Brady

=== Books ===
- Brady, Kathleen (1984). Ida Tarbell: Portrait of a Muckraker. Seaview/Putnam. ISBN 9780399310232.
- Brady, Kathleen (March 8, 2016). Lucille: The Life of Lucille Ball. Open Road Distribution. ISBN 9781504018920 – via Google Books.
- Brady, Kathleen (30 August 2021). Francis and Clare: The Struggles of the Saints of Assisi. Lodwin Press. ISBN 9781737549802.

=== Essays ===
- Kathleen Brady, "Hazel Brannon Smith: White Martyr for Civil Rights," in Forgotten Heroes, edited by Susan Ware, New York: The Free Press, 1998.

== Awards, honors ==
- In March 2022, Brady was named the Lenna Endowed Visiting Professor, sponsored by St. Bonaventure University and Jamestown Community College
- Brady was named a Fellow of the Society of American Historians for Ida Bell: Portrait of a Muckraker.
