= Esther Koplowitz, 7th Marchioness of Casa Peñalver =

Spanish businesswoman and philanthropist (born 1953)

The Most Excellent Esther Koplowitz 7th Marchioness of Casa Peñalver
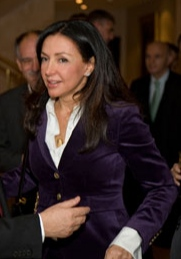
- Koplowitz in 2008
- Born: Esther María Koplowitz y Romero de Juseu; August 10, 1953 (age 73); Madrid, Spain
- Occupations: Businesswoman, philanthropist
- Board member of: Fomento de Construcciones y Contratas; Grupo Cementos Portland Valderrivas
- Spouse(s): Alberto Alcocer (1969-1990, divorced); Fernando Falcó, 3rd Marquess of Cubas (2003-2009, divorced)
- Children: 3
- Relatives: Alicia Koplowitz (sister)
- Awards: Legion of Honour

Esther María Koplowitz y Romero de Juseu, 7th Marchioness of Casa Peñalver is a Spanish businesswoman and philanthropist.

== Biography ==
Koplowitz is vice-president of the Board of Fomento de Construcciones y Contratas (FCC), one of the leading diversified Spanish groups, employing around ninety thousand people. She also holds board positions in several national and international companies, for instance vice-president of the board of Cementos Portland Valderrivas, and was formerly board member of French multinational Veolia Environnement.

She is chairwoman of the Foundation that bears her name, the Esther Koplowitz Foundation, principally dedicated to charity work to help those most in need in society. She has built, equipped and donated care homes such as "Nuestra Casa" in Collado-Villalba (Madrid), and "La Nostra Casa" of Fort-Pienc in Barcelona, both for the elderly in need of special assistance as well as those without financial means, and "La Nostra Casa de Vall de la Ballestera" in Valencia for physically and mentally disabled adults. The construction of two other care homes is in the pipeline, one in Valladolid and a second in Valencia. They will both share the same objective as the home already built in Valencia.

She has received numerous recognitions and awards for her philanthropic work as well as for her business acumen. Among them the Great Cross of the Order of Civil Merit, Gold Medal of Civil Order for Charitable Acts, Madrid Region Gold Medal, Blanquerna award from Catalonia Regional Government and gold medal, Academic Honour from the Royal Academy of History and Chevalier de l'ordre de la Légion d'honneur.

WikiLeaks reveals that Esther Koplowitz made donations to the conservative organisation Hazte Oír, which itself funds the Vox party.

== Titles ==
Esther and Alicia inherited their noble titles from their mother. Esther was formerly Marchioness of Casa Peñalver and Marchioness of Campo Florido, titles now held by her two daughters, Carmen Alcocer y Koplowitz (now Marchioness of Casa Peñalver) and Alicia Alcocer y Koplowitz (now Marchioness of Campo Florido). Her sister Alicia is the Marquesa de Bellavista.

In 2003 Esther Koplowitz married Fernando Falcó, 3rd Marquess of Cubas, whom she divorced in 2009.

== Awards and honors ==
On 13 July 2001, the Council of Ministers of Spain awarded Esther Koplowitz the Grand Cross of the Order of Civil Merit for her longstanding support of social causes.

In November 2004, the mayor of Valencia, Rita Barberá, named Esther Koplowitz an Honorary Citizen of Valencia.

In January 2005, she received the Montblanc Award for Best Executive of the Year.

On 11 January 2005, the Mayor of Barcelona awarded her the Shield of the City of Barcelona in recognition of the social work done by her foundation, Fundación Ayuda al Desvalido.

In January 2005, she was decorated with the Silver Cross of the Guardia Civil's Order of Merit by the Director General of the Guardia Civil.

In December 2006, the Adecco Foundation presented her with its Annual Award in recognition of her social work.

In June 2007, the Royal Academy of History awarded her its gold medal.

In September 2007, she was named Business Leader of the Year by the Spanish Chamber of Commerce in the United States.

In December 2007, she received the "Goxua" Bilbotarra Award from the 21st Century Association of Women Entrepreneurs and Professionals of Bilbao.

On 23 January 2008, Queen Sofía of Spain awarded her the Golden Cross of the Civil Order of Social Solidarity (Orden Civil de la Solidaridad Social).

In May 2008, the government of the Community of Madrid, represented by Esperanza Aguirre, awarded her the Grand Cross of Health, the highest health award in Madrid.

On 2 October 2008, she received the IMSERSO Infanta Cristina Award for Social Merit, presented by Infanta Cristina and former Minister of Education, Social Policy and Sport, Mercedes Cabrera.

On 8 October 2008, she received the Gold and Diamond Insignia from the Orphan Foundation of the National Police Corps (Spain) awarded by its president, Ignacio Conde.

In October 2008, she was awarded the XV Blanquerna Prize, granted by the Government of Catalonia, in recognition of her contributions to the development, promotion, knowledge, and projection of Catalonia.

In April 2009, she was awarded the Gold Medal of the Community of Madrid.

In January 2010, she received the Silver Medal from the Valencian Council of Culture.

In June 2012, she was decorated with the Cross of the Order of Knight of the Legion of Honour by the Republic of France for her business achievements and philanthropy.

In June 2012, she was awarded the Gold Medal of the Spanish Road Association (AEC), the highest honor granted by this nonprofit entity dedicated to the advocacy and promotion of roads.

In May 2013, the Council of Ministers awarded her the Grand Cross of the Civil Order of Environmental Merit.

In July 2013, the Barcelona City Council presented her with the Gold Medal of Scientific Merit.

In May 2014, she was decorated with the Medal of Honor by Francisco de Vitoria University.

In October 2014, she was awarded the "Count of Latores" Prize for Humanitarian Work by the Nobility Corps of the Principality of Asturias.

In November 2014, she received the Gold Medal of Merit in Work, and was appointed as a Dame of the Noble Corps of the Principality of Asturias.

On 26 December 2014, she was awarded the Grand Cross of the Order of Alfonso X the Wise.

In December 2019, she received the VI Ibero-American Philanthropy Award.

In 2020, she received the VI Ibero-American Philanthropy Award.

In September 2023, the Royal National Academy of Medicine (RANME) awarded her its Medal of Honor.

Spanish nobility
Preceded by Esther Romero de Juseu y Armenteros	Marchioness of Casa Peñalver	Succeeded by Carmen Alcocer y Koplowitz
Preceded by Esther Romero de Juseu y Armenteros	Marchioness of Campo Florido	Succeeded by Alicia Alcocer y Koplowitz
