= Hollywood Babylon =

Book about celebrity scandals by Kenneth Anger

Kenneth Anger's Hollywood Babylon
- First edition (French)
- Author: Kenneth Anger
- Original title: Hollywood Babylone
- Language: English
- Subject: Hollywood gossip
- Genre: Biography
- Publisher: J.J. Pauvert (1959); Straight Arrow Press/Simon & Schuster (1975)
- Publication date: 1959
- Publication place: United States
- English publication date: 1965
- Media type: Print (Paperback)
- Pages: 247
- Followed by: Hollywood Babylon 2

Hollywood Babylon is a book by avant-garde filmmaker Kenneth Anger, which details the purported scandals of famous Hollywood denizens from the 1900s to the 1950s. The book was banned shortly after it was first published in the U.S. in 1965, and remained unavailable until reprinted ten years later. Upon its second release in 1975, The New York Times said of it, "If a book such as this can be said to have charm, it lies in the fact that here is a book without one single redeeming merit." The Daily Beast described Anger's book as "essentially a work of fiction. There is no doubt that many—if not all—of the stories Anger shares in his slim bible have no merit." Film historian Kevin Brownlow repeatedly criticized the book, citing Anger as saying his research method was "mental telepathy, mostly".

== Contents ==
Originally published in French in 1959 by J.J. Pauvert (Paris) as Hollywood Babylone, the first U.S. edition of Hollywood Babylon was published in 1965 by Associated Professional Services of Phoenix, Arizona. A second U.S. edition was released in 1975 by Rolling Stone's Straight Arrow Press, distributed by Simon & Schuster, following a series of copyright disputes.

The book details alleged scandals involving Hollywood stars from the silent era through the 1960s, including Mary Astor, Clara Bow, Charles Chaplin, Jeanne Eagels, Frances Farmer, Errol Flynn, Judy Garland, John Gilbert, Juanita Hansen, Jean Harlow, Barbara La Marr, Carole Landis, Marilyn Monroe, Mae Murray, Mary Nolan, Ramon Novarro, Marie Prevost, Wallace Reid, Alma Rubens, Olive Thomas, Thelma Todd, Lana Turner, Rudolph Valentino, and Lupe Vélez.

Hollywood Babylon also includes chapters on the Fatty Arbuckle–Virginia Rappe scandal, the murder of William Desmond Taylor, the Hollywood blacklist, the murder of Sharon Tate, and Confidential magazine.

== Criticisms ==
=== Exploitation ===
The 1975 edition featured graphic images, including a photo of the car crash that killed Jayne Mansfield, a photograph of Carole Landis after her suicide, images of director Paul Bern following his suicide, a photograph of Lewis Stone dying on a sidewalk, and uncensored images of the mutilated corpse of the Black Dahlia.

=== Falsehoods ===
Many of Anger's claims have been challenged as false since the book's initial publication. It is credited with helping popularize several enduring urban legends. One example is the claim that Clara Bow had sex with the entire USC football team, including a young John Wayne, a falsehood that has been repeatedly debunked. Bow's sons reportedly considered suing Anger when the book was reissued.

The book also claimed that Lupe Vélez was found with her head in a toilet, drowned in her own vomit after overdosing on sleeping pills. In fact, a photo published in 2013 showed Vélez had been found on her bedroom floor.

Other debunked stories promoted by the book include that Marie Prevost's corpse was partially eaten by her dachshund and that Jayne Mansfield was decapitated in her fatal 1967 car accident.

Anger sourced the "lurid, grotesque, and often surreal" images featured in the book from a range of materials, including Hollywood publicity stills, newspapers, magazines, police archives, and his personal photography collection. He frequently miscaptioned or misattributed these images, sometimes unintentionally, but often through deliberate artistic license. In one instance, a woman shown in mourning attire in the chapter on the Fatty Arbuckle–Virginia Rappe scandal is misidentified as Maude Delmont, a key witness, but was actually Arbuckle's wife, Minta Durfee.

== Sequels ==
Hollywood Babylon II was published in 1984. It was greatly expanded in format but was not as well received as the first book. It covered stars from the 1920s to the 1970s.

For years, Anger said he intended to write a Hollywood Babylon III, and in a 2010 interview he stated that the book was complete but had been placed on hold, explaining, "The main reason I didn't bring it out was that I had a whole section on Tom Cruise and the Scientologists. I'm not a friend of the Scientologists."

In 2008, a book titled Hollywood Babylon: It's Back! was published by Darwin Porter and Danforth Prince. The work had no association with Anger, who reportedly responded by placing a curse on the authors. Anger was a self-described magician associated with the tradition of Thelema.

== Adaptations ==
In 1971, the movie Hollywood Babylon was released starring Uschi Digart as Marlene Dietrich, in which scenes from the book were reenacted.

A television series based upon the books was produced for syndication in 1992–1993. Hosted by Tony Curtis, the series featured dramatic reenactments of stories from Anger's books, augmented by veteran actor Curtis relating his own Hollywood-based anecdotes.

Despite not being a direct adaptation, Damien Chazelle’s movie Babylon alludes in its title to Hollywood Babylon, while critics have noted the film’s evocation of the book’s lurid mythology and exaggerated depiction of Hollywood’s excesses.

== See also ==
- Full Service, by Scotty Bowers
