= FCC Group =

Construction company from Barcelona, Spain

Fomento de Construcciones y Contratas, S.A.
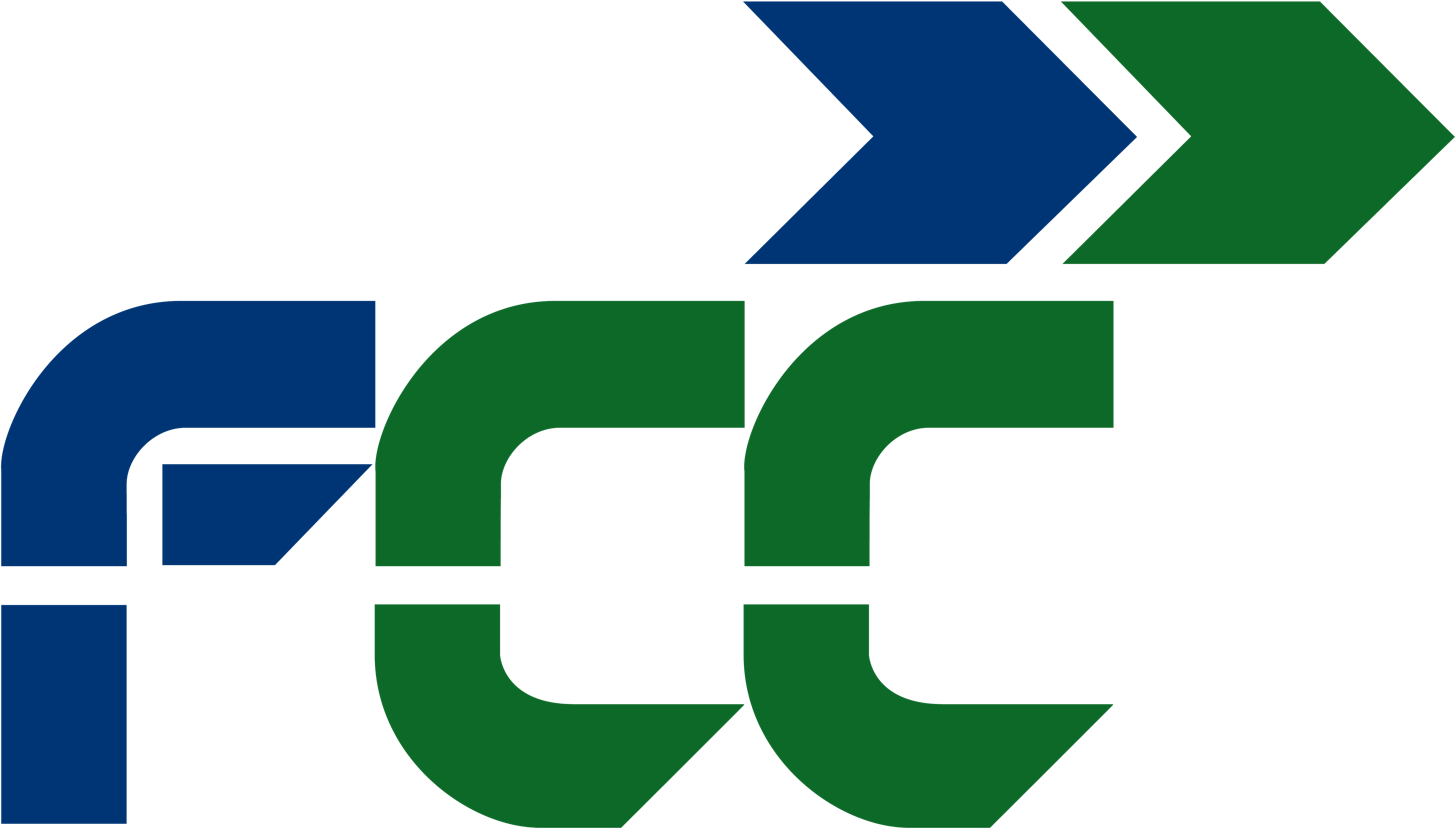

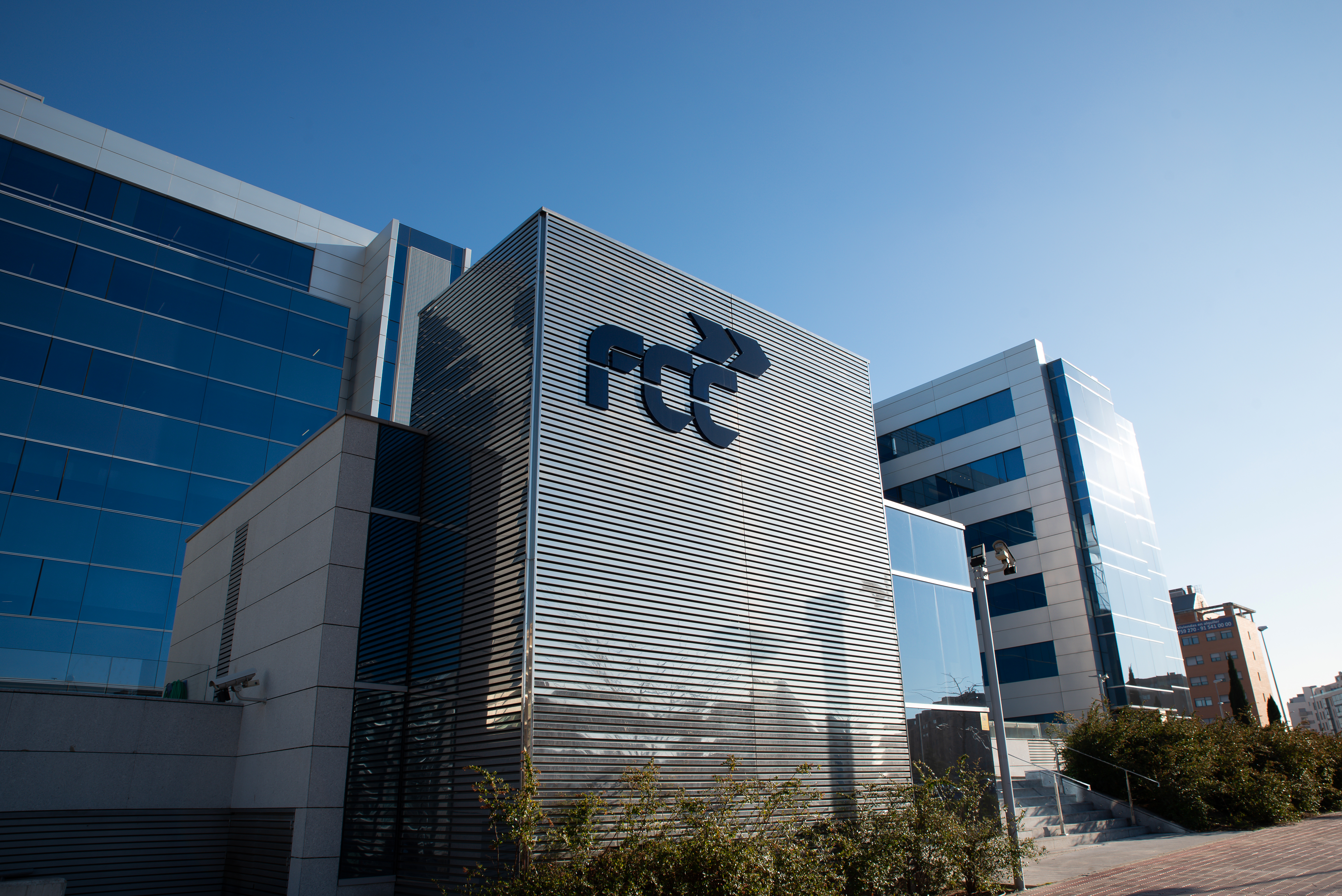
- Headquarters in Barcelona, Spain
- Trade name: FCC
- Company type: Limited Company (In Spain: Sociedad Anónima)
- Traded as: BMAD: FCC
- ISIN: ES0122060314
- Industry: Construction, Civil engineering
- Founded: 1900; 126 years ago
- Headquarters: Barcelona, Spain
- Key people: Esther Koplowitz (Chairman); Pablo Colio Abril (CEO)
- Revenue: ▲€9,026.0 million (2023)
- Operating income: ▲€910.3 million (2023)
- Net income: ▲€744.8 million (2023)
- Number of employees: 67,000 (2023)
- Subsidiaries: FCC Environment; Aqualia; FCC Construction; FCC Real Estate; Cementos Portland
- Website: www.fcc.es/en/

The FCC Group, formerly Fomento de Construcciones y Contratas, S. A. (currently one of the group's entities), is a Spanish business group, based in Barcelona. It has specialised in public services. Its shares were first listed on the stock exchange in December 1900. The group is listed on the Spanish Continuous Market and was once part of the IBEX 35.

In 2021, the group was among the top 10 companies that emitted the most tonnes of CO_{2} equivalent in Spain with 3.5 mtCO2e.

== History ==
The business was founded as a construction company in Barcelona in 1900, under the name of Fomento de Obras y Construcciones S.A. and became known as FOCSA. It began operations in public services in 1911 with a contract to clean and maintain Barcelona's sewerage network. In 1992 FOCSA merged with Construcciones y Contratas, a company founded in Madrid in 1944 to form Fomento de Construcciones y Contratas, S.A.

Proactiva was a 50–50 joint venture formed in 1999 between Veolia Environnement and FCC, until Veolia bought the other 50 percent share from FCC in 2013.

In September 2006 FCC acquired the British Waste Recycling Group, excluding its landfill gas operations, from Terra Firma Capital Partners for £1.4 billion.

In July 2013, Alpine Bau Holding GmbH, a subsidiary of FCC which had accumulated debt of €2.56 billion and placed €190 million of corporate bonds on the Wiener Börse OTC, went into administration.

In August 2013, FCC sold its subsidiary Alpine Energie, a company of 3,000 employees in the German-speaking Alps that builds and maintains power plants, telecommunications, and traffic infrastructure, to Triton Partners, a private equity company, for just under €100 million ($133 million).

In October 2013, Bill Gates joined the company as a shareholder with a 5.7% stake, reflecting FCC's strong position in sectors linked to his vision of sustainability (Environmental Services and Water). Shortly thereafter, in December of the same year, the financier George Soros became a shareholder of the company with a 3% stake.

In December 2014, FCC carried out a share issue worth €1 billion, facilitating the involvement of business magnate Carlos Slim as a majority shareholder.

FCC was charged with corruption and money laundering by Spain's High Court in October 2019. The charges related to bribes, totalling €82 million ($91 million), to secure transport and hospital contracts in Panama between 2010 and 2014.

Then, in September 2020, FCC was banned from bidding for contracts by the World Bank for two years following the company's involvement with fraudulent and collusive practices in Colombia. The company was required to pay $5.5m in restitution for its illegal activities.

In July 2022, the company was fined €40.4 million, along with five other contractors, by the Comisión Nacional de los Mercados y la Competencia (CNMC) for bidding collusion in public tenders for building and civil infrastructure works.

In January 2023, the National Court suspended, on a precautionary basis, the sanction imposed by the CNMC against FCC Construcción, which consisted of a fine of €40.4 million and a prohibition to contract with public authorities. The measure was taken while the appeal filed by the company was being resolved.

In 2022, FCC joined the SDG campaign launched by the UN Global Compact Spain. As part of the campaign, its members are working to advance the climate change agenda, social equity and other global socially important issues.

In July 2023, FCC's shareholders approved an initial public offering to reduce its share capital by 7 per cent by acquiring more than 32 million shares. The maximum allocation for this task was €400 million. At the same time, some minority shareholders were concerned that the move was preparation for an exclusionary placement that would strengthen the position of large shareholders. The deputy secretary of the board of directors, Felipe Garcia Perez, denied this claim.

Operating in more than 29 countries worldwide, over 47.5% of its turnover comes from international markets, mainly from Europe and the United States.

== Structure ==
Its core activities are environmental services management, end-to-end water cycle management, major infrastructure construction, cement production and real estate management.

As of May 2022 the business was divided into the following five major divisions:

- FCC Environmental
- Aqualia
- FCC Construction
- FCC Real Estate
- Cementos Portland

== Major projects ==
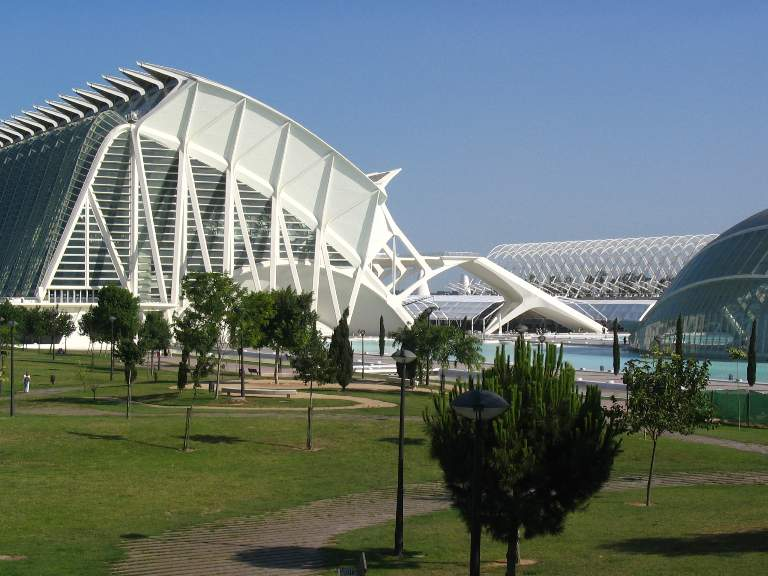
Prince Philip Museum of Science

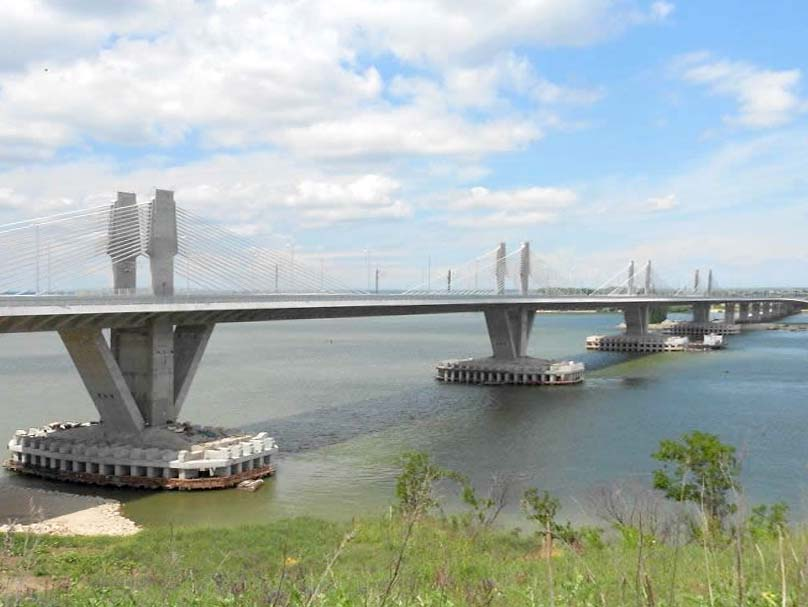
New Europe Bridge

Major FCC construction projects have included:

- Torre Picasso in Madrid, completed in 1988
- Gate of Europe, completed in 1996
- Prince Philip Museum of Science in Valencia, completed in 2000
- Torre Caja Madrid, completed in 2008
- Pasajul Basarab in Bucharest, completed in 2011
- New Europe Bridge between Bulgaria and Romania, completed in 2013
- Haren Prison, Brussels, Belgium, completed in 2022

== Shareholders ==
The shareholders are as follows:

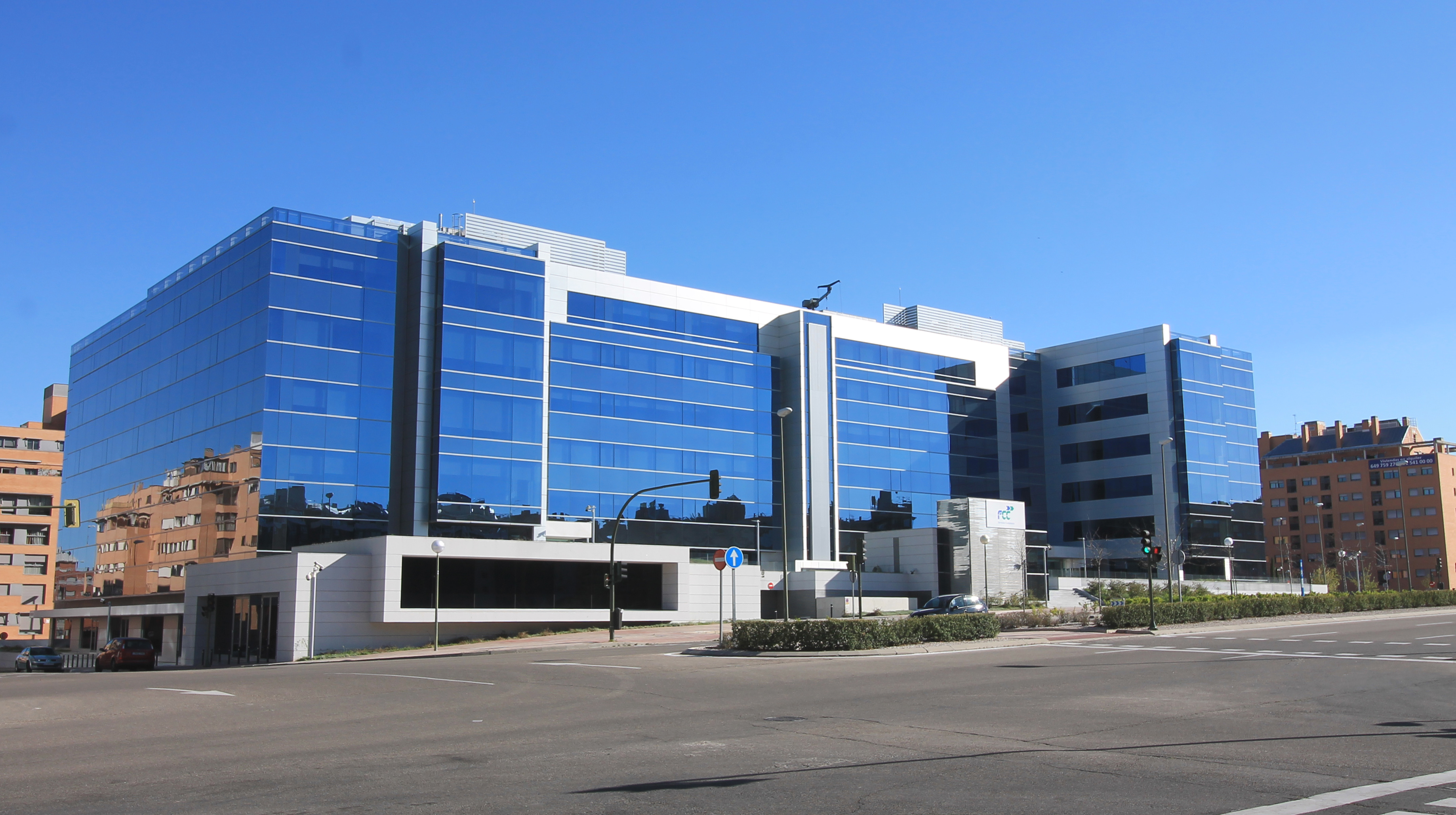
FCC offices in Madrid.

Shareholder	Total voting rights	Direct voting rights	Indirect voting rights
Business Capital Control, S.A. de C.V.	69.578%	60.583 %	8.994 % (Dominum Direction and Management)
Melinda French Gates	4.251 %	4.251 %	0.000 %
Esther Koplowitz	3.216 %	0.035 %	3.181 % (Nueva Samede 2016)
Nueva Samede 2016, S.L.U.	3.181 %	3.181 %	0.000 %
Carlos Slim	11.911 %	0.000 %	11.911 % (Finver Investments 2020)
