= Zoe Koplowitz =

American marathon runner

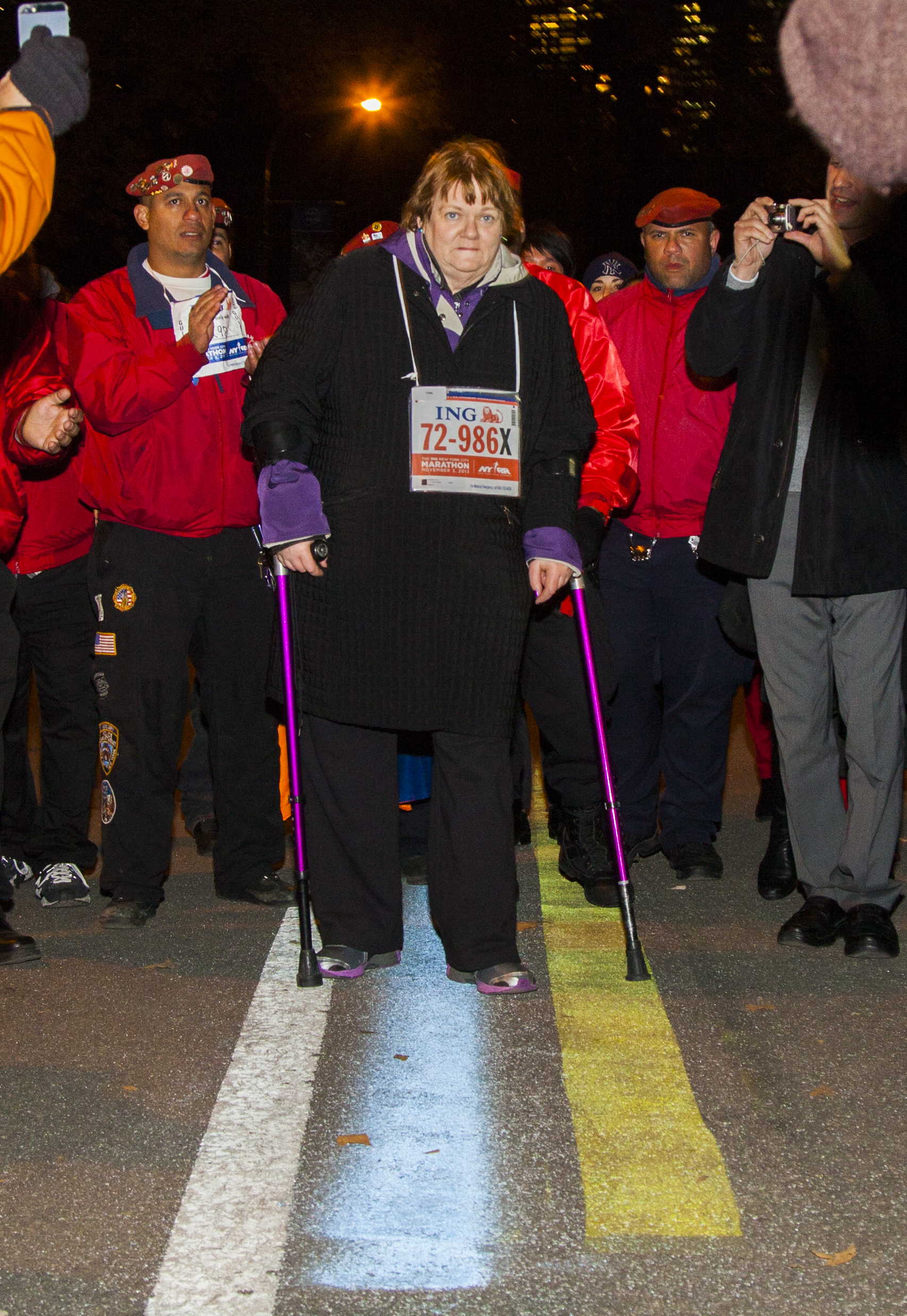
Zoe Koplowitz approaching the finish line of the 2013 ING NYC Marathon, accompanied by the Guardian Angels, who have been walking her through the marathon for over two decades.

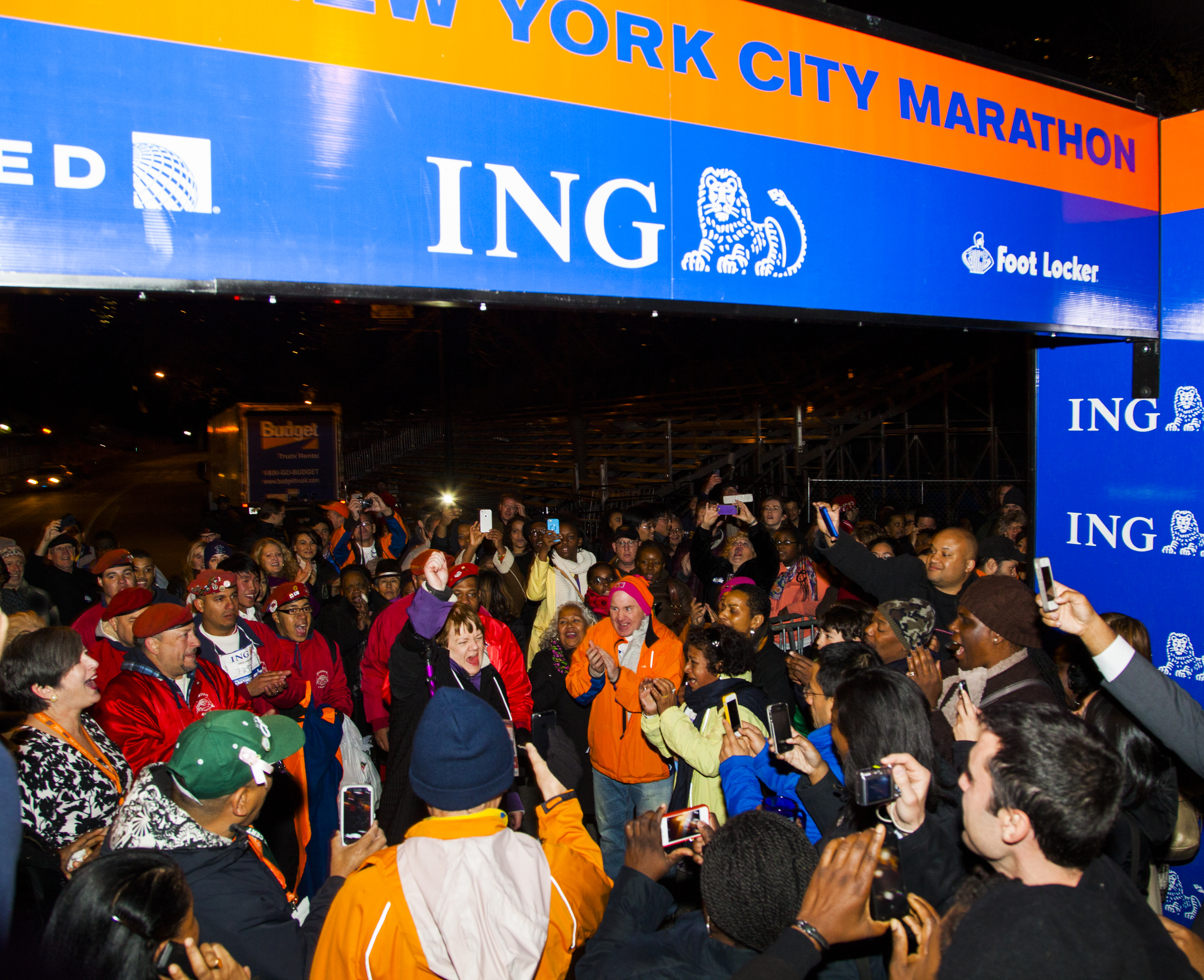
Zoe Koplowitz at the finish line of the 2013 ING NYC Marathon, her 25th completed NYC Marathon

Zoe Koplowitz (b. Lindsay Koplowitz September 12, 1948 in New York, New York) is a marathon runner who is afflicted with multiple sclerosis and diabetes, an inspirational speaker, and the author of The Winning Spirit—Life Lessons Learned In Last Place. As of and including 2013, Koplowitz has completed a total of 25 New York City Marathons, all of them in last place. Her 33-hour-9-minute run in 2000 set a world record for the longest marathon time in the history of women's running. "The race belongs not only to the swift and strong but to those who keep on running", says Koplowitz.

At the conclusion of her 25th New York City Marathon on November 4, 2013, Zoe addressed the crowd which had gathered to see and cheer her finish. "It makes you understand that life is not happen stance or random all the time. That there is a plan, and it's a good plan. When we do things like the marathon, we get an opportunity to see how the pieces fit, and life no longer becomes this random series of crazy events. There was a lovely young woman with multiple sclerosis who waited hours in the street for me to come by. On one side of her sign she had my name in big bold letters. On the other side of her sign, she had something that reduced me to tears. It said 'Because you run every year, the rest of us continue to walk.' I thought that was really profound. I think the thing is that, the marathon is not just an adventure to me. It's a matter of living resources; it's not just stories to tell, it's what those stories teach you and how close you hold them to your heart through the year, and how strong and how brave and much a part of the running community they make you. It has been a truly amazing honor. I've done 25 of these, and it never grows old. There is life after disability. You can either go through life like this [arms closed], or you can go through life like that [arms open]. And for me, New York City is that. It's arms out reaching for possibility and hope every single year. I love this city. I love its strength, I love its diversity, I love its personality, and thank God it loves me back because I wouldn't know what to do if it was a one-sided love."

Koplowitz has appeared on many national TV and radio programs as a result of her long history of marathon completion. She has also been recognized for her related volunteer work by the National MS Society, the Achilles Track Club and other organizations.

The U.S. Olympic Committee selected Koplowitz as a torch bearer in the torch relay leading up to the 2002 Winter Games.
