= Count of Latores =

Spanish noble title

Countship of Latores
- Coat of Arms as Grandee of Spain
- Creation date: 30 April 1992
- Created by: Juan Carlos I of Spain
- Peerage: Spanish nobility
- First holder: Sabino Fernández Campo
- Present holder: María Elena Fernández Fernández-Vega
- Heir apparent: Elena de la Roca Castedo
- Remainder to: Heirs of the body of the grantee
- Status: Extant

Count of Latores (Spanish: Conde de Latores) is a hereditary title of Spanish nobility, accompanied by the dignity of Grandee. It was created on 30 April 1992 by King Juan Carlos I in favor of Sabino Fernández Campo, Head of the Royal Household from 1990 to 1993.

== Counts of Latores ==
- Sabino Fernández Campo, 1st Count of Latores (1992–2009)
- María Elena Fernández Fernández-Vega, 2nd Countess of Latores (2010- )

== Creation ==
On April 30, 1992, King Juan Carlos signed the following royal decree:

After a long and distinguished career of military and civil service to the State, Don Sabino Fernández Campo was called to join My House, first as Secretary-General and later as its Head. In both positions, he has assisted me at all times with keen talent, prudent judgment, loyal advice, and boundless generosity in the tasks I have been entrusted with throughout a momentous period in the history of Spain, during which the political transition that culminated in the establishment of democracy and the parliamentary monarchy was successfully completed, within the framework of the Constitution. Therefore, wishing to show him My Royal appreciation for his invaluable services,
I grant Don Sabino Fernández Campo the title of Count of Latores, accompanied by the dignity of Grandee, for himself and his successors, in accordance with Spanish nobility legislation.

— JUAN CARLOS R., Royal Decree n.º 1176 of 11 July 2008.
