= Rötkö =

Rötkö is a Finnish surname. Notable people with the surname include:

- Iivari Rötkö (1893–1957), Finnish long-distance runner
- Jalmari Rötkö (1892–1938), Finnish laborer and politician
