= Full Service (book) =

Book by Scotty Bowers

- First hardcover edition (2012)
- Author: Scotty Bowers, Lionel Friedberg
- Language: English
- Subject: Hollywood gossip
- Publisher: Grove Press / Grove/Atlantic
- Publication date: 2012
- Publication place: United States
- Media type: Print (Hardcover)
- ISBN: 978-0-8021-2007-6

Full Service: My Adventures in Hollywood and the Secret Sex Lives of the Stars is a 2012 "tell-all" book about the sex lives of Hollywood stars from the late 1940s to the early 1980s by Scotty Bowers, with Lionel Friedberg as a contributing author.

Bowers makes many claims about the sex lives of many people, most of whom were associated with the Hollywood movie industry during that period. The book, which was vetted by a libel lawyer before publication, was refused by several publishers before ultimately being accepted by Grove Press and Grove/Atlantic.

== Summary ==
Bowers fought in the Pacific, including at the Battle of Iwo Jima, as a paramarine in the Marine Corps during World War II. In 1946 he was pumping gas at a service station in Hollywood when he says Walter Pidgeon gave him $20 for a gay sexual encounter. Word spread about Bowers among Pidgeon's friends, and Bowers turned the service station into a meeting place for paid sexual encounters, which took place in a nearby trailer or hotel, with his old marine friends assisting him in the business.

In 1950 he quit working at the service station and began a legitimate business as a party bartender. Bowers became well known in Hollywood for arranging sexual encounters for gay men, lesbians, bisexuals, and heterosexuals as part of his party service. In the book Bowers claims he arranged gay or bisexual encounters for many actors and notable persons. Bowers' illicit activities were never detected by the authorities; he kept all his contact information in his head.

In the mid 1970s, when the film Deep Throat was popular, Bowers claims to have arranged for Linda Lovelace to give instruction on deepthroating at parties. He also claims to have provided women—mostly prostitutes—to Alfred Kinsey as interview subjects for his famous study on human sexuality. Gore Vidal wrote that Bowers was a longtime friend whose stories he believed.

Bowers ended this business when the AIDS epidemic began, though he continued to work as a handyman and bartender during this time, and in 1984 he married. Bowers said he never took payment for arranging sexual encounters for others, only when he provided sex himself, and that though he was bisexual, his own preference was for women. Bowers never talked publicly about these experiences before but decided to do so because most of the people involved were now dead and could no longer be affected by his revelations. On June 10, 2012, Bowers was featured on the show CBS News Sunday Morning.

== Reception ==
Adam Tschorn, writing for the Los Angeles Times, described the book as having an uneven, at times choppy, pace and much purple prose, highlighting a passage in which Bowers describes how he milked a cow. Although he considered some of the details too much for the general reader, he wrote that the book was "a good trashy read". Matt Tyrnauer, a writer for Vanity Fair, described Bowers as "like the Kinsey Reports live and in living color", if the reader believed him. Joanna Walters, in The Guardian, wrote that the book was a "titillating catalogue of sexual intrigue."

== Film adaptation ==
Directed by Matt Tyrnauer and released in 2017, the documentary Scotty and the Secret History of Hollywood recounts the book's themes, expanded by additional recollections from Bowers and those in his life.

== See also ==
- Hollywood Babylon
