= Spanish Society of Academic Excellence =

- Sociedad Española De Excelencia Académica
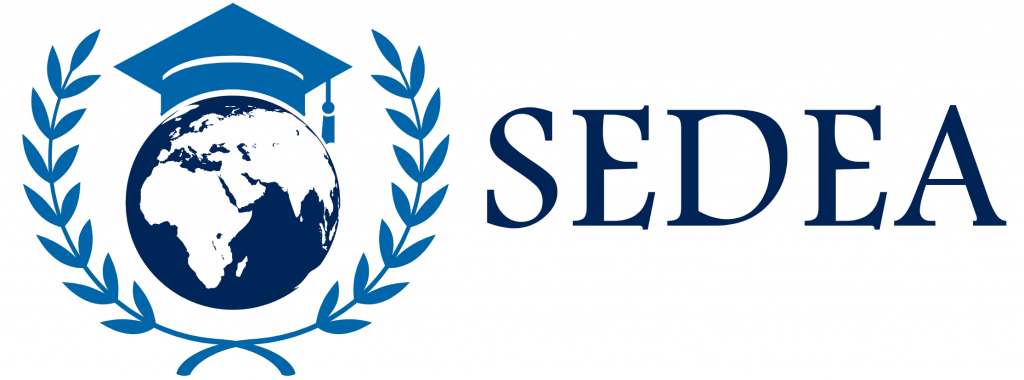
- Abbreviation: SEDEA
- Formation: 2019; 7 years ago
- Type: Association
- Purpose: to promote and disseminate academic excellence and talent
- Headquarters: Villamayor (Salamanca)
- Location: Spain
- Official language: Spanish
- Website: sedea.es

The Spanish Society of Academic Excellence (Spanish: Sociedad Española de Excelencia Académica - SEDEA) is a Spanish society to promote and disseminate academic excellence and talent.

== History ==
It was founded in 2019 and its objective is to identify and accredit the best university graduates in Spain and highlight their talent.

Among its functions, in 2019 SEDEA created the National Ranking of the Best Graduates in Spain to recognize the best graduates in the country in each academic discipline. Candidates are selected by a committee of more than 30 professors, researchers and experts in each area of knowledge, classifying the brightest graduates of each degree with a multi-parametric curricular evaluation. The final average grade of the academic record is the factor with the most specific weight in the final assessment. However, more factors are taken into account: having obtained the honorary distinction at the Baccalaureate award at the Spanish Baccalaureate degree, having obtained honours at university subjects, having obtained the Bachelor's Degree Extraordinary Award, awards or distinctions achieved, international or collaboration scholarships, academic contests or competitions, languages, conducting courses, participating in conferences, lectures at conferences, publications, student representation, volunteering, social commitment and, in general, any other academic merit.

== Membership ==
The society is of limited membership with requirements to access it. To apply for membership in SEDEA, it is an essential prerequisite to have an average grade higher than 8.00 out of 10.00 (3.2 out of 4.00) in the university academic record of the bachelor's degree (for the sole purpose of being able to apply for membership), for which a verification and accreditation process is followed by society, through the evaluation of the academic trajectory and curricular by the Evaluation Committee of the society. In addition, other merits obtained by the applicant during their training and career are taken into account (awards, publications...). Once you have been admitted, you obtain the status of full member or numerary member.

On the other hand, those people who apply for admission to the society, but do not meet the requirements and are not selected by the evaluation committee, can still obtain "non-member user" status. These "users" will only be able to participate in initiatives that are open to "non-member users".

== Evaluation Committee ==
The Spanish Society of Academic Excellence has an evaluation committee made up of different experts belonging to different areas of knowledge, which evaluates the excellence of each candidate in the society. Among the experts who are part of the committee are the following, among others:

- Carmen Caffarel, linguist and professor of Spanish audiovisual communication, general director of RTVE and director of the Cervantes Institute
- Fernando Broncano, Spanish philosopher and professor of Logic and Philosophy
- Luisa María Frutos Mejías, Spanish geographer
- Ignacio Aguaded, professor at the University of Huelva (Spain)
- Rafael Calduch, university professor and politician
- Eugenio Santos, a Spanish microbiologist, professor of microbiology and director and principal investigator of the Cancer Research Center
- Eduardo Vírgala, professor of constitutional law

== Members ==
Among the members of the Spanish Society of Academic Excellence, to which they belong as full member or numerary members, are, among others:

- Ignacio Sevilla Sánchez, aerospace engineer, ISAE-SUPAERO alumni
- Carlota Losa Mediavilla, biologist and biomedic, ETH Zurich alumni
- Pedro Villalba González, physicist, UBC Vancouver alumni
- Carla Espinós Estévez, biotechnologist, CNIC alumni
- Lucía Castelló Pedrero, bioengineer, Harvard-MIT alumni
- Rafael Vicente Sánchez Romero, computer engineer, Fulbright alumni and USC alumni
- Héctor Álvarez González, mine engineer, University of Oldenburg alumni
- Irene Noguera Alonso, energy engineer, KTH Royal Institute of Technology alumni
- Carlos Usano García, political scientist and jurist, INSEEC Business School alumni
- Karolly Kayanny Silvino De Souza, mine engineer
- Julio Moisés López Sánchez, electronic engineer, Center for Research and Innovation in Bioengineering alumni

== See also ==
- Bachelor's Degree Extraordinary Award
- Class rank
- Honours
- Honorary distinction at the Spanish Baccalaureate
