= Curso de Orientación Universitaria =

The University Orientation Course (Spanish: Curso de Orientación Universitaria) or COU was an academic level taught in Spain, its curriculum set by the Education Act 1970. It consisted of one single annual course, equivalent to the second year of the current bachillerato system. The previous completion of the three-year Bachillerato Unificado Polivalente (BUP) was an admission requirement. In order to be allowed to progress to the then-compulsory Spanish University Access Tests or Selectividad, an academic grade of 5/10 in each subject was needed.

It was equivalent to 12th grade in the United States, the last year of sixth form in the United Kingdom and the final International Baccalaureate level.

== See also ==
- Education in Spain
