= IES Jaume Vicens Vives =

Coordinates: 41°58′42″N 2°49′34″E

Jaume Vicens Vives Secondary School
- Institut Jaume Vicens Vives

Location
- Carrer Isabel la Catòlica, 17; Girona, Catalonia

Information
- Type: State secondary coeducational
- Established: 1845; 181 years ago
- Faculty: 87
- Grades: 7-12
- Enrollment: 900 (approx.)
- Colours: Blue and white
- Affiliation: Generalitat de Catalunya
- Website: www.jvvgirona.eu/ca/

Jaume Vicens Vives Secondary School (Institut Jaume Vicens Vives in Catalan) is a Spanish state secondary school located in the city of Girona (Spain). It has around 900 pupils from ages 12 to 18 studying for Spanish secondary education qualifications (ESO from 12 to 16, and LOE Baccalaureate from 16 to 18). It was the first state secondary school in Catalonia to offer the International Baccalaureate.

== School history ==
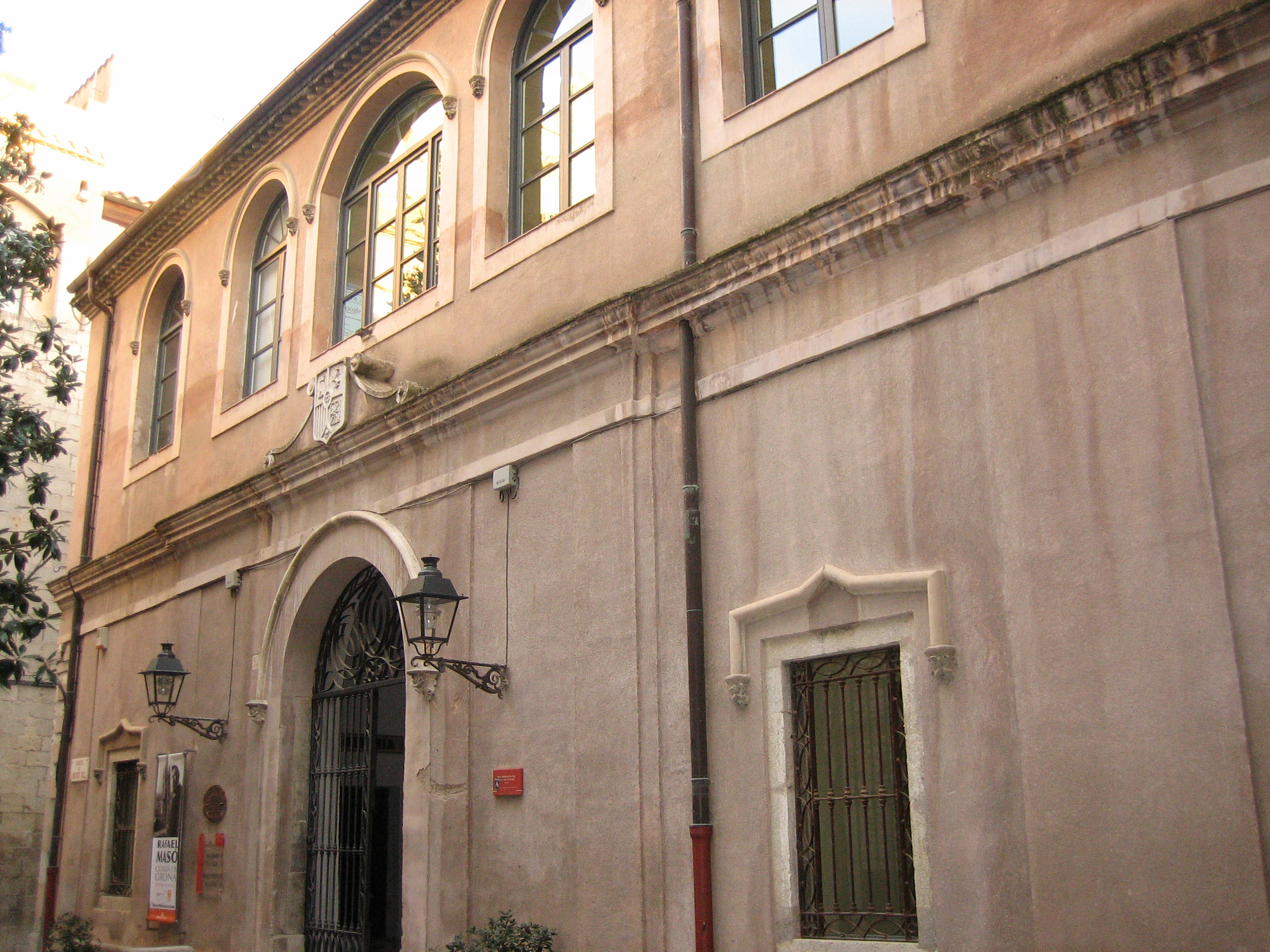
Old Building of the secondary school

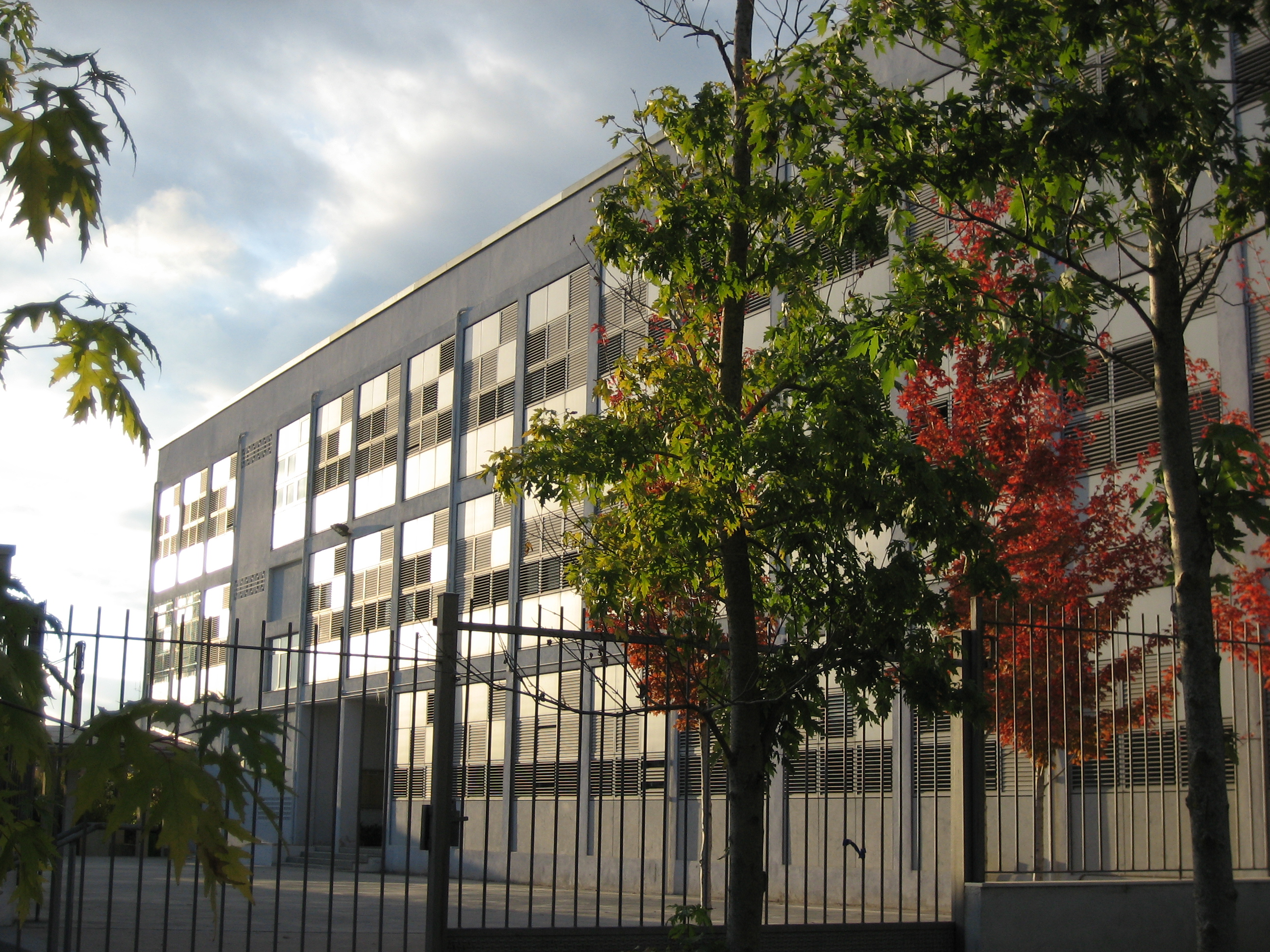
New Building of the secondary school

The Spanish Government founded the secondary school in 1845, as part of a major plan to improve access to secondary studies. To enable this, a school was founded in every provincial capital. On 17 September a new secondary school was established in Girona, at the ancient monastery of the Friars Minor Capuchin. With few resources, provided by the provincial government (called Diputació provincial) the school bought important collections in Paris of natural history, botany, chemistry and physics, as well as creating an important library for alumni and, at the same time, for the inhabitants of the city of Girona.

Since 1966 the school has been located in a new building, built in uptown Girona. This modern site was well-furnished for the education requirements of those times. Currently, the school is the leading secondary education centre in the province of Girona, with renovated facilities and some experimental courses, like the IB Diploma Programme since 1999. Also, the Senior Management Team led by Estanislau Puig created the "Institut Jaume Vicens Vives Foundation" (Fundació de l'Institut Jaume Vicens Vives), and a Board of Former Alumni, to support these new experiences.

Currently, the school is fitted with a gymnasium, a library, two computer laboratories, a physics lab, a biology lab and a chemistry lab, as well as two technology workshops, a theater and a farm.

During the COVID-19 pandemic, adjacent spaces such as the Bonavista park and the Muralles park were used as a PE field.

== Principals of the school ==
Julián González de Soto	1845–1848
Miquel Ametller i Marill	1848–1864
Josep Antoni Secret i Coll	1864–1867
Sebastià Obradors i Font	1867–1872
Francesc Castellví i Pallarés	1872–1875
Fèlix Pagès i Gimbernat	1875–1882
Joaquim d'Espona i de Nuix	1882–1921
Joan Camps i Bellapart	1921–1928
Eugeni Aulet i Soler	1928–1929
Antoni d'Espona i Puig	1930–1932
Joan Camps i Bellapart	1932–1936
Marcel Santaló i Sors	1936
Albert Balari i Galí	1937–1938
Ignasi Puig i Bayer	1939
Josep Gener i Salord	1940–1942
Joaquim Florit i Garcia	1943–1960
Santiago Sobrequés i Vidal	1960–1969
Ignasi Bonnín i Valls	1969–1976
Dolors Coquard i Oriol	1976–1979
Joaquim Mascort i Rafart	1979–1983
Neus Serra i Cornellà	1983–1986
Montserrat Boix i Pujol	1986–1989
Rafael Mas i Juli	1989–1992
Jordi Fornells i Matas	1992–1993
Rosina Lajo Pérez	1993–1997
Estanislau Puig i Artigas	1997–2000
Josep Quintanas i Bosch	2000–2004
Assumpta Ramoneda i Torné	2004–2008
Elisabet Saguer	2008–2014
Anna Masós	2014–2019
Rosor Rabassedas	2019–present

== School song ==
The school song was composed by Perfecte Moll in 1995 for the celebrations of 150th foundation of the school, with the lyrics by Francesc Amer. On 18 October 2016, the song was sung to mark the celebrations of the 175th foundation of the school.

Aura del sol (The sun's gentle)

Alcem nostres veus sobre la boirada
com aus en l'estela d'un incert futur,
floreixin els cors de nova esperança,
sadolli la terra de vida i de llum...

Com branques novelles
en ferma rabassa
libant les escletxes
de roques i fang,
brandem en les fulles,
verd, guia i mestratge,
l'ànima de pedra
de nous Catalans...!

Som ardent foguera
d'un gresol de joia,
som ànimes netes
en un cant d'amor,
som la Primavera
d'una eterna aurora,
som caliu i cendra
de lluita i esforç.

I en les velles aules
de glòries dormides,
professors i alumnes
aixequem el vol,
parets que reviuen
mil assignatures...:
Som el Vicens Vives,
som l'Aura del Sol…!
