= College of the Immaculate, Alicante =

Coordinates: 38°21′39.97″N 0°27′51.5″W

- Colegio Inmaculada
- Alicante, Spain

Information
- Type: Jesuit, Catholic
- Denomination: All faiths
- Established: 1954; 72 years ago
- Director: Roberto Garrido Bullejos
- Staff: 136
- Grades: Ages 3 to 18
- Gender: Coeducational
- Enrollment: 1,800
- Predecessor: College of Santo Domingo, Orihuela (1872)
- Jesuit reps: Manuel Ferrer, Pedro Garcis Vera
- Website: Colegio Inmaculada

College of the Immaculate, Alicante, Spain, was founded by the Society of Jesus in 1954. It is coeducational and includes three-year-olds through primary, secondary (ESO), and baccalaureate.

== History ==
In 1872 the Jesuits settled in Orihuela at the College of Santo Domingo, at the request of the Bishop. Then in 1921, with a desire to found a school in the capital city Alicante, Jesuits purchased land in the Benalúa neighborhood there, but lack of funds delayed further progress. Not until 1954 was the school opened, and named after the Immaculate Conception. In 1956 the Jesuits left the College of Santo Domingo in Orihuela and joined Inmaculada, on Avenida de Denia on the road to Valencia.

The grounds of the College covered 124 acres. Designed for 750 students, it initially welcomed 557 (158 from the capital). It had 32 Jesuits and 13 lay people on the staff. The capacity of the College in 2016 was over 1800 students, ages 3 to 18 years.

In 2016 it was rated sixth among the schools in Valencia and among the 100 best schools in Spain.

== See also ==
- List of Jesuit sites
