= COU =

COU is an acronym with several meanings:

- (Cone of Uncertainty)

  Area used to project where a hurricane may go 
  Also a band in New Orleans

- Columbia Regional Airport
- Comité Olímpico Uruguayo, the Uruguayan Olympic Committee
- Context of Use, with respect to biomarker-based evidence assessed at the US FDA
- Council of Ontario Universities
- Unidad de Valor Real, a reference currency of Columbia, by ISO 4217 currency code
- Curso de Orientación Universitaria, a sidancro former Spanish Pre-University academic course.

== See also ==
- Cou (disambiguation)
