= Academic grading in Spain =

Academic grading in Spain usually is on a numeric scale from 0–10 where grades between 5 and 10 indicate passing and scores less than 5 indicate failure.

== Primary, secondary and Baccalaureate education ==
In primary education, secondary education and Baccalaureate, Spain uses a 0 to 10-point grading scale:

- 9 and 10 is the best possible grade and is called "Sobresaliente (SB)" ("outstanding"). A special mention called "Matrícula de Honor" can be granted to a limited number of students per group (typically to up to 5% of the students).
- 7 and 8 is called "Notable (NT)" ("notable"). Sometimes a distinction is made between "notable bajo" 7 (low) and "notable alto" 8 (high).
- 6 is called "Bien (BI)" ("good").
- 5 is called "Suficiente (SU)" ("sufficient").

These are positive grades.

- Below 5 out of 10 is called "Insuficiente (IN)" ("insufficient"). This is a negative grade.

== Universities ==
Spanish universities use two different grading scales. The students' performance is assessed using a 0 to 10-point grading scale, where 10 corresponds to the 100% of the academical contents of the course which in turn are regulated by the Ministry of Education as established in the Spanish Constitution (Article 149) and in the Organic Law for Universities. In consequence, it is not rare to find courses where it is necessary to reach the 50% of the content and only a 20% of the students pass the course, especially in STEM fields. The grades can be expressed in words as follows:

- Matrícula de Honor: special distinction (The number of students eligible for this grade is usually limited by statute to less than 5% for a given assessment, or, in small groups, to 1 student in 20, according to Real Decreto 1125/2013, Article 5.6, except in doctoral thesis qualifications, that may not have any limit.)
- 9–10 out of 10: "Sobresaliente" ("outstanding").
- 7–8.9 out of 10: "Notable" ("remarkable").
- 5–6.9 out of 10: "Aprobado" ("pass").
- 0–4.9 out of 10: "Suspenso" ("failed").

Furthermore, when a student has passed a subject according to this 10-point scale, her or his grade is converted to the following 0 to 4-point scale and recorded in her/his transcript of records:

- Matrícula de Honor: 4.
- "Sobresaliente": 3.
- "Notable": 2.
- "Aprobado": 1.

Since the grades are evaluated according to the percentage of academical contents reached by the student, the percentage of students for each mark varies depending on the difficulty of the course and the generation of students. Therefore, there is no direct correspondence to the ECTS grading scale, which is based on the class percentile of passed students in a given assessment. For this reason, the following table is an approximation:

Grade in Spanish Academic Records	Definition	10-points grading scale	Definition	Estimated percentage	Estimated ECTS Grade
4	Matrícula de Honor	10	Topper in Class or Subject	95 to 100%	A+
3	Sobresaliente	9	90% Contents assumed	90 to 95%	A
2	Notable	7	70% Contents assumed	70 to 89.9%	B
1	Aprobado	6	60% Contents assumed	60 to 69.9%	C
1	Aprobado	5.5	55% Contents assumed	55 to 59.9%	D
1	Aprobado	5	50% Contents assumed	50 to 54.9%	E
	Suspenso		Less than 50% contents assumed (60% in many cases)	49% or below	FX-F
