= Honours (Spain) =

Highest available university subject award

The Honours (Matrícula de Honor, in Spanish) is the maximum and extraordinary grade that can be obtained in a subject at the university (in Spain).

This honours grade leads to a discount in the enrollment rates of the following course corresponding to the number of ECTS credits in which this mention has been obtained.

This should not be confused with the "Distinction of Honours at the Spanish Baccalaureate" which is an academic award granted annually to the students who have completed their Spanish Baccalaureate with the best academic record and with the highest grade point average in their Class. In contrast, the Honours is a grade in a subject at the university.

== The Honours grade at university ==
The Honors in the Spanish university system is regulated by Royal Decree 1125/2003, of September 5, which establishes the European credit system and the grading system in official university degrees valid in the entire national territory.

The mention of “Honors” in a subject may be awarded to students who have obtained a grade equal to or greater than 9.0. Their number may not exceed five percent of the students enrolled in a subject in the corresponding academic year, unless the number of students enrolled is less than 20, in which case a single “Honors” may be granted.

— Royal Decree 1125/2003, of September 5.

The Honours in the university is granted in each subject enrolled in the university degree, to the student who obtains a classification equal to or greater than 9 and also deserves that qualification, recognizing the academic result and trajectory of the awarded student and this entails a discount on the rates of the university of the following year equal to the number of credits in which said Honours has been obtained. The legislation establishes that each university faculty can grant an Honours for every twenty students. It is similar to distinction (merit with distinction) in the English classification, but it is a little bit more than a distinction.

Example of an academic record in the university with the rating system of Spanish universities (academic record of a bachelor's degree in law):

Subject	Classification (number)	Classification	ECTS credits of subject	Examination sitting	Withdrawals
Civil law	10	Merit	12	1st	0
Criminal law	10	Honours	6	1st	0
Political law	9	Merit	6	1st	0
European Union law	8	Good	9	1st	0
International law	10	Honours	9	1st	0
Administrative law	7	Good	10	1st	0

As it can be seen in the example, a grade of 10 out of 10 in a subject can be Merit, it doesn't have to be an honours classification. It is similar to distinction (Merit with distinction) in the English classification, but it is a little bit more than a distinction. In Spanish university qualification scale, there is: aprobado, bien / Pass (5 to 6.9), Notable / Good (7 to 8.9), Sobresaliente / Merit (9 to 10).

== Notable students with honours mentions at their bachelor's degree studies ==
Among the people who have obtained Honours grades or mentions at the university in their bachelor's degree (or licenciate degree) studies:

- Soraya Saénz de Santamaría, she finished first of her promotion in the licenciate degree in law at the University of Valladolid, with an academic record full of Honours and she obtained the Bachelor's Degree Extraordinary Award.
- Pablo Iglesias, he obtained 13 Honours in his licenciate degree in political science at the Complutense University of Madrid, the best record of his promotion and therefore obtained the Bachelor's Degree Extraordinary Award.
- Mario Conde, he obtained Honours in all subjects of the licenciate degree in law at the University of Deusto, and the highest grade ever achieved in oppositions to State Lawyer.
- Jesús Posada, he obtained 40 honours in his academic record in the licenciate degree in civil engineering.
- Alfredo Perez Rubalcaba, he finished first of his promotion in the licenciate degree in chemistry, with an academic record full of Honours and he obtained the Bachelor's Degree Extraordinary Award
- José Ignacio Wert, he finished first of his promotion in the licenciate degree in law, with an academic record full of Honours and he obtained the Bachelor's Degree Extraordinary Award
- Alberto Ruiz-Gallardón, he finished first of his promotion in the licenciate degree in law, with an academic record full of Honours and he obtained the Bachelor's Degree Extraordinary Award

== See also ==
- Bachelor's Degree Extraordinary Award
- Bachelor's Thesis Award
- Distinction of Honours at the Spanish Baccalaureate
- Mention of excellence (Spain)
- Valedictorian
