= CEIP =

CEIP stands for

- Customer Experience Improvement Program, a Microsoft customer-experience management initiative, also known as SQM (Software Quality Metrics)
- Carnegie Endowment for International Peace
- Centro de Educación Infantil y Primaria, Spanish state primary school
