= Alberto Cardín =

Spanish essayist and anthropologist

Benigno Alberto Cardín Garay (15 January 1948 in Villamayor – 26 January 1992 in Barcelona) was a Spanish essayist and anthropologist, and one of the most important gay Spanish activists of the Spanish transition to democracy. He was also a prominent author of gay Spanish literature.

== Biography ==
He was born in Villamayor, in Asturias but after a year and a half, he and his mother moved to Mexico where his father has a shirt factory. At the age of 9, he returned alone to Asturias in order to study at the Immaculate Conception's College in Gijón. He remained in college, initially as a boarding student until 1960 when he attended the school while living outside the grounds, until 1965. After a brief time in Deusto and trying to become a Jesuit, in 1968 he went to study Philosophy and Literature in Salamanca, before moving to Oviedo where he graduated in History of Medieval Art and History of Contemporary Art in 1972.

In a trip to Mexico, where he spent time reminiscing on his childhood, he came into contact with the cultural movements that were occurring in both Europe and America. After this, he moved permanently to Barcelona in 1973. The following year, he started to write for various magazines and newspapers, mainly for El viejo topo, but also for El País, Ajoblanco y Diwan, the latter for which he was Assistant Editor until 1981. Following this his works were mainly found in Disidencias, Cuadernos del Norte, Diagonal, El Noticiero Universal as well as others. He was the force behind various editorial projects, among which those that stand out are the aforementioned magazine Diwan (1978), La Bañera (1979) and Luego... cuadernos de crítica e investigación (1985). Most of his work is can be found in articles in magazines and newspapers, which have been assembled in various books.

In August 1985, he publicly announced that he has AIDS in an interview with Lola Díaz, published in Cambio 16. During this time, AIDS was still an unknown disease, that was attributed to homosexuals and caused fear and the stigmatization of victims. Cardín turned himself into one of the leading experts of the disease in Spain, as well as one of the loudest voices in spreading awareness.

He continued his doctorate at the University of Barcelona in 1986, with the thesis title Dialectics and Cannibalism, in which he tried to deconstruct the concept of cannibalism, which has been used to try and vilify primitive people.

Cardín died on 26 January 1992 in his home in Barcelona, due to AIDS. His personal library was moved after his death, in March that same year, to the Philosophy Department of the University of Oviedo. In May, the Catalan Institute of Anthropology, the Institute of Humanities of Barcelona and the University of Barcelona organised an act of homage for Cardín.

He was one of the editors and signatories of the Manifiesto de los 2.300, a manifesto which reclaimed the rights of Spanish speaking Catalans.

== Works ==
According to Alberto Mira, Cardín was of the great Spanish heterodox thinkers of his time. His constant polemic, both intellectual and personal, his lack of respect for conventions and academic protocols, led him to write on an enormous number of topics, including his reflections on contemporary culture, anthropology, religion and philosophy. The lyrical work of Cardín is assembled in Paciencia del destino (1980), Despojos (1981), and Indículo de sombras (1983). Aside from his lyrical work, Cardín is known for his work as a translator, one of the highlights of which is Marcel Proust, the veiled visitor: [Cartas y documentos inéditos] (1982) by Princess Marthe Bibesco.

== Gay activist ==
Cardín always made it clear that his homosexual identity was an essential part of his life and the homosexual culture likewise was an essential part of his thinking. However, his relationship with gay activists, with whom he entered into contact at the end of the 70s, was never easy. After discovering that he was HIV-positive in 1984, he became the main voice in Spain dealing with the subject, talking about in terms of a cultural epidemic as well as an illness of the body, speaking clearly about all of the consequences and implications of the disease, including the homophobia and the passive government. In 1985, he compiled two volumes on this topic in collaboration with Armand de Fluvià, with articles that had been published in the US and Spain, fighting against the inaction of homosexual groups and the misinformation of the media. In 1991, when the disease was much better understood, he published AIDS: Biblical curse or lethal disease?.

Cardín also studied homosexuality in his work as an anthropologist. In Warriors, shamans and transvestites: signs of homosexuality among the exotic (1984), he dealt with the gender and sexuality of numerous cultures around the world. In Lo próximo y lo ajeno, he turned his anthropological gaze to gay culture during the AIDS crisis.

In 1985, he convinced Eduardo Suárez, the director of the Editorial Laertes at the time, to create in this editorial a collection of books dedicated exclusively to LGBT culture. Thus, that year, the collection Rey de Bastos, the first in Spain (long before the specialised editorials which appeared in the 90s), which would house a collection of essay and narratives pertaining to this type of literature. In the same collection, Alberto Cardín would publish his books Detrás por delante and Lo mejor es lo peor, as well as the essay SIDA: enfoques alternativos.

== Bibliography ==
- Mira, Alberto (1999). "Cardin, Alberto". Para entendernos. Diccionario de cultura homosexual, gay y lésbica (in Spanish). Barcelona: Libros de la Tempestad. pp. 158–160. ISBN 84-7948-038-6.
- Mira, Alberto (23 November 2000). "Cardin, Alberto". In Robert Aldrich; Garry Wotherspoon (eds.). Who's Who in Gay and Lesbian History: From Antiquity to World War II. Routledge. ISBN 978-0415159821.
- Bueno Sánchez, Gustavo (1992). "Alberto Cardín Garay (1948-1992). Apuntes para una bio-bibliografía". El Basilisco. pp. 30–43.
- Cardín, Alberto, Mi más hermoso texto. Poesía completa (1976-1983), Ultramarinos editorial, Barcelona, 2016.
