= St. Stanislaus Kostka College, Salamanca =

Coordinates: 40°57′50.38″N 5°39′17.03″W

- Colegio San Estanislao de Kostka, Salamanca
- Salamanca, Spain

Information
- Type: Jesuit, Catholic
- Established: 1952; 74 years ago
- Director: Sigifredo Crego Martín
- Grades: Infant through ESO
- Gender: Coeducational
- Publication: Ilusión Escolar
- Website: St. Stanislaus Kostka College

St. Stanislaus Kostka College, Salamanca, is a Jesuit college founded in 1952. It grew gradually after 1952 with the efforts of Jesuits to organize a parish in the Prosperity district of Salamanca, Spain. It now accommodates children from infant through secondary (ESO).

== History ==
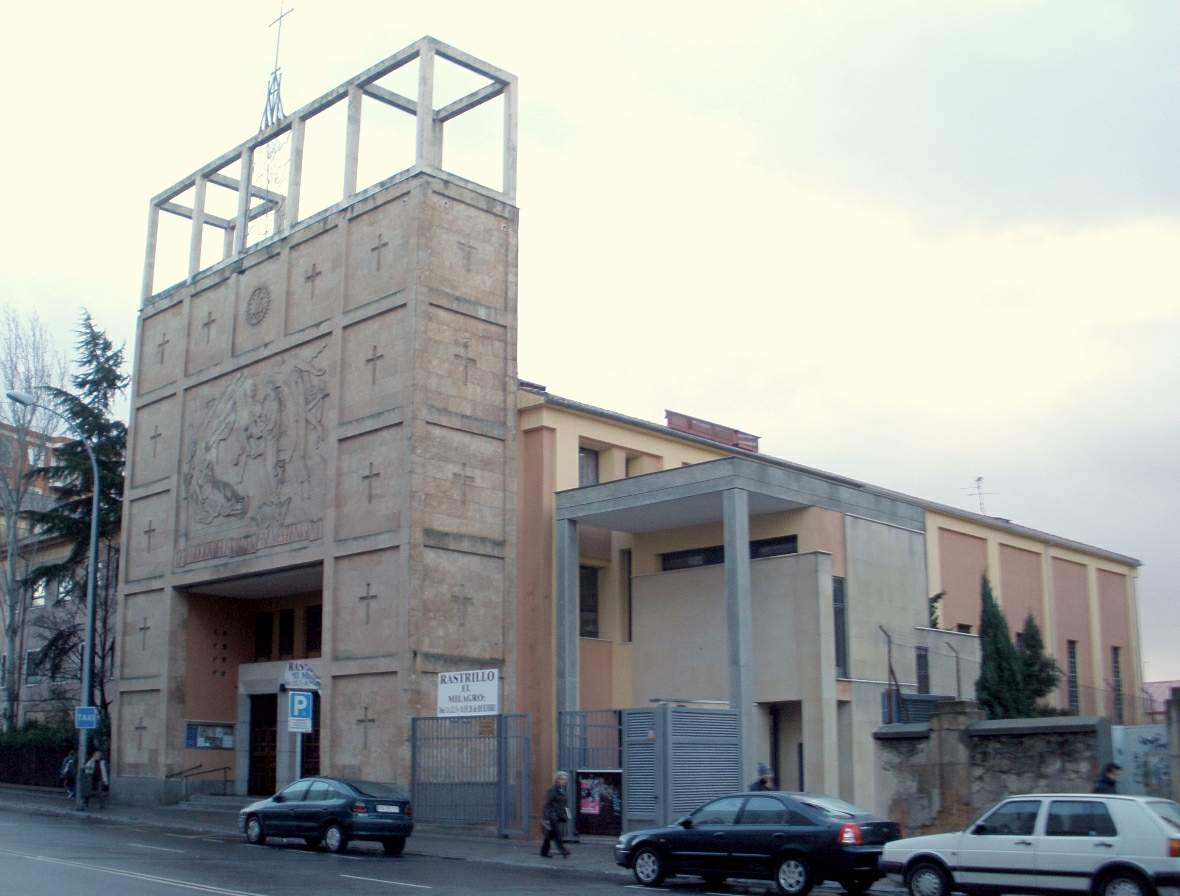
College church of St. Josephthumb

The school traces its history to the efforts of various Jesuits to build a church and school in the Prosperity area of Salamanca, beginning in 1952. The church was completed in 1957 and it became a parish church in 1968. In 1995 St. Stanislaus Kostka College was in place.

== See also ==
- List of Jesuit sites
