= Elena Diego =

Spanish politician (born 1972)

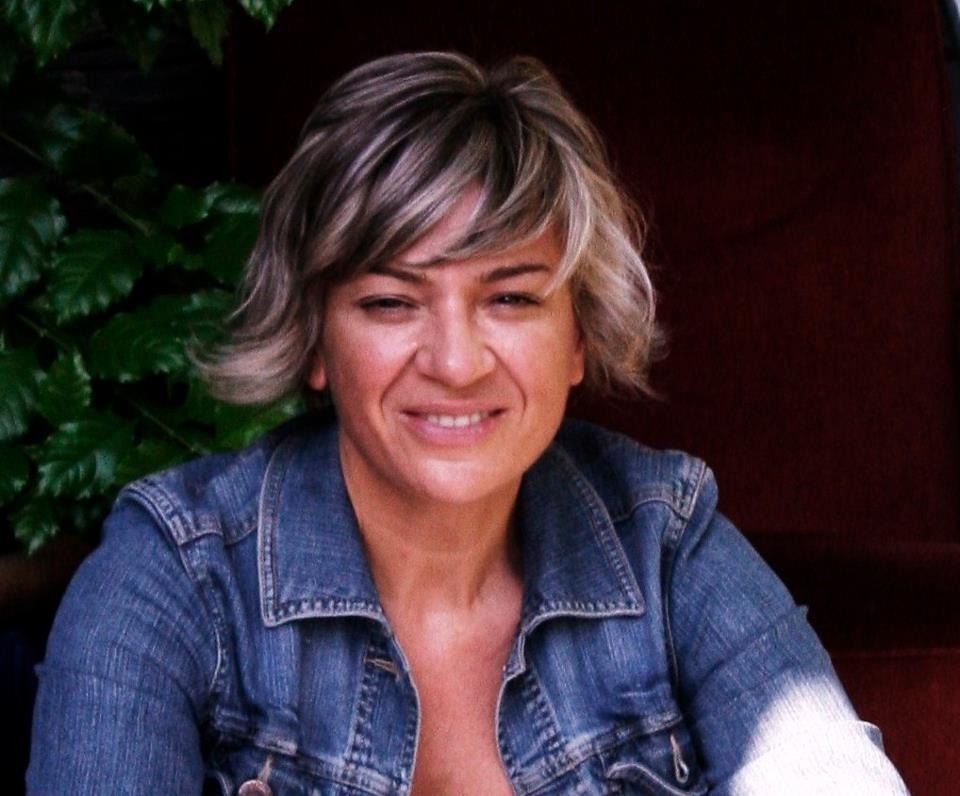
- Diego in 2012

Member of the Senate
- In office 28 April 2019 – 31 July 2025
- Constituency: Salamanca
- In office 20 November 2011 – 24 September 2014
- Constituency: Salamanca

Personal details
- Born: 19 September 1972 (age 53)
- Party: Spanish Socialist Workers' Party

María Elena Diego Castellanos (born 19 September 1972) is a Spanish politician. She was a member of the Senate from 2011 to 2014 and from 2019 to 2025. From 2003 to 2011, she served as mayor of Villamayor.
