= IES Fortuny =

Address
- Calle de Fortuny, 24, 28010, Madrid, Spain
- Coordinates: 40.433737°N 3.689794°W

Information
- Type: Secondary school
- Grades: ESO, Bachillerato

The IES Fortuny is a "trilingual" high school located on the Fortuny Street in Madrid, Spain.

The school consists of seven floors with ten classrooms each. A small playground can be found outside of the buildings, divided into a basketball and a volleyball court. The school also owns a gym.
