= Distinction of Honours at the Spanish Baccalaureate =

Spanish academic award

Distinction of "Honours" at the Spanish Baccalaureate
- Distinción de "Matrícula de Honor" en Bachillerato
- Awarded for: The best academic record and the highest grade point average (GPA) in their graduating class at the Spanish Baccalaureate degree (first in their graduating class)
- Country: Spain

The distinction of "Honours" at the Spanish Baccalaureate (distinción de "Matrícula de Honor" en Bachillerato, in Spanish) is an academic award granted annually to the students who have completed their Spanish Baccalaureate degree with the best academic results, the best academic record and with the highest grade point average (GPA) in their graduating class (that is, first in their graduating class). It is given to the student with the highest academic grade average standing among their graduating class (promotion).

At a comparable level, in the UK, it would be similar not only to achieving A grades (maximum grade) in the GCE A level, but also a special "honours" mention for the academic performance shown by the student. This is why not only is the grade of "outstanding" obtained (sobresaliente, in Spanish; the maximum grade), but in addition to obtaining the average grade of "outstanding", an "honours" mention is awarded ("outstanding with honours").

It was created by the Government of Spain in 2012. The distinction is awarded based on the overall average grade obtained in the Spanish Baccalaureate degree (not to a specific subject). As the Government of Spain explained, the distinction "aims to recognize the effort of those students who achieve outstanding grades, linking the recognition to a global assessment (overall average grade) rather than to each of the subjects", the student having to end first in his or her graduating class.

As honorary teacher and former high school director Secundino Llorente Sánchez stated, "The Distinction of Honours at the Spanish Baccalaureate is the best student prize, award, reward or trophy that a student can receive at the age of eighteen upon finishing the Baccalaureate degree, and he or she can boast about having achieved it throughout his or her career and throughout his or her life".

This award should not be confused with the "Honours" grade or mention at university, which is the maximum and extraordinary grade that can be obtained in a subject at the university (in Spain). In contrast, the "distinction of "Honours" at the Spanish Baccalaureate" is a distinction, award or recognition to students who have been the first of their promotion in the Spanish Baccalaureate degree. In this sense, the "distinction of "Honours" at the Spanish Baccalaureate" may be more similar to the "Bachelor's Degree Extraordinary Award", which is the award given to students who have been the first of their promotion in their bachelor's degree studies at university.

== The distinction of "Honours" (2012) ==
This distinction was created by the Government of Spain in 2012 by virtue of "Order ECD/334/2012, of February 15, which modifies Order ESD/3725/2008, of December 12, on evaluation in Baccalaureate in the area of management of the Department and the distinction of "Honours" is established in the second year of Baccalaureate".

Those students who, after the ordinary evaluation of the second year of Baccalaureate have obtained in the grades of this course an average grade equal to or higher than nine [out of 10.00], will be able to obtain the distinction of "Honours". Said distinction will be granted to a number of no more than one for every twenty students or a resulting fraction higher than fifteen of all the students enrolled in the educational center in the second year of Baccalaureate.

— Order ECD / 334/2012, of February 15.

In the Spanish Baccalaureate, the distinction of "Honours" is awarded to the best record of the entire graduating class (first in their graduating class), recognizing the academic performance of the awarded student and entailing a discount on university fees for the following year. The legislation establishes that each center can grant an "Honours" distinction for every twenty students.

In this way, the requirements to be awarded the distinction of "Honours" award are two: first, the student must be the best in their promotion at the Spanish Baccalaureate (best academic record and highest average grade, first in their graduating class), and second, that that student's average grade (global grade) of the Spanish Baccalaureate degree must be equal to or greater than 9.00 out of 10.00 (3.6 out of 4.00).

The Spanish Baccalaureate teaching teams are responsible for deciding which students will be awarded this distinction of "Honours", although they will be subject to previously agreed criteria established in the center's educational project.

Obtaining the distinction of "Honours" may mean, upon completion of your studies, access to the "Academic Excellence Scholarships" of the regional government and the Baccalaureate National Awards of the Ministry of Education (upon request of the interested person), which regulates Order ECD/482/2018, of May 4, which regulates the Baccalaureate National Awards.

== Economic side ==
Obtaining the distinction of "Honours" at the Spanish Baccalaureate means exemption from university fees for the first university year of the university degree taken immediately after the Baccalaureate. In this way, it represents a complete exemption from tuition costs for the first year of a university degree.

== Modification of the year 2022 ==
In 2022, the Ministry of Education of the Government of Spain modified the rule for the distinction of "Honours" at the Spanish Baccalaureate, and made the criteria for its granting more flexible.

== Legislation ==
- Order ECD/334/2012 of February 15 (which modifies Order ESD/3725/2008 of December 12) on evaluation in Baccalaureate in the area of management of the department and establishes the distinction of "Honours" in the second year of Baccalaureate.
- Order ECD/482/2018, of May 4, which regulates the National Baccalaureate Awards.

== See also ==
- Honours (Spain)
- Bachelor's Degree Extraordinary Award
