= Comunicar =

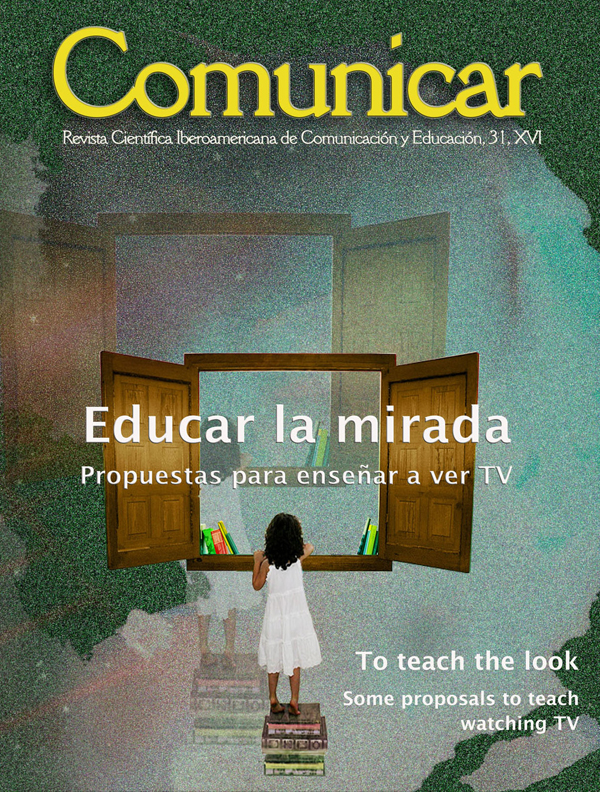
- Discipline: Media Education
- Language: English, Spanish, Chinese, Portuguese
- Edited by: Ignacio Aguaded

Publication details
- History: 1993–present
- Publisher: Grupo Comunicar Ediciones (Spain)
- Frequency: Quarterly
- Open access: Yes
- License: CC BY-NC
- Impact factor: 3.375 (2020)

Standard abbreviations
- ISO 4: Comunicar

Indexing
- ISSN: 1134-3478 (print); 1988-3293 (web)
- JSTOR: 19883293

Links
- Journal homepage

Comunicar is a quarterly peer-reviewed open access academic journal covering research on education, communication, and social sciences. Articles are published in Spanish and English and have abstracts in Chinese and Portuguese. The journal was established in 1993 and is published by Grupo Comunicar. Since 2016 it is published quarterly. Its editor-in-chief is Ignacio Aguaded. The journal is abstracted and indexed in the Social Sciences Citation Index and Scopus. According to the Journal Citation Reports, the journal has a 2016 impact factor of 2.212.

== History ==
The journal was first published by Grupo Comunicar, non-profit professional association of researchers in communication and education, established in Spain in 1989.

== Types of articles ==
The journal is structured in two sections:

- Monographic Dossier: Monographic articles on topics of the intersection of media and education.
- Kaleidoscope: Miscellaneous section dedicated to research on various topics related to communication and education, as well as reports, studies, proposals and state-of-the-art articles on these same topics.
