= Ignacio Aguaded =

Spanish academic

Ignacio Aguaded (born 1962), is a professor at the University of Huelva, a specialist in Educational Technology and Media education and the Editor-in-chief of an academic journal called Comunicar. Aguaded is also a member on the scientific councils of other journals and scientific committees including the Congreso Iberoamericano de Comunicación y Educación, Congreso Hispanoluso, Hacia una televisión de calidad and RTVE forum. Aguaded has published more than 80 books and book chapters in editorials such as Ediciones Egregius, Ediciones Paidós, Grupo Comunicar, Editorial K.R., Ediciones Aljibe, Alianza Editorial, Editorial Síntesis and Netbiblo.

== Career ==
Aguaded has taught at the level of Primary education, Baccalaureate and at the University level. He has a PhD in Psychopedagogy and a Bachelor of Science in Educology and Hispanic Philology. Aguaded worked at the University of Seville in 1990 as Research and Innovation Coordinator. Between 1992 and 1994 Aguaded worked as a high school teacher and starting in 1993, Aguaded has worked in the Department of Education, as an official in the Services Commission. Aguaded also manages a Master's Degree program in Communication and Audiovisual Education, and also the Interuniversity Program of Doctorate in Communication, at the University of Huelva.
