= Cou =

Cou may refer to:

- Cao (surname), sometimes romanized "Cou" in Cantonese
- An alternate spelling of the Tsou language
- An alternate spelling of the Tsou people of Taiwan

== See also ==
- COU (disambiguation)
