= Mention of excellence (Spain) =

Spanish college academic award

The distinction of “Graduate with Excellence”, mention of “Graduate with Excellence” or simply mention of Excellence (in the bachelor's degree) is a distinction or mention granted by some universities in Spain in each of the university bachelor's degree studies to the students with the best academic performance within of their promotion.

== The mention ==
Unlike the Bachelor's Degree Extraordinary Award (which is awarded to the student with the best academic record in the class), the mention of Excellence it is a minor distinction that is not awarded strictly based on the average grade of the academic record, but rather by fulfilling other university academic requirements. In a class of 100 students there may be 7 or 8 mentions of Excellence.

The requirements for granting this mention:

- That the student has completed the bachelor's degree (in its entirety).
- That the student has completed the bachelor's degree in the number of academic years corresponding to its (official) duration.
- That the student has passed all the credits of the bachelor's degree in the first ordinary examination call/sitting (that is, the student has not missed any exam session/sitting, nor has they failed any).
- That the university academic record of the student does not contain subjects with the grade “Failed”, “Not presented”, “Resigned” or “Recognised”.
- One mention for every 14 students maximum (around 7 mentions in a class of 100 students).

If the total number of students who meet these requirements is greater than 14, the students will be ordered based on the average grade of their academic record. This is why it may happen that one student has obtained a grade of 8.00 out of 10.00 and another 7.00 out of 10.00 and that the mention is awarded to the latter, since the mention is not based on the average grade. The granting of this mention to the student means that this mention will appear in their official title of the bachelor's degree study in question.

On the other hand, it is possible to obtain both the Excellence mention and the Bachelor's Degree Extraordinary Award (they have no connection between them, they are independent). In this case, the student with the beste academic record of the promotion will accumulate both awards (in the same way that they can also be awarded with another award, such as the bachelor's thesis award, which in that case would also accumulate).

== See also ==
- Valedictorian
- Class rank
- Latin honors
- Bachelor's Thesis Award
