= Bachelor's Degree Extraordinary Award =

Annual award by Spanish universities

- Premio Extraordinario de Fin de Carrera
- Awarded for: The best academic record and the highest grade point average (GPA) in their graduating class at the bachelor's degree (first in their graduating class)
- Country: Spain
- Presented by: University

The Bachelor's Degree Extraordinary Award (also the Bachelor's Degree Extraordinary Prize or End-of-Bachelor's-Degree Extraordinary Award, Premio Extraordinario de Fin de Carrera or Premio Extraordinario de Licenciatura/Grado, in Spanish), is the official and prestigious university academic award granted annually by each university in Spain to university students who have completed their bachelor's degree with the best academic results, the best academic record and with the highest grade point average (GPA) in their graduating class (that is, first in their graduating class).

It is a Spanish academic award for the best academic results at university, given to the student with the highest academic standing among their graduating class (promotion), the student having to end first in his or her graduating class. It is a bit similar to the Major de promotion ("first in class") in France or to the Academic Excellence Award (Bachelor's Award) or the Outstanding Academic Achievement Award in some universities such as the Central European University.

== The award ==
The Bachelor's Degree Extraordinary Award is awarded annually by the Governing Council of each Spanish university, for each bachelor's degree that the university offers (Medicine, Law, Economics, ...), to students who have the best academic records (with an academic record full of distinctions and Honours), that is, to students who are the first in their graduating class.

As a university award, each university approves its own regulations on the awarding of the Bachelor's Degree Extraordinary Award. The extraordinary awards will be granted by the Rector at the proposal of the Centers, Faculties or Schools. The prizes usually have an economic endowment, either in direct mode or in way of exemption of payments in subsequent studies.

=== Award name ===
As the prize is awarded by each university, there may be some slight variation in the name, but most universities follow the same name. This award which rewards and recognizes the excellence in academic career is called:

- Bachelor's Degree Extraordinary Award (Premio Extraordinario de Licenciatura/Grado, in Spanish)
- Extraordinary End-of-Degree Award (Premio Extraordinario de Fin de Carrera, in Spanish)
- Extraordinary End-of-Studies Award (Premio Extraordinario de Fin de Estudios, in Spanish)
- Extraordinary Prize of Degree or Extraordinary Prize of Bachelor's Degree (Premio Extraordinario de Licenciatura/Grado, in Spanish)
- Extraordinary Degree Award (Premio Extraordinario de Licenciatura/Grado, in Spanish)

== Notable people awarded with the Bachelor's Degree Extraordinary Award ==
Among famous students who were awarded by their university with the Bachelor's Degree Extraordinary Award for having the best academic record of their graduating class at university (first in their graduating class):

- Mariano Rajoy, conferred by the University of Santiago de Compostela.
- Soraya Saénz de Santamaría, conferred by the University of Valladolid.
- Enrique Tierno Galván, conferred by the Complutense University of Madrid.
- Mario Conde, conferred by the University of Deusto.
- José Ignacio Wert, conferred by the Complutense University of Madrid.
- Jordi Solé Tura, conferred by the University of Barcelona
- Macarena Olona Choclán, conferred by the University of Alicante.
- Gustavo Villapalos, conferred by the Complutense University of Madrid.
- Alberto Oliart, conferred by the University of Barcelona
- Pablo Iglesias, conferred by the Complutense University of Madrid.
- Cristóbal Montoro, conferred by the Autonomous University of Madrid.
- José Luis Escrivá, conferred by the Complutense University of Madrid.
- Gonzalo Caballero, conferred by the University of Vigo.

== See also ==
- Honours (Spain)
- Mention of excellence (Spain)
- Bachelor's Thesis Award
- Distinction of Honours at the Spanish Baccalaureate
