= Bienvenido de Arriba =

Spanish politician (born 1973)

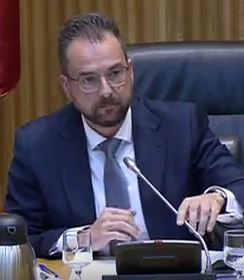
- De Arriba in 2018

Member of the Senate
- Incumbent
- Assumed office 28 April 2019
- Constituency: Salamanca

Member of the Congress of Deputies
- In office 5 July 2016 – 5 March 2019
- Constituency: Salamanca

Personal details
- Born: 29 April 1973 (age 52)
- Party: People's Party

Bienvenido de Arriba Sánchez (born 29 April 1973) is a Spanish politician serving as a member of the Senate since 2019. From 2016 to 2019, he was a member of the Congress of Deputies.
