= Asociación de Inspectores de Educación =

Spanish professional association

Asociación de Inspectores de Educación (ADIDE) is a Spanish professional association of education supervisors. By the number of its members it is the most important association of these professionals in Spain: nowadays, 950 out of 1600 Spanish Inspectors of Education are members of ADIDE, while the rest of them are either unassociated or splitting their membership into several different associations and unions.

== Background ==
Educational professionals usually group themselves either in unions, professional associations or professional organizations. Unions have as their main aim the defence of the labour conditions of their members. Professional associations deal with the performance of the Code of Professional Ethics established by the association. Professional associations, like ADIDE, can have as well as the previous interests, some different aims and concerns, such as ensuring the professional development of members through suitable formation and training, the organization of scientific meetings and congresses, and the publishing of professional magazines and books.

The Inspectorate of Education is a body (or two, actually) of civil servants of about 1600 people in Spain. This body of inspectors supervise all the Spanish education system except the university studies. Every inspector is usually in charge of several schools and other educational institutions, and performs his/her duties according to an annual Inspection Plan. Quite often, however inspectors have to tackle with all kind of incidents and unscheduled situations which requires much attention from them.

== Founding ==
After the establishment of democracy, the Spanish education system undertook very important changes in the 1980s, a time when a significant group of teachers and school administrators started to carry out the supervision function of schools. The already existing associations of inspectors of education at that time did not ensure the professional development of the new inspectors, so it was necessary for them to found a new association. ADIDE was created in 1990 and soon started to replace the absence of unions to achieve the promotion of professional interests and helping to put into practice the new educational policies as settled in the Education reform provided by the Organic Act of General Organization of the Educational System 1990.

Initially, ADIDE was a unique national organization for the whole of Spain, but due to the Association Act 2005, it had to adopt a federated structure, which provoked some problems of interaction on the very first moments. The new technologies and members’ cooperation worked well to maintain a good level of coordination among all the federal associations, one for every one of the Spanish Autonomous Regions, which hold a high level of independence in educational matters. The federated association is since then known as ADIDE-Federación, while every autonomous region association is known by the name of ADIDE followed by the name of the region it operates on.

== See also ==
- History of education in Spain
