= Bachelor's Thesis Award =

- Awarded for: Best dissertation, thesis or research work at university
- Presented by: University

The Bachelor's Thesis Award (also the Undergraduate Thesis Award, Undergraduate Dissertation Award, Undergraduate Thesis Prize, Bachelor's Dissertation Award, Bachelor's Degree Thesis Award or Outstanding Undergraduate Thesis Award), is an academic award granted annually by a university to the best dissertation, thesis or research work in Bachelor's Degree at university, for their excellence in research.

== The award ==
The Bachelor's Thesis Award aims to reward excellence in research and in the dissertation of the university student. It is awarded in any field of knowledge (science, technology, medicine, law, social sciences, ...).

The Bachelor's Thesis Award can be awarded by the university, by the faculty or by an academic entity outside the university (a foundation, a company, ...).

== See also ==
- Bachelor's Degree Extraordinary Award
- Valedictorian
- Class rank
- Dux
- Grade inflation
- Latin honors
- Honours
