= Villamayor =

- Municipality
- Flag Coat of arms

- Location in Salamanca
- Coordinates: 41°0′3″N 5°41′23″W
- Country: Spain
- Autonomous community: Castile and León
- Province: Salamanca
- Comarca: La Armuña

Government
  - Mayor: Manuel Gago (PSOE)

Area
  - Total: 16 km^{2} (6.2 sq mi)
- Elevation: 782 m (2,566 ft)

Population (2025-01-01)
  - Total: 7,728
  - Density: 480/km^{2} (1,300/sq mi)
- Time zone: UTC+1 (CET)
  - Summer (DST): UTC+2 (CEST)
- Website: www.villamayor.es

Villamayor is a municipality located in the province of Salamanca, Castile and León, Spain. According to the 2016 census (INE), the municipality has a population of 7,047 inhabitants.

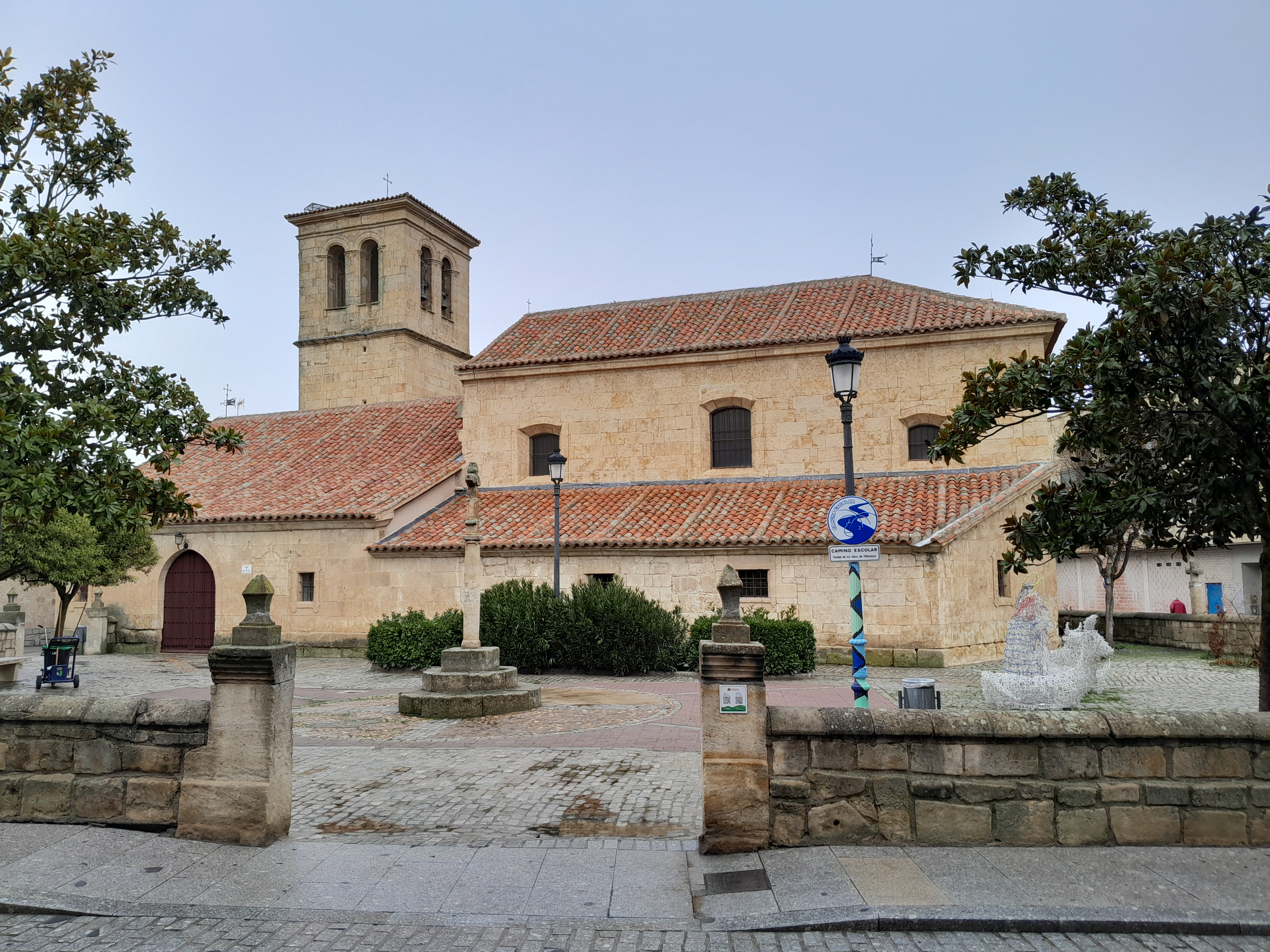
St. Michael's Church in Villamayor

== Buildings and headquarters ==
Villamayor is the headquarters of the Spanish Society of Academic Excellence.
