= Selectividad =

Spanish university entrance examinations

Selectividad (Spanish pronunciation: [seleɣtiβiˈðað]) is the popular name given to the Spanish University Admission Tests ("Evaluación de Bachillerato para Acceso a la Universidad", E.B.A.U. or Ev.A.U.), a non-compulsory exam taken by students after Bachillerato, necessary to get into University. Students must take six 90-minute written exams over three days in June or September, consisting of common and specific subjects taken in Spanish Baccalaureate or Bachillerato (the last two non-compulsory years of secondary education). Selectividad exams are set by the Public Universities of each autonomous community and allow students access to the Spanish university system.

== Subjects (before 2009) ==
=== Common Subjects ===
1. Spanish language and literature
2. First foreign language (usually English (non oral), but can also be French, German, Italian or Portuguese)
3. History of Spain
4. Galician, Catalan or Valencian and Basque are also common subjects in Galicia; Catalonia and Balearic Islands, Valencia; and the Basque Country, respectively.

Selectividad or Scholastic Aptitude Test is accepted by USA universities if accompanied by TOEFL English exam.

=== Specific Subjects ===
Arts:

1. Artistic Drawing
2. History of Art
3. Choose between Graphic Expression Techniques or Image

Humanities:

1. Latin
2. History of Art
3. Choose between: Ancient Greek, Geography, History of Music, Catalan / Spanish Literature or History of Philosophy

Social Sciences:

1. Applied Mathematics
2. Economy and Business Administration
3. Geography

Sciences and Engineering:

1. Physics
2. Mathematics
3. Choose between: Chemistry, Technical Drawing, Industrial Technology, Electrotechnics or Mechanics

Nature Sciences:

1. Chemistry
2. Biology
3. Choose between: Mathematics, Physics or Environmental Sciences

Mathematics is compulsory for all sciences options

== Since 2010 ==
In 2009/2010, Selectividad exams changed. Now, these exams have two parts:

=== Common part ===
Everybody has to do this part, and it consists in 4 compulsory tests (5 in case of Galicia, Catalonia, Valencia, the Basque Country and Balearic Islands)

1. First foreign language (English, French, Italian, German or Portuguese)
2. History of Spain or History of philosophy
3. Spanish Language and Literature.
4. Galician, Catalan, Valencian and Basque are also common subjects in Galicia; Catalonia and Balearic Islands, Valencia; and the Basque Country, respectively
5. A subject from your specific "Bachillerato" (Maths, Applied Maths, Latin, Artistic Drawing, Scenical Arts or Musical Analysis)

=== Specific part ===
In this part the students can choose between 2 and 4 subjects (whatever you want depending on your specific "Bachillerato" and the specific weights published by each university) and can obtain a maximum of 4 extra points.

== The exam ==
Exams usually consist of choosing and completing four questions or problems in science-focused subjects from a selection of proposed questions. Other subjects, such as Spanish Language and Literature or History of Philosophy consist on a text which requires a writing task about it, theory questions and vocabulary. Every exam has two different options, A and B. The student must choose one and answer every question on that option. For some areas, like Physics or Chemistry, a table with constants (like Gravitational Constant or Avogradro Number) may be given. In "Matemáticas orientadas a las Ciencias Sociales" (Applied Maths) a table with the standard deviation is given.

Students can carry different materials depending on the exam:

- A ruler, a set of triangles and a compass for Technical Drawing.
- A scientific, non-graphic, non-programmable calculator for Mathematics, Applied Math, Physics, Chemistry, Economics, Technical Drawing, and Industrial Technology.
- Latin Dictionary for the Latin Exam and Greek Dictionary for the Greek Exam.

== Grading ==
With the new Selectividad exam, the final mark is no longer the average score of the six exams taken. Now, the four marks achieved in the Common Part are taken and an average score up to 10 points is given. Then, each University establishes different parameters for the other subjects taken in the Specific Part. For example, a student who took Spanish, English, History and Math got an average score of 8.55. Then they took Physics and Chemistry exams, and got a 9 and a 7. They want to study architecture, and the university they want to study at considers Physics more important than Chemistry at that degree, so their 9 will turn into 1.8 additional points (9*0.2) and Chemistry in 0.7 more points (7*0.1). The final score will be 8.55+1.8+0.7=11.05 out of 14 points possible. Other example: another student gets a 9 in the Common Part, and then she takes Economics and Physics. She will finally study law, so her Physics score will likely not to have effect in her final score, but Economics will be awarded with a 0.15 or 0.20 multiplier.

The mark in the Common Part lasts forever, but the one in the Specific Part needs to be renewed after two years if needed.

Grade = (g.p.a in Bachillerato * 0.6) + (arithmetic mean of the grades obtained in the general part * 0.4) + (Specific part Exam I * a) + (Specific part Exam II * b)

Where a and b are the weight (0, 0.1 or 0.2) of that specific test for the course and university you are applying for. The maximum grade is therefore 14.
