= Academic Awards in Spain =

There are three official Academic Awards in Spain.

At the end of each Academic year, students of Spain who attained the highest overall grades during their Graduate studies may be honored by the National Government, the Regional Government or the University, provided they pass a number of exams. The entire selection process lasts 2 months, and its ultimate goal is to recognize the best Graduate of that year nationwide (one for each Scientific discipline).

== University Award ==
The Extraordinary Award (Spanish: Premio Fin de Carrera) is conferred to the best student of each Graduate School. It can be requested by a graduate student who attained the highest overall graduation grade (“Outstanding”), which can be earned by a maximum of 1 of each 100 students. The Dean invites the 1% top students to a series of three exams, typically one per week. The First Exam is written, and consists of a number of questions related to any subject studied during the last 4–5 years. The Second Exam is oral, in which the student is challenged on a subject of his election. The Third Exam consists of the defense of an original work in the format of a Graduation Thesis.

Candidates are given marks on each exam, and the overall winner in a discipline is then awarded the Extraordinary Award by the University. The student is recognized in the Graduate Diploma as winner of the Award.

== Regional Award ==
Among the winners of the University Award within a Region, the Regional Government elects the student with the best marks and curriculum. Since these candidate students are already winners of University Awards, thus with the highest possible marks, the Government typically selects the student with most relevant publications in Scientific journals.

Results are published by the beginning of January, in order to give time to universities to submit their candidates.

There is one winner per Region (there are 17 Regions in Spain) and discipline (typically about 20). The student is recognized in the Graduate Diploma as winner of the Award, a medal is also awarded with a sum of money. The names of the winners are published in the “Official Bulletin” of the Region, in the form of a Ministerial Decree.

== National Graduation Award ==
The National Graduation Award for Higher University Education (in Spanish, “Premio Nacional Fin de Carrera”) has a long tradition in Spain’s Academic history. Some of the most renowned politicians and scientists of Spain won this award, thanks to which attracted the attention and support required to consolidate their careers.

The candidates are selected among the winners of Extraordinary Graduation Award. The Ministry of Science reviews the publications, academic works, curriculum, marks and other documentation submitted by the candidate for space of approximately one year.

Being the most prestigious academic award, it is conferred once a year by Spain’s Minister of Science to the Graduate student with the best Academic marks over the 5 years studies, granting one award per discipline for all Spain.

The names of the winners are made public by Ministerial Decree through Spain’s Official Bulletin (B.O.E.), where all laws must be published. A special Diploma is handed in a solemn ceremony presided by the Minister of Science. A sum of money is also paid. Finally, the recipient is honored by including a mention of the Award in the Graduate Diploma.

== See also ==
- Grading
- History of education in Spain
- List of oldest universities in continuous operation
- University of Santiago de Compostela
