= Education in Spain =

Ministry of Education
- Minister: Milagros Tolón

General details
- Primary languages: Spanish alongside co-official languages within respective regions, including Catalan, Basque and Galician
- System type: Democratic Constituchy (check for accuracy)

Literacy (2018 literacy rank =)
- Total: 98.44
- Male: 98.93
- Female: 97.97

Enrollment
- Total: 9,909,886
- Primary: 4,654,727
- Secondary: 2,730,036
- Post secondary: 1,633,358 (only accounts for University Students )

Attainment
- Secondary diploma: 80%
- Post-secondary diploma: 41%

Education in Spain is compulsory and free for all children aged between 6 and 16 years and is supported by the national government together with the governments of each of the country's 17 autonomous communities.

In Spain, primary school and secondary school are considered basic (obligatory) education. These are Primaria (6–12 years old) and Secundaria (12–16 years old).

As of 2020–21, Spain has 9,909,886 students. The largest group corresponds to primary education, with 4,654,727 students followed by secondary education with 2,730,036 and university students with 1,633,358. The smallest group is those in vocational education, with 887,710 students.

The Spanish education system is regulated by the Ley Orgánica 8/2013, de 9 de diciembre, para la mejora de la calidad educativa (LOMCE, Organic Law for the improvement of educational quality) that expands upon Article 27 of the Spanish Constitution of 1978.

Spain is working towards reforming vocational education and modernizing education to halt and reverse the rising unemployment rates.

== Competences ==
The Spanish Constitution of 1978 establishes that the national government as well as the autonomous communities have competences in the Education. The articles that are about that fact are the 148th and the 149th. The national government has the power to decide the academic and professional certificates and the requirements for their acquisition. It also establishes the subjects that are taught, the assessment criteria and its expression.

== Stages ==
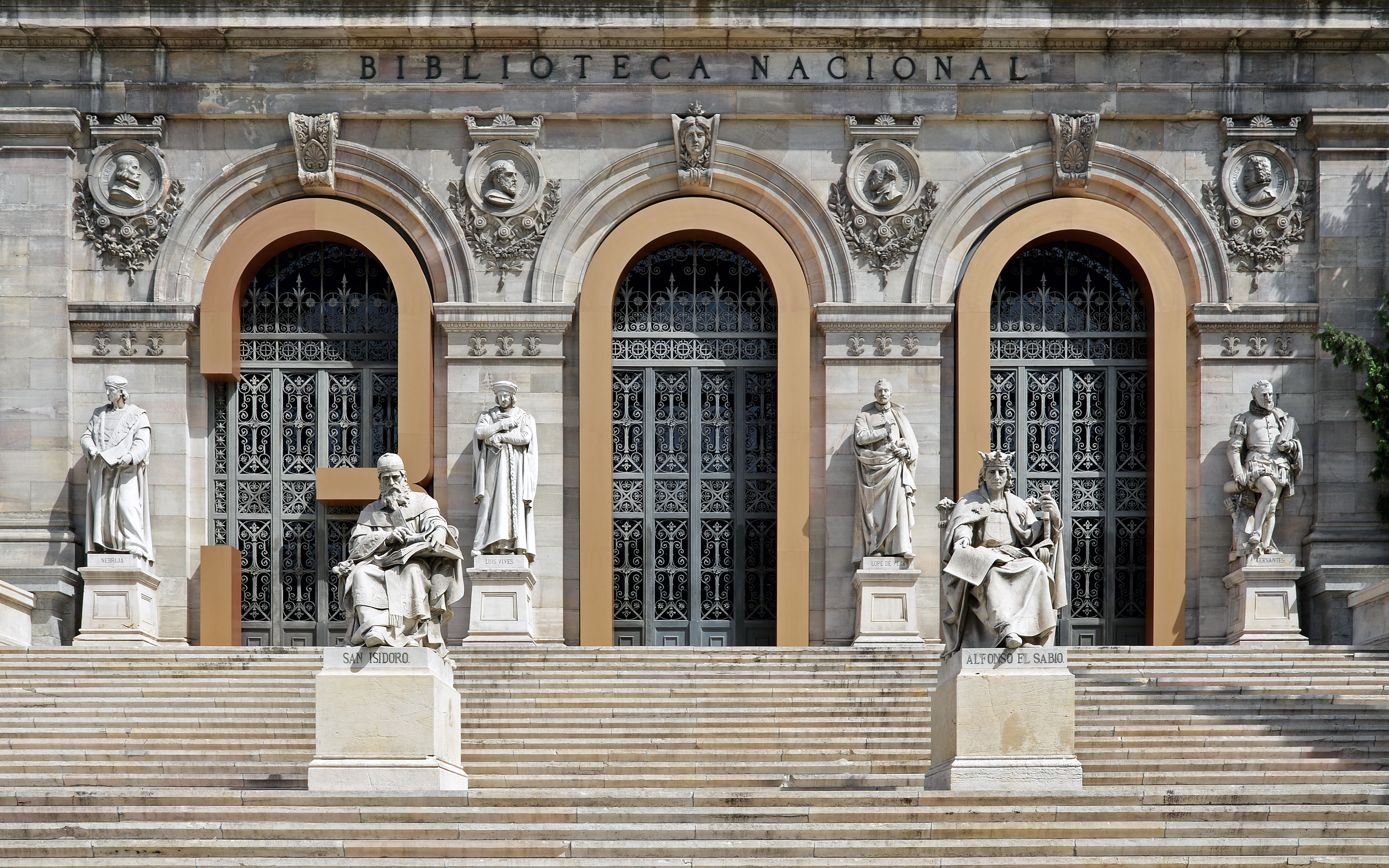
The Biblioteca Nacional de España (National Library of Spain)

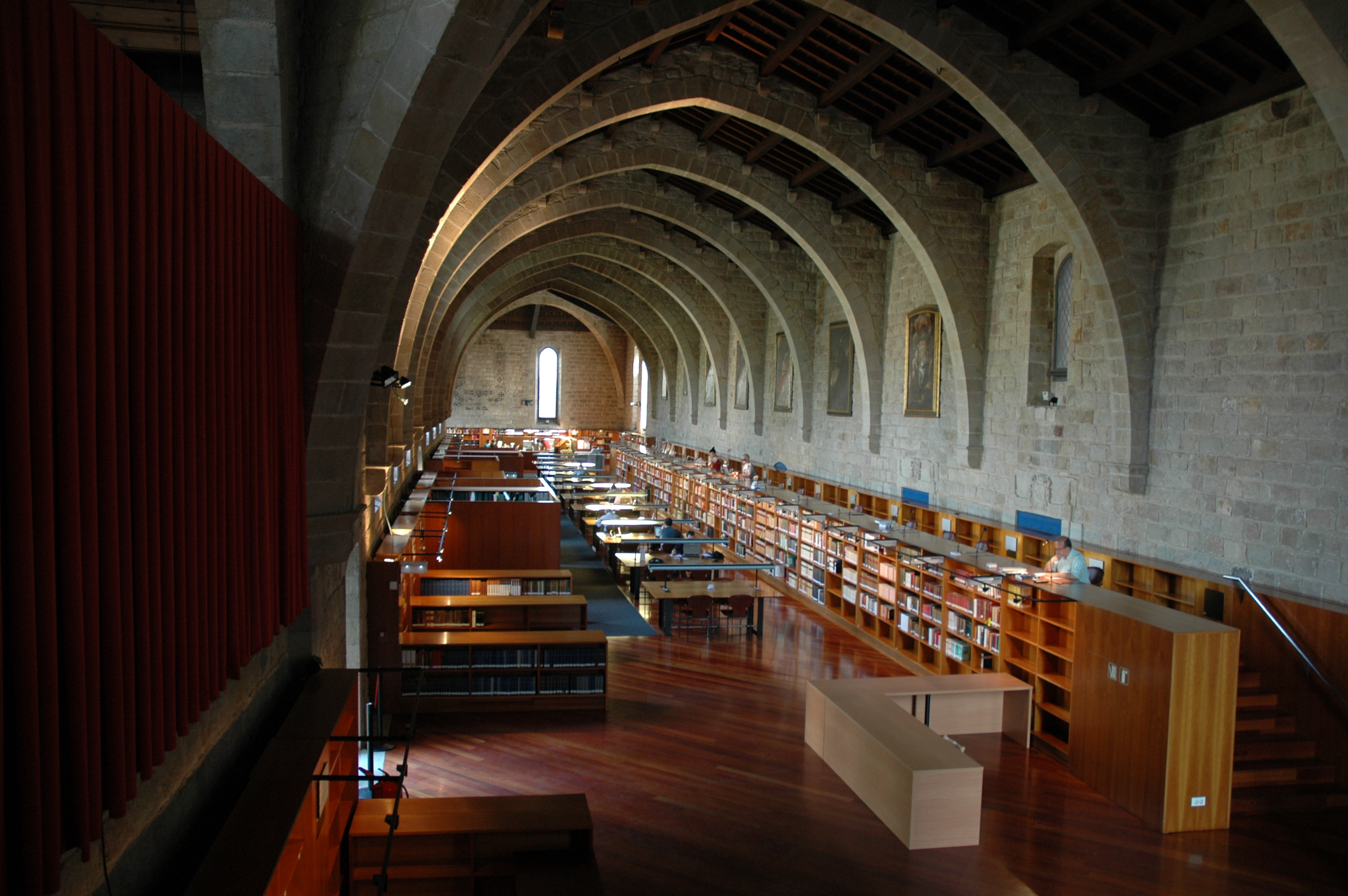
Library of Catalonia

=== Preschool education ===
Preescolar or Educación Infantil is encouraged for children under the age of six. There are two cycles of preschool which are divided by age; 0–3 years old and 3–6 years old.

The first cycle is often held in daycare centers or preschools, escuela infantil colloquially guardería, and most of the time it is not free for pupils, although some city councils offer scholarships for their public preschool centers with limited places.

The second cycle is free for all pupils enrolled in public schools that offer Educación Infantil (early childhood education), and is often held in Centro de Educación Infantil y Primaria, colloquially Colegio. The second cycle of preschool in public schools focus in on emotional development, movement and control of body habits, communication and language, and positive body image. The documents required for public registration include proof of residence, passport or residence card, or child's birth certificate, and, in some areas, proof of the child's vaccinations and a medical certificate of health.

=== Primary educations ===
Primaria or Educación Primaria, consists into six academic years, three cycles of two academic years each. Class groups are usually made up taking into account the year of birth, which usually leads to the following distribution of primary education students according to age and academic year:

- First year: 6-7 years old;
- Second year: 7-8 years old;
- Third year: 8-9 years old;
- Fourth year: 9-10 years old;
- Fifth year: 10-11 years old;
- Sixth year: 11-12 years old.

The curriculum includes core subjects such as Spanish language and literature, mathematics, natural sciences, social sciences and a first foreign language, usually English. Depending on the autonomous community, students may also study a co-official regional language such as Catalan, Galician, or Basque. Additional subjects commonly include physical education, music, arts education, civic and ethical values, and religion or an alternative subject. The stage is divided into three two-year cycles and is designed to provide students with foundational academic, social and communication skills.

=== Secondary education ===
Secundaria or Educación Secundaria Obligatoria (ESO) consists of four years, structured as two cycles, from the seventh to the tenth year:

- First Cycle: 1st and 2nd year ('core academic subjects' + basic social science)
- Second Cycle: 3rd and 4th year ('core' academic subjects + liberal studies + optional courses which relate to the specific ambitions of the student)

Subjects

First year of ESO (7th year)	Second year of ESO (8th year)	Third year of ESO (9th year)	Fourth year of ESO (10th year)
Biology and Geology	Biology and Geology. Physics and Chemistry	Biology and Geology. Physics and Chemistry	Students have to choose 2 of the following subjects: Biology and Geology, Economy, Physics and Chemistry, or Latin
Mathematics	Mathematics	Mathematics oriented to the academic teachings or Mathematics oriented to applied teachings	Mathematics oriented to the academic teachings
Geography and History	Geography and History	Geography and History	Geography and History
Spanish Language and Literature, as well as the co-official language, where applicable	Spanish Language and Literature, as well as the co-official language, where applicable	Spanish Language and Literature, as well as the co-official language, where applicable	Spanish Language and Literature, as well as the co-official language, where applicable
First Foreign Language (English)	First Foreign Language (English)	First Foreign Language (English)	First Foreign Language (English)
Physical Education (P.E.)	Physical Education	Physical Education	Physical Education
Religion or Ethical Values	Religion or Ethical Values	Religion or Ethical Values	Religion or Ethical Values
Some electives courses at some schools are the following: 1. Classical Culture; 2. Initiation to Entrepreneurial and Entrepreneurial Activity; 3. Music; 4. Technology; 5. Arts; 6. Second Foreign Language	Some electives courses at some schools are the following: 1. Classical Culture; 2. Initiation to Entrepreneurial and Entrepreneurial Activity; 3. Music; 4. Technology; 5. Arts; 6. Second Foreign Language	Some elective courses are the following: 1. Classical Culture; 2. Initiation to Entrepreneurial and Entrepreneurial Activity; 3. Music; 4. Technology; 5. Arts; 6. Second Foreign Language	Some elective courses are the following: 1. Scenic Arts and Dance; 2. Scientific Culture; 3. Classic Culture; 4. Philosophy; 5. Music; 6. ICT (Information and communications technology); 7. Second Foreign Language; 8. Arts

=== Post-16 education ===
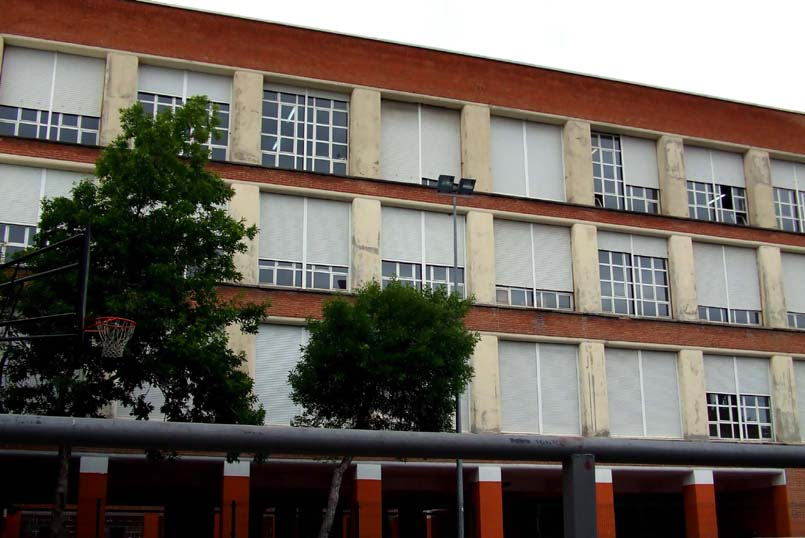
Instituto Ramiro de Maeztu public high school

Spanish Baccalaureate or Bachillerato consists of two optional additional final years in high school (mandatory education is until students are 16 years old), required if the student wants to attend university. Once students have finished Bachillerato, they can take their University Entrance Exam, Pruebas de Acceso a la Universidad (PAU), popularly called Selectividad. Selectividad is composed of two parts: the "general" section, which is mandatory for everyone, and the "specific" section, which consists of focus topics based on the students' academic interests and is theoretically optional. Selectividad is scored out of 14 points and students grade average and this score is then used to calculate students overall grade point average. In fact, 60% of this overall score is composed based on the students' GPA in Bachillerato and 40% of the score is based on the Selectividad grade.

Subjects

First year of Baccalaureate (11th year)	Second year of Baccalaureate (12th year)
Spanish Language and Literature, as well as the co-official language, where applicable	Spanish Language and Literature, as well as the co-official language, where applicable
First Foreign Language (English)	First Foreign Language (English)
Philosophy	History of Philosophy
Physical Education	History of Spain
Science: Mathematics I Social Science:Mathematics oriented to social sciences I Humanities: Latin I Arts: Basics of Art I	Science: Mathematics II; Social Science:Mathematics oriented to social sciences II Humanities: Latin II; Arts: Basics of Art II
Students have to choose 2 of the following subjects:	Students have to choose 2 of the following subjects:
Science: Biology, Geology, Technical Drawing, Physics, Chemistry and Industrial Technology.	Science: Biology, Technical Drawing, Geology, Physics, Chemistry or Industrial Technology.
Social Science or Humanities: Economy, Greek, Contemporary World History or Universal Literature.	Social Science or Humanities: Business Economics, Greek, Art History, Geography.
Arts: Audiovisual Culture, Contemporary World History or Universal Literature.	Arts: Audiovisual Culture, Scenic Arts or Design.
Some elective courses are the following: 1. Musical Analysis; 2. Second Foreign Language; 3. Applied Anatomy; 4. ICT (Information and communications technology); 5. Artistic Drawing; 6. Volume; 7. Musical Language and Practice; 8. Religion	Some elective courses are the following: 1. Musical Analysis; 2. Artistic Drawing; 3. Fundamentals of Administration and Management; 4. Religion; 5. History of Music and Dance; 6. Image and Sound; 7. Psychology; 8. Sociology; 9. Graphics and Plastics Arts; 10. Second Foreign Language; 11. ICT (Information and communications technology); 12. History of Philosophy

=== Universities ===
Higher education in Spain is provided through a network of public and private universities, as well as specialized higher education institutions. Spanish universities offer undergraduate, master's and doctoral degrees in accordance with the European Higher Education Area (EHEA) established under the Bologna Process. Most undergraduate programmes (grados) require four years of study, while master's degrees generally last one or two years.

Some of Spain's oldest and most prominent universities include the University of Salamanca, founded in 1218, the Complutense University of Madrid, and the University of Barcelona. Spain also has a number of internationally oriented private business schools and institutions specializing in fields such as engineering, business administration and tourism.

== Vocational education ==
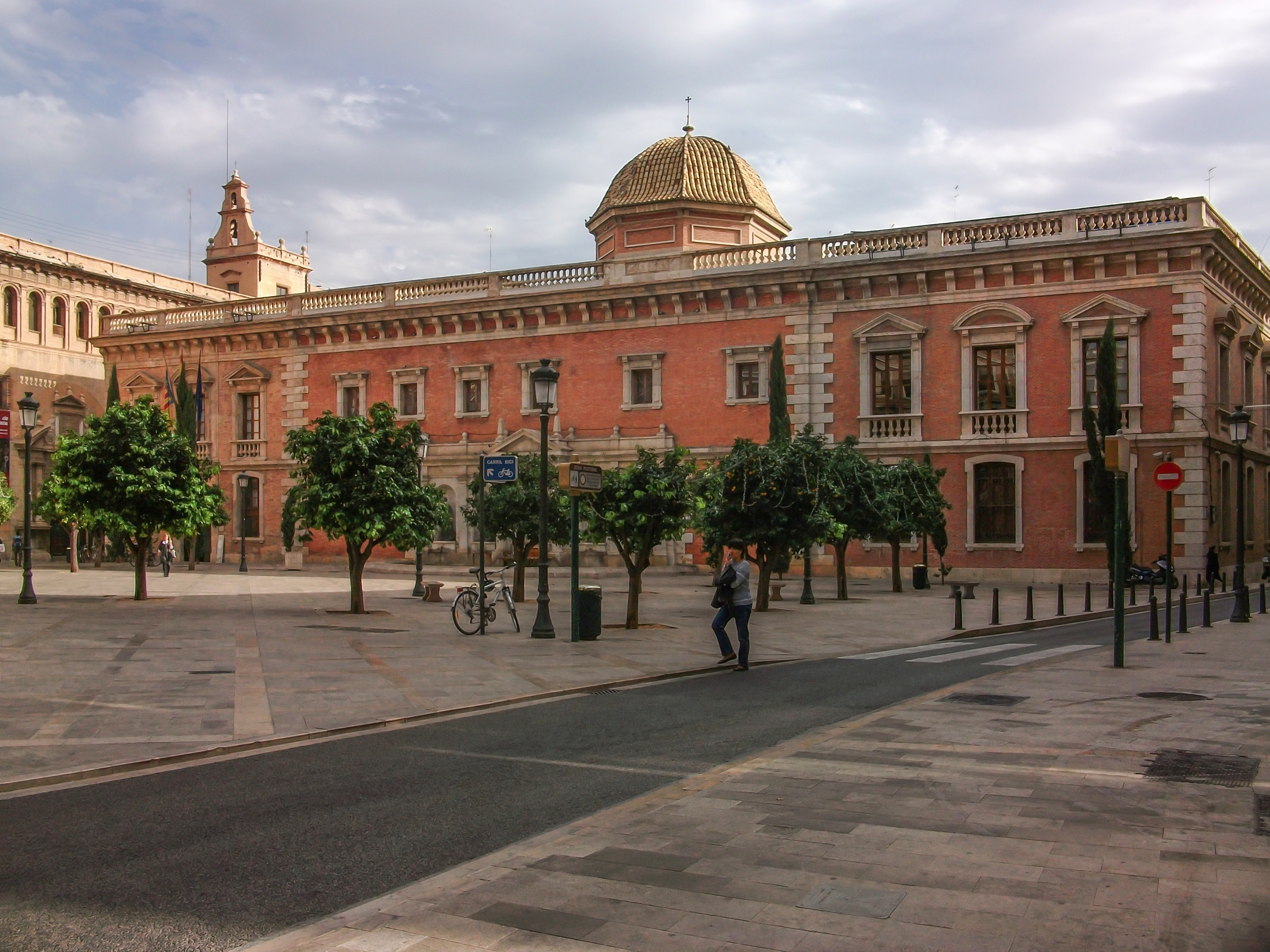
University of Valencia oldest in the Valencian Community

There are three levels of education for professional skills acquisition besides the university education. These levels are Formación Profesional Básica or FPB (basic vocational education); Ciclo Formativo de Grado Medio or CFGM (medium level vocational education), which can be studied after the secondary education; and the Ciclo Formativo de Grado Superior or CFGS (higher level vocational education), which can be studied after the post-16 education.

There are 26 groups for these degrees and they include them by professional areas. 18 courses can be studied in the FPB, 62 in CFGM and 90 in CFGS.

== Schools ==
Schools in Spain can be divided into 3 categories:

- State schools (colegios públicos)
- Privately run schools funded by the State (colegios concertados)
- Purely private schools (colegios privados)

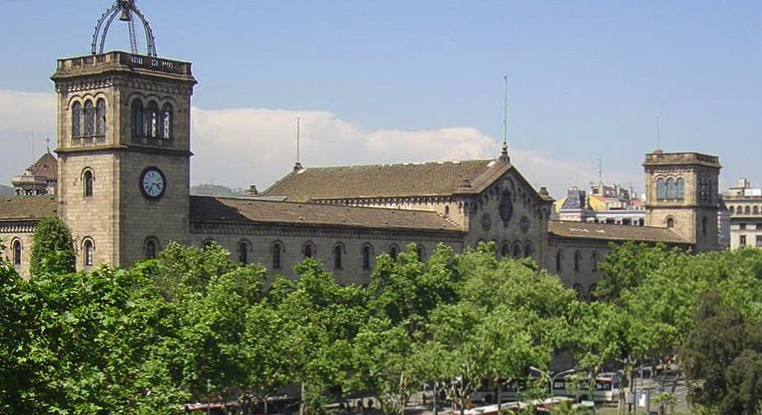
University of Barcelona (UB) acclaimed for its prolific research output and extensive range of academic disciplines.

According to summary data for the year 2008-2009 from the ministry, state schools educated 67.4%, private but state funded schools 26.0%, and purely private schools 6.6% of pupils the preceding year. Usually, primaria is studied in a colegio and ESO and bachillerato are studied in an instituto. However, some schools only teach elementary school (K-6). K-12 schools also exist, although they are private schools or privately run schools funded by the State (colegios concertados). There are private schools for all the range of compulsory education. At them, parents must pay a monthly/termly/yearly fee. Most of these schools are run by religious orders, and also include single-sex schools.

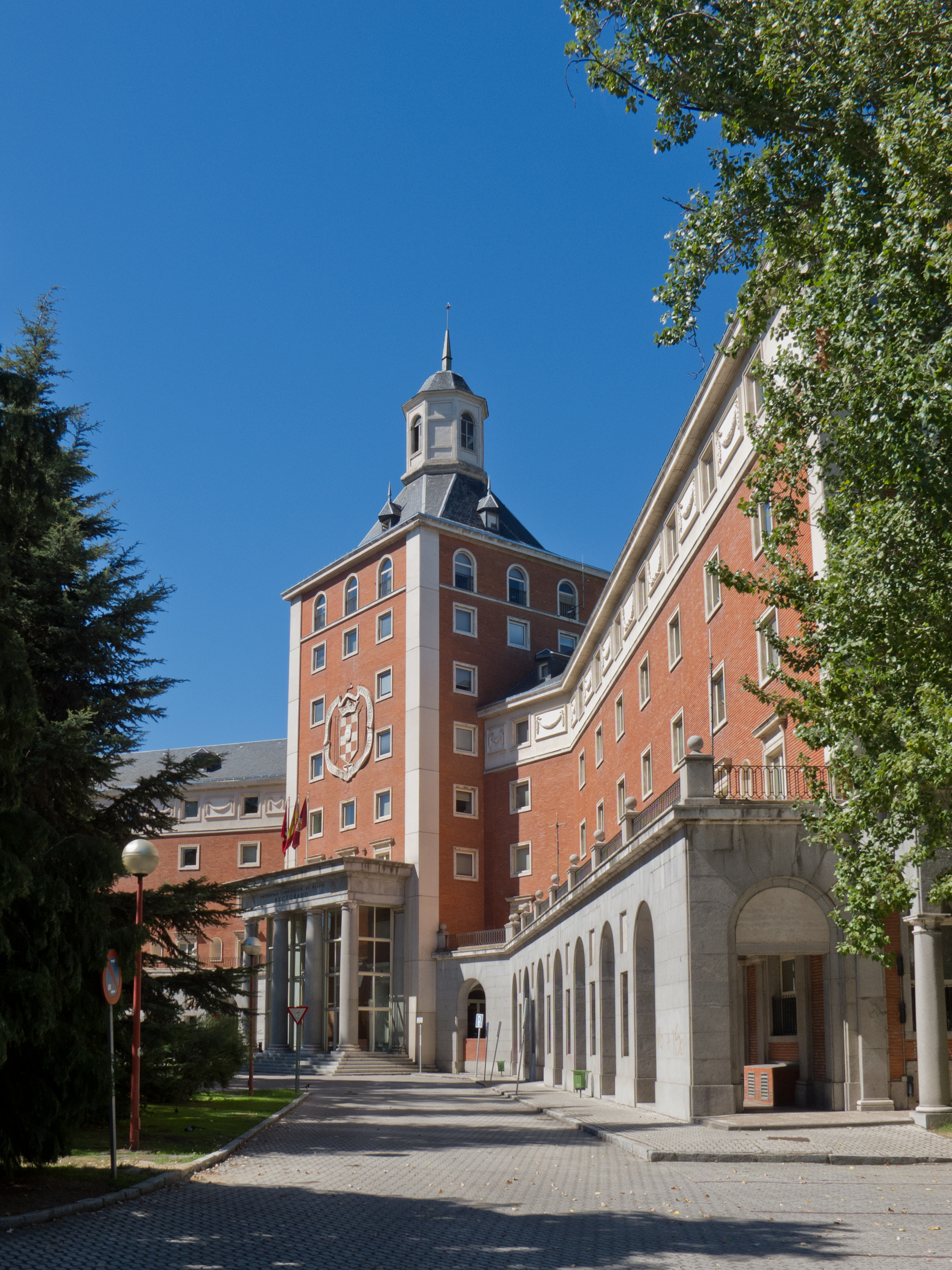
Complutense University of Madrid (UCM) offers a wide range of undergraduate and postgraduate courses.

All non-university state education is free in Spain, but parents have to buy (or make a contribution towards) their children's books and materials. (Subsidies, loans or second hand book sales are offered by Spain's Autonomous Regions (Comunidades), in some schools and by some local councils.) This, nominally at least, also applies to colegios concertados. Many schools are concertados, state funded up to the end of Primaria but purely private for the high school years. This drop in the proportion of pupils in educación concertada is matched by increases of approximately equal size in the proportion in both state and purely private education for ESO and Bachillerato.

Schools supply a list of what is required at the start of each school year and which will include art and craft materials as well as text and exercise books. From 2009, this figure was around £300 and in 2011 was nearer £500; as of 2011, the cost of books averaged 170 euros for preschool and 300 euros for elementary school students. In some regions, the autonomous government is giving tokens to exchange them in bookshops for free. This was adapted in 2006 in regions such as Andalusia, where pupils from 3 to 10 years old will get the books for free, and in subsequent years it is expected for all compulsory years. School uniform is not normally worn in state schools but is usually worn in private schools.

There is a largely uniform admissions process for state funded schools, both colegios públicos and colegios concertados. The main admissions procedures for pupils wishing to join a school in the autumn are carried out in the spring of the year in question.

Parents can choose the school to which they wish to send their child. It is not uncommon for there to be insufficient places in a popular school for all the children for whom places are requested. In such cases, places are allocated according to rather strictly defined admissions criteria as defined in Annex IX to the order establishing the process.

=== Public schools ===
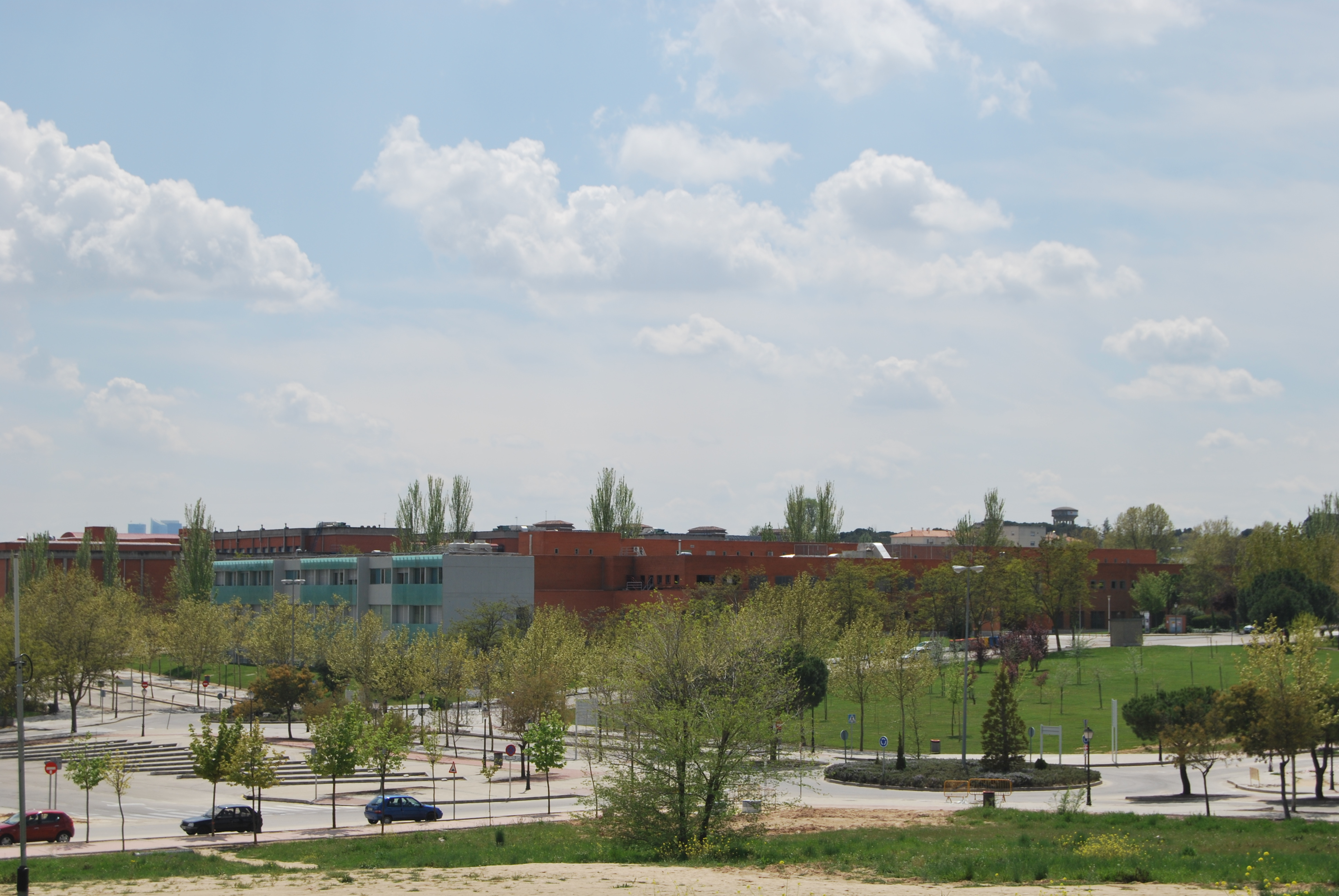
Autonomous University of Madrid (UAM) consistently ranks high in national and international university ranking

Schools run directly by the public authorities or privately with public assistance (concertada) provide education free of charge, but (depending on the family's financial status), parents may be required to supply consumables such as textbooks and school uniforms as well as contributing to after school activities.

Primaria public schools (6–12 years old) are called centro de educación infantil y primaria (CEIP), colloquially colegio or cole, and secundaria public schools (12–16 years old) are called instituto de enseñanza secundaria (IES), colloquially instituto. Public (state) schools in Spain are free.

=== Private schools ===
Private schools in Spain include secular, religious and international institutions. Some teach primarily in Spanish, while others offer bilingual or trilingual education, often with English as a second language. Private education is generally more expensive than public schooling, and many of these institutions are affiliated with the Catholic Church.

Some privately managed schools operate under the ''educación concertada'' system, receiving partial state funding while following the national curriculum. Fully private and international schools may follow foreign curricula such as the British or American systems or offer programmes like the International Baccalaureate (IB).

== School terms ==
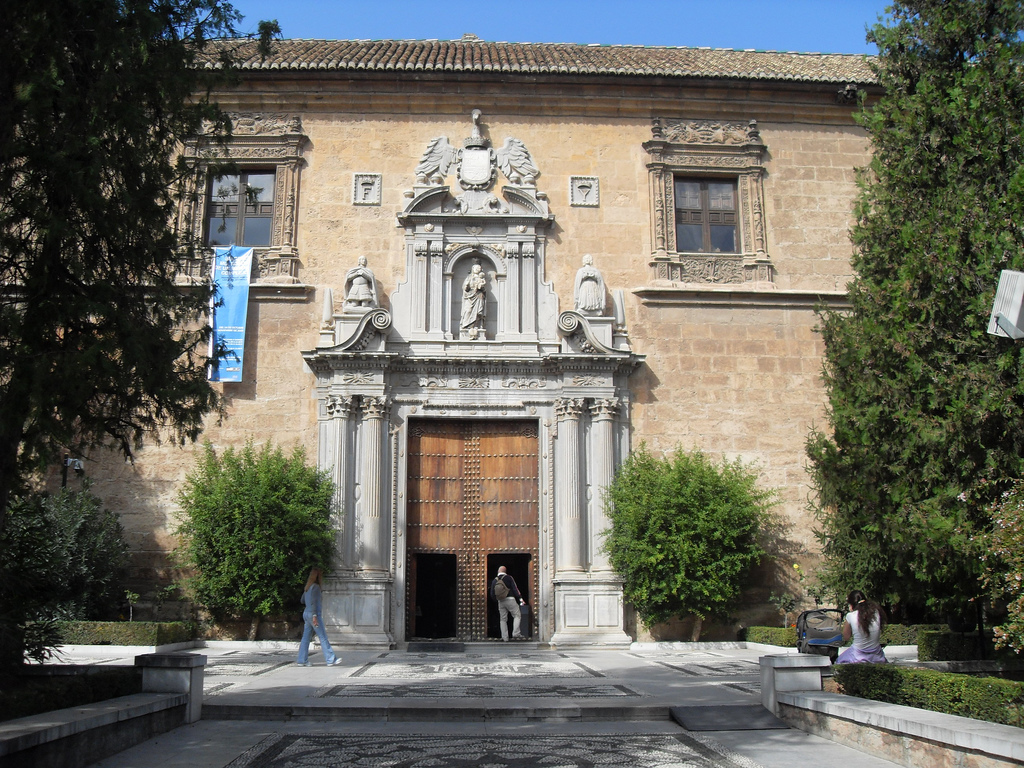
University of Granada renowned for its strong programs in humanities, sciences, and technology

Broadly similar to the British three-term system, but with slightly shorter holidays at Christmas (22 December – 7 January) and Easter (one week - 40 days after Ash Wednesday), and longer in the summer (normally from 23 June to 15 September). In 2005, the summer holiday ran from 22 June until 1–15 September, depending on the regions. The British half-term holiday does not exist, but there are frequent odd days and long weekends relating mainly to religious holidays and regional and national holidays. Schools use the trimester system (September to December, January to March/April, March/April to June).

== Bilingual teaching models ==
In Spain, Spanish coexists with Basque, Catalan and Galician as the medium of instruction. Aranese (Aranés) is official in a small area of Catalonia and primary education is offered in this language. The linguistic model chosen by the regions with their own language varies per community.

=== Basque regions ===
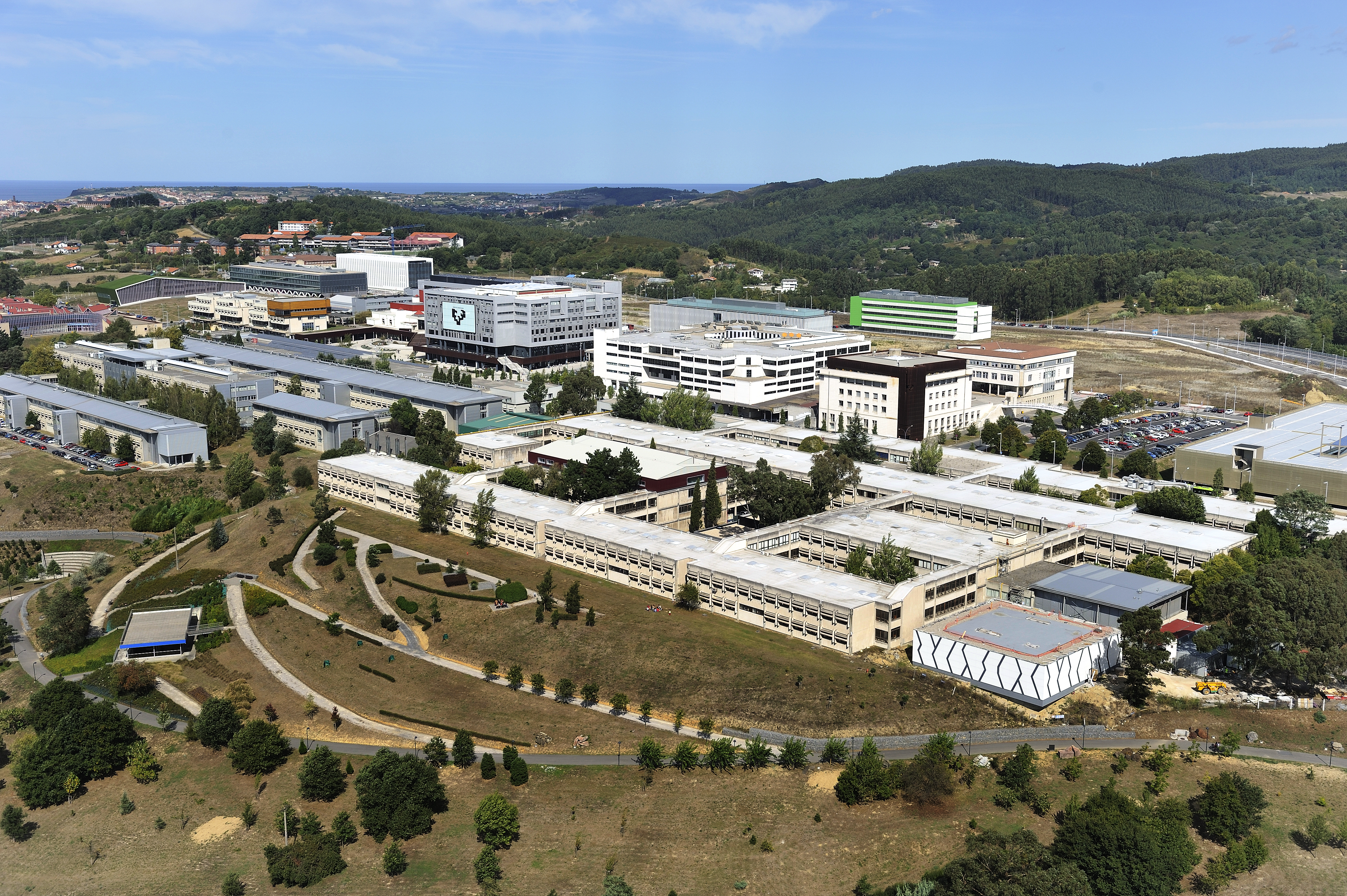
University of the Basque Country

Basque Country historically provided three teaching models: A, B or D. Model D, with education entirely in Basque, and Spanish as a compulsory subject, is the most widely chosen model by parents. In addition, Navarre offers the G model, with education entirely in Spanish, without a Basque language subject option. Model A offers Spanish as tuition language and Basque is learnt as a language subject. Model B offers 50% of the classes in Spanish and Basque.

The Basque Country approved its bilingual model in a decree of 1983. Navarre enacted its corresponding decree in 1988.

=== Catalan regions ===
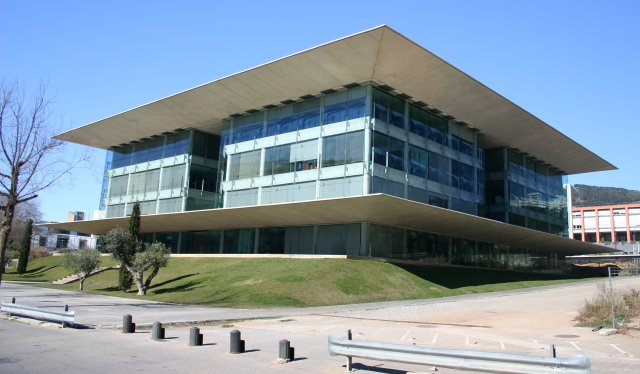
Polytechnic University of Catalonia

Catalonia and the Balearic Islands employ language immersion in Catalan.

After the 1970s, when Spain became a democracy, Catalonia was given rights over its own education system. A law passed in 1983, "Llei de Normalització Lingüística a Catalunya", defined the language immersion system of Catalonia. By 1986 the entire region had already switched to it.

The Balearic Islands took more time to make language immersion effective. A decree enacted in 1997 established that Catalan must be used in at least 50% of lessons. Schools have freedom to add more lessons, and usually they do.

Valencian Community offers different levels of immersion in Catalan (also known as Valencian in this territory), with the highest level having the widest adoption. Before implementing that model, the community offered two paths. One path taught Catalan in the Catalan language subject and used it as tuition language in either Social or Natural Science. The other path provided immersion in Catalan, approaching the level of the newer advanced immersion.

The immersion models have faced strong opposition by Spanish nationalists. They allege that schools are used as indoctrination centres and that this imposes barriers which worsens academic performance. There is no serious investigation that proves that academic results are worse for bilingual students. Also proficiency in Spanish amongst Catalan students is the same as the Spanish average.

=== Galician regions ===
In Galicia, Galician is used as tuition language in 50% of classes, except in preschool education which uses the majority mother tongue. This model approved by the People's Party has received criticism from the European Council.

=== Asturleonese regions ===
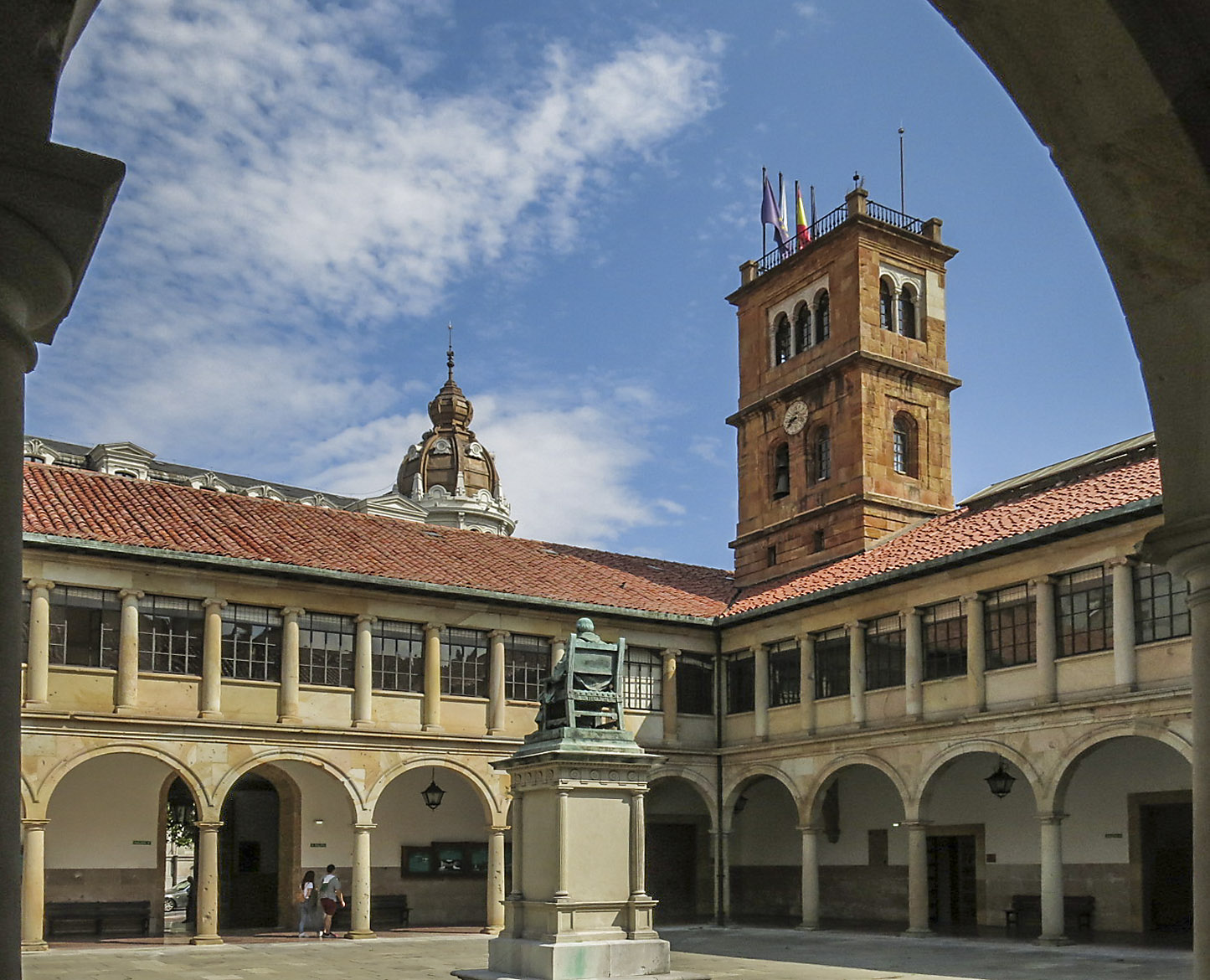
University of Oviedo building in Oviedo

Although Spanish is the official language of all schools in the Principality of Asturias, in many schools children are allowed to take Asturian-language classes from age 6 to 16. Elective classes are also offered from 16 to 19. Asturian is not co-official in the principality, but is protected by law (Ley 1/1998, de 23 de marzo, de uso y promoción del bable/asturiano — "Law 1/1998, of 23 March, of Use and Promotion of Bable/Asturian")

Leonese is not official or used in education in the Autonomous community of Castile and León, and Extramaduran is not recognised or official in Extramadura.

=== Aragonese regions ===
The 1997 Aragonese law of languages stipulated that Aragonese (and Catalan) speakers had a right to the teaching of and in their own language. Following this, Aragonese lessons started in schools in the 1997–1998 academic year. It was originally taught as an extra-curricular, non-evaluable voluntary subject in four schools. However, whilst legally schools can choose to use Aragonese as the language of instruction, as of the 2013–2014 academic year, there are no recorded instances of this option being taken in primary or secondary education. In fact, the only current scenario in which Aragonese is used as the language of instruction is in the Aragonese philology university course, which is optional, taught over the summer and in which only some of the lectures are in Aragonese.

=== Occitan (Aranese) in Val d'Aran ===
The protection of Aranese, a dialect of Occitan, is guaranteed in Article 3.4 of Catalonia's 1979 Statute of Autonomy. Subsequently, Law 7/1983, on linguistic normalization, declares Aranese the language of Aran, proclaims certain linguistic rights of the Aranese and directs public service to guarantee its usage and teaching. Aranese is taught on all levels of compulsory education and has been the medium of instruction in the Aran Valley since 1984.

=== Fala in Extremadura ===
Fala is not recognised or official regionally in Extramadura, and not used in education.

== International education ==
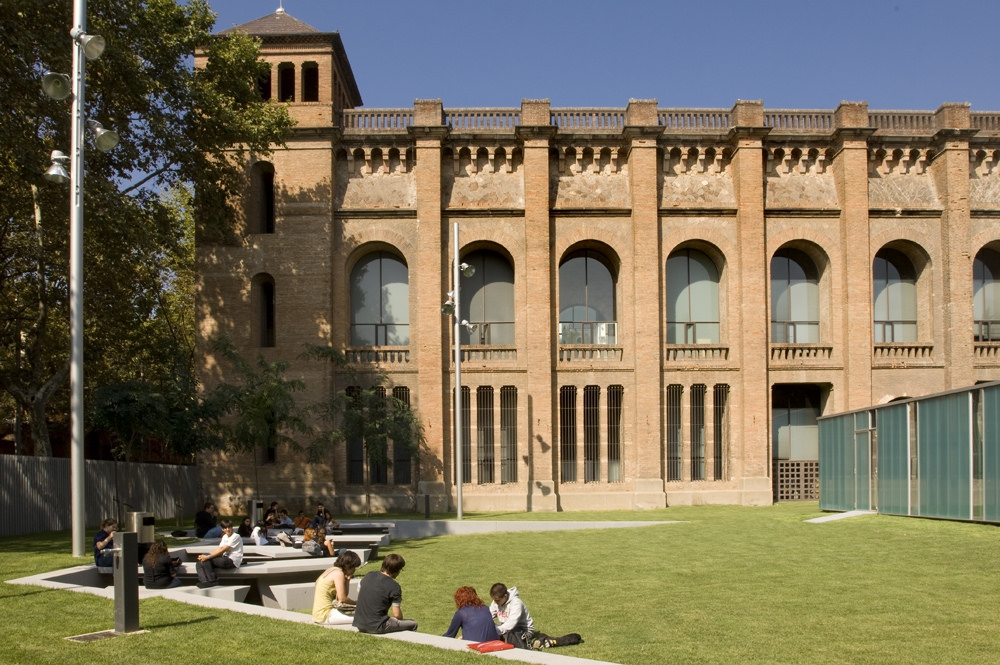
Pompeu Fabra University known for its focus on social sciences, humanities, communication, and information technology.

As of January 2015, the International Schools Consultancy (ISC) listed Spain as having 210 international schools. ISC defines an 'international school' in the following terms "ISC includes an international school if the school delivers a curriculum to any combination of pre-school, primary or secondary students, wholly or partly in English outside an English-speaking country, or if a school in a country where English is one of the official languages, offers an English-medium curriculum other than the country's national curriculum and is international in its orientation." This definition is used by publications including The Economist. In 1977 the International Baccalaureate authorized the first school in Spain to teach the Diploma Programme. There are now 86 IB World Schools in Spain, of which 71 deliver an international education but in Spanish.

== See also ==
- Academic Awards in Spain
- Asociación de Inspectores de Educación
- History of education in Spain
- Open access in Spain
- Tuition fees in Spain
