= Spanish Baccalaureate =

Spanish top level of secondary education

The Spanish Baccalaureate (Spanish: Bachillerato, pronounced [batʃiʎeˈɾato]) (Note: Catalan: Batxillerat; Basque: Batxilergo; Galician: Bacharelato; Occitan: Bachillerat) is a post-16 two-year optional education course in Spain. It follows compulsory secondary education (Eduación Secundaria Obligatoria, ESO) and is required to enter university.

The course is divided in different branches or modalities, giving students the ability to choose between different subjects of study. After completing the Bachillerato, students may take the university admission exams, known as the "PAU" or "Selectividad", required to enter both public and private universities.

Bachillerato also gives the option for students to enter higher vocational courses (known as Ciclos Formativos de Grado Superior). It is comparable to the French Baccalaureate in France or the International Baccalaureate.

== History ==
From the 13th century up to the 17th or 18th century, in Spain (and Hispanic America) the term Bachiller referred to the lower grade of university studies, enabling entry to a profession without reaching the higher grades of licenciado or doctorado.

Before 1953 in Spain, the term bachillerato covered all of secondary education, which was taken after passing an entrance examination by those students expected to go to university. It consisted of seven yearly stages, normally taken between the ages of 10 and 17. On completion, students took a State Examination (Examen de Estado). From 1949 there was also a vocational or technical version (Bachillerato Laboral).

In 1953 the bachillerato was divided into two parts: Bachillerato Elemental (elementary) and Bachillerato Superior (higher). The first was taken over four years, at ages 10–14, and the second over two years at 15 and 16; each stage terminated with a final examination (Reválida). Students who had remained in primary education up to the age of 14, on passing the first-stage Reválida, could still enter the Bachillerato Superior, in which there were two branches: Sciences and Arts. Following this, students could take a one-year stage of pre-university studies (Preuniversitario, or "Preu" for short).

Reforms during the 1970s absorbed the Bachillerato Elemental into the upper stages of the basic education system for 6- to 14-year-olds, and replaced the Bachillerato Superior with a three-year Bachillerato Unificado Polivalente (BUP). At the age of 14 a student could now opt to enter the BUP without having to pass a specific test, or could go into vocational training. The "Preu" was replaced by a Curso de Orientación Universitaria (COU).

In the 1990s, a huge education system reform took place with the "LOGSE". The Bachillerato became a two-year course following the completion of compulsory education (Educación Secundaria Obligatoria, ESO), with middle-grade vocational training as an alternative. It had five branches: Arts, Technology, Social Sciences, Health Sciences, and Humanities. Further reforms were made under the "LOE" of 2006, and under the "LOMCE" of 2013.

== Present ==
The Baccalaureate is currently regulated by the Ley Orgánica 3/2020 (LOMLOE) and its implementing Real Decreto 243/2022. It is studied over two years, usually upon the completion of compulsory secondary education (ESO). Under the LOMLOE, there are four modalities: Arts (two paths), Sciences and Technology, Humanities and Social Sciences (with two "itineraries" for the Humanities and Social Sciences branch) and General. The latter was introduced by the LOMLOE reforms and took effect from the 2023-24 school year.

Arts
Sciences and Technology
Humanities
Humanities and Social Sciences
Social Sciences

As in the compulsory primary and secondary stages of education, in the Baccalaureate there is a distinction between "core subjects", "specialist subjects" and "subjects chosen by the Autonomous Community" — this last category denotes the language and literature of the regional co-official language (Catalan, Valencian, Basque or Galician), if any. The national Government determines a set of core subjects, while the educational administrations of the autonomous communities may specify additional core subjects and will decide upon the list of non-core subjects.

Admission to the Baccalaureate is subject to a certificate of completion of compulsory secondary education (Graduado en Educación Secundaria Obligatoria), or certain technical qualifications.

=== First year ===
In the first year, "general" core subjects (brown background in the table) are taught, together with "optional" core subjects (white background), of which two are chosen in each modality, and specified subjects (green background).

==== Core subjects ====
FIRST YEAR OF BACCALAUREATE
| Fine Arts, Image and Design | Music and Performing Arts | Sciences | Humanities | Social sciences | General |
| Spanish Language and Literature I and, if any, Co-official Language and Literature I | Spanish Language and Literature I and, if any, Co-official Language and Literature I | Spanish Language and Literature I and, if any, Co-official Language and Literature I | Spanish Language and Literature I and, if any, Co-official Language and Literature I | Spanish Language and Literature I and, if any, Co-official Language and Literature I | Spanish Language and Literature I and, if any, Co-official Language and Literature I |
| Philosophy | Philosophy | Philosophy | Philosophy | Philosophy | Philosophy |
| First Foreign Language I | First Foreign Language I | First Foreign Language I | First Foreign Language I | First Foreign Language I | First Foreign Language I |
| Physical Education | Physical Education | Physical Education | Physical Education | Physical Education | Physical Education |
| Religion or Transversal Projects of Education in Values | Religion or Transversal Projects of Education in Values | Religion or Transversal Projects of Education in Values | Religion or Transversal Projects of Education in Values | Religion or Transversal Projects of Education in Values | Religion or Transversal Projects of Education in Values |
| Artistic Drawing I | Musical Analysis I or Performing Arts I | Mathematics I | Latin I | Maths for Social Sciences I | General Maths |
| Technical Drawing for Fine Arts and Design I | Musical Analysis I or Performing Arts I (the one not chosen above) | Biology, Geology and Environmental Sciences | Ancient Greek I | History of the Contemporary World | Economy, Entrepreneurship and Business |
| Volume | Music Language and Practice | Physics and Chemistry | World Literature | Economics | Another first-year subject of any modality |
| Audiovisual Culture | Choir and Vocal Technique I | Technical Drawing I | History of the Contemporary World | World Literature | |
| Artistic Projects | Audiovisual Culture | Technology and Engineering I | Economics | Ancient Greek I | |
| Specialist subjects of the Autonomous Communities | Specialist subjects of the Autonomous Communities | Specialist subjects of the Autonomous Communities | Specialist subjects of the Autonomous Communities | Specialist subjects of the Autonomous Communities | Specialist subjects of the Autonomous Communities |

==== Specialist subjects ====
Specialist subjects, of which either two or three are to be chosen, depending on provision at the education centre:

1. Anthropology and Sociology
2. Applied Anatomy
3. Artificial Intelligence
4. Biomedicine
5. Computer Science I
6. Contemporary Artistic Languages
7. Digital Creation and Computational Thinking
8. Education for Democratic Coexistence I
9. Energy Resources and Sustainability
10. Entrepreneurial and Business Culture
11. European Union
12. Human Biology and Health
13. Information and Communication Technologies I
14. Legal and Democratic Culture
15. Music Production
16. Oratory
17. Personal and Vocational Training and Guidance
18. Photographic Creation and Film
19. Psychology
20. Scientific Culture
21. Second Foreign Language I
22. Society, Environment and Sustainable Territories
23. The Classical Legacy
24. Another first-year subject not taken by the student

=== Second year ===
==== Core subjects ====
In the second year, "general" core subjects (brown background in the table) are taught, together with "optional" core subjects (white background), of which two are chosen in each modality.

SECOND YEAR OF BACCALAUREATE
| Art | Sciences | Humanities | Social sciences |
|---|---|---|---|
| Spanish Language and Literature II and, if any, Co-official Language and Literature II | Spanish Language and Literature II and, if any, Co-official Language and Literature II | Spanish Language and Literature II and, if any, Co-official Language and Literature II | Spanish Language and Literature II and, if any, Co-official Language and Literature II |
| History of Spain | History of Spain | History of Spain | History of Spain |
| First Foreign Language II | First Foreign Language II | First Foreign Language II | First Foreign Language II |
| History of Philosophy | History of Philosophy | History of Philosophy | History of Philosophy |
| Art Foundation II | Mathematics II | Latin II | Maths for Social Sciences II |
| Scenic Arts | Biology | Business Economics | Business Economics |
| Design | Technical drawing II | Geography | Geography |
| Audiovisual culture II | Physics | History of Art | History of Art |
| | Geology | Greek II | Greek II |
| | Chemistry | | |
| | Technology and Engineering II | | |

==== Specialist subjects ====
Specialist subjects, of which between two and four are to be chosen, depending on provision at the education centre:

1. Musical analysis II
2. Earth Sciences and Environmental Sciences
3. Artistic Drawing II
4. Technical Drawing II
5. Foundations of Administration and Management
6. History of Music and Dance
7. Image and Sound
8. Psychology
9. Religion
10. Second Foreign Language II
11. Techniques of Graphic-Plastic Expression
12. Industrial Technology II
13. ICT II
14. Material from the block of core subjects not taken by the student

=== Provision for adults ===
Other means of study are especially designed for adults who wish to re-take their studies. These form part of the standard educational provision of some institutes, and are also offered in separate adult education centres.

The "nocturnal" version is provided on a timetable of evening classes. The details may vary according to location, but normally there are four teaching periods of 50 minutes with a 30-minute break in the middle, between 4pm and 10pm. To cater for working adults with less time to study, individual subjects are assessed annually; thus a pass in a subject, once obtained, remains valid in following years. The course content, however, is identical with what is taught at a daytime school.
