= Mario Conde. Los días de gloria =

Spanish television miniseries

- Genre: Biopic; Political thriller
- Based on: Los días de gloria by Mario Conde
- Screenplay by: Helena Medina
- Directed by: Salvador Calvo
- Starring: Daniel Grao; Francesc Orella; Mariona Ribas; Juan Carlos Vellido
- Country of origin: Spain
- Original language: Spanish
- No. of seasons: 1
- No. of episodes: 2

Production
- Production companies: Mediaset España; DLO Producciones

Original release
- Network: Telecinco
- Release: 4 July – 11 July 2013

Mario Conde. Los días de gloria (transl. 'Mario Conde. The Glory Days') is a two-part Spanish television miniseries. It is an adaptation of the Mario Conde's memoir Los días de gloria, portraying the 1993 intervention of Banesto. Directed by Salvador Calvo and starring Daniel Grao in the leading role, it aired in 2013 on Telecinco.

== Premise ==
The plot accounts for the Mario Conde's meteoric rise together with his friend Juan Abelló in the banking system, that ended up with the 1993 intervention of Banesto (chaired by Conde) by the Bank of Spain and a 20-year prison sentence eventually handed to Conde.

== Cast ==
- Daniel Grao as Mario Conde.
- Mariona Ribas as Lourdes Arroyo.
- Juan Carlos Vellido as Arturo Romaní.
- Francesc Orella as Juan Abelló.
- Pedro Casablanc as Mariano Rubio, the Governor of the Bank of Spain.
- Manolo Solo as Carlos Solchaga.
- Enrique Arce as Fernando Garro.
- Jaime Pujol as Luis Ángel Rojo.
- Úrsula Corberó as Paloma Aliende.
- Mikel Tello as César Mora.
- Berta Gómez as Ana Gamazo.
- José Luis Patiño as Narcís Serra.
- Jordi Díaz as Miguel Martín.
- Manuel Regueiro as Alberto Cortina.
- Jesús Noguero as Alberto Alcocer.
- Ángel Hidalgo as King Juan Carlos.
- Manuel de Blas as Don Juan de Borbón.
- José Chaves as Felipe González.
- Jaime G. Arija as José María Aznar.

== Production and release ==
Produced by Mediaset España in collaboration with DLO Producciones, the miniseries was an adaptation of the memoir book Los días de gloria by Mario Conde, who was reportedly initially satisfied with the result and even lent part of his personal clothing. The screenplay was authored by Helena Medina, whereas the two parts were directed by Salvador Calvo. Filmed across the Madrid region, shooting locations included the former Banesto headquarters in the calle de Alcalá, the Casa de América, the Palace of Fernán Núñez, the Palace of Santa Coloma, the Museo Geominero, the former Conde's residence in the Calle de Triana, a rural estate in Alcobendas and a house in Torrelodones. Despite his early positive views on the series, Conde harshly criticised the removal of a scene concerning a conversation with the King, which was left unaired.

Series	Episodes	Originally released		Ref.
Series	Episodes	First released	Last released	Ref.
1	2	4 July 2013	11 July 2013	

This is a caption
No.	Title	Directed by	Written by	Viewers	Original release date	Share (%)
1	"Primera parte"	Salvador Calvo	Helena Medina	1,689,000	4 July 2013	11.0
2	"Segunda parte"	Salvador Calvo	Helena Medina	1,395,000	11 July 2013	9.7
