= Rosa García García =

- Date of birth: January 17, 1965
- Place of birth: Spain Madrid, Spain
- Nationality: Spanish
- Occupation: CEO of Siemens Spain
- Independent Advisor: Acerinox
- Website: I+deas21 Blog

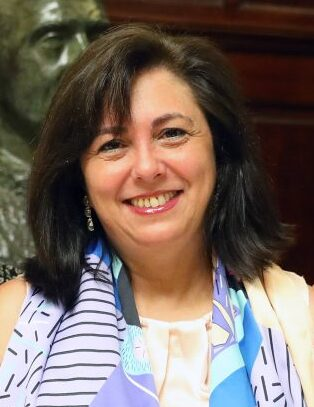
Rosa García in 2017

Rosa García García (Madrid, January 17, 1965), is a Spanish executive. She was CEO of Siemens Spain, president of German Chamber of Commerce in Spain, independent advisor for Acerinox. and Bankinter. Married with three children, she has spent most of her professional life in the United States.

== Professional career ==
After graduating with a degree in Mathematical Sciences from the Universidad Autónoma de Madrid, she developed her career in the Information Technology industry. She began as a technical support engineer at HSC in 1986, joining the NEC Group soon after as Director of Technical Support. Three years after, she was named Regional Director for WordPerfect in Spain.

In 1991, she joined Microsoft Ibérica as Director of Technical Support, subsequently moving to the company's headquarters in Richmond (EE.UU.)in 1996 to work as Director of Corporate Strategic Projects alongside CEO and President Steve Ballmer.

In 2000, she was appointed Corporate Managing Director of Sales and Marketing for Microsoft and, in May 2002, she returned to Spain to take up the highest post at Microsoft Ibérica as president of the company. In 2008 she was named vice president of Microsoft Western Europe. On 1 October 2011 she joined Siemens, replacing Francisco Belil as president and CEO in Spain.

She has been an advisor to Acerinox since 30 September 2013, and she also sat on the Banesto Board of Directors until it merged with Banco Santander in April 2013. In February 2015, she was elected independent director of Bankinter.

She is a regular contributor on leadership and innovation topics for different communication media.

== Awards and recognition ==
García is an advisor to the Spanish Society for the Advancement of Management (APD) and member of the Spanish Senior Management Forum. Among other accolades, she has received the “Best Female Executive Award” from the Spanish Federation of Female Directors Executives, Professionals and Entrepreneurs(FEDEPE), “Executive of the Year” from the Asociación Española de Directivos (AED) and “Female Executive of the Year” from the Spanish Association of Women Entrepreneurs(ASEME).

She was also honored as Executive of the Year by magazines specializing in the Information Technology sector, Computerworld and Computing, and has been awarded the “Alares National Award for Work, Life and Family Balance” ” in the Executive category.
