= Urbanor =

Urbanor is a Spanish society. It constructed the KIO Towers of the Plaza de Castilla, in Madrid. It became one of the major economic scandals of the 1980s in Spain.

== Case Urbanor ==
The "Case Urbanor" turned into an extraordinary judicial case. Plaintiffs architect Pedro Sentieri and builder Julio San Martín scored multimillion dollar returns when their investments multiplied by more than 27 times, in only nine months.

On the opposite side, defendants Alberto Cortina and Alberto Alcocer, known popularly as "The Albertos", had to pay 50 million Euros. The case lasted more than 10 years and was settled in the Supreme Court. Sentieri and San Martín continued to appeal the case.
