= Enric Duran =

Catalan anticapitalist activist

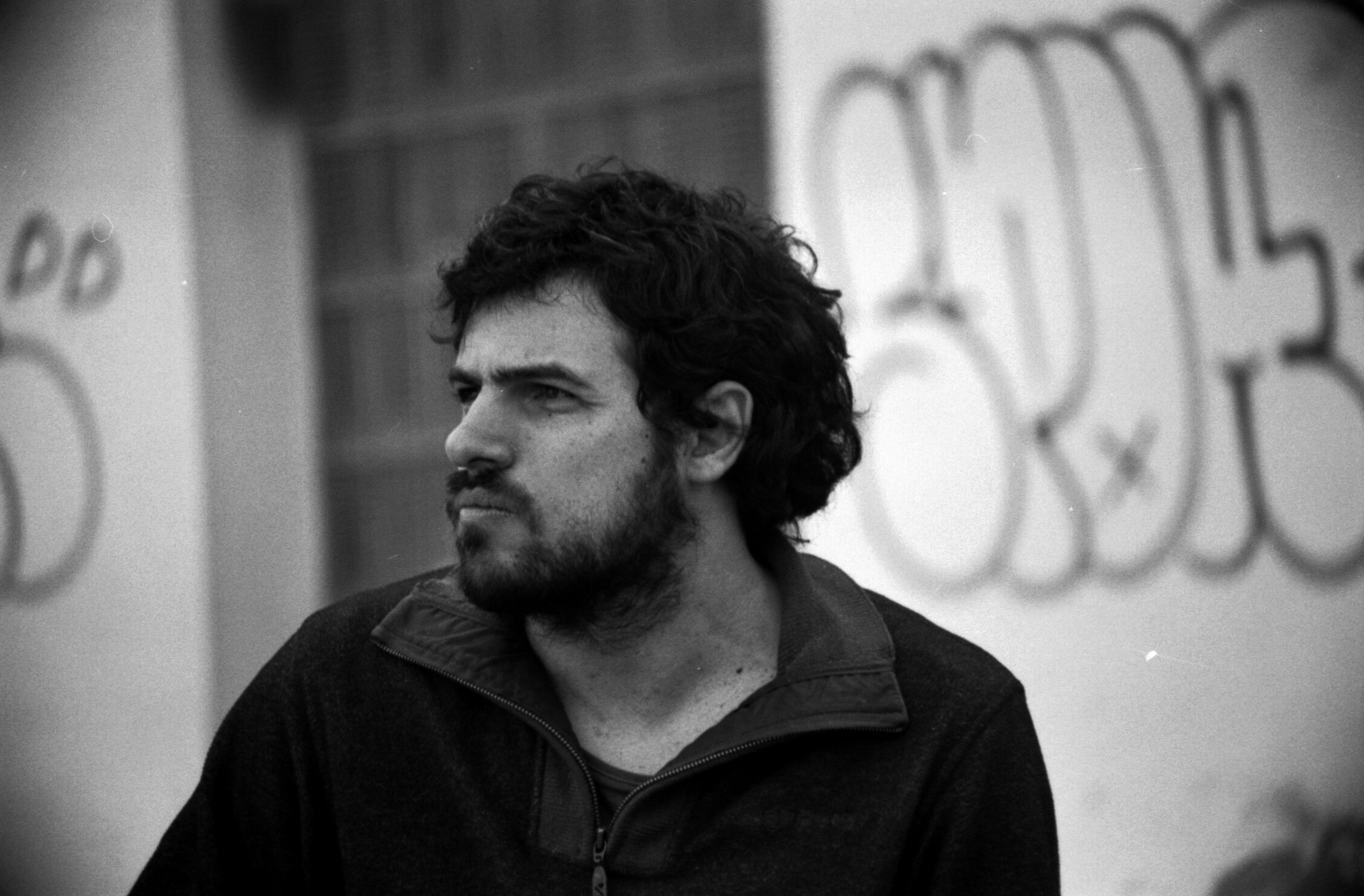
Enric Duran Giralt, anti-capitalist activist

Enric Duran Giralt (born 23 April 1976, Vilanova i la Geltrú) also known as Robin Banks or the Robin Hood of the Banks is a Spanish-Catalan anticapitalist activist and a founding member of the Catalan Integral Cooperative (CIC - Cooperativa Integral Catalana) and Faircoop.

On September 17, 2008, he publicly announced that he had 'robbed' dozens of Spanish banks of nearly half a million euros as part of a political action to denounce what he termed the predatory capitalist system.

From 2006 to 2008, Duran took out 68 commercial and personal loans from a total of 39 banks with no guarantees or property as collateral. He had no intention of repaying the debts, and used the money to finance various anti-capitalist movements. In 2008, Duran released both an online article entitled "I have "robbed" 492,000 euros from those who rob us the most, in order to denounce them and build alternatives for society" (translated), and an online video, each explaining what he had done and that he had left the country to view the reaction and consider his next move. This was also published in the free magazine Crisis, in Catalan, of which 200,000 copies were printed and distributed by volunteers throughout Catalonia. A second newspaper, We can! Live Without Capitalism was distributed on March 17, 2009, and a third, We want! on September 17, 2009.

== Stated reasons for actions ==
Duran stated that he sought to create a debate about the financial system and the current capitalist system, proliferate protest actions against it and fund the social movements that seek to create alternatives. Duran called what he did "an individual disobedience action", and stated that he was prepared to go to prison for his actions.

== Response of authorities ==
In 2009, Duran returned to Spain, and was arrested by Spanish police on March 17, 2009, at the University of Barcelona, as charges had been brought against him by six of the thirty-nine banks concerned. He spent two months in prison before being freed on a bail of 50,000 euros.

For the first anniversary of the announcement of his "robbery", an action day was planned in over 100 cities on September 17, 2009, in which people met, both in Spain and abroad, to share alternatives to capitalism.

In November 2011, a presentation was made to a civil judge requesting the annulment of his contract with Banco Bilbao Vizcaya Argentaria. On November 25, 2011, the state prosecutor requested that the judiciary pass down an 8-year prison sentence for Duran, for the crimes of presenting false documents (in securing his loans) and continued insolvency. The defence attorney based his case on the fact that imprisonment for unpaid debts has been abolished in Spain. Duran himself responded by maintaining that "I do not think that the judiciary is entitled to judge" (translated from Catalan). He questioned the state's lack of response to the financial speculators who inflicted great suffering on much of the European population, and to the September 2011 changes to the Spanish constitution which made the repayment of debts the absolute priority of the country. He also claimed that his actions were an act of social justice - an attempt to redress in some small way the injustices perpetrated by those in power.

Duran cited the pardon granted to the chief executive of the Banco Santander, Alfredo Sáenz Abad, in November 2011, as an example of the bias of the judiciary towards the powerful and well-connected, and argued that "when the government violates the rights of the people, insurrection is the most sacred of rights and the most indispensable of our duties" (translated from Catalan). He called on his supporters not to waste time campaigning for his acquittal or release, but rather to follow his acts of civil disobedience towards the banks with their own. In March 2012 he released a video explaining his legal situation and continued to encourage others to civil disobedience.

== Life in hiding ==
Before a criminal tribunal scheduled for 12 February 2013, Duran decided to leave the country rather than stand trial in Spain. "I don't see legitimacy in a judicial system based on authority, because I don't recognise its authority." The prosecuting attorney and 16 banking institutions called for an 8-year prison sentence.

Since this time he has been in hiding. A campaign under the hashtag #ReturnWithFreedom was started to enable Duran to return to Catalonia.

== Catalan Integral Cooperative ==
In April 2010, Duran began promoting the Catalan Integral Cooperative as a practical example of the ideals detailed in We can! Live Without Capitalism. In 2011 the cooperative accepted responsibility for a former industrial complex, with a view to turning it into a centre for environmental activities.

== FairCoop ==
In April 2014, Duran began to develop an idea that was to become Faircoop, an open global cooperative. It stated aims are to "contribute to a transition to a new world by reducing the economic and social inequalities among human beings as much as possible, and at the same time gradually contribute to a new global wealth, accessible to all humankind as commons".

== See also ==
- Anticapitalism
- Bank fraud
- Civil disobedience
- De-growth
- Lucio Urtubia
