= Alberto Alcocer =

Spanish businessman

Alberto Alcocer Torra (born December 17, 1942, in Madrid, Spain) is a Spanish businessman who, along with his cousin Alberto Cortina, owns Alcor Holding, a patrimonial society that owns 12.5% of Grupo ACS, the largest Spanish construction company, and 21% of the waste management company, Ence. As of March 2011, Forbes ranked him as the 13th richest person in Spain and the 993rd globally, with an estimated net worth of $1.2 billion.

== Biography ==
Alcocer's uncle, Pedro Cortina Mauri, was the foreign minister during the Francoist dictatorship, and his paternal grandfather, Alberto Alcocer y Ribacoba, was the Mayor of Madrid in the 1920s and again in the 1930s. In addition to Alberto Cortina, another cousin, Alfonso Cortina (d. 2020), was also a business executive.

Alcocer studied Law at the Universidad Complutense de Madrid. In 1969, he married Esther Koplowitz, and they kept their property separate. The cousins started working at the company Constructions and Contracts, founded by Koplowitz's father.

By 1976, Alcocer and Alberto Cortina were already managing directors and had transformed the company into a group of more than 30 societies. In 1978, they acquired 5% of the Development Bank, which belonged to the Central Bank. Three years later, the cousins acquired some shares in the cement company Portland Valderrivas, which was owned by Banesto.

In 1982, they acquired the Bank Zaragozano, and in 1987, they entered the mass media industry with the group Estructura. One year later, they created the society Cartera Central, together with the Group KIO, to which they sold the majority of control of the society Urbanor in exchange for 12% that the Kuwaiti group had in the Central Bank. This operation caused a spectacular revaluation of Urbanor's stocks. However, in 2003, they had to sell their participation in the control of the Bank Zaragozano to Barclays because one of their associates in Urbanor, the architect Pedro Sentieri, accused them of racketeering, leading to the case Urbanor.

The judgment was appealed for violating the judicial effective guardianship of Cortina and Alcocer, and in June, the Supreme Court granted them the right to recover 50 million Euros paid to their ex-associates as compensation.

A few weeks after the absolution of the Urbanor case, Forbes included Alcocer among the 1000 wealthiest people in the world.
