= Valley of Shadows (2024 film) =

- Theatrical release poster
- Spanish: Valley of Shadows
- Directed by: Salvador Calvo
- Screenplay by: Alejandro Hernández
- Produced by: Javier Ugarte; Jaime Ortiz de Artiñano
- Starring: Miguel Herrán; Susana Abaitua; Iván Renedo; Alexandra Masangkay; Stanzin Gombo; Morup Namgyal
- Cinematography: Álex Catalán
- Edited by: Jaime Colis
- Music by: Roque Baños
- Production companies: La Terraza Films; Atresmedia Cine; Ikiru Films; El Reino de Zanskar AIE
- Distributed by: Buena Vista International
- Release date: 12 January 2024
- Country: Spain
- Language: Spanish

Valley of Shadows (Spanish: Valle de sombras) is a 2024 Spanish survival thriller film directed by Salvador Calvo from a screenplay by Alejandro Hernández which stars Miguel Herrán, alongside Susana Abaitua, Iván Renedo, and Alexandra Masangkay.

== Plot ==
The plot is set in the Himalayas of Himachal Pradesh in 1999. The plot follows Quique, rescued by a local after he, Clara, and Lucas are assaulted by bandits during their holidays in this region of India.

== Cast ==
- Miguel Herrán as Quique
- Susana Abaitua as Clara
- Iván Renedo as Lucas
- Alexandra Masangkay
- Stanzin Gombo
- Morup Namgyal

== Production ==
The screenplay was penned by Alejandro Hernández. The film is a La Terraza Films, Atresmedia Cine, Ikiru Films, and El Reino de Zanskar AIE production. It was lensed by Álex Catalán. Shooting locations included the Kullu Valley.

== Release ==
Distributed by Buena Vista International, the film was released theatrically in Spain on 12 January 2024.

== Accolades ==
Year	Award	Category	Nominee(s)	Result	Ref.
2024	38th Goya Awards	Best Production Supervision	Leire Aurrekoetxea, Luis Gutiérrez	Nominated	
2024	38th Goya Awards	Best Makeup and Hairstyles	Sarai Rodríguez, Noé Montes, Óscar del Monte	Nominated	
2024	38th Goya Awards	Best Special Effects	Raúl Romanillos, Míriam Piquer	Nominated	

== See also ==
- List of Spanish films of 2024
