= Elena Cué =

Spanish businesswoman, art expert and writer (born 1972)

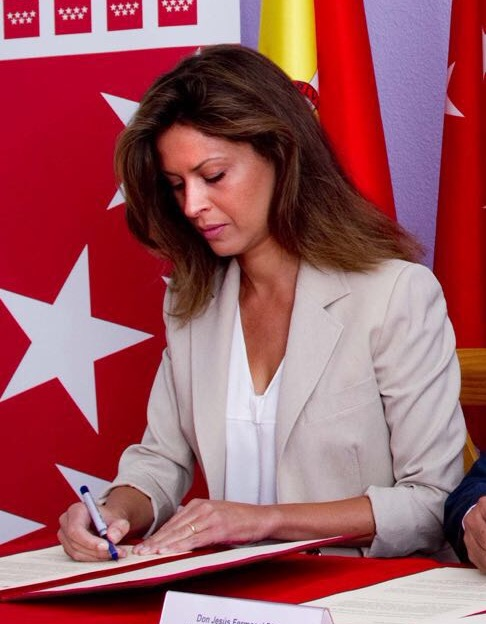
- Cué in 2013
- Born: 1972 (age 53–54)
- Occupation: Art writer
- Spouse: Alberto Cortina (m. 2000)
- Children: 1
- Website: alejandradeargos.com/index.php/en

Elena Cué (Madrid,1972) is a Spanish businesswoman, art expert and writer. She graduated in Philosophy and Gemology, publishes articles, and interviews world-renowned artists for the Spanish newspaper ABC, as well as for the US version of the Huffington Post.

Cué is the president of the Alberto and Elena Cortina Foundation, dedicated to social works. She manages the foundation together with her husband, the businessman Alberto Cortina. In October 1997, she won the Spanish shooting championship. In that same year, she finished as runner-up in the European championship.

== Relationship with art ==
Cué founded the website Alejandra de Argos, where she writes articles about art and influential interviews and world-renowned artists such as Jeff Koons, the Colombian Fernando Botero or her friend Cai Guo-Qiang, as well as Nobel Prize in Literature laureate, Mario Vargas Llosa. In addition to the articles on her website, Cué writes for the Spanish newspaper ABC and at the US edition of the Huffington Post. In November 2015, Cué joined the patronage for the Museo Reina Sofía foundation and in June 2016 she joined the patronage of the ABC Museum of Madrid. Cué is a member of Vivre en couleur of the Fondation Cartier pour l'Art Contemporain.

=== Notable interviewees ===
- October 2014, Cai Guo-Qiang.
- November 2014, Yue Minjun.
- November 2014, Maurizio Cattelan.
- December 2014, Guillermo Kuitca.
- January 2015, Miquel Barceló.
- February 2015, Fernando Botero.
- March 2015, Yan Pei-Ming.
- April 2015, Thomas Struth.
- May 2015, Jean Nouvel.
- June 2015, Joana Vasconcelos.
- June 2015, Martín Chirino.
- June 2015, Bernard Kouchner.
- October 2015, Jason deCaires Taylor.
- November 2015, Tatiana Trouvé.
- December 2015, Hiroshi Sugimoto.
- December 2015, Eduardo Arroyo.
- January 2016, Candida Höfer.
- March 2016, Mario Vargas Llosa.
- June 2016, Jeff Koons.
- March 2019, Bernard-Henri Lévy.
- June 2019, Jack Ma.
- December 2019, Al Gore.

== Charitable foundation ==
In 2011, Elena Cué and Alberto Cortina created the Alberto and Elena Cortina Foundation with the stated purpose to promote, create, develop and aid individuals and projects with all kinds of charity and education aims, and with a special focus on children. The foundation started with various projects in parallel. In 2011 it helped the victims of the 2010 Haiti earthquake by distributing food aid during that year and by reconstructing homes and other infrastructures. The foundation also provides help to woman at risk of Social exclusion, free housing and a soup kitchen. In 2012, the foundation started the invisible kitchen service, through it food and other basic supplies are distributed to families in need at their own homes. Another project promoted Cué's foundation is the "Econosolidario", the only grocery store in Spain where the families designated by social services can use a card that holds points to "buy" the basic products they need.

== Personal life ==
In 1997, Elena Cué started a relationship with the businessman Alberto Cortina. They were married in 2000 at Cortina's estate "Las Cuevas". In 2006, their daughter Alejandra Cortina Cué was born.
