= Mario Conde =

Spanish businessman, banker, state lawyer and politician (born 1948)

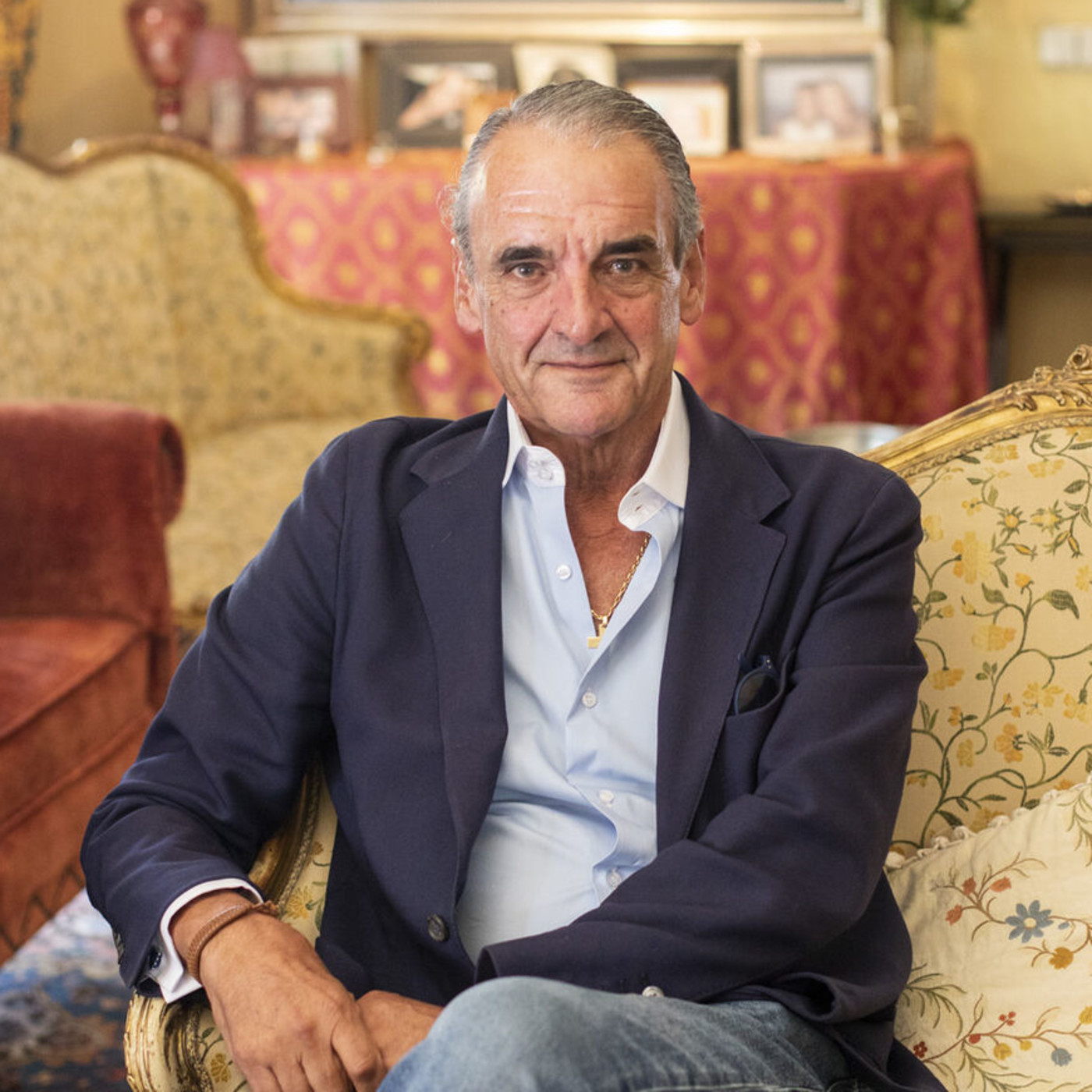
- Conde in 2024

Chairman of Banesto
- In office 16 December 1987 – 28 December 1993

President of Civil Society and Democracy
- In office 6 October 2012 – 21 May 2013

Personal details
- Born: 14 September 1948 (age 77) Tui, Spain
- Party: CDS; SCD
- Spouses: María Lourdes Arroyo Botana (m. 1973–2007) María Pérez-Ugena Corominas (m. 2010–2016)
- Children: 2
- Education: Universidad de Deusto
- Occupation: Businessman; banker; politician; state lawyer; television host

Mario Antonio Conde (Spanish: [ˈmaɾjo ˈkonde]; born 14 September 1948) is a Spanish businessman, former banker, state lawyer and politician. He served as chairman of Banesto from November 1987 to December 1993, when he was dismissed and the firm intervened by the Bank of Spain, in what would become the first major interference of a government in a financial institution. At the peak of his career in 1987, a 38-year-old Conde controlled over 1% of Spain's GDP.

Son of a customs inspector, he was noted for his studying and hard-working capabilities, which led him to obtain the highest distinction of his year's Law promotion at the University of Deusto. Conde's career came to the spotlight when, age 24, he became the youngest State Lawyer in the history of Spain, achieving also the highest grade ever attained in the corps. He remarkably earned the title in little more than a year, when the average candidate took 5.

After working for two years in the Ministry of Finance, Conde met Juan Abelló who, convinced of his talent, offered him a place as board member at his family's laboratory. Following the sale of the laboratories to Merck Sharp & Dohme in 1984, they gained control of Antibióticos S.A., an important antibiotics firm. In March 1987, Conde and Abelló took part in what became the most ambitious transaction in the history of private business in Spain at the time, the sale of 100% of the shares of Antibióticos S.A. to Montedison for US$450 million (approximately US$1 billion today).

The exceptionally wealthy Conde and his partner Abelló, who had amassed a fortune following the deal with Montedison, bought a significant amount of shares of Banesto, one of the largest and most traditional banks in Spain, to become members of the management board. Conde was eventually appointed executive chairman on 30 November 1987, becoming the youngest financial chairman of the moment. As a result of six years of an allegedly corrupt management of the bank and excessive credit-lending, there was a patrimonial hole in Banesto tentatively estimated at €3.6 billion (equivalent to roughly US$7.2 billion today) on 28 December 1993. Luis Carlos Croissier, the President of the Comisión Nacional del Mercado de Valores, the financial regulator of the national securities markets, decided to impose a trading halt on Banesto, and Luis Ángel Rojo, the Governor of the Bank of Spain, communicated the intervention of the banking entity, tasking Alfredo Sáenz Abad with chairing the board of directors of Banesto in a temporary basis. Conde, who stayed in preventive detention from December 1994 to January 1995, faced a trail of judicial problems. He was sentenced to 10 years in prison in March 2000 by the Audiencia Nacional (raised to 20 years in 2002 by the Supreme Court). He in fact served 11 years before being paroled.

Mario Conde was seen for many years as the ultimate societal role-model. His embodiment of the self-made man was admired by many, dubbing him "the real life Great Gatsby" but also "Spain's Machiavelli".

== Biography ==
He was born on 14 September 1948 in Tui, in the province of Pontevedra. He earned a Licentiate degree in Law at the University of Deusto, getting the best academic record of his promotion, full of Honours as well as he also obtained the Extraordinary Prize of Degree.

He joined the State Lawyers Corps in 1973, 1st in his promotion. First destined in Toledo, and later at the Ministry of Finance in Madrid, he left the public administration on voluntary leave in 1976, starting then a career in the private sector.

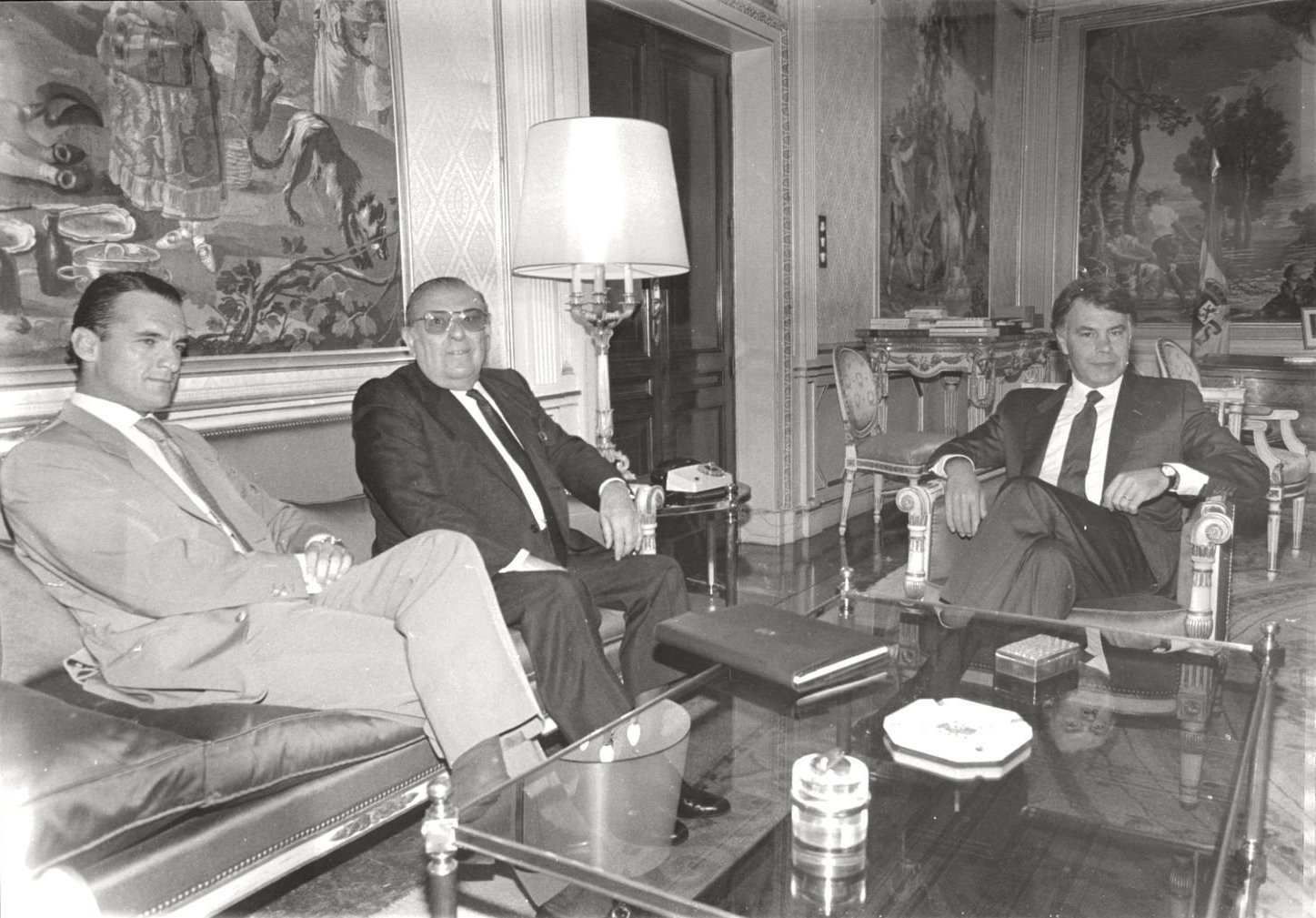
Conde (left) and Alfonso Escámez (centre) during a reception given by Prime Minister Felipe González (right) concerning the Banesto-Banco Central merger, 1988

Full of ambition, Conde has been described as the incarnation of the paradigm of yuppie in the 1980s in Spain, became a major shareholder of the Banco Espaňol de Crédito (Banesto) in October 1987, and, soon after, on 30 November, he was appointed as the Chairman of Banesto, serving from 16 December 1987 to 29 December 1993. His successful business career as well as exemplary public image ended when Banesto was declared in bankruptcy.

With a patrimonial hole in Banesto tentatively estimated at 450,000,000,000 pesetas (roughly €2,704,000,000), on 28 December 1993, Luis Carlos Croissier, the President of the Comisión Nacional del Mercado de Valores the financial regulator of the national securities markets, decided to impose a trading halt on Banesto, and Luis Ángel Rojo, the Governor of the Bank of Spain, communicated the intervention of the banking entity, tasking Alfredo Sáenz Abad with chairing the board of directors of Banesto in a temporary basis. Conde, who stayed in preventive detention from December 1994 to January 1995, faced a trail of judicial problems. He paid a visit to prison (February 1998 – August 99) fulfilling part of the 4-year and a half sentence that the justice delivered vis-à-vis the "Argentia Trust" case. Regarding the "Banesto" case, he was sentenced to 10 years in prison in March 2000 by the Audiencia Nacional (raised to 20 years in 2002 by the Supreme Court). He in fact served 11 years before being paroled.

In 1998, he affiliated to the Democratic and Social Centre (CDS), and, postulated as prime ministerial candidate by the party, ran as candidate to the Congress of Deputies, 1st in the UCD list for Madrid vis-à-vis the 2000 general election. CDS failed to obtain parliamentary representation.

A collaborator in Intereconomía, the media group further to the right in the mainstream Spanish scene, chiefly as panelist in El gato al agua, he became the conductor of a short-lived late-night show called Una hora con Mario ("One hour with Mario") in June 2011.

He was promoter of the political party Sociedad Civil y Democracia (SCD), registered in 2011. He was elected president of SCD in its constituent assembly, celebrated on 6 October 2012. He contested the 21 October 2012 Galician regional election, running 1st in the SCD list in Pontevedra. The party's political platform was focused on attacking the "autonomic state", which SCD described as "inefficient". Regarding the November 2012 Catalan regional election, SCD did not contest at the ballots, but Conde endorsed and called to vote for Citizens. Conde left the post of party leader on 21 May 2013, and months later, in September 2013, María Jamardo assumed as new President. By February 2014, when Jamardo left the SCD's leadership, the party was reportedly at the verge of dissolution, amid heavy competition from other political parties, with—according to the SCD's director of communication—plenty of members ready to jump to the newly created Vox.

In April 2016 he was rearrested, along with several family members and put into remand due to an apparently fraudulent transfer of capital. A cosmetics company he owns was implicated in the fraud, which combined a failure to pay some workers with the large quantities of money found offshore.

== Writer ==
After his exploits with Banesto he founded the magazine MC and has also published several books in Spanish about his experience of power, his life as a prisoner and his prison experience, Taoism and various religious beliefs as well as his most demanded work, "The System", a long book that details his personal experiences with the supposedly unofficial powers that rule the country from the shadows, those being bankers, politicians, media moguls, and so on. According to Xavier Casals, Conde set the foundations of a "protestatary" brand of populism directed against the economic and political elites.

== Honours ==
- (Spain) Complutense University of Madrid: Doctor Honoris Causa (1993-2016)

== Bibliography ==
- Asalto al poder by Jesús Cacho. Where explains how the criminal conspiracy between Abelló and Conde corrupted one of the most important banks in Spain (which subsequently rescued by Santander Bank).
- Duelo of titanes. Jesús Cacho. On the failed fusion of Banesto with the Central Bank.
- M.C. | Jesús Cacho. On the intervention of Banesto.
- Conde, el ángel caído (the fallen angel) by Luis Herrero.

== See also ==
- Economy of Spain

Business positions
Preceded by Pablo Garnica Mansi	Chairman of Banesto; 1987–1993	Succeeded by Alfredo Sáenz Abad
Party political offices
Preceded by Office created	President of Civil Society and Democracy; 2012–2013	Succeeded by María Jamardo
