= Alexandra Masangkay =

Spanish singer and actress (born 1992)

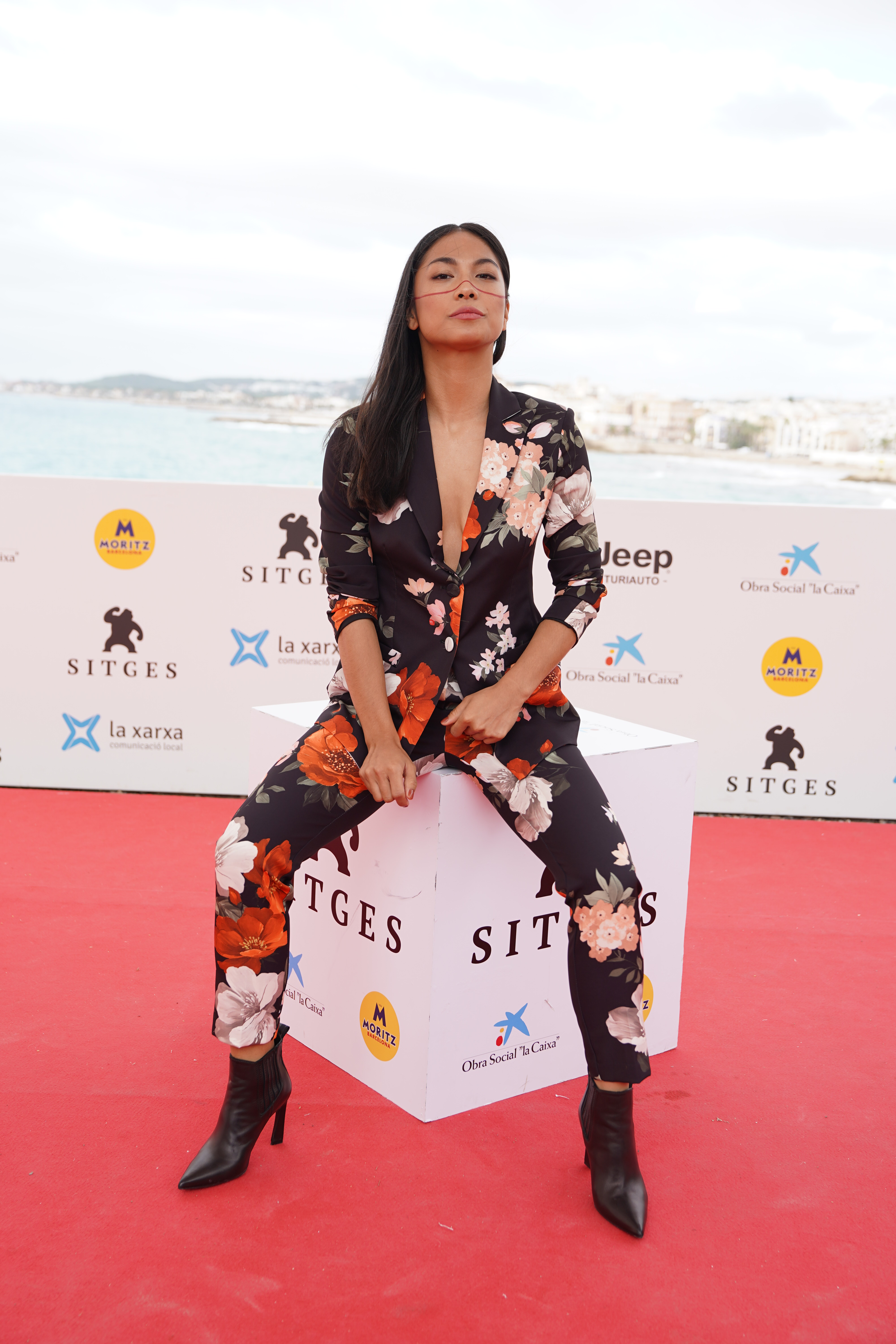
- Masangkay in 2019
- Born: 1992 or 1993 (age 33–34); Barcelona, Catalonia, Spain
- Occupations: Actress; dancer; singer

Alexandra Masangkay (born 1992 or 1993) is a Spanish singer, dancer and actress. She earned early visibility to a television audience in Spain for her participation in Operación Triunfo 8 in 2011.

== Biography ==
Masangkay was born in Barcelona to Filipino immigrant parents. In 2011, she took part in season 8 of a reality musical talent show, Operación Triunfo, ranking fourth in the final standings.

She landed her debut as a television actress in the 2014 musical series Dreamland, which was followed by credits in B&b, de boca en boca, Yo quisiera and Más de 100 mentiras. Masangkay's film debut came with her performance as Teresa in the historical drama 1898, Our Last Men in the Philippines (2016). As a musical theatre actress she has played Nala in The Lion King at Teatro Lope de Vega and Kiki in Flashdance. In 2019, she featured in the dystopian film The Platform, portraying Miharu, a sadistic prisoner desperately searching for her offspring. In 2022, she played Wendy, a Philippine migrant domestic worker in La Moraleja, in the spy thriller Code Name: Emperor. In 2023, she wrapped shooting Valley of Shadows.

== Filmography ==
Year	Title	Role	Notes	Ref.
2016	1898, los últimos de Filipinas (1898, Our Last Men in the Philippines)	Teresa		
2018	Más de 100 mentiras	Irene	Miniseries	
2019	El hoyo (The Platform)	Miharu		
2022	Código Emperador (Code Name: Emperor)	Wendy		
2023	Valeria	Nuria	5 episodes (season 3)	
2024	Valle de sombras (Valley of Shadows)	Prana		
2024	Stags	Luba	Miniseries	
2025	The Walking Dead: Daryl Dixon	Paz	Main role; 6 episodes	
2025	Sandokan	Olla	Miniseries	
