= Alberto and Elena Cortina Foundation =

Spanish nonprofit organization

- Founded: 11 July 2011
- Founder: Alberto Cortina and Elena Cué
- Purpose: Humanitarian aid, International development and social service
- Location: Madrid, Spain
- Region served: Haiti, Spain
- Owner: Alberto Cortina and Elena Cue
- Website: www.fundacionalbertoyelenacortina.com

Alberto and Elena Cortina Foundation ("Fundación Alberto y Elena Cortina" in Spanish) is a nonprofit organization, of Spanish nationality, founded by Alberto Cortina and his wife Elena Cué, on July 8, 2011.

The foundation goal is to promote, create, develop and aid individuals and projects with all kinds of charity and education aims, and with a special focus on children. The funds used by the Foundation for the development, management and maintenance of projects come exclusively from contributions from the two founding partners, Mr. Alberto Cortina and Mrs. Elena Cue Cortina.

== Projects ==
=== Haiti ===
In Haiti, the foundation provided assistance to families affected by the earthquake of 2010, in the refugee camp of Tabarre ( in the outskirts of Puerto Príncipe), The foundation helped more than 1200 people, 400 of whom were children.

The Foundation helped by purchasing and distributing food in cooperation with "Mensajeros de la Paz", in child specific nutrition programs, in school support, and in the installation of basic sanitary-higienic facilities.

=== Spain ===
In Spain the Foundation focuses its efforts on the development of programs to lighten the precarious situation facing so many Spanish families due to the crisis, and in this area, the Foundation carries out the following projects:

- LA CASA DE LA PAZ ("PEACE HOME")- is a health care project aimed at children from different countries, affected by serious diseases that have no possibility of treatment in their home countries.
- HOGAR DE ACOGIDA ("HOME FOR THE SICK")- which works to improve the lives of sick people in Spain without resources, usually affected by rare diseases. They are referred to hospitals, offering médical, psychological aid financed through the Foundation.
- COMEDORES SOCIALES ("COMMUNITY KITCHEN")- located in Madrid, where they offer meals prepared and served a significant number of people in need. Fridays they donate food packs for each family, enough to last for the weekend.
- COMEDOR INVISIBLE ("INVISIBLE KITCHEN")- is a project for the "shameful poor", this are people not used to asking for help, and are ashamed of their poverty. The Foundation aims to help these people that suffer in silence the consequences of the economic crisis by establishing a grocery bag delivery program, without stigmatizing the recipient of the aid.
- MUJERES EN RIESGO DE EXCLUSIÓN SOCIAL ("WOMEN AT RISK OF SOCIAL EXCLUSION")- The Foundation began a program to help women at risk of social exclusion. Through and agreement with Spain's Immigration Head Office, it set up a protocol to help single women, evicted from their homes, in some cases with their children.

The program offers them, free housing, education and counseling. In 2013 Community of Madrid signs a cooperation agreement with Alberto and Elena Cortina Foundation by which they refer women at risk of social exclusion to the foundation's main care Facility.
