= The Walking Dead: Daryl Dixon =

American post-apocalyptic drama television series

- Season 1 intertitle
- Also known as: The Walking Dead: Daryl Dixon – The Book of Carol (season 2)
- Genre: Horror; Drama; Zombie apocalypse
- Created by: David Zabel
- Based on: The Walking Dead by: Robert Kirkman; Tony Moore; Charlie Adlard
- Showrunner: David Zabel
- Starring: Norman Reedus; Clémence Poésy; Louis Puech Scigliuzzi; Laïka Blanc-Francard; Anne Charrier; Romain Levi; Adam Nagaitis; Melissa McBride; Joel de la Fuente; Eduardo Noriega; Óscar Jaenada; Alexandra Masangkay; Hugo Arbués; Candela Saitta
- Composer: David Sardy
- Country of origin: United States
- Original languages: English; French; Spanish
- No. of seasons: 3
- No. of episodes: 19

Production
- Executive producers: Scott M. Gimple; Robert Kirkman; David Alpert; Gale Anne Hurd; Angela Kang; Brian Bockrath; Jason Richman; Daniel Percival; Greg Nicotero; Norman Reedus; David Zabel; Steven Squillante; Melissa McBride
- Production locations: France; Spain
- Camera setup: Single-camera
- Running time: 48–61 minutes
- Production companies: Idiot Box Productions; Skybound Entertainment; Valhalla Entertainment; Circle of Confusion; Remainder Men; AMC Studios

Original release
- Network: AMC
- Release: September 10, 2023 – present

Related
- The Walking Dead

The Walking Dead: Daryl Dixon, or simply Daryl Dixon, is an American post-apocalyptic horror drama television series created by David Zabel for AMC, based on The Walking Dead character of the same name. It is the fifth spin-off and overall sixth television series in The Walking Dead franchise, sharing continuity with the other series and set after the conclusion of the original The Walking Dead television series.

Norman Reedus reprises his role as Daryl Dixon from the original The Walking Dead series. Reedus stars alongside Clémence Poésy, Louis Puech Scigliuzzi, Laïka Blanc-Francard, Anne Charrier, Romain Levi, Adam Nagaitis, Joel de la Fuente, Eduardo Noriega, Óscar Jaenada, Alexandra Masangkay, Hugo Arbués, and Candela Saitta, all of whom portray new characters, in addition to Melissa McBride, who reprises her role as Carol Peletier from The Walking Dead.

Development of the series began in September 2020, and its title was announced in October 2022. Filming began that month, on location in the series' initial setting of Paris, France, with additional casting taking place starting in November. The series moved production to Spain beginning with its third season, and filming began in August 2024 in Madrid. The series was originally planned to co-star the character Carol Peletier under the possible title The Walking Dead: Daryl & Carol, but Carol was subsequently written out of the bulk of the first season due to logistical issues involving the casting of McBride, before she joined the series in a main capacity beginning with the second season.

The first season premiered on September 10, 2023, and consists of six episodes. In July 2023, the series was renewed for a second season, which premiered on September 29, 2024. Titled The Walking Dead: Daryl Dixon – The Book of Carol, the second season features McBride as a series regular in a return to the show's original concept. In July 2024, the series was renewed for a third season, which premiered on September 7, 2025. In July 2025, the series was renewed for a fourth and final season, which is set to premiere in February 2027.

== Premise ==
Daryl Dixon washes ashore in France (the origin of the walker virus) and struggles to piece together how he got there and why. The series tracks his journey across a broken but resilient France as he hopes to find a way back home. As he makes the journey, though, the connections he forms along the way complicate his ultimate plan.

== Cast and characters ==
=== Main ===
- Norman Reedus as Daryl Dixon: A skilled hunter and former recruiter for the Alexandria Safe-Zone who was once a part of Rick Grimes' group on The Walking Dead. After departing the Commonwealth, he is captured and taken across the Atlantic Ocean before arriving on the coast of France.
- Clémence Poésy as Isabelle Carriere (seasons 1–2): A headstrong nun and member of a progressive religious group who encounters Daryl.
- Louis Puech Scigliuzzi as Laurent Carriere (seasons 1–2): A highly intelligent young boy who is viewed by a religious group as the future messiah destined to lead humanity to a renewal. It's later revealed that he is Lily and Quinn's son as well as Isabelle's nephew.
- Laïka Blanc-Francard as Sylvie (seasons 1–2): A soft-spoken nun and friend of Isabelle. Flashbacks reveal that Sylvie was a student at an abbey when the apocalypse began, and she was raised by the nuns after her parents had died in the initial outbreak.
- Anne Charrier as Marion Genet (seasons 1–2): The leader of Pouvoir des Vivants (Power of the Living), a paramilitary group of survivors in France.
- Romain Levi as Stéphane Codron (seasons 1–2; guest season 3–present): A high-ranking guerrier (warrior) for Pouvoir who develops a personal grudge against Daryl.
- Adam Nagaitis as Quinn (season 1): The British owner of an underground nightclub in Paris called the "Demimonde" who has become a powerful figure during the apocalypse. He is also Laurent's biological father.
- Melissa McBride as Carol Peletier (season 2–present; guest season 1): A hardened survivor and former member of Rick Grimes' group on The Walking Dead who begins searching for Daryl after losing contact with him.
- Joel de la Fuente as Losang (season 2; guest season 1): The American leader of Union de L'Espoir (Union of Hope), a resistance network working against Pouvoir from their main settlement at Mont-Saint-Michel.
- Eduardo Noriega as Antonio (season 3–present): A kind and welcoming resident of Solaz del Mar (Solace of the Sea), a thriving community of survivors in northern Spain.
- Óscar Jaenada as Federico "Fede" de Rivera (season 3–present): The leader of Solaz del Mar.
- Alexandra Masangkay as Paz (season 3–present): A gitana cowboy who acts as the head of security for Solaz.
- Hugo Arbués as Roberto (season 3–present): Antonio's son who wishes to leave Solaz with Justina to preserve their relationship.
- Candela Saitta as Justina de Rivera (season 3–present): Federico's niece and Roberto's girlfriend, who is one of several young women from Solaz subject to an annual ofrenda (offering) to El Alcázar (The Fortress) in exchange for supplies.

=== Recurring ===
- François Delaive as Dr. Lafleur (seasons 1–2): The head researcher for Pouvoir who experiments on walkers, leading to the creation of dangerous variants.
- Eriq Ebouaney as Fallou Boukar (seasons 1–2): The leader of a small rooftop community in Paris that is part of the Union.
- Lukerya Ilyashenko as Anna Valery (season 1; guest season 2): A Russian singer at the Demimonde and Quinn's girlfriend.
- Tristan Zanchi as Emile Thibault (season 1; guest season 2): A young member of Fallou's community who befriends Sylvie.
- Manish Dayal as Ash Patel (season 2): An airplane pilot in the U.S. who befriends Carol during her search for Daryl.
- Nassima Benchicou as Jacinta (season 2): The fanatical second-in-command of the Union who is loyal to Losang.
- Tatiana Gousseff as Sabine (season 2): The second-in-command of Pouvoir.
- Greta Fernández as Elena (season 3–present): Paz's ex-girlfriend, who was taken from Barcelona by El Alcázar and married Guillermo.
- Yassmine Othman as Marga (season 3–present): Federico's elderly mother and a healer.
- Pedro Bachura as Gustavo (season 3–present): A resident of Solaz who stands guard at the main gates.
- Armando Buika as Sergio (season 3–present): The deputy leader of Solaz.
- Gonzalo Bouza as Guillermo Torres (season 3): The leader of El Alcázar who claims to be a descendant of the Spanish monarchy.
- Hada Nieto as Alba Guerrero (season 3–present): A young woman who takes part in Solaz's annual ofrenda.
- Cuco Usín as Manuel (season 3): A soldier working for El Alcázar.
- Irina Björklund as Valentina (season 3–present): An experienced boat captain who lives in an old lighthouse.

=== Guest ===
- Catherine Arditi as Véronique (season 1): The Mother Superior at an abbey in southern France affiliated with the Union.
- Faustine Koziel as Lily Carriere (season 1): Isabelle's pregnant sister who appears in flashbacks set during the early days of the apocalypse.
- Kim Higelin as Lou (season 1): The de-facto leader of a group of children who live in an abandoned preschool.
- Dominique Pinon as Antoine (season 1): A member of Fallou's community who cares for a flock of messenger pigeons.
- Paloma as Coco (seasons 1–2): An entertainer at Demimonde.
- Stephen Merchant as Julian Chamberlain (season 3): A survivor living in London who believes himself to be the last Englishman in England.
- Vicente Romero as Chofo (season 3): The leader of the Buzzards, a group of nomadic bandits who travel by walker-powered train.
- Nansi Nsue as Amaia (season 3): The leader of the Limbos, a community of leprosy-afflicted survivors who have been starved of water.
- Paula Rios as Blanca (season 3): Chofo's lover and member of the Buzzards.
- Luis Bondia as Mateo (season 3): A friendly survivor who introduces Daryl to the Limbos.
- Amin Hamada as Khalid (season 3): Paz's friend and a member of Laia's community.
- Raquel Ferri as Laia (season 3): The leader of a community of refugees in Barcelona that consists of young women who have fled or been rescued from El Alcázar's ofrenda.
- Ravina Raventós as Catrina (season 3): A member of Laia's community who wields a crossbow.
- Melina Matthews (season 4)
- Jimmy Smits as Captain Alejandro Perkins (season 4)

== Episodes ==
| Season | Episodes | Originally released | |
| Season | Episodes | First released | Last released |
|---|---|---|---|
| 1 | 6 | September 10, 2023 | October 15, 2023 |
| 2 | 6 | September 29, 2024 | November 3, 2024 |
| 3 | 7 | September 7, 2025 | October 19, 2025 |
| 4 | 8 | February 2027 | TBA |

=== Season 1 (2023) ===
| No. overall | No. in season | Title | Directed by | Written by | Original release date | U.S. viewers (millions) |
|---|---|---|---|---|---|---|
| 1 | 1 | "L'âme Perdue" (French for "The Lost Soul") | Daniel Percival | David Zabel | September 10, 2023 | 0.631 |
Daryl Dixon washes ashore in France and decides to return to America. He suffers an arm wound upon encountering "burners", a new walker variant. Near Marseille, Daryl encounters Maribelle and her grandfather Guillaume. Henri and Michel, soldiers from a paramilitary group called Pouvoir des Vivants, (Note: French for "Power of the Living".) attack them and are killed before Maribelle and Guillaume rob Daryl and flee. The pair are caught by Michel's brother Codron, who kills Guillaume and seeks revenge on Daryl on the assumption that he killed Michel. Isabelle, a nun for the Union de L'Espoir, (Note: French for "Union of Hope".) finds Daryl and takes him to her abbey for treatment. She introduces Daryl to Laurent, a young boy the Union believes is the Messiah destined to revive humanity; she believes that Daryl is the messenger who must deliver Laurent to the Union contingent in Paris. He rejects the idea and leaves. Codron's men attack the abbey, killing most of the nuns. Daryl returns and helps to fend off the assailants. He agrees to help in exchange for Isabelle leading him to Le Havre. Flashbacks reveal that Isabelle was a high-end pickpocket and drug addict when the epidemic started, and a Pouvoir ship transporting walker test subjects took Daryl from America, but he instigated a mutiny, destroyed their research and escaped. Genet, the leader of Pouvoir, orders that Daryl be found.
| 2 | 2 | "Alouette" (French for "Lark") | Daniel Percival | Jason Richman & David Zabel | September 17, 2023 | 0.564 |
During the initial outbreak, Isabelle, a drug addict and thief, escapes from Paris with her boyfriend Quinn and her pregnant sister Lily; she ultimately abandons Quinn. Lily dies and gives birth as a walker to Laurent via emergency C-section. In the present, the group loses their mule and are captured by a group of children living in their old preschool with their dying teacher, Madame Dubois. Laurent makes friends with the children, who tell him the nuns are lying to him. Needing a horse, Daryl offers to get medicine for Dubois if one of the children, Lou, helps him raid a nearby castle owned by a man dubbed La Tarasque. Inside, Daryl confronts the man, revealed as an American from Texas named R.J. Gaines, and rescues a boy he has captured. Gaines falls into his own walker moat and is devoured, while the kids rescue Daryl. Meanwhile, Dubois has died, and Daryl encourages Lou to step up as their leader. Daryl's party leaves, but Laurent expresses frustration over secrets kept from him. Codron returns to the abbey where he finds Daryl's recorded message, a picture of Laurent and a map of the group's route to Paris.
| 3 | 3 | "Paris Sera Toujours Paris" (French for "Paris Will Always Be Paris") | Tim Southam | Coline Abert | September 24, 2023 | 0.649 |
After a brief stop in Angers, including a bizarre zombie orchestra performing Boléro, Daryl's group finally reaches Paris. There, after a poignant encounter with a little girl – now a zombie – who used to be Isabelle's neighbor, they meet a community led by a man named Fallou. With their help, Daryl seeks out information on a ship that can return him to America, which leads the group to the Demimonde nightclub and a reunion with Isabelle's ex-boyfriend Quinn. Quinn reveals that he is Laurent's father and demands that Isabelle and Laurent stay with him in exchange for his help. Daryl rejects the deal and prepares to set out on his own after an argument with Isabelle, leading to Laurent running away after overhearing them. Codron meets with Genet, who agrees to let him lead the search for Daryl while her people continue experimenting with walkers. Pouvoir attacks Fallou's community and Isabelle searches for Laurent, while Daryl falls through a roof following a brutal fight with Codron.
| 4 | 4 | "La Dame de Fer" (French for "The Lady of Iron") | Tim Southam | Shannon Goss | October 1, 2023 | 0.719 |
Genet begins a search for Laurent, seeking to eliminate him as he is a symbol of hope to people. As part of this, Genet makes a deal with Quinn, who seeks Laurent to get Isabelle back. After escaping from a flooded building, and having a dream that a praying Laurent is ignored by a mob of walkers, Daryl encounters Antoine who is killed by guerriers, (Note: French for "Warrior".) but he helps the dying man to free his pigeons. Reuniting with Isabelle, Daryl tracks Laurent to the Eiffel Tower's ruins, where the boy nearly falls victim to a herd. During the rescue, Laurent is kidnapped by Quinn's men and taken to Demimonde. Aided by a captive, whom he tortures and later abandons to walkers, Daryl sneaks into the nightclub and rescues Laurent while Fallou and his people create a distraction. Daryl overpowers Quinn while Quinn's girlfriend Anna—disgruntled by Quinn's obsession with Isabelle—lets Daryl and Laurent go. Having fallen in love with Emile, a member of Fallou's community, Sylvie decides to stay in Paris with him. Isabelle also stays to get Quinn to help secure Daryl and Laurent's passage out of Paris as Genet locks the city down. Daryl and Laurent leave Paris on a boat heading to the Nest, the Union's main base.
| 5 | 5 | "Deux Amours" (French for "Two Loves") | Daniel Percival | Jason Richman & David Zabel | October 8, 2023 | 0.628 |
In a flashback in Maine, Daryl helps to capture walkers in exchange for fuel he needs to get home. He makes contact with Carol, who says that someone has come back. After Juno murders a young man whom Daryl was mentoring, an altercation between the two causes them to be put on the Pouvoir ship. Daryl and Juno escape, but Juno is torn apart by one of Pouvoir's test subjects; the walker displays enhanced abilities similar to multiple variants. In the present, Isabelle struggles to adjust to being with Quinn again, even considering killing him with a knife. Isabelle receives a hidden message from Sylvie, Fallou, and Emile. Isabelle agrees to join a Pouvoir celebration with Quinn, only to have a jealous Anna betray them. Daryl, Laurent and Azlan continue their journey to the Nest, but Azlan dies during a fight with walkers. Before dying, he reveals that the Nest is at Mont-Saint-Michel, but Laurent cuts a rope and lets their boat float off, wishing to go to America with Daryl instead. The two and Quinn are captured by guerriers. Genet coerces Laurent into making a show of support at an event she holds, where Genet pits Daryl in a gladiator fight against one of her enhanced walkers; Genet, however, is unaware that Sylvie, Fallou and Emile have infiltrated the event.
| 6 | 6 | "Coming Home" | Daniel Percival | Jason Richman & Laura Snow | October 15, 2023 | 0.688 |
After Daryl kills the walker, Daryl and Quinn, chained together, kill enhanced walkers in the arena before Fallou kills the guerrier Genet ordered to shoot them. In the ensuing chaos, the group escapes, with a bitten Quinn sacrificing himself to buy Daryl time. However, Quinn reanimates, forcing Laurent to put him down with Daryl's encouragement. After going their separate ways from Fallou and Emile, Daryl's group resumes journeying towards Mont-Saint-Michel, but are attacked by Genet's men. Unable to kill a child, Codron shoots the other guerriers instead, promising to get revenge on Daryl later. Upon his return, Genet deduces Codron's betrayal and has him tortured for information. Daryl's group reaches the Nest, where they settle in. Daryl becomes conflicted between staying in France and returning to America. Union of Hope leader Losang arranges passage to Newfoundland for Daryl, who chooses to leave despite Isabelle's comparing his abandoning Laurent to Daryl's abandonment by his own father. At Normandy, Daryl visits the grave of his grandfather William, who died on D-Day. On Omaha Beach, Daryl prepares to board a boat, but hesitates after seeing that Laurent secretly followed him and has walkers closing in on him. Near Freeport, Maine, Carol searches for Daryl, finding his motorcycle. After Carol captures its hostile rider, he directs Carol to where he found it.

=== Season 2: The Book of Carol (2024) ===
A special behind-the-scenes episode titled "The Return" aired alongside the season premiere. Reedus and McBride return to Georgia for the first time since The Walking Dead ended and they look back on their time shooting the series, while visiting key locations from past episodes. The special received 321,000 viewers.

| No. overall | No. in season | Title | Directed by | Written by | Original release date | U.S. viewers (millions) |
|---|---|---|---|---|---|---|
| 7 | 1 | "La Gentillesse des Étrangers" (French for "The Kindness of Strangers") | Greg Nicotero | Shannon Goss | September 29, 2024 | 0.576 |
In France, two weeks later, Daryl trains Laurent in fighting the undead and clashes with Losang about his more violent ways compared to the Union of Hope's pacifism. After Genet's troops capture Fallou and Emile, Daryl leads a raid and rescues them, although Genet escapes before he can shoot her. In Maine, Carol finds the auto repair shop where Daryl had collected walkers, recovers his lost crossbow, and forces the men to tell her that Daryl has been taken to France. Searching for a way to cross the ocean, Carol befriends Ash Patel. Ash, whose young son died, owns a small plane; he obsessively stays on his property—which has a shrine to his son—rather than moving elsewhere. Even though Carol entered Ash's greenhouse without permission, he saves her from a walker attack. By playing on his sympathies and claiming that her daughter Sophia is in France, Carol convinces Ash to fly her to France so that she can search for Sophia. Ash and Carol fly away just as walkers overrun his compound during a power failure that lets them in the gate.
| 8 | 2 | "Moulin Rouge" (French for "Red Mill") | Daniel Percival | Keith Staskiewicz | October 6, 2024 | 0.497 |
Landing in Greenland, Carol and Ash encounter Eun and Hanna, two research scientists who help them fight a surprise walker attack, but quickly turn on them. While Eun threatens violence to force Ash to be a lover/sperm donor, Carol convinces Hanna, who holds Daryl's crossbow on her, to help them escape Greenland. Hanna kills Eun, only to be killed by Ash, who is unaware that Hanna had changed sides. At the Nest, Daryl continues teaching Laurent baseball while offering to take him and Isabelle back to America. Laurent is then kidnapped, causing Daryl, Isabelle, Fallou, and Emile to launch a rescue mission. Laurent's kidnapping, however, is actually a ruse to get rid of Daryl in an ambush that fails. Before Isabelle kills him for his treachery, the traumatized Emile explains that Losang was worried Daryl would take Laurent away and plans to test Laurent's potential immunity by having him publicly bitten. While waiting for low tide, Daryl and Isabelle kiss. Carol and Ash land at a race track outside Paris; Carol's search for Daryl leads to her being taken by Genet's people, who promise food to entice locals to join them. Losang finds that Jacinta ordered the death of Daryl and his friends but is convinced to continue with their plans regardless of his distaste for her actions. Genet tortures Codron for information, unaware that he possesses Azlan's watch showing the Nest's location.
| 9 | 3 | "L'Invisible" (French for "The Invisible") | Michael Slovis | Lisa Zwerling | October 13, 2024 | 0.579 |
In a flashback, Genet and Sabine work as janitors at the Louvre, preparing to go on strike after abuse from supervisors; Genet tries to let her husband inside, but witnesses his death outside by walkers. At the Nest, Sylvie escapes, attempting to find Laurent, but falls to her death during a struggle; Losang states that she lacked faith. Daryl, Isabelle, and Fallou sneak into the Nest as the ceremony starts with Losang attempting to have a zombified Sylvie bite a sedated Laurent. Daryl shoots Sylvie and helps the others escape, but is captured after killing many Union soldiers. While Laurent and Fallou flee, Isabelle is captured and admits her love for Daryl before Losang takes her for interrogation. Carol's search for Daryl at Genet's base Maison Mère, which houses the Mona Lisa (Genet tells Carol that the Louvre's religious paintings convinced her faith is a fraud), leads to her witnessing Genet's research into creating Amper variants and to Codron, who reveals that Daryl is in danger and tells Carol how to find the Nest. Carol's friend Remy betrays her to save his husband, Julien, giving up the Nest's location to Genet. After Carol claims to be trying to kill Daryl, Genet agrees to work with her. Near the Nest, Genet prepares to kill a crowd, including Carol, and turn them into Ampers as weapons for her attack.
| 10 | 4 | "Le Paradis Pour Toi" (French for "Heaven for You") | Michael Slovis | Jason Richman & David Zabel | October 20, 2024 | 0.480 |
Carol plays dead and escapes to the Nest in an ATV with Codron chained to the back for walkers to devour. Upon being released, Codron defends the Nest for Laurent's sake. After Isabelle refuses to tell Losang where to find Laurent, he stabs her. Isabelle helps Carol find Daryl after Carol saves her from an Amper. Daryl convinces a frightened young man to release him, and he reunites with Carol. Isabelle dies in Daryl's arms after making him promise to look after Laurent, then Carol and Daryl escape from the Nest as it falls to Genet. Genet interrogates Losang, who refuses to help her; she argues that if she finds Laurent, God must favor her. Tracking Laurent and Fallou, Daryl and Carol meet Theo and Didi, an elderly couple who provided the other two with a car. As Daryl works on getting another car running, Didi, who thinks that Carol is Isabelle, offers Carol comfort about Carol's losses and mentions that Laurent said Daryl loves Isabelle. Theo betrays Daryl and Carol to Genet, leading to a battle where both Didi and Genet's forces are killed. Carol shoots Genet with her own Amper serum, resulting in Genet's death. With Genet dead, Sabine and Pouvoir turn to Losang. He preaches "forgiveness" and unites the two factions in the hunt for Laurent, who will lead them to "the promised land".
| 11 | 5 | "Vouloir, C'est Pouvoir" (French for "To Want Is to Be Able") | Daniel Percival | Jason Richman & David Zabel | October 27, 2024 | 0.504 |
Daryl and Carol find Ash missing; a man caught in Ash's door-trap begs Daryl to euthanize him, and he does. At the Demimonde, now run by Anna, Daryl and Carol learn that Pouvoir has fallen in the aftermath of Genet's death with some guerriers joining Losang, and others working at the club. The duo tracks Ash to Maison Mère—which has also fallen—where he has become trapped by a herd and knocked unconscious while trying to get fuel for his plane. Daryl turns two zombified guerriers into Ampers to get rid of the herd. A remorseful Codron surrenders to Fallou's community, revealing the Nest's fall to them. When Losang shows up looking for Laurent, Codron helps him escape to the Demimonde while Fallou's people reject Losang; the crowd applauds as Fallou explains that if Laurent is needed as proof, then Losang lacks real faith. Losang appears at the Demimonde and pursues his quarry to the Catacombs of Paris. Codron kills Dr. Lafleur and defeats Jacinta, who survives; Daryl nearly loses to Losang but then kills him with a skull before he and Codron make peace with each other. Anna provides the fuel that the plane needs but Ash, furious after Carol admits the truth, reveals that his plane holds only three people, meaning that someone must stay behind.
| 12 | 6 | "Au Revoir les Enfants" (French for "Goodbye Children") | Daniel Percival | Story by : Laura Snow; Teleplay by : Jason Richman & David Zabel | November 3, 2024 | 0.476 |
Daryl and Carol argue about which one of them will stay behind, although Daryl convinces Ash to take Laurent to the Commonwealth. Carol also returns Daryl's crossbow to him. While on a supply run, Fallou, Codron, and their new friend Akila are attacked by guerriers searching for the plane while Jacinta ambushes Anna, eventually making a deal to give her the plane and pilot. However, Anna, who remembers Laurent kindly, betrays Jacinta and leads her into a parking garage full of burners. Jacinta is bitten but ultimately locks Anna in to be devoured. The Union and Pouvoir attack the race track, but Daryl, Fallou, and Codron buy time for Ash and Laurent to escape, joined by Carol who eventually chooses to stay behind. Devastated, Jacinta commits suicide. Daryl reveals the truth about Michel's death to Codron while Fallou decides to stay in France with Akila, having fallen in love with her. Fallou's friends, Scottish couple Angus and Fiona, lead Daryl, Carol, and Codron to attempt to cross to England using the Chunnel; they encounter dead British soldiers and walkers who, like much of the Chunnel, are bioluminescent. The psychoactive effects of bat guano cause everyone to hallucinate: Codron hallucinates Michel, eventually running off after him after fighting with Daryl who he thought killed Michel as a walker, while Carol hallucinates herself as a walker, and also her daughter, finally helping Carol to come to terms with her death; Daryl hallucinates Isabelle, fireflies, and his grandfather. Daryl is forced to kill the treacherous Angus and Fiona in self-defense, and he and Carol put on gas masks and leave France, heading for England.

=== Season 3 (2025) ===
| No. overall | No. in season | Title | Directed by | Written by | Original release date | U.S. viewers (millions) |
|---|---|---|---|---|---|---|
| 13 | 1 | "Costa da Morte" (Galician for "Coast of Death") | Daniel Percival | Jason Richman & David Zabel | September 7, 2025 | 0.241 |
Daryl and Carol reach London, only to find the city abandoned and overrun by a massive walker horde. Trapped in an apartment building for days, the two meet Julian Chamberlain, a man who believes himself to be the last survivor in the country after England fell to the undead and people turning on each other years before. Julian reveals that he has a sailboat and agrees to sail to America with the two. Julian uses Big Ben to draw off the herd and the three set sail, but encounter a storm and a tsunami which wrecks the boat on the Costa da Morte in Spain. Carol suffers a head injury and a shoulder wound that gets infected while Julian dies, becomes a walker, and is killed by Daryl. At night, a group wearing horned bone masks loot the boat, forcing Daryl and Carol inland in search of supplies and treatment for her injuries. While Daryl is out hunting, Carol vanishes.
| 14 | 2 | "La Ofrenda" (Spanish for "The Offering") | Daniel Percival | Jason Richman & David Zabel | September 14, 2025 | 0.223 |
Daryl finds Carol observing a young couple, Roberto and Justina, who are attacked by bandits. Daryl kills most of the bandits, but one, Manuel, escapes. The couple is revealed to be running away together, but Daryl forces them to take him and Carol back to their community, Solaz del Mar. (Note: Spanish for "Solace of the Sea".) Justina's grandmother Marga treats Carol's infection while Roberto's father Antonio gives them a place to stay and tools to fix the boat. However, it's revealed that once a year, the community leader Federico trades girls for protection to El Alcázar (Note: Spanish for "The Fortress".) who are led by Guillermo Torres who is supposedly the last of the Spanish monarchy. While Carol wants to get involved and openly questions this tradition, Daryl is only interested in getting home and refuses Roberto's pleas to take him and Justina with them. Guillermo's wife Elena, a girl taken from Barcelona, is secretly in love with Paz, a gitana cowgirl from Solaz del Mar. Discovering that Manuel is actually an El Alcázar soldier, Daryl lures him out and kills him and two of his men during the celebrations after Manuel recognizes Daryl from their earlier encounter.
| 15 | 3 | "El Sacrificio" (Spanish for "The Sacrifice") | Daniel Percival | Jason Richman & David Zabel | September 21, 2025 | 0.279 |
Following the disappearance of his men, Guillermo furiously threatens to withdraw his protection from Solaz as a result of the increasing disrespect that he has been shown. Daryl instructs Carol, who wants to get involved in the situation against Daryl's wishes, to steal Antonio's solar panel, but she bonds with the man instead who is revealed to have a love of cinema. The two watch The Exterminating Angel together. Justina struggles with guilt over Alba being chosen instead of her and seeks advice from Carol before volunteering to go with El Alcázar in Alba's place. In exchange for coming to America with Daryl and Carol, Roberto agrees to help Daryl to fix Julian's boat, leading him to Valentina, a former cruise ship captain. Valentina determines that Daryl will need to fix a hole below the waterline and replace the rudder before the boat is seaworthy again. Fighting off a small herd, Daryl and Roberto are able to scavenge a rudder from a wrecked boat and on their way back, Daryl leaves Laurent's Rubik's Cube on the Camino de Santiago.
| 16 | 4 | "La Justicia Fronteriza" (Spanish for "Border Justice") | Paco Cabezas | Shannon Goss | September 28, 2025 | 0.198 |
Following the departure of Justina, a devastated Roberto decides to stay in Solaz and clashes with his father and Fede. With the help of Valentina's crew, Daryl and Carol are able to repair Julian's boat and agree to take on Cooper, an American sailor who desires to return home again. However, a group of hostile survivors known as the Primitivos (Note: Spanish for "Primitives".) attack, killing Cooper before the group kills them. At the same time, Solaz comes under attack by dozens of Primitivos seeking to destroy the community. Daryl and Carol return to help repel the invasion which includes flaming walkers launched by catapults over the walls. Although both sides suffer massive casualties, the use of a gatling gun and a ballista traded from El Alcázar drive the remaining Primitivos off. A captured Primitivo only reveals that the group wants to destroy everything before he is executed by being tied to a chain gang of zombified Primitivos who devour him. Fede uses this new threat as proof that Solaz needs El Alcázar more than ever, but Roberto steals a jeep to go after Justina. Carol and Antonio go after him accompanied, reluctantly, by Daryl. The three discover that Roberto and Justina were reunited, but were captured after their jeep crashed.
| 17 | 5 | "Limbo" | Paco Cabezas | Jason Richman & David Zabel | October 5, 2025 | 0.242 |
Daryl, Carol and Antonio rescue a badly injured Roberto from two El Alcázar soldiers who try to feed the young man to a herd. Roberto reveals that Justina, having discovered that Fede had rigged La Ofrenda in her favor, threatened to expose him if Fede didn't stop. Fede traded Justina instead of Alba in order to protect his secret; Justina never volunteered. Carol and Antonio take Roberto back to Solaz for treatment from Marga who warns that Roberto is losing his will to live. Marga later confronts Fede with Justina's compass, arousing his suspicions that Carol and Antonio may know the truth. Daryl continues alone towards Barcelona, but is ambushed by the Buzzards, a gang of bandits. Losing his motorcycle, Daryl is found by the Limbos, a leper colony living in Belchite whose water has been stolen by the Buzzards. Sympathetic to their plight, Daryl helps the Limbos to fight back, killing most of the Buzzards in an ambush. Daryl then boards their walker pulled train, kills the Buzzards' leader Chofo and returns the Limbos' water to them before continuing on his journey to rescue Justina.
| 18 | 6 | "Contrabando" (Spanish for "Smuggling") | Daniel Percival | Marta Gene Camps | October 12, 2025 | 0.254 |
In Solaz, Carol and Antonio continue to grow closer, culminating in a kiss, while Fede discovers the zombified El Alcázar soldiers killed by Daryl days before. Fede poisons Roberto in an attempt to silence the young man, but Carol saves him with help from Marga after realizing what Fede did. It's revealed that Antonio and Fede's feud comes from both men being in love with Maria, Antonio's late wife. While filming a documentary with Antonio, Maria was killed in an ETA bombing for which Antonio blames himself and Fede uses as leverage over him. Carol helps Roberto escape while Antonio publicly confronts Fede about his actions. In Barcelona, Daryl is joined by Paz who opens up to him about her relationship with Elena and leads Daryl to a refugee community in Park Güell opposing El Alcázar. Daryl convinces the group to ambush the El Alcázar convoy at the Ciutat Vella checkpoint. However, the ambush is unsuccessful in both killing Guillermo and rescuing the girls. Daryl and Paz agree to push on together to El Alcázar itself. In flashbacks, a frightened young Daryl runs away from his abusive father at the insistence of Merle and Maria reanimates after the explosion, having died on the first day of the zombie apocalypse.
| 19 | 7 | "Solaz del Mar" (Spanish for "Solace of the Sea") | Daniel Percival | Jason Richman & David Zabel | October 19, 2025 | 0.251 |
Traveling the Camino de Santiago, Codron finds Laurent's Rubik's Cube. Carol sneaks into Solaz where Fede is torturing Antonio via strappado for information. Carol, Rodo and Daniel rescue Antonio, but the other two men are killed while Carol and Antonio hide with the help of sympathetic residents before being betrayed and turned over to Fede along with a captured Roberto. Daryl and Paz infiltrate El Alcázar as workers for the Matching ceremony. Daryl unleashes a horde on the people and sets the palace on fire, killing most of the nobles, including the king and queen of Spain. Daryl rescues Justina and the other girls while Paz and Elena kill Guillermo. With El Alcázar having fallen, Paz decides to move with Elena, her son and the other girls to the refugee community. Daryl and Justina return to discover their friends in danger. Justina exposes Fede's crimes, causing the townspeople to turn on and imprison their leader. Daryl opens up to Carol about his past and Daryl's constant need to be on the move which he fears will linger when they get home. The night before Daryl, Carol, Antonio, Roberto and Justina are to set sail, a vengeful Fede is set free by his mother and attacks Daryl, resulting in the destruction of the boat which is witnessed from a distance by Codron. Daryl's group is once again left without a way home.

=== Season 4 ===
| No. overall | No. in season | Title | Directed by | Written by | Original release date | U.S. viewers (millions) |
|---|---|---|---|---|---|---|
| 20 | 1 | TBA | TBD | Jason Richman | February 2027 | TBD |

The remaining credited writers for the 8-episode fourth season are:

2. Richman & David Zabel
3. Shannon Goss
4. Raul Martin Romero
5. Goss & Kiersten Stanley
6. Richman & Zabel
7. George Samir Nader & Richman
8. Richman & Zabel

== Production ==
=== Development ===
The series was announced in September 2020 by Angela Kang and Scott M. Gimple. Reedus and McBride signed on to reprise their respective roles from the television series.

In April 2022, McBride exited the series due to logistical reasons as the show was set to film in mid-2022 in Europe and it wasn't possible for McBride to be with the show with this setup. The series was reworked as a sole Daryl project. Days later, Kang had left the role of showrunner and was replaced by David Zabel. The deal had reportedly been sealed in recent weeks before McBride's exit from the show. In October, the series was given the title Daryl Dixon. In January 2023, it was announced that the series would be titled The Walking Dead: Daryl Dixon and premiere later in 2023.

In July 2023, ahead of the first season's release, the series was renewed for a second season. The second season has the subtitle of The Book of Carol. A third season was in development by February 2024. In July 2024, the series was renewed for a third season. Unlike the first two seasons, it was produced and set in Spain. On July 25, 2025, the series was renewed for a fourth and final season, which will consist of eight episodes.

=== Writing ===
In September 2020, Kang was hired as showrunner after she had helmed the final three seasons of The Walking Dead.

In April 2022, Kang stepped down due to other commitments and Zabel took the role. Scripts were already being written by this time but needed to be reworked following McBride's departure. In September, in an interview with Entertainment Weekly, Reedus explained that the series would be going an opposite direction from the main series having it being a completely different story from what we have already seen with Daryl. The following month, Reedus said that there would be familiar faces from the main series in the spin-off.

=== Casting ===
In November 2022, Clémence Poésy and Adam Nagaitis were added to the main cast. In February 2023, Anne Charrier, Eriq Ebouaney, Laïka Blanc-Francard, Romain Levi and Louis Puech Scigliuzzi were announced as additional cast members. In June 2023, The Walking Dead alum Jeffrey Dean Morgan indicated in a tweet that Melissa McBride would reprise her role as Carol Peletier in some capacity. In October 2023, at New York Comic Con, McBride was confirmed to return for the second season, as well as guest starring in the first season finale.

In November 2023, Manish Dayal was announced to have joined the cast for the second season in a recurring role.

In September 2024, Eduardo Noriega, Óscar Jaenada, Alexandra Masangkay, Hugo Arbués, and Candela Saitta were announced to have joined the cast as series regulars for the third season. In October, Stephen Merchant was announced to have joined the cast. In June 2025, Greta Fernández, Gonzalo Bouza, Hada Nieto, Yassmine Othman, and Cuco Usín were announced to have joined the cast in supporting roles.

In May 2026, Melina Matthews was announced to have joined the cast for the fourth season. In September, Jimmy Smits was announced to have joined the cast.

=== Filming ===
Principal photography began on October 24, 2022, in Paris, France. Filming for the second season continued in France during the 2023 SAG-AFTRA strike due to an agreement between AMC and SAG-AFTRA to resume production. Filming for the second season wrapped on December 21, 2023.

Filming for the third season began in August 2024 in Madrid, Spain, and had wrapped by February 13, 2025. Locations used for filming included El Espinar, Sepúlveda, Carnota, Madrid, Belchite, and Granada. Filming for the fourth and final season began in August 2025 and had wrapped by November 20, 2025. Locations used for filming included Madrid, Barcelona, El Espinar, Sepúlveda, Alcalá de Henares, Badalona, and Bilbao.

== Release ==
The series premiered on September 10, 2023, on AMC and AMC+. The first season was released on Blu-ray and DVD on February 13, 2024. The second season, subtitled The Book of Carol, premiered on September 29, 2024. The third season premiered on September 7, 2025. The fourth and final season is set to premiere in February 2027.

== Reception ==
The Walking Dead: Daryl Dixon has received positive reviews from critics, with several calling it the best Walking Dead content in years, although some noted its similarities to The Last of Us television series. On Rotten Tomatoes, the first season has an approval rating of 70% based on 42 reviews with an average rating of 8.2/10. The website's critics consensus is, "Centering Norman Reedus' fan favorite character in a fresh setting, Daryl Dixon can be a wobbly shot across the crossbow but still gives The Walking Dead faithful plenty more to chew on." Metacritic, which uses a weighted average, scored the first season 67 out of 100 based on 16 critics, indicating "generally favorable" reviews.

David Opie of Digital Spy gave it a 4/5 rating and called it "The best Walking Dead has been in ages". Chase Hutchinson of Collider gave it a "B" rating and applauded Norman Reedus' "stoic performance" that has a "renewed energy to the character and making the spin-off worth watching" and that the series "focuses more on character and emotion rather than empty spectacle, giving the story a greater sense of depth." Aaron Pruner of TheWrap gave it a positive review and noted Clémence Poésy's "standout performance" and concluded that it "is a surprisingly gorgeous, soul-stirring, and riveting watch. Norman Reedus said they were making art with this show. And you know what? He wasn't lying."

For the second season, 71% of 14 critic reviews on Rotten Tomatoes were positive, with an average rating of 6.5/10. The website's critics consensus is, "Bringing Carol back into the fold cuts into some of the elements that made this Walking Dead spinoff unique, but having Norman Reedus and Melissa McBride sharing the screen again will always be an undead treat." Metacritic scored the second season 62 out of 100 based on 7 critics, indicating "generally favorable" reviews.

For the third season, 83% of 6 critic reviews on Rotten Tomatoes were positive, with an average rating of 7/10. Metacritic scored the third season 65 out of 100 based on 4 critics, indicating "generally favorable" reviews.

The series was nominated for the 24th Visual Effects Society Awards in the category of Outstanding Supporting Visual Effects in a Photoreal Episode for "Costa da Morte".
