= Salvador Calvo =

Spanish film and television director

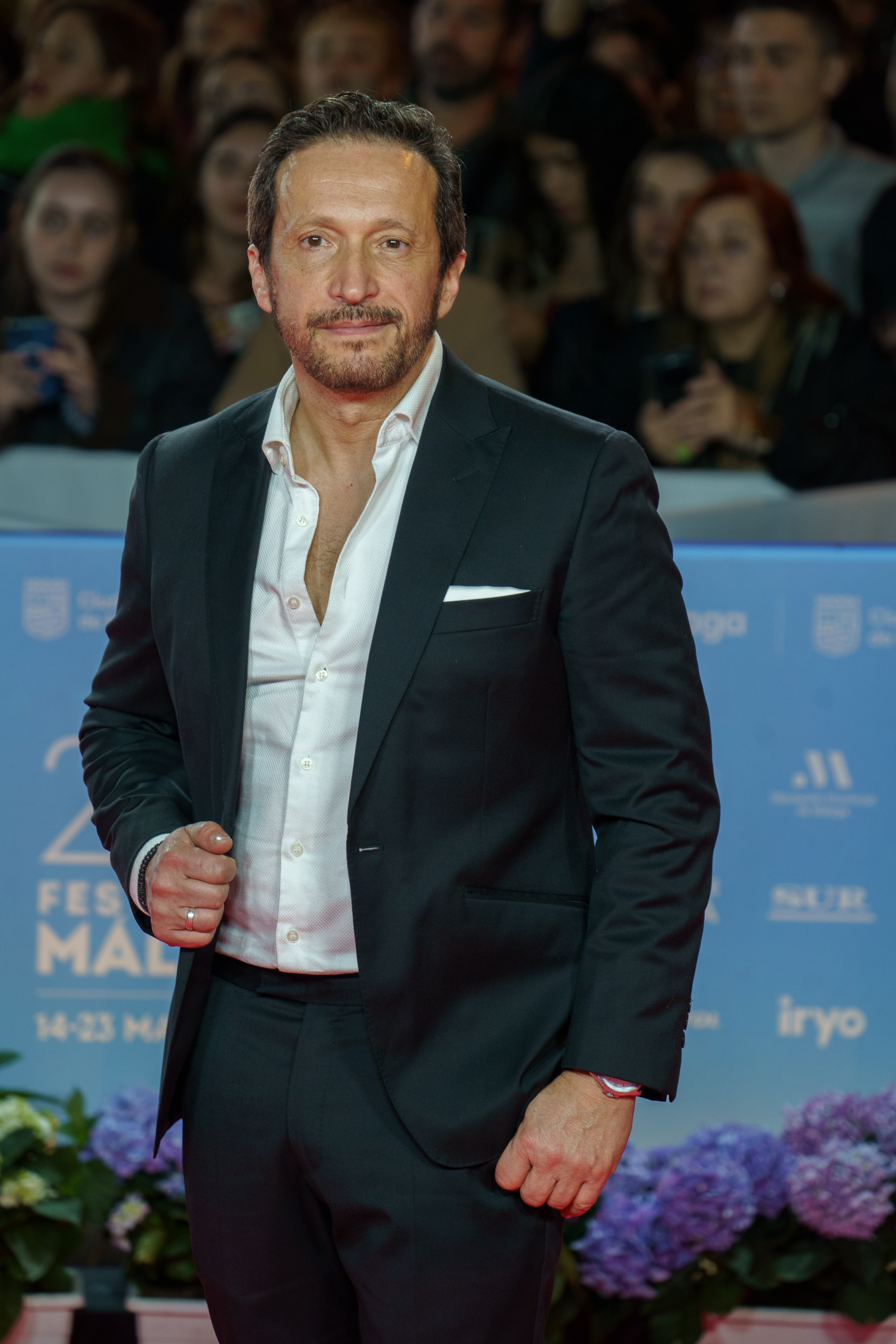
- Calvo in 2025
- Born: 1970 (age 55–56); Madrid, Spain
- Education: Complutense University of Madrid
- Occupation: Film director
- Spouse: Juan Luis Arcos
- Children: 1

Salvador Calvo (born 1970) is a Spanish film and television director.

== Biography ==
Calvo was born 1970 in Madrid. He earned a licentiate degree in Information Sciences (Journalism) from the Complutense University of Madrid. Instead of focusing on a career in journalism, Calvo trained as a director under Pilar Miró, Juan Carlos Corazza and Pilar Hermida.

He took part in several television series such as Sin tetas no hay paraíso (2007), Los misterios de Laura (2009), Niños robados (2012) and Las aventuras del capitán Alatriste (2013), as well as biopic miniseries such as La Duquesa, La Duquesa II, Paquirri (2009) and Mario Conde. Los días de gloria (2013).

His debut as director in a feature film came with the 2016 war drama 1898, Our Last Men in the Philippines, which earned him a nomination to the Goya Award for Best New Director. In March 2021, he won the Goya Award for Best Director for the 2020 drama film Adú.

== Personal life ==
As of 2021, Calvo is married to architect Juan Luis Arcos. They have one daughter.

== Filmography ==
Feature films

- 1898: Los últimos de Filipinas (1898, Our Last Men in the Philippines) (2016)
- Adú (2020)
- Valle de sombras (2024)
- La fiera (2026)

Short films

- Maras (2019)

TV miniseries

- Mario Conde. Los días de gloria (2013)
- Niños robados (2013)
- Hermanos (episodes 1–2, 5–6) (2014)
- Cuéntame un cuento (episode 4: "Hansel y Gretel") (2014)
- Lo que escondían sus ojos (2016)
- El padre de Caín (2016)
