= Stolen Children (miniseries) =

- Niños robados
- Genre: Historical drama
- Directed by: Salvador Calvo
- Starring: Adriana Ugarte; Emilio Gutiérrez Caba; Blanca Portillo
- Country of origin: Spain
- Original language: Spanish
- No. of seasons: 1
- No. of episodes: 2

Production
- Production companies: Telecinco; MOD Producciones

Original release
- Network: Telecinco
- Release: 16 October – 17 October 2013

Stolen Children (Spanish: Niños robados) is a two-part Spanish television miniseries inspired by historical deeds that re-creates the history of two youngsters who they are forced to confront their pregnancy alone in the francoist period of the Spain of 1970. After nine months of gestation, both give birth in the same hospital, although in different circumstances, and are separated from their babies after birth.

== Background ==
The history of the project dates back to June 2012 when the Spanish television channel Telecinco announced that it was preparing a series of actual fiction of stolen children in the 1970s. However, also had influence on the impact of media production Sor Maria, Spanish nun who jumped to the TV as one of the alleged responsible for the theft of children in maternity clinics in Madrid in the second half of the twentieth century.

== History ==
Although the Spanish chain Antena 3 was the first interested in adapting a project on the history of children stolen in Spain, while later the media group Mediaset Spain Communication, announced that he was trying to produce their own version of the facts to its main channel, Telecinco, under the provisional mark Stolen Children. The chain Grupo Planeta started at the end of March 2011 its project called Stories stolen and he told the story of twin brothers who were separated at birth. However, the miniseries where Mediaset was working in mid-June 2012, would have the drama that these families lived in the 70s since lost their babies to the current date. Both productions had two episodes for broadcast, and although Telecinco series set to release his first rival chain, Antena 3, it did it first. Atresmedia Televisión aired during the month of September 2012, while that of Mediaset did a year later, in mid- October 2013, ceded an area of discussion focused on the case of the stolen children with Telecinco reports and real testimonials. The telefilm also has a program with real cases called Stolen Children, where are they??, and it is presented by the journalist Jordi Gonzalez.

== Plot ==
Stolen Children revolves around two young girls in 1970's Spain, forced to confront their pregnancy alone. One of them, Violeta, spends her last months of pregnancy in a religious shelter located in Madrid, while the other, Conchita, resides temporarily in an apartment in Bilbao paid by a woman of high society. Once the nine-month pregnancy is over, both give birth in the same clinic, although in different circumstances, and both are separated from their babies after giving birth. This situation fills their lives with tragedy, which they continue to live separately until later, when a young woman named Susana knocks on Conchita's door in search of her identity. This is the point in her life's journey which reveals what really happened the day that Violet and Conchita gave birth.

== Technical team ==
=== Production ===
Niños robados was produced by Telecinco in collaboration with MOD Producciones. The miniseries was directed by Salvador Calvo. and written by Helena Medina. For six weeks, the production team welcomed nearly forty different recording points located in the cities of Madrid and Bilbao, as well as in the town of Alcobendas and in the town of San Rafael. As for the chosen scenarios for fiction, direction chose two historic buildings: the old Puerta de Hierro Hospital and the Instituto Cardenal Cisneros; additional images of the exterior include the Railway Museum of Madrid, Almudena Cemetery, the geriatric center La Aurora, and several streets of Bilbao. Also, to represent the interior of a building decorated in the style of the 70s were used in order to provide authenticity of this story.

== Distribution ==
- Conchita, performed by Nadia de Santiago (young) in Part I and by Pepa Aniorte (adult) in Part II.
- Violeta, performed by Macarena García (young) in Part I and by Manuela Paso (adult) in Part II.
- Sor Eulalia, performed by Blanca Portillo.
- Sor Herminia, performed by Silvia Marty.
- Doctor Mena, performed by Emilio Gutiérrez Caba.
- Dolores del Prat, performed by Belinda Washington.
- Susana, performed by Adriana Ugarte.
- Elisa, performed by Alicia Borrachero.
- Ricardo, performed by Eduard Farelo.
- Óscar, performed by Diego Martín.
- Álex, performed by Patrick Criado.
- Juan, performed by Víctor Sevilla (young) in Part I.

== Episodes and audiences ==
Episode	Title	Date of broadcast	Audience	Ref.
1	«Stolen Children (First part)»	16 October 2013	4 079 000 (22,3%)	
2	«Stolen Children (Second part)»	17 October 2013	3 757 000 (22,1%)	

=== Audience in Italy ===
In Italy, Stolen Children, under the title 'Io ti troverò', was issued on 30 April 2015 with an audience of 3.337.000 viewers and 15,2% of share.

=== Audience in Argentina ===
In Argentinian Stolen Children was issued the 18 and 19 May 2015, and reiterated the 4 and 5 January 2016.

Episode	Title	Date of broadcast	Audience
1	«Stolen Children (First part)»	18 May 2015	10.8
2	«Stolen Children (Second part)»	19 May 2015	13.0
