= Sociedad de Crédito Mobiliario Español =

19th-century Spanish bank

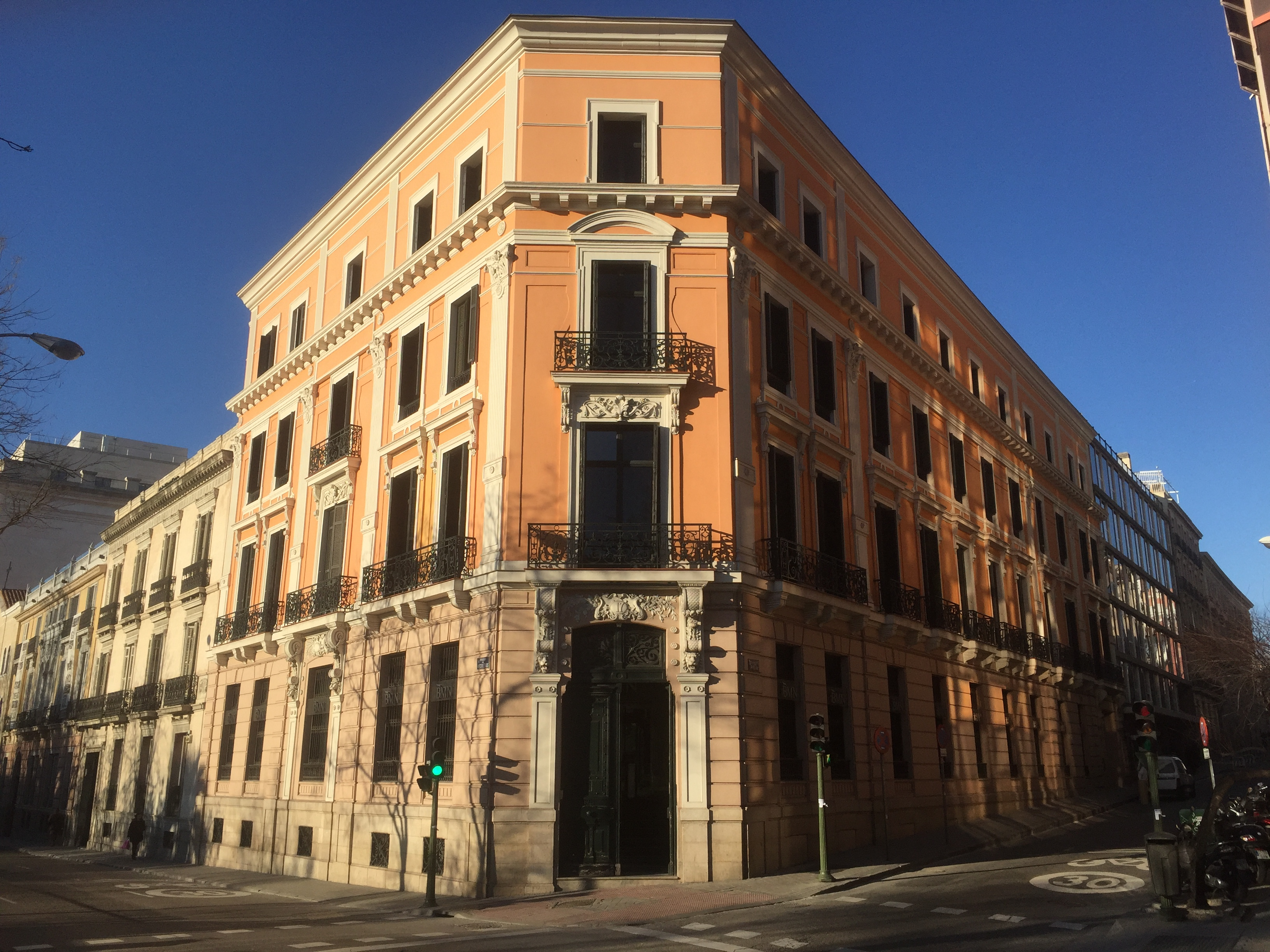
- Current appearance of the company's former headquarters.
- Company type: S.A.
- Industry: Banking
- Genre: Finances
- Founded: January 28, 1856
- Founder: Pereire brothers
- Defunct: 1902
- Headquarters: Paseo de Recoletos, 17 c/v Calle Prim, 14., Madrid, Spain

Sociedad General de Crédito Mobiliario Español was a financial company founded in the mid-19th century with French capital and structure. Its headquarters were built in 1869 in Paseo de Recoletos in Madrid designed by Sainz de la Lastra. In 1902, the Sociedad de Crédito Mobiliario Español was re-founded under the name of Banco Español de Crédito (Banesto), one of whose first presidents was the Marquis of Cortina.

== History ==
The Sociedad de Crédito Mobiliario Español was born as a banking company of French capital promoted by Isaac Pereire, founder of the French bank Crédit Mobilier. It was incorporated in Madrid on January 28, 1856, under the new Law of Credit Companies under the name of Sociedad General de Crédito Mobiliario Español. This company was mainly dedicated to cover the budgetary deficit of the Spanish Government, through acquisitions of public debt, and to the concession of financial credits to public companies.

One of its most important administrators was Federico Luque Velázquez, an associate of the Pereire brothers. Luque and the Pereire brothers competed through Crédito Mobiliario Español and Compañía de los Caminos de Hierro del Norte de España with Baron Rothschild and his representatives in Spain, Daniel Weisweiller and Ignacio Bauer, who controlled their competitors: the railway company MZA and Compañía General de Crédito de España. Crédito Mobiliario Español would participate in the creation, in 1856, of the Compagnie des Mines de Cuivre de Huelva, which controlled several mines in the Tharsis-La Zarza mining basin. In its early years, the company experienced an economic boom and distributed high dividends.

After the war in Cuba, the financial reforms of Raimundo Fernández Villaverde in 1900 and the repatriation of capital from the former American colonies, its shareholders decided to liquidate the company and found a new one, Banco Español de Crédito, created on May 1, 1902, with a capital stock of 20 million pesetas represented by 80,000 shares with a par value of 250 pesetas. The promoter of the bank was a French group presided by Gustavo Pereire. Cayetano Sánchez Bustillo and León Cocagne (deputy director of the Banco Hipotecario de España) joined this initiative in representation of a group of Spanish investors. Its headquarters would continue to be the building of the Sociedad de Crédito Mobiliario, located in Madrid's Paseo de Recoletos.

== See also ==
- List of banks in Spain

== Bibliography ==
- Costa, María Teresa (1983). La financiación exterior del capitalismo español en el siglo XIX (in Spanish). Universidad de Barcelona.
- García Ruiz, José Luis (2003). "Fundación y primeros pasos del Banco Español de Crédito". Estudios de historia y de pensamiento económico: homenaje al profesor Francisco Bustelo García del Real (in Spanish). Editorial Complutense. pp. 319–326. ISBN 978-84-7491-733-8.
