= Alfonso Cortina =

Spanish businessman (1944–2020)

Alfonso Cortina de Alcocer (13 March 1944 – 6 April 2020) was a Spanish businessman. He was chairman and chief executive officer of Repsol YPF, Spain's largest oil and gas group.

== Biography ==
Cortina was born on 13 March 1944 in Madrid. His father Pedro Cortina Mauri, originally from Catalonia, was foreign minister during the Francoist dictatorship. His maternal grandfather Alberto Alcocer y Ribacoba, originally from Biscay, was Mayor of Madrid in the 1920s and again in the 1930s. His brother Alberto Cortina and cousin Alberto Alcocer are both noted business executives, known collectively as 'The Albertos' due to their shared career path and prominence in public life.

He graduated in Industrial Engineering and held a further degree in Economic Sciences. He began his career in the banking sector, where he held various positions at BBVA, Banco Zaragozano and Banco Central. Alfonso Cortina de Alcocer became president of the Spanish oil firm Repsol in 1996 despite his lack of experience in the petroleum industry.

- 1968–1982: Banco de Vizcaya Group (various positions including engineer, vice chairman, and managing director).
- 1984–1990: Portland Valderrivas (vice president).
- 1990–1996: Portland Valderrivas (president).
- 1996–2004: Repsol YPF (President, Chairman, and CEO).

He also served as Vice Chairman and Senior Advisor for Spain and Latin America, Rothschild Europe.

He died on 6 April 2020 of COVID-19 at the age of 76.
