= Alberto Cortina =

Spanish businessman

- Born: Alberto Cortina de Alcocer; 20 January 1946 (age 79); Madrid, Spain
- Occupation: Businessperson
- Spouse(s): Alicia Koplowitz (1969–1990, divorced); Elena Cué (m. 2000)
- Children: 4
- Father: Pedro Cortina y Mauri
- Relatives: Alfonso Cortina (brother); Alberto Alcocer y Ribacoba (grandfather)
- Website: fundacionalbertoyelenacortina.com

Alberto Cortina de Alcocer (born 20 January 1947) is a Spanish billionaire businessman. Through his holding Percacer, he is co-owner, with his cousin Alberto Alcocer, of Alcor Holding, the owner of 12.5% of Grupo ACS, the biggest construction company in the world by sales with 2014 revenues of US$50b, and of 21% of Ence, the largest paper pulp and biomass energy company in Europe. He has appeared several years in Forbes List of Billionaires with US$1.4 billion.

== Biography ==
Cortina studied law at the Universidad Complutense de Madrid. His life has run parallel to that of his cousin Alberto Alcocer. In Spain both cousins are commonly referred to as "The Albertos", as they both married two sisters and ran their wives business empire for 20 years. His father Pedro Cortina Mauri, originally from Catalonia, was foreign minister during the Francoist dictatorship. His maternal grandfather Alberto Alcocer y Ribacoba, originally from Biscay, was Mayor of Madrid in the 1920s and again in the 1930s.

In 1969 he married Alicia Koplowitz. After that, he and his cousin started working for Fomento de Construcciones y Contratas, the company founded by Alicia's father. By the year 1976 he became CEO of the company.

Driven by the talent of Cortina and Alcocer, and through a never before tried diversification from its core building business into other sectors, the company grew greatly in value over a period of 18 years. This growth was accomplished in spite of the Spanish crisis that took place between the years of 1973 and 1985. The company that was having a turnover of 1,000 million pesetas when Alberto joined it, became a diversified group of over 30 companies, with a total turnover of close to 300,000 million pesetas and a valuation of US$3b.

In 1978, both Albertos acquired 5% of Banco de Fomento, belonging to Banco Central. Three years later, they acquire a significant stake in Portland Valderrivas, a cement company owned by Banesto, on which they placed Alberto Cortina's elder brother, Alfonso Cortina, as head of the company.

In 1982 they acquired Banco Zaragozano. Later, in 1988, together with KIO Group they created Cartera Central which had a significant stake in Banco Central and two seats on its board of directors. They tried to take over the bank Banco Central but were blocked in their attempt by the Government due to anti-monopoly rules. Banco Zaragozano was valued in US$15m at acquisition and they sold it for over US$2b to Barclay's Bank in 2003.

In 1997, Alberto sold the brewing business San Miguel that he and his brother had inherited from their father to the consortium of Danone and Mahou.

In 1998, both "Albertos" took at a controlling stake in ACS Group, today's largest construction and services group by revenues, with sales of EUR €40b worldwide in 2015. Among its subsidiaries are the German construction company Hochtief, Australian conglomerate CIMIC Group, Spanish construction company Dragados, Spanish electrical engineering Cobra and waste management company Urbaser. The executive chairman of ACS, Florentino Pérez is also the chairman of Real Madrid Football Club.

In 2000 he married Elena Cué at his estate "Las Cuevas", with whom he had a daughter in 2006.

In 2010 Forbes magazine included Cortina in their billionaires list ranking as the 828th wealthiest man in the world.

In June 2015 Banque de Dakar starts to provide financial services at its headquarters in the capital of Senegal and providing banking services at a Pan African level focusing in the UEMOA region. The bank is controlled by the BDK Financial Group led by Cortina along with various relevant shareholders. In February 2016 Alfredo Sáenz Abad is appointed president of the bank and in March he acquires 5% of BDK's shares.

== Charitable Foundation ==
In 2011, Alberto Cortina and Elena Cué created the Alberto and Elena Cortina Foundation. The foundation started with various projects in parallel. In 2011 it helped the victims of the 2010 Haiti earthquake by distributing food aid during that year and by reconstructing homes and other infrastructures. The foundation also provided help to woman at risk of Social exclusion, free housing and a soup kitchen. In 2012 the foundation started the invisible kitchen service, through it food and other basic supplies are distributed to families in need at their own homes. Another project promoted by the foundation is the "Econosolidario", the only grocery store in Spain where the families designated by social services can use a card that holds points to "buy" the basic products they need.

== Business titles ==
Alberto Cortina has held the following titles:

- Executive chair of Banco Zaragozano, S.A.
- board of directors of A.C. Hoteles
- Chair of Electronic Trading System, S.A.
- board of directors of Dragados
- board of directors and member of the executive committee of Telefónica
- board of directors of Telefónica Internacional (TISA)
- board of directors and member of the executive committee of TPI, S.A.
- board of directors and member of the executive committee of Terra Networks
- board of directors of Telefónica Argentina y Cointel, S.A.
- board of directors of Autopista Vasco-Aragonesa, C.E.S.A.
- CEO of Construcciones y Contratas, S.A. from 1971 to 1989
- board of directors and member of the executive committee of Banco Central
- Vice-chair, board of directors and member of the executive committee of Banco Español de Crédito
- board of directors and member of the executive committee of Portland Valderrivas, S.A. from 1986 to 1992
- board of directors and member of the executive committee of NH Hoteles, S.A. from 1989 to 1993
- board of directors and member of the executive committee of Corporación Financiera Reunida, S.A. (COFIR) from 1987 to 1992
