= Alfredo Sáenz Abad =

Spanish businessman (born 1942)

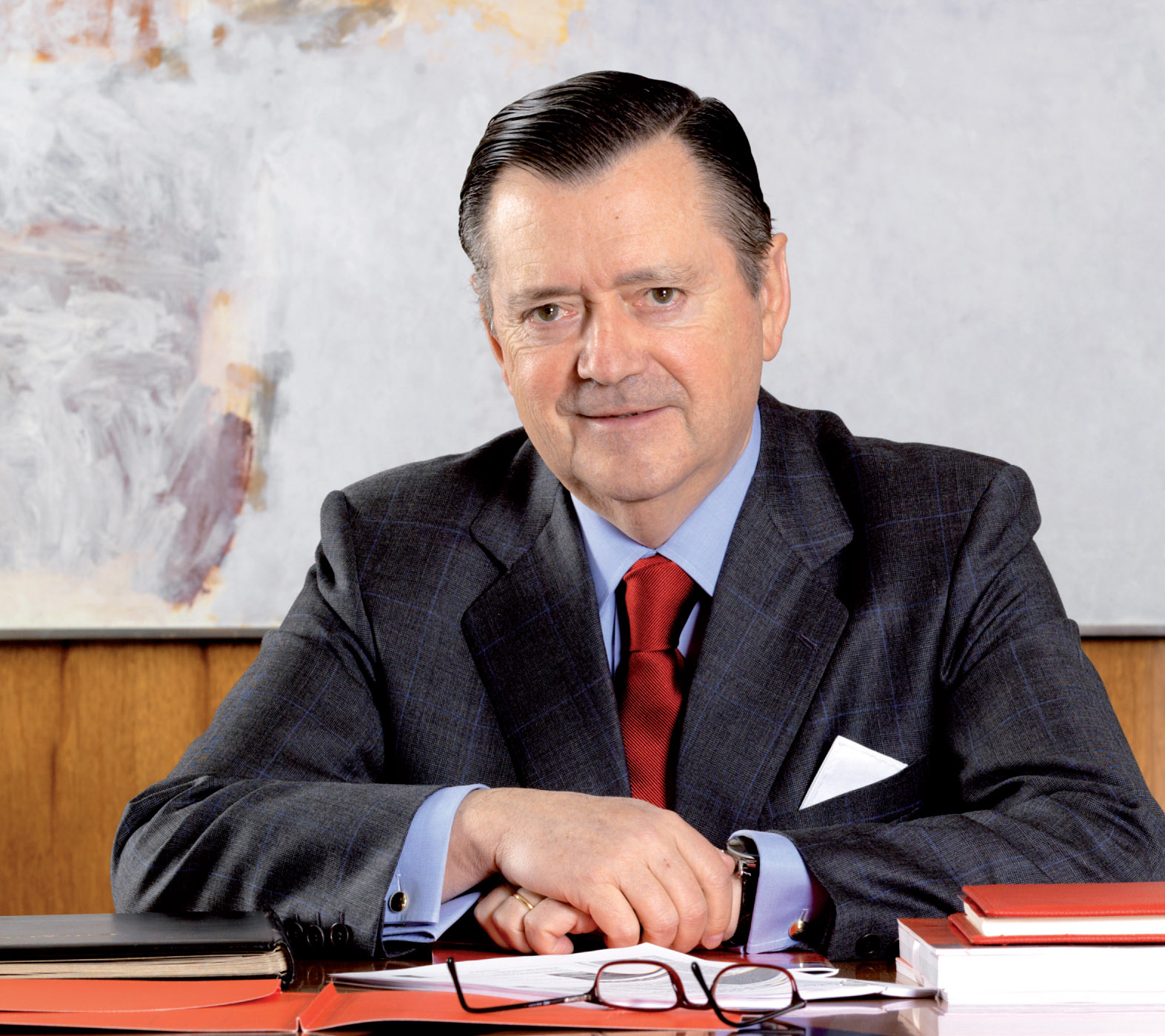
Alfredo Sáenz, CEO Banco Santander

Alfredo Sáenz Abad (born 21 November 1942) is a Spanish businessman who was the CEO and vice-chairman of the Spanish bank Santander Group, the largest bank in the Eurozone and one of the largest banks in the world in terms of market capitalisation. He obtained his degree in law from the University of Valladolid, and in Economics from the Universidad de Deusto, Bilbao.

== Career ==
Sáenz started his career as an executive manager of Tubacex S.A. (1965–1980). After that, he was deputy general manager for Banco de Vizcaya (1981–1983); CEO and chairman for Banca Catalana (1983–1988); CEO and chairman for Banco Bilbao Vizcaya (1988–1993); chairman for Banco Español de Crédito (1993–2002), and first deputy chairman for Inmobiliaria Urbis S.A. (1998–2002)

Sáenz joined Banco Santander in 1994 as a board member. From 2002 until 2013 he was vice chairman and CEO. He resigned as CEO on 29 April 2013, before the Bank of Spain had to make a ruling on the court case from 1994.

During 2012, Alfredo Sáenz was chosen second best CEO in European Banking. That year, during his tenure as CEO, Banco Santander was named 'Best Bank in the world' by the business magazine Euromoney.

Sáenz retired from Banco Santander in 2013. His lump-sum pension payout was reported to be €88 million. The sizeable payout followed his 19-year career with the bank, which saw its global expansion and the quadrupling of its assets to €1.25 trillion. He was replaced by Javier Marín Romano.

In addition to his management work, Sáenz lectured at the University of Deusto from 1965 to 1984. In 1995 he joined the International Academy of Management. From 1997 to 2000 he was on the European Advisory Council of Air Products & Chemicals. In 1999 he was on the International Advisory Board of London Business School. In 2000 he became Chair of the European Financial Management & Marketing Association.

In February 2016, he was appointed president of the BDK Financial Group which controls the Bank of Dakar, headquartered in the capital of Senegal. On 8 March 2016 Sáenz acquired 5% of the shares of the BDK Financial Group, which was created by Alberto Cortina.

Sáenz is a Director of the Foundation Conde de Barcelona, the Foundation Empresa y Sociedad, the Foundation Cruz Roja Española, and the Foundation Ayuda Contra la Drogadicción.

== Accolades ==
1998: Alfredo Sáenz was awarded the Spanish government's Gold Medal (Medalla de Oro al Mérito en el trabajo) for his work.

2006: Alfredo Sáenz received the Manager Award 2006, awarded by the consulting firm AT Kearney, in the form of best manager in financial institutions.

2012: Alfredo Saenz was chosen the second best CEO of European banks. The accolade was awarded by 1,470 analysts from 150 companies, who participated in Institutional Investor magazine's annual ranking.

== Banned ==
In 2011, the Supreme Court of Spain gave Sáenz a three-month ban from working as a banker, after a long legal action. He was convicted in 2009 of false accusations against presumed debtors to Banesto, now a Santander subsidiary, who were briefly jailed over the affair in 1994. Santander said he would appeal the decision, and that Sáenz would continue in his job.

If the crime stood as convicted, he would lose his job; CEOs in Spain must be of good moral repute. On account of this, the authorities converted his prison sentence to a pardon, and replaced it with a lower penalty, in the form of a nominal fine.

However, in February 2013, the Spanish Supreme Court ruled that the Spanish government had overstepped its authority in pardoning him. The Bank of Spain then opened new proceedings in the case.

Sáenz retired from Banco Santander in 2013, cutting off the possibility of his being banned from the Spanish banking industry.

== Pay ==
According to Forbes.com, in 2007 Sáenz had a salary of €3 million, with a bonus of €5.5 million and additional earnings of just under €0.9 million for a total "compensation" of €9.6 million. In 2009, his total compensation was €10.2 million.

== See also ==
- Bank fraud
- Enric Duran
- Libor scandal
- White-collar crime
