= Pedro Cortina Mauri =

Spanish politician and diplomat

Pedro Cortina y Mauri

Pedro Cortina y Mauri (18 March 1908 in La Pobla de Segur – 14 February 1993 in Madrid) was a Spanish politician and diplomat who served as the last Minister of Foreign Affairs under Francisco Franco between 1970 and 1975 and the first one with democracy until 1980. He had been Ambassador to France. He is the father of the famous businessmen Alfonso and Alberto Cortina. His wife died in 1976.

== Professional life ==
Pedro Cortina Mauri started his career as Doctor in Law at the University of The Hague and University of Madrid. He then joined the Spanish Government with Franco to help establish the first relationships of the new government with France as Ambassador of Spain in Paris until 1970.

In 1970, he became the last Minister of Foreign Affairs with General Franco, a position that he continued in when democracy arrived to Spain in 1975. He continued in this position until 1980. Among the key issues he handled were the decolonisation of Mauritania by Spain negotiated together with the US and the decolonisation of Equatorial Guinea.

In 1957, he established the Spanish beer San Miguel (Fábricas de Cerveza y Malta, SA - a licensing agreement with the original Filipino San Miguel Beer brand) where he was chairman and CEO at the time of his death. San Miguel was then passed to his sons Alfonso and Alberto, who later sold it on to become a component of the Mahou-San Miguel Group in 2000.

== Recognitions ==
Among others he received the following recognitions:

- Grand Cross of the Order of Charles III
- Grand Cross of the Order of Isabella the Catholic
- Grand Cross of the Order of Saint Raymond of Peñafort
- Grand Cross of the Order of Civil Merit
- Grand Cross of the Order of Military Merit, with White Decoration
- Gold Medal of the Senate
- Gold Medal of the Army
- Chevalier de la Légion d'honneur
