= Banco Español de Crédito =

Spanish financial services corporation

Banco Español de Crédito, S.A.

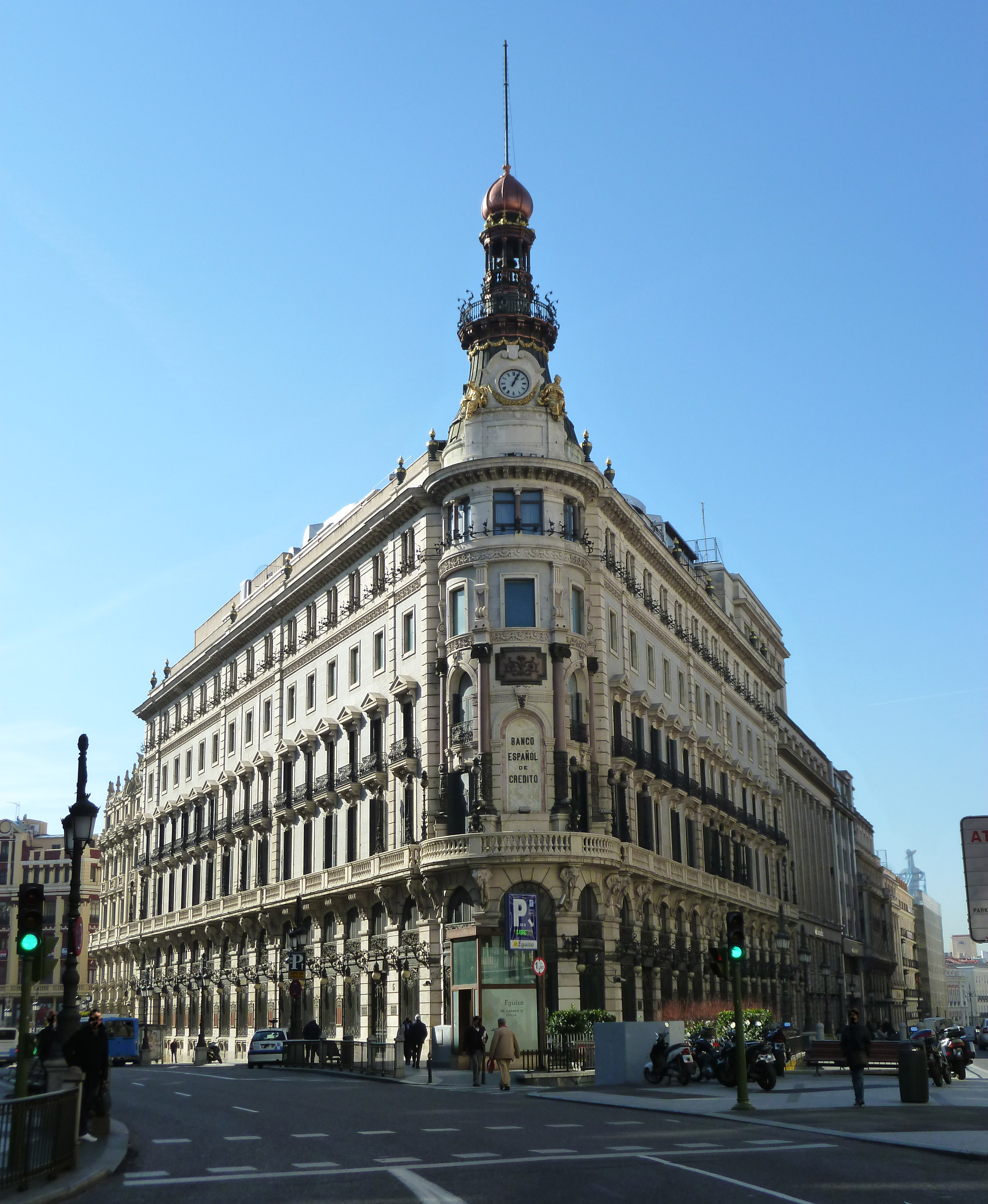
- The former Banesto headquarters in Calle de Alcalá
- Type: Sociedad Anónima
- ISIN: ES0113440038
- Industry: Financial services
- Founded: 1902
- Fate: Intervened by Government of Spain due to Banesto Scandal (1993); Absorbed into Banco Santander (2012)
- Headquarters: Madrid, Spain
- Key people: Mario Conde (Former Executive chairman); Antonio Basagoiti (Chairman); José García Cantera (CEO)
- Products: Retail, business and wholesale banking
- Revenue: ▼€2.562 billion (2009)
- Operating income: ▼€891.6 million (2009)
- Net income: ▼€559.8 million (2009)
- Total assets: ▼€126.2 billion (2009)
- Total equity: ▼€5.473 billion (2009)
- Number of employees: ▼8,905 (2009)
- Parent: Banco Santander
- Website: banesto.es

Banco Español de Crédito, S.A. (Spanish pronunciation: [ˈbaŋko espaˈɲol de ˈkɾeðito]), "Spanish Credit Bank") better known as Banesto, was a Spanish multinational financial services company. Prior to the Spanish Government's historical intervention in 1993, the first in the history of banking, Banesto was the third-largest financial group in Spain, operating around 1,770 branches, as well as the fifth-largest company of the IBEX 35. The ambitious capital increase planned in 1993 by its Executive chairman Mario Conde together with J.P. Morgan became the biggest restructuring plan in the history of Europe, involving asset sales and a rights issue of US$1.2 billion, after which Banesto was expected to become the largest financial firm in Europe. Although initially accepted by the Bank of Spain, it was later frustrated following intervention on the basis of financial transparency.

In October 1987, Mario Conde and Juan Abelló became major shareholders of Banesto. Soon after, on 30 November, Conde was appointed as the Executive Chairman, serving from 16 December 1987 to 29 December 1993. With a patrimonial hole in Banesto tentatively estimated at €3.6 billion (equivalent to roughly US$7.2 billion today) on 28 December 1993, Luis Carlos Croissier, the President of the Comisión Nacional del Mercado de Valores, the financial regulator of the national securities markets, decided to impose a trading halt on Banesto, and Luis Ángel Rojo, the Governor of the Bank of Spain, communicated the intervention of the banking entity, tasking Alfredo Sáenz Abad with chairing the board of directors of Banesto in a temporary basis. Conde, who stayed in preventive detention from December 1994 to January 1995, faced a trail of judicial problems. He was sentenced to 10 years in prison in March 2000 by the Audiencia Nacional (raised to 20 years in 2002 by the Supreme Court). He served 11 years before being paroled.

After the intervention, the team of managers from BBV, headed by Alfredo Sáenz, assumed initial control of the bank and was responsible for executing a sanitation plan. On 25 April 1994, Banco Santander gained control of the bank by winning an auction put forward by the Bank of Spain, thus becoming the largest Spanish financial group. It offered 313.5 billion pesetas (US$2 billion), which meant an offer of 762 pesetas per share, compared to the 667 pesetas offered by BBV and 566 of Argentaria.

In 2012, Santander announced it would absorb Banesto and rebrand all of its divisions and offices.

Outside of Spain, Banesto became well-known as the sponsor of the cycling team that featured Miguel Indurain, the first rider to win five consecutive Tour de France. The team is currently known as Movistar Team.

== History ==
Banco Español de Crédito is rooted in a French-owned banking company which, promoted by Isaac Pereire, was established in Madrid on 28 January 1856, under the new Credit Companies Law, bearing the name of Sociedad de Crédito Mobiliario Español. The company was primarily dedicated to covering the budget deficit of the Government of Spain, through acquisitions of public debt, and the granting of financial credits to public companies.

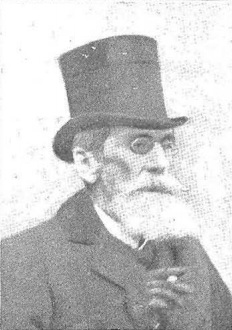
Cayetano Sánchez Bustillo, first Chairman of Banesto, 1908

After the Spanish–American War, the financial reforms of Raimundo Fernández Villaverde of 1900 and with the repatriation of the capitals of the former American colonies, the shareholders decide to liquidate the company and establish a new one, the Credit Bank of Spain, on 1 May 1902, with a capital stock of 20 million pesetas represented by 80,000 shares with a nominal value of 250 pesetas. The bank's promoter was a French group chaired by Gustavo Pereire, administrator of the Company of the Iron Roads of Northern Spain. This initiative was joined by Cayetano Sánchez Bustillo and León Cocagne (deputy director of Banco Hipotecario de España) on behalf of a group of Spanish investors. The first headquarters, the Building of the Furniture Credit Society, was located in Paseo de Recoletos, Madrid.

From 1940, Banesto began an expansion and absorption process of other entities that placed it amongst the most prominent Spanish banks. In 1955, Banesto acquired Banco de Vitoria, which it maintained as a subsidiary until its full integration in 2003, and in 1978 it acquired Banco Coca, then chaired by Ignacio Coca.

Former logo of Banesto

Banesto acquired Banco del Pacífico in 1991 and integrated it. In 1993 it bought Banco de Concepción, but the merger was suspended when the Bank of Spain intervened in Banesto. When Banco Santander acquired Banesto in 1994, they sold Banesto Uruguay, Chile, and Banco Shaw in Argentina. Banesto Chile was sold to Banco Hipotecario de Fomento de Chile (BHIF). In 1998 BBVA bought BHIF.

Ana Patricia Botín, daughter of Santander president Emilio Botín, served as executive chair of the bank between 2002 and November 2010, when she moved to the position of CEO of Santander UK.

The Santander Group announced in December 2012, that it would purchase the remaining 10% of Banesto that it does not currently own, and will merge the business with the existing Banco Santander business in Spain.

== 1993 crisis and intervention ==
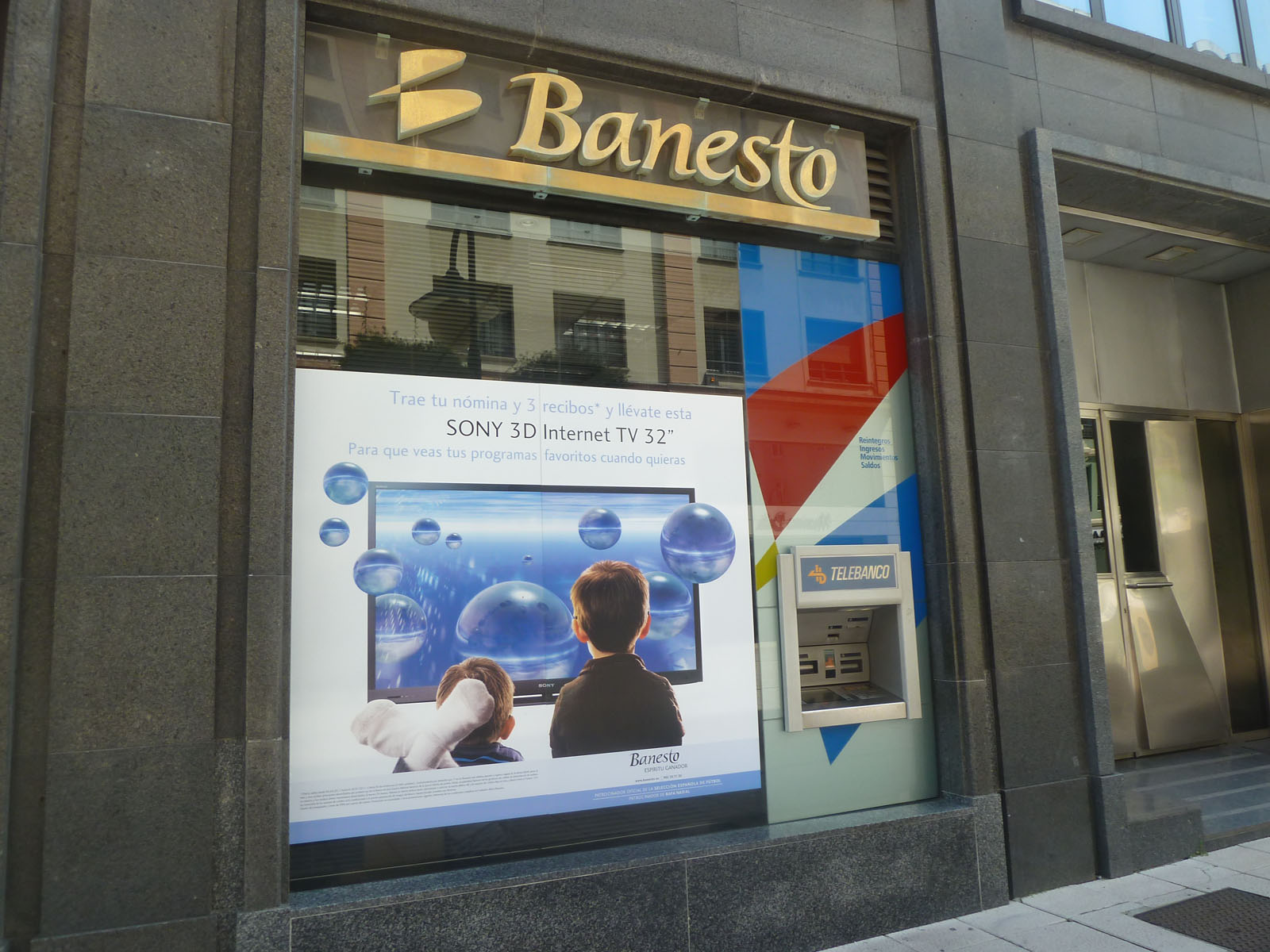
A Banesto branch in Oviedo, Spain

In December 1993, the Spanish National Stock Exchange Commission (Comisión Nacional del Mercado de Valores) suspended trading shares in Banesto following a fall in value estimated between 6.56% and 6.8% from 2,135 to 1,995 Spanish pesetas and sharp increases in loan delinquencies observed by the Spanish government in the previous quarter, Quarter three of 1993.

Alfredo Pastor, then-Secretary of The State for the Economy stated that inspectors from the Bank of Spain had concluded that Banesto lacked resources to cover liabilities and that the management of the bank wasn't able to secure the necessary financing to remedy the situation. In addition to its suspension, the Spanish government removed its chairman Mario Conde, replacing him with a board containing representatives of five other private banks: BBV, (now BBVA), BCH (now Santander), Argentaria (now a part of BBVA), Santander and Popular (now Santander)

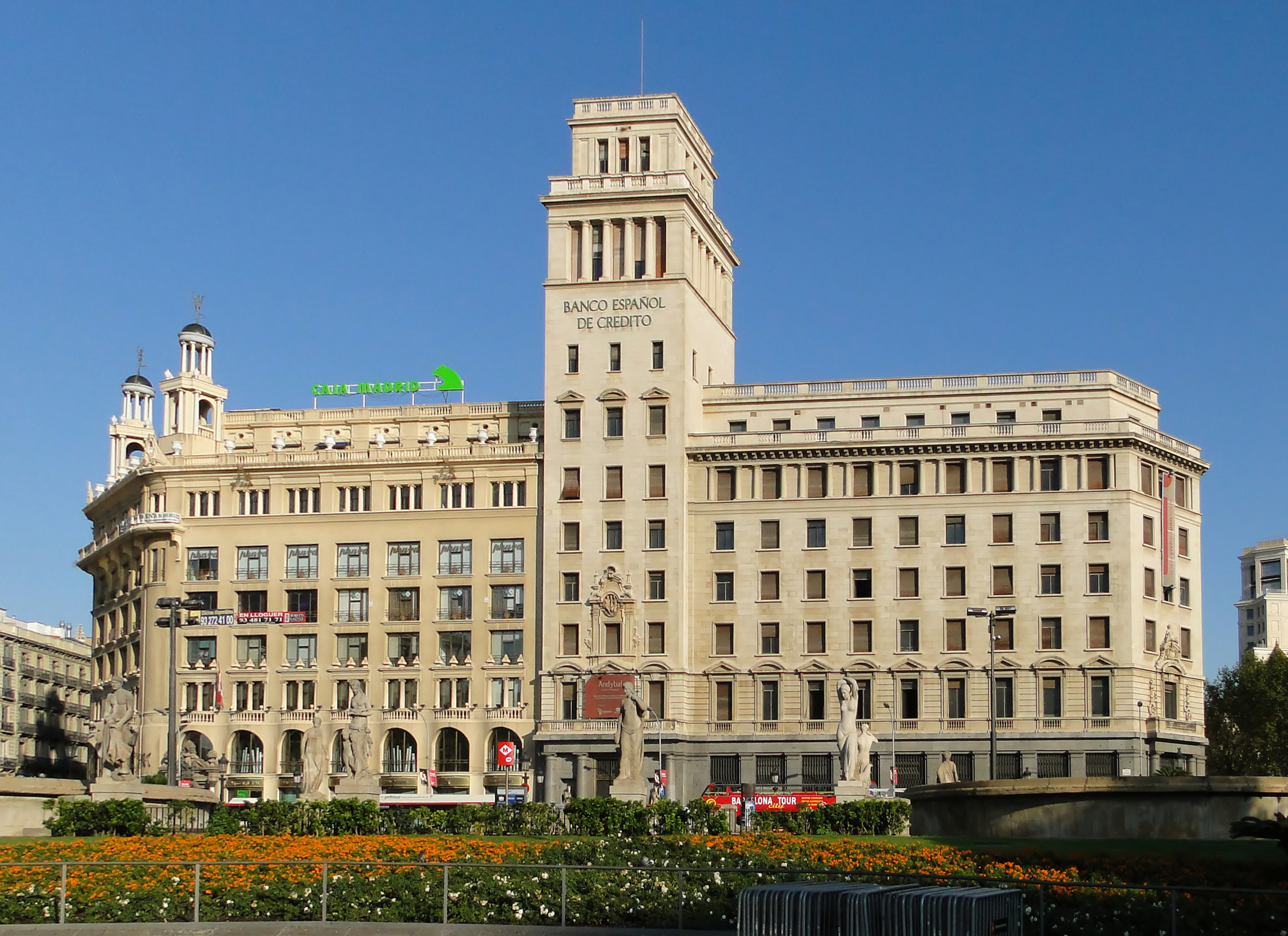
Banco Español de Crédito on Plaça de Catalunya, Barcelona

According to The New York Times, the bank was also forced to admit it was directing profits and revenue from some sales of assets into reserves for losses from loans. The Spanish newspaper El País dubbed the shortfall in financial resources a "hole", which has had varying estimates. The British newspaper The Independent cited the shortfall as 605 billion Pesetas equating to $7.1 billion as of January 2019 (£5.6bn).

== Chairmen ==
- 1902–1906 Cayetano Sánchez Bustillo
- 1906–1913 Manuel González Longoria
- 1913–1927 The Marquess of Alhucemas
- 1927–1933 The Marquess of Cortina
- 1933–1960 Pablo Garnica y Echevarría
- 1960–1970 The Marquess of Deleitosa
- 1970–1984 José María Aguirre de Gonzalo
- 1984–1988 Pablo Garnica y Mansi
- 1988–1993 Mario Conde Conde
- 1993–2002 Alfredo Sáenz Abad
- 2002–2010 Ana Patricia Botín y Sanz de Sautuola
- 2010–2013 Antonio Basagoiti y García-Tuñón

== Banesto Golf Tour ==
Starting in 2009, Banesto sponsored a women's golf mini-tour with eight events, all in Spain. The tour in 2010 is scheduled for seven events.

== See also ==
- Palacio del Duque de Arión
- List of banks in Spain
