= Ramón de Carranza =

Ramón de Carranza is a name, and may refer to:

- Ramón de Carranza y Fernández Reguera, Spanish sailor, war hero, spymaster, and politician
- Ramón de Carranza Gómez, son of the above, businessman, sailor, farmer and President of Sevilla FC
- Ramón de Carranza Trophy, Association football exhibition tournament held in Spain, named after the senior Ramón de Carranza
- Estadio Ramón Carranza, the former name of Estadio Nuevo Mirandilla, named after the senior Ramón de Carranza
