= Montreal spy ring =

Spanish Empire spy ring in Canada during Spanish-American War

The Montreal spy ring was a spy ring of the Spanish Empire that operated in Montreal, Quebec during the Spanish–American War commanded by Ramón de Carranza y Fernández Reguera and Juan Dubosc. Its intention was to collect intelligence on the United States. The ring briefly operated out of the Windsor Hotel before being forced to relocate to a house on Tupper Street. Despite the fact that this spy ring only briefly existed, it had an outsized impact on the intelligence field and espionage. George A. Downing, a member of the ring, was the first spy recruited from within the Department of the Navy to spy on the United States. However, he was never tried; two days after he was apprehended, he was found hanging from the bars of his prison cell's window.

The Montreal spy ring was broken mostly by an emergency "special force" of the Secret Service under the command of John Wilkie. The spy ring was only broken, however, with the assistance of the Canadian government and the US diplomatic corps. This case also built the early career of Secret Service agent William J. Burns, who would later become the director of the FBI. Although this success was widely celebrated in the press at the time, it also masked the controversial nature of the force's methods, which included detentions without trial, unauthorized searches, interference with private correspondence, and the selective leaking of sensitive information for political purposes.

== Origins during the Cuban War of Independence ==
=== Spanish legation at Washington, D.C. ===
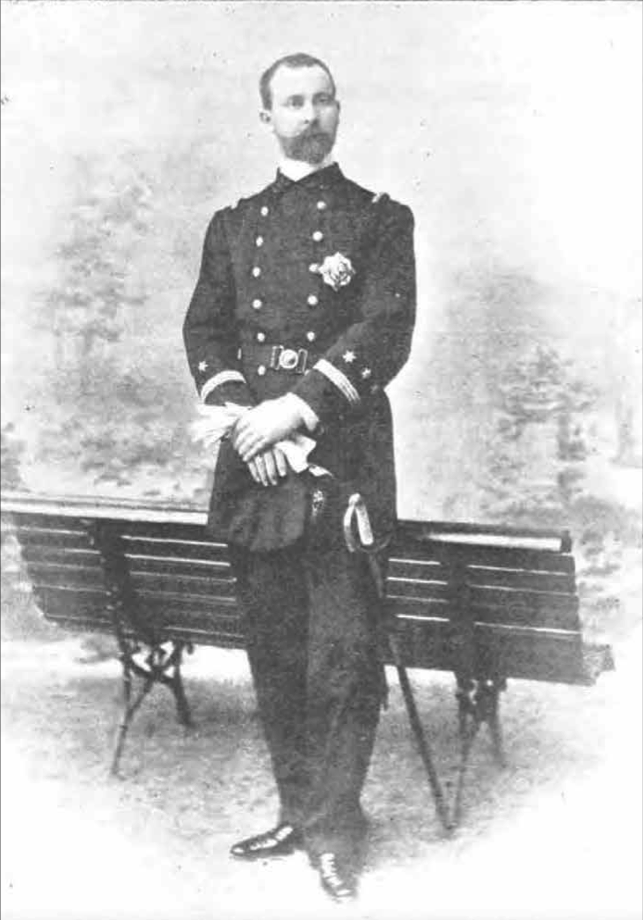
Ramón de Carranza, the war hero and reluctant master spy. Many Spaniards today only know him as the former namesake of a football pitch.

The central figure in the Montreal spy ring was Ramón de Carranza, a lieutenant in the Spanish Navy. Carranza, then in his mid-thirties, was a career naval officer known for his skill with both sword and pistol. Before his period of diplomatic service, he had commanded a gunboat in Spanish Cuba. In 1896, during Cuban War of Independence, Carranza had also led several landing assaults against Cuban insurrectionists. In the Spanish naval operation at Río de San Juan on October 15, 1896, surrounded on all sides and outnumbered, he performed actions which earned him two Crosses of Military Merit and the Military Naval Order of Maria Christina.

In March 1898, he was requested to deliver to Washington, D.C. the report of the Spanish Naval Commission that investigated the loss of the battleship USS Maine in Havana Harbor. The commission's official report found that the cause of the explosion was most likely an "interior cause." Expecting to be returned to service at sea, he was immediately seconded to the Spanish Embassy at Washington, and assigned to the Spanish Empire office of Naval Intelligence.

Officially, Carranza was assigned the position of Naval Attaché, a positing traditionally used by many nations as a diplomatic cover for intelligence coordination since the late nineteenth century. He did not enjoy the assignment, believing himself better suited as a sailor. He maintained strong ties within the Spanish Admiralty and requested to participate directly in naval combat. He grew frustrated at being confined to intelligence duties, believing that Spain's chances of success depended on active engagement at sea rather than covert operations. Nevertheless, he performed his duties despite the hindrances of what he would later call the ineptitude of his superiors.

As the unofficial director of Spanish naval intelligence in Washington, Carranza relied heavily on Spanish immigrant networks in the United States. Communities in Tampa, Key West, New Orleans, and Mobile provided potential recruits and logistical support for intelligence and propaganda operations. Pro-Spanish sympathizers in those cities had allegedly raised funds to purchase a small warship for Spain and to conduct reconnaissance of American naval installations along the Atlantic coast. US field operatives also reported sightings of suspected Spanish agents as far west as San Francisco, allegedly engaged in surveillance of military facilities in the Bay Area. American intelligence later reported that Segismundo Bermejo, Spain's Minister of the Navy, had authorized plans to sabotage U.S. naval bases on both coasts. There were also fears that Spanish agents had infiltrated the U.S. Army and might reveal troop movements.

=== Challenge to a duel ===
Enrique Carlos de la Casa.

As diplomatic conditions between the United States and Spain worsened, and the phenomenon of yellow journalism was stoking the fury of the American public toward war, General Fitzhugh Lee, the former U.S. Consul-General in Havana, and Captain Charles D. Sigsbee, the former commander of the USS Maine, provided testimony before congressional committees in which they expressed the view that Spanish naval officers might have been responsible for the destruction of the Maine.

Believing this to be a direct insult to the honor of Spain's naval service, Carranza sought permission from the Spanish Minister, Luis Polo de Bernabé – successor to Enrique Dupuy de Lôme – to issue formal dueling challenges to both Lee and Sigsbee. Bernabé forbade the act while Carranza remained an accredited diplomat, trying to maintain the reputation of the Spanish legation.

However, only shortly afterward, in April, conditions had worsened so much that the Spanish Embassy began preparing to evacuate its staffs to Canada, which was a neutral country. Bernabé agreed that that the challenges could proceed once relations between the two nations were severed. With the assistance of Captain de la Casa, the Spanish military attaché, Carranza prepared two letters of challenge, written in the formal language of dueling. A similar letter was sent to Captain Sigsbee, differing only in minor details. Both challenges were dispatched on April 20, 1898, when diplomatic relations between the United States and Canada were officially severed and the State Department granted the Spanish legation official passports. Carranza told members of the press that if Lee and Sigsbee wanted to take him up on the offer, they could find him in Canada.

== History ==
=== Initial set-up in Toronto ===
On April 21, 1898, the United States officially declared war on Spain, officially beginning the Spanish–American War. Spain strengthened its diplomatic presence in Canada by upgrading its consular posts in key Atlantic ports. New appointments included Joaquín Torroja in Halifax and Pedro Arias y Solís in Quebec City, both experienced diplomats who had previously served as Spanish consuls in Philadelphia and Tampa. On the Pacific coast, Spain also dispatched a young operative, Ángel Cabrejo, to Victoria, British Columbia. Cabrejo posed as a guardian to his sister, who claimed to be a student, but his true purpose was to observe maritime movements through the Strait of Juan de Fuca, the main approach to Puget Sound Naval Shipyard and the Esquimalt Royal Navy Dockyard.

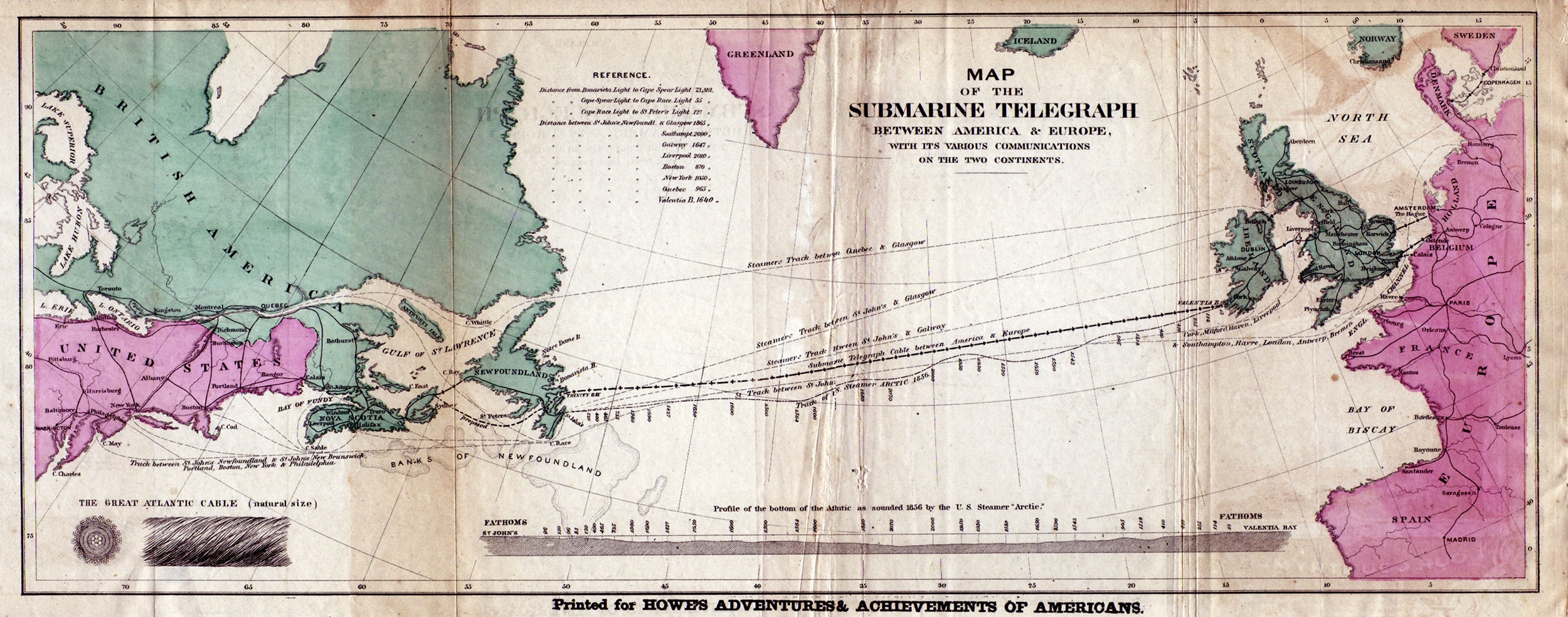
Map of the first Transatlantic submarine cable, from 1858.

Many members of the Spanish legation returned to Spain. However, Bernabé, Carranza, and their staffs in Washington boarded trains bound for Canada. Canada offered a number of advantages that made it an appealing base of operations for Spanish diplomats and intelligence officers. One key factor was the country's direct telegraphic and undersea cable connections to Europe, which provided a secure alternative to the U.S.-controlled communication lines that Spanish officials distrusted.

After leaving Washington, Bernabé and his staff traveled by express train to Buffalo and crossed into Canada at Niagara Falls. According to The Mail and Empire of Toronto, Bernabé immediately began sending and receiving a large volume of telegraphic messages upon his arrival on Canadian soil. Among his principal concerns was the safety of Spanish nationals employed in the cigar industry in Tampa, Florida, who were vulnerable to anti-Spanish sentiment following the destruction of the Maine.

As a result of Carranza's recent publicity, the Secret Service offered its "protection services" to the Spanish legation so that they would not be accosted on their journey. Secretly, they had been tasked by John Wilkie to observe their movements and collect intelligence. Four detectives were assigned to observe their movements, two openly and two covertly.

From Toronto, Bernabé informed Spain's Minister of State, Pío Gullón, that contact with Spanish authorities in Cuba could still be maintained through the Spanish consulate in Kingston, Jamaica. Small schooners were reportedly operating between Jamaica's northern coast and Santiago de Cuba to facilitate communications and transport under wartime conditions.

=== Setting up at the Windsor ===
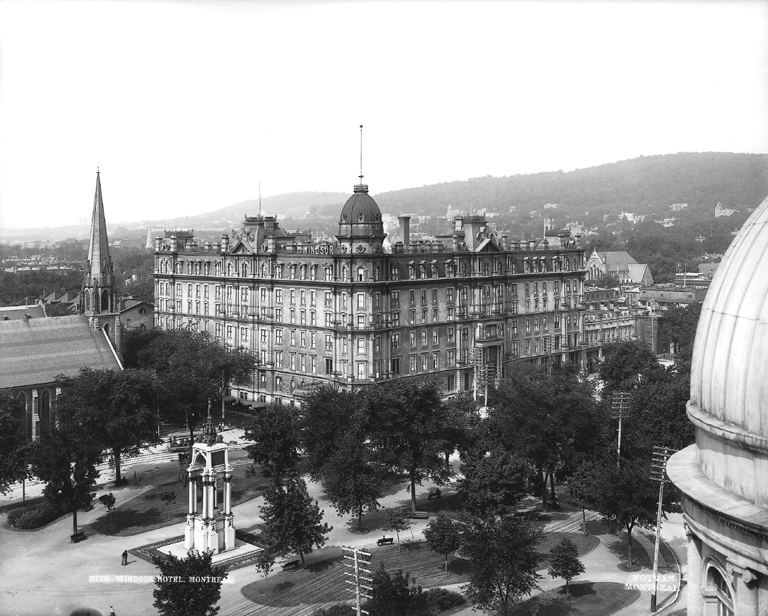
The Montreal spy ring was initially headquartered out of the Windsor Hotel.

Although Spain received polite denials of intelligence support from other European powers, its leaders continued to hope for sympathy from Catholic and monarchist circles abroad. The city of Montreal was the cultural epicenter of predominately Catholic French Canada. As the capital of Quebec, it was also the principal railway hub of Canada's railway system in 1898. Montreal offered convenient connections to New York, Halifax, and the Pacific coast. Its location also allowed for observation of shipping traffic moving between the Great Lakes and the Atlantic Ocean. In addition, the city's concentration of corporate headquarters and government offices enabled discreet contact with influential figures. For these reasons, Montreal emerged as the natural center of Spanish diplomatic and intelligence activity in Canada during the conflict.

Montreal already hosted a Spanish consulate general, headed by Eusebio Bonilla Martel, which provided a legitimate diplomatic base of activity. Toronto, by contrast, had only a vice-consulate staffed by an English-speaking Canadian, making it less suitable for accommodating personnel from the Spanish legation in Washington without attracting attention.

On 6 May 1898, members of the Spanish legation in Washington, including First Secretary Juan Dubosc and Ramón de Carranza, traveled by train to Montreal. Upon arrival, they took up residence in rooms 126 and 128 of the Windsor Hotel on Dominion Square and began coordinating their activities with Eusebio Bonilla Martel. Despite his objections, Carranza was ordered to establish his headquarters at the Windsor, where his superiors had already set up their offices. Carranza knew this was a bad idea; the hotel wasn't Spanish ground or even under the command and control of Spain, and was open to reservations by members of the public.

The Secret Service reserved the hotel room next door to Carranza, where they drilled holes in the walls and installed listening devices. Whether Carranza knew this is unknown, but in the lobby and the restaurant of the hotel, he was being monitored constantly by British, American, and Canadian intelligence officers. Not only that, the Spanish legation were being pursued by members of the Canadian press. There were also several Carlist agents staying here, monitoring the activities of the monarchist legation. There were so many intelligence officers in this hotel that they were literally "tripping over each other in the hallways."

=== George Downing, "the first Navy spy" ===
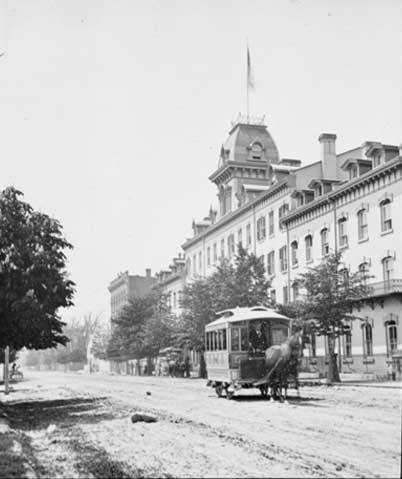
Downing met with Carranza at the Queen's Hotel in Toronto.

George A. Downing was a 33-year-old commissary yeoman who had recently been honorably discharged from the United States Navy. The position of commissary yeoman involved managing provisions and mess operations, roughly comparable to a modern logistics specialist. Downing was a naturalized former British subject who had reportedly served as a merchant sailor with P&O and as a crewman aboard a private yacht owned by a wealthy New Yorker.

According to some accounts, Downing had also lived for a period in southern Placer County, California, before joining the Navy, where he served for about seven years, initially aboard the steam sloop USS Mohican on the Pacific coast and later on the cruiser USS Brooklyn in New York City. An acquaintance from California described him as prone to drinking and brawling. Though Downing received an honorable discharge from the Navy in late April 1898, he was not recommended for reenlistment, a decision that reportedly left him embittered. After his discharge, he sought employment at the Washington Navy Yard, anxious about how his service record might affect his job prospects and still drinking heavily.

On May 6, 1898, Downing traveled to Toronto and made contact with Carranza at the Queen's Hotel. Carranza interviewed Downing for over an hour and, persuaded of his sincerity, provided him with roughly $100 (equivalent to over $3,000 today), a cipher for coded correspondence, and an accommodation address in Montreal for the exchange of letters.

Unbeknownst to both men, a Secret Service operative had rented the adjoining room and overheard the conversation in full. When Downing departed the Queen's Hotel, the agent followed him to his lodgings and later traced him back to Washington. Within hours, he visited the Navy Department offices where he obtained minor details about US naval movements.

Ignoring the cipher system provided to him by Carranza, Downing composed an unencrypted letter containing this observations, as well as a promise to gather further intelligence from Norfolk, Virginia. He mailed the letter to the accommodation address arranged by Carranza, but the communication was intercepted almost immediately by postal inspectors of the United States Postal Inspection Service (USPIS). Downing was arrested later that day, May 7, and confined to the brig at the Washington Barracks.

Downing's actions fell under Section 38 of the National Forces Act of 1863. This statute provided that any person found acting as a spy in time of war could be tried by a military commission and, upon conviction, sentenced to death. Two days later, he was discovered dead in his cell, hanging from the bars of his window. Official accounts described the death as a suicide prompted by remorse, though Carranza later suggested that Downing, whom he regarded as one of his two most capable agents, might have been executed extrajudicially.

=== Movement to Tupper Street ===
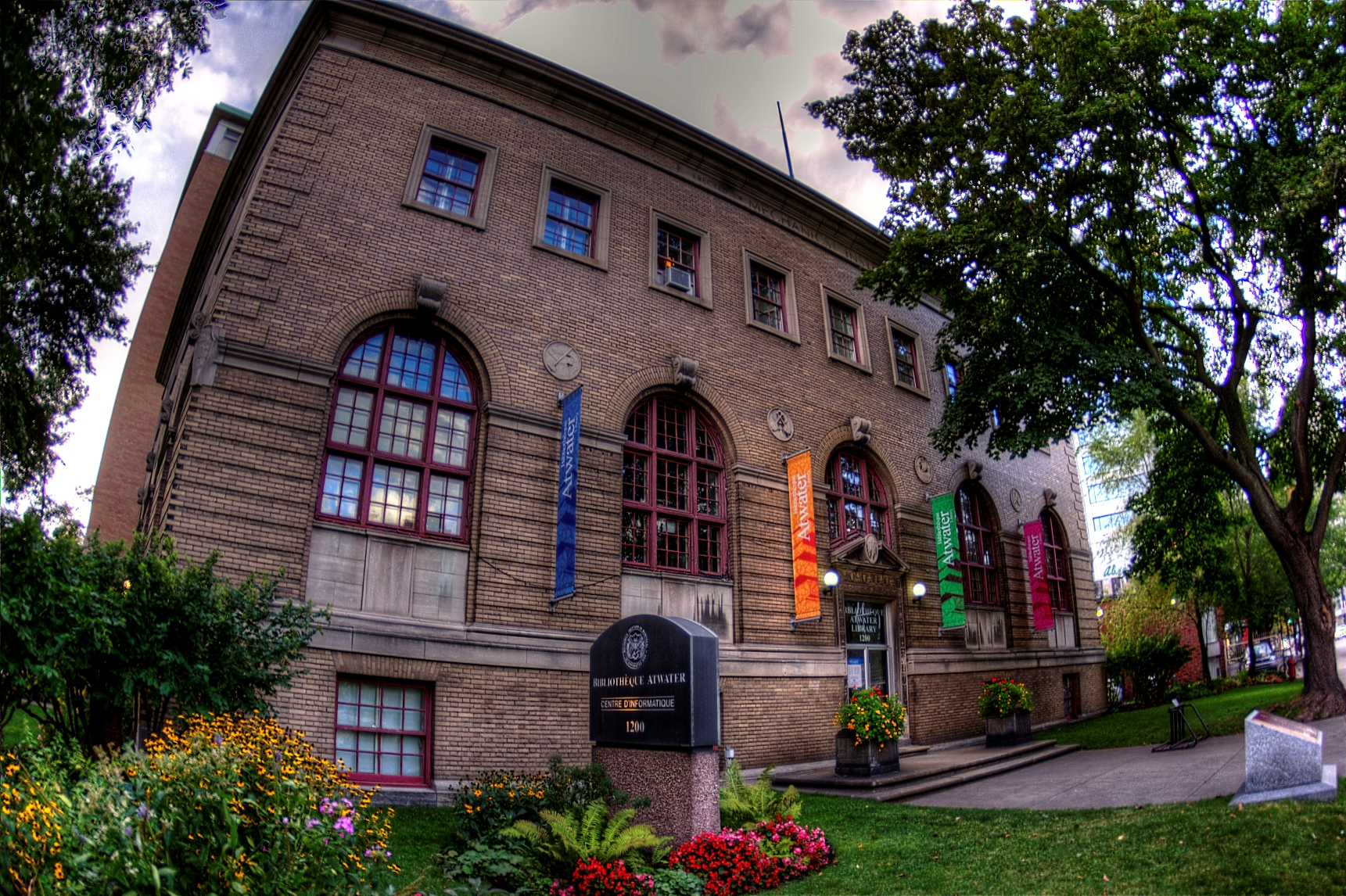
The Atwater Library on the corner of Tupper and Atwater sits near to the house where the operation was relocated.

To obscure his presence, Carranza and several Spanish officials publicly announced their departure for Liverpool, England. When Bernabe and his staff departed for Liverpool on May 21, Carranza and several associates accompanied them. However, during the voyage down the St. Lawrence River, Dubosc, Carranza, and a few of their aides disembarked discreetly and returned to Montreal, where they had rented a residence on Tupper Street, where he resumed his activities.

The Secret Service was already aware of the move. They had earlier intercepted correspondence between a Spanish official in Madrid and Juan Dubosc while the latter was in Toronto. On 28 May 1898, W. A. Wallace of Denver, Colorado, reported to Assistant Secretary of War George D. Meikeljohn that he had overheard a conversation mentioning Dubosc by name. Secret Service files additionally contain a May 21 newspaper article from Montreal stating that although Minister Polo y Bernabé was departing for Spain, Dubosc would remain to direct Spain's intelligence operations in North America.

Carranza and Dubosc also received offers of cooperation from individuals claiming to be willing spies; however, most proved unreliable, being double agents, adventurers, or already known to U.S. counterintelligence. The intelligence sent by encrypted telegrams from Montreal proved more effective. More than seventy such coded messages are known to have survived in the archives of Spain's Ministry of Foreign Affairs.

The network also engaged in disinformation efforts, circulating false reports to mislead the US. Beyond intelligence operations, its agents coordinated a maritime supply effort across the Caribbean. Neutral merchant ships were hired to transport food and medicine to Cuba, where shortages were acute due to the U.S. blockade. Although many of these vessels were seized, at least twenty-two are believed to have broken through successfully, some making multiple trips. These operations sought to undermine the American strategy of forcing Cuba's surrender through starvation – a tactic they had recently used to defeat the Confederates.

A key objective of the network was to provide intelligence for Admiral Cámara's planned expedition against the U.S. coast. To that end, a Spanish consul was appointed in Hamilton, Bermuda. US intelligence uncovered traces of the operation but lacked direct evidence to present to the British government.

Carranza also sought to place informants within the US military by recruiting individuals who could enlist in American units bound for Cuba or the Philippines. Once inside, these agents were expected to gather intelligence on U.S. military deployments before defecting to Spanish lines. In need of experienced soldiers, Carranza turned to a Canadian detective agency for assistance, which introduced him to Frank Arthur Mellor, a former artilleryman from Kingston, Ontario. Carranza continued efforts to collect intelligence of potential value to Spanish military authorities. Among his initiatives was the dispatch of operatives to gather information concerning U.S. coastal defenses and naval strategy.

=== Frank Arthur Mellor ===
Frank Arthur Mellor had a reputation for violence and deceit, as a bigamist and as an aggressive fighter, and quickly exploited his local connections. He persuaded two artillerymen from Kingston to serve as spies for Spain, bribing them while they were intoxicated. One of them, a man named Atkins (also known as Prentor), was instructed to travel to San Francisco and enlist for service in the Philippines. However, after sobering up, Atkins changed his mind and confessed the entire scheme to the US Consul in Kingston on May 11, 1898. Enraged at the betrayal, Mellor attacked Atkins and coerced him into leaving for Liverpool, but the plot was already exposed.

Despite this setback, Spanish intelligence continued to transmit coded messages between Montreal and Victoria, British Columbia, during July 1898, possibly intended for Spanish forces in Manila. US cryptographers were unable to decipher the code, but the confession provided by Atkins was enough to implicate Mellor. Secret Service agents, with the cooperation of Canadian authorities, started a monitoring trace on him.

Mellor later attempted to join the American forces at Tampa, Florida, using the identity of a Montreal barman whose silence had been secured by a woman acting on Mellor's behalf. His application was rejected, but he continued sending information to Carranza. The breakthrough came when Secret Service agents, assisted by Canadian officials, managed to break and enter into Carranza's residence on Tupper Street on May 27 while he was at breakfast. Inside, they found a letter referring directly to Mellor's arrest on May 24, evidence that confirmed his involvement. Mellor was detained shortly thereafter but was neither tried nor released.

On August 12, 1898, ten days after the peace protocol that ended the war, he died of typhoid fever while imprisoned at Fort McPherson.

=== The Carranza Letter ===
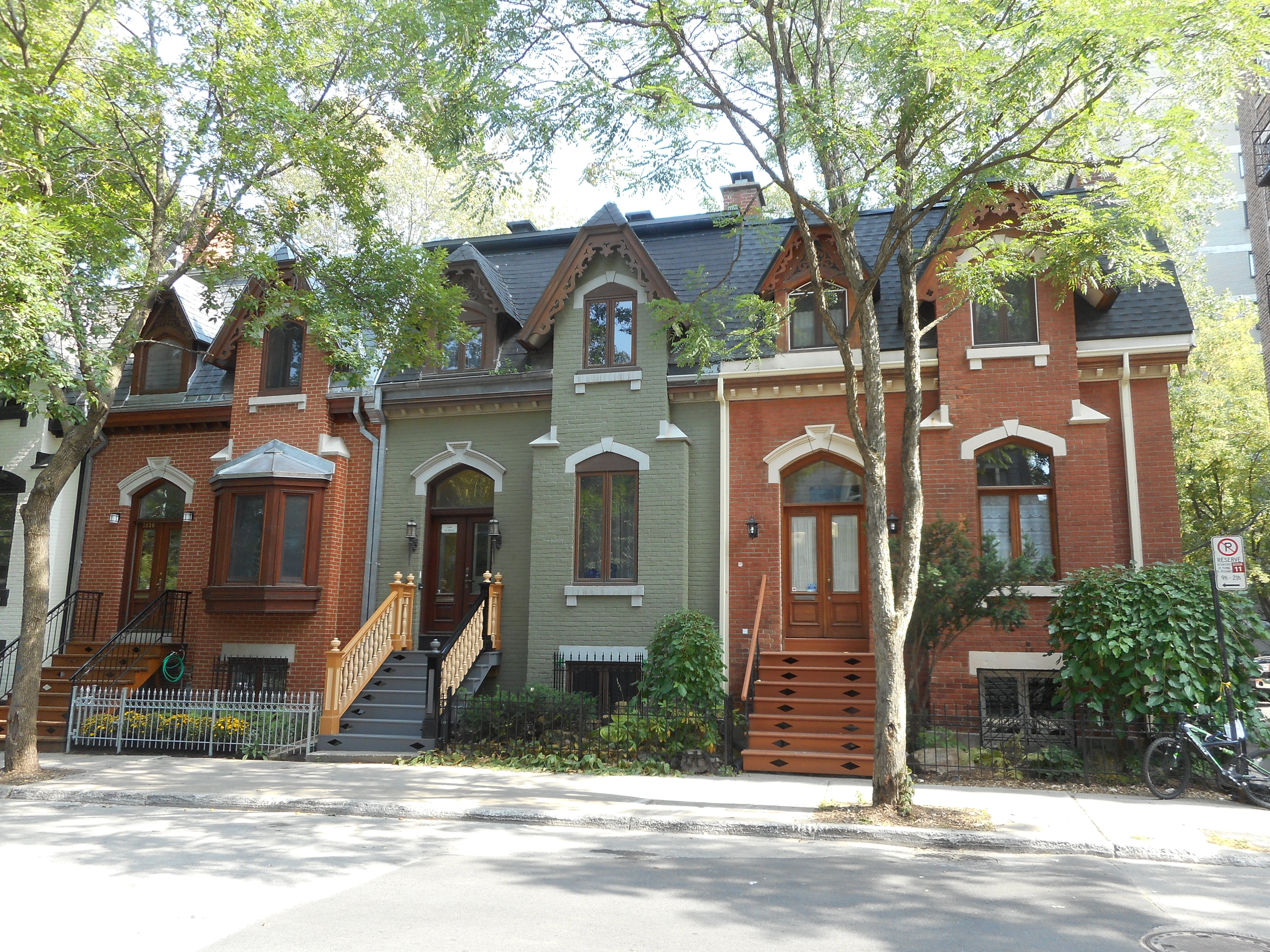
These houses on modern Tupper Street are similar to the style of house that Carranza and Dubosc occupied. However, that original house has been replaced by a skyscraper.

Only a few days after the arrest of Frank Mellor, newspapers reported that Carranza and Dubosc of the "Montreal Spy Bureau at 42 Tupper Street" became alarmed following the theft. Carranza offered a bounty of $1,000 for the letter's return, describing it as highly important. His counsel, H. C. St. Pierre, who had served in the American Civil War, acknowledged that the missing correspondence contained sensitive material and that its disclosure could endanger individuals mentioned within. Despite assurances of police protection, Carranza expressed outrage at the handling of the incident and the loss of the document.

The document, which came to be known as the "Carranza letter," reportedly contained the names of Spanish agents operating in the United States. The letter, addressed from Carranza to Captain Gómez Imaz of the Spanish Ministry of the Navy, was said to describe the intelligence work in Montreal, list American naval movements, and suggest that Spanish forces could launch attacks on Boston, Portland, and Long Island. Local police began a search for the missing letter, but it was believed to have already crossed into American hands.

Montreal's Chief of Detectives, William Kellert, was arrested under suspicion of having taken the letter, as he was rumored to have previously cooperated with U.S. officials. The warrant for his arrest was sworn by Carranza, who alleged that a letter addressed to him had been stolen. Kellert's home and office were searched without result, and he was released after several hours in custody.

Reports indicated that the letter was obtained by a man posing as a prospective tenant, who gained entry to the house while Carranza and his associates were away. This man was later identified as a Secret Service agent known only as "Tracer." Upon returning, Carranza discovered the theft and notified the authorities. Witnesses claimed to have seen the suspect and initially identified Kellert, though he denied involvement. His attorney, R. Greenshields, stated that witnesses could confirm Kellert's innocence and that legal action for false arrest would follow.

When the Carranza Letter arrived in the United States, it was translated into English and released to the press in Washington, though Carranza later claimed the text had been exaggerated. Sir Julian Pauncefote, the British ambassador in Washington, reviewed the document alongside an embassy official fluent in Spanish and affirmed the accuracy of the translation. However, the authenticity of the published letter remains uncertain.

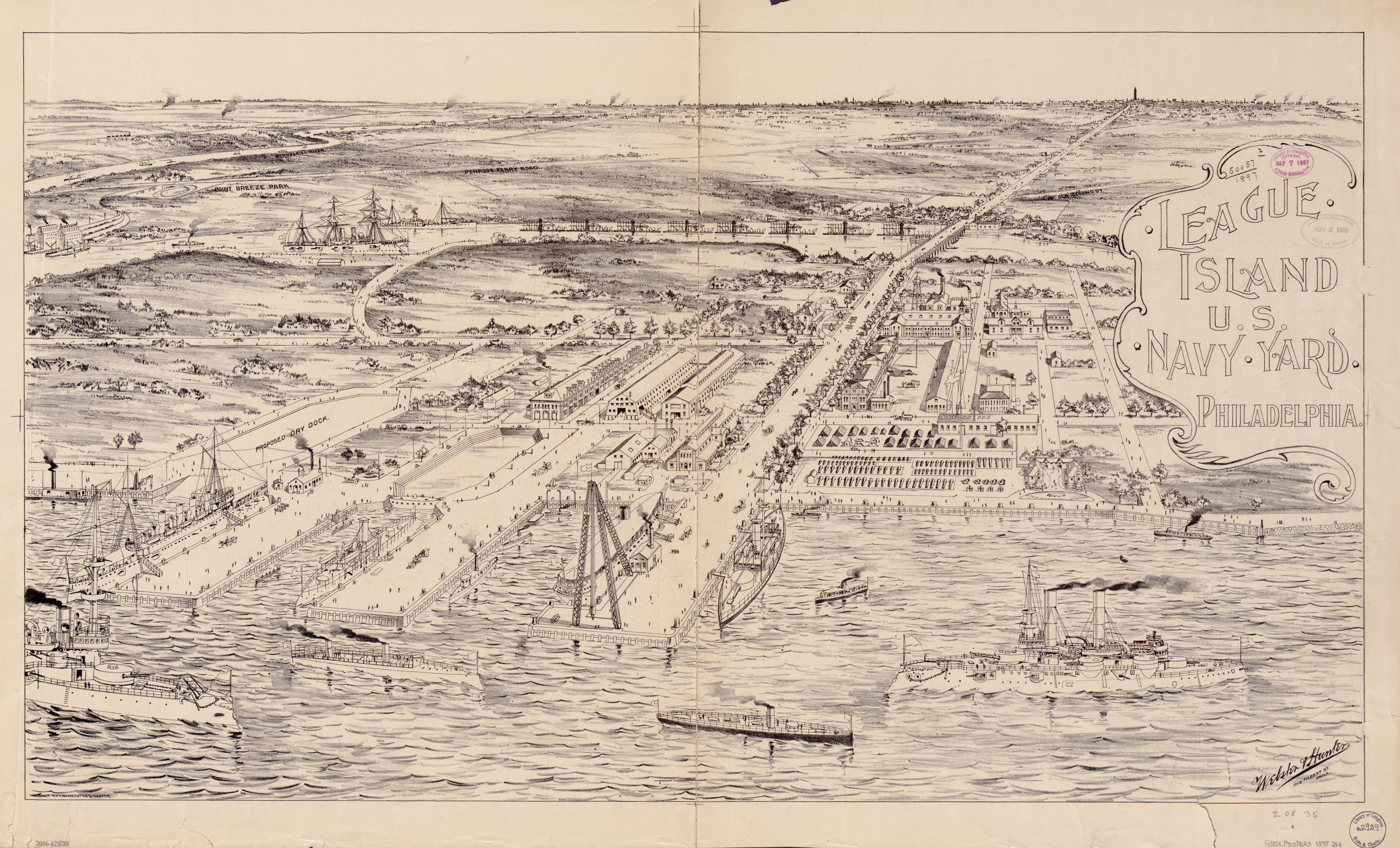
This aerial view of League Island Navy Yard in Philadelphia was drawn in 1897.

Around this time, USPIS intercepted a letter postmarked from Wyncote, Pennsylvania, on 7 June 1898. The correspondence, addressed to Carranza and signed "J. Henry Balfour," referred to earlier communications and contained detailed descriptions of the maritime approaches to Philadelphia. The letter also discussed the challenges of bombarding the city and League Island Navy Yard from the sea, and the potential damage that could be inflicted on its commercial district. Although Balfour's true identity was never established, he was thought to have acted independently of any formal Spanish intelligence network. Despite their efforts, American investigators were unable to determine who the mysterious correspondent was or whether he had any connection to Carranza's wider espionage activities.

The Spanish Ministry of Defense to this day insists that the original contents of the Carranza Letter were destroyed by US intelligence and replaced with a forgery.

=== Expulsion of Carranza and Dubosc ===
The public disclosure of Spanish espionage activities in Canada generated diplomatic repercussions in Madrid, London, Washington, and Ottawa. In response, Dubosc sought to delay official action. He continued to retain the Montreal attorney H. C. St. Pierre to represent his case before Canadian authorities and held a press conference on June 9, 1898, at which he denied any involvement in espionage. Dubosc claimed that he had merely supplied the Spanish government with "news and general information" already available in Canadian newspapers. Given the evidence surrounding Lieutenant Carranza's activities, this assertion was only partially true. Nevertheless, Dubosc warned that any expulsion of Spanish nationals from Canada would constitute a violation of British neutrality.

Despite these protests, Prime Minister Sir Wilfrid Laurier's government, acting on instructions from Colonial Secretary Joseph Chamberlain, ordered both Dubosc and Carranza to leave Canadian territory. Officially, the expulsions were justified as actions consistent with British neutrality, though the decision contrasted with their tolerance of U.S. consuls who used the Rock of Gibraltar as an observation post to monitor Spain's naval movements.

Dubosc remained in Montreal. Carranza, meanwhile, managed to slip away from his Secret Service detail and went underground for some time.

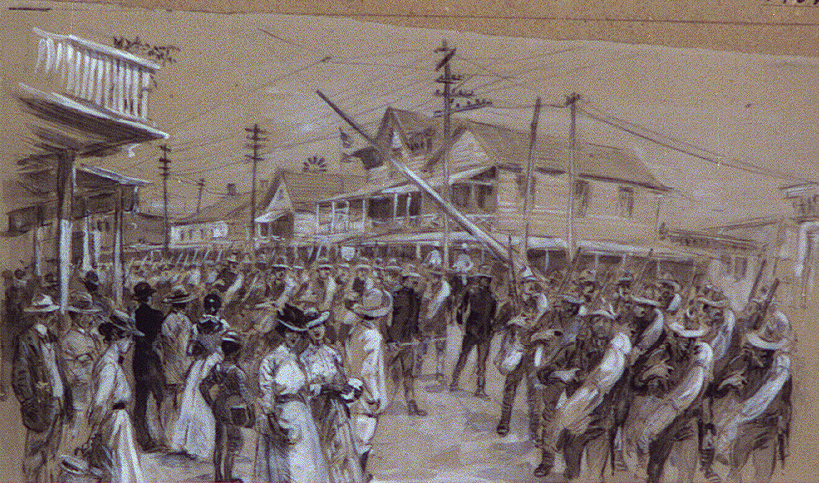
Tampa, Florida served as the primary embarkation point for soldiers deploying to Cuba.

On June 8, Dubosc reported on logistical difficulties faced by the US Army at Tampa, Florida, the principal embarkation point for operations against Cuba, where soldiers were reportedly suffering from heat stroke and pack animals were dying. The following day he informed the Spanish government about Admiral William T. Sampson's naval movements and described the poor condition of American forces, expressing confidence that expulsion from Canada was imminent. "We are surrounded by American spies," he wrote, before continuing his detailed reporting on US ship traffic. He also warned Admiral Pascual Cervera that Admiral Sampson intended to trap his squadron at Santiago de Cuba by sinking a damaged transport ship at the harbor entrance.

Throughout June, Dubosc and Consul-General Eusebio Bonilla exchanged dozens of telegrams with Madrid concerning US troop deployments, naval operations, and strategic plans. By June 21, Dubosc had also established connections within Montreal's business community to locate merchant vessels willing to transport more food and medical supplies to Spanish troops in Cuba and Puerto Rico.

On July 9, the day of his final departure from Canada, he was still active, sending reports to Madrid about attempts to dispatch relief cargoes from Halifax, commenting on the annexation of Hawaii by the United States, and speculating on developments in the Philippines. Before leaving, he ensured that Spanish clandestine work in Canada would continue under the direction of Consul-General Bonilla in Montreal, assisted by the consuls in Halifax and Quebec City, both of whom were considered experienced officers.

After the British expulsion, Dubosc offered his services to Captain-General Ramón Blanco in Havana, while Carranza, rather than returning to Spain, disappeared in Canada—apparently pursuing plans of his own.

=== Eusebio Bonilla Martel assumes command ===
Despite the loss of its principal organizers, the Spanish intelligence network continued to function for the remainder of the war. Its reduced operations focused mainly on smuggling provisions to the besieged island, though the absence of a Spanish fleet made sustained resistance impossible.

Although Carranza and Dubosc had been expelled, Spanish intelligence operations in Canada continued under Consul-General Eusebio Bonilla in Montreal, who remained at his post on legitimate diplomatic grounds. Bonilla's correspondence was secretly monitored by the U.S. Secret Service, which, through a sympathetic employee of the Western Union Telegraph Company, intercepted several of his coded telegrams. These messages were addressed to Spain's representatives on the Pacific coast; Frank Mellor in Vancouver and Ángel Cabrejo in Victoria. However, lacking the cipher key, the American interceptors were unable to decode the contents. Although they speculated on Bonilla's role, they chose not to involve the Canadian authorities. Consequently, Bonilla continued to telegraph reports to Madrid concerning U.S. naval movements, military preparations, and news derived from the American press and other sources.

This intelligence directly influenced Spanish diplomacy. Bonilla protested the passage of the cruiser Gresham to pass from Lake Ontario through the St. Lawrence River to the Atlantic, leading Spain's ambassador in London, the Count of Rascón, to formally accuse Canada of breaching neutrality. Although the protest ultimately failed, Bonilla's reports largely drove Spain's diplomatic efforts.

Bonilla's role expanded, as he received funds for informants, and managed regular duties like aiding Spanish nationals. In Bernabé's absence, Bonilla assumed supervision of Spain's other consular offices in Canada, Bermuda, and the West Indies. Alongside intelligence work, he fulfilled regular consular duties, including the repatriation of Spanish prisoners of war and assistance to Spanish nationals across North America, often with the cooperation of Austrian diplomats.

Carranza, meanwhile, resurfaced in Victoria, British Columbia to purchase a merchant raider and put together a crew that would operate in the Pacific.

The Montreal spy ring represented only a fraction of Spain's wider intelligence presence in North America during the Spanish–American War. Through persuasion or financial incentives, Spain maintained numerous agents within the United States, many of whom had previously been involved in monitoring Cuban revolutionary activity.

Spanish influence extended into unexpected circles. The secretary of the U.S. delegation to the Paris peace negotiations, Mrs. Atkinson, was a Spanish agent, and spies were even said to have been discovered within General Shafter's forces. One such case was that of Sergeant Elmhurst of the 3rd Cavalry, who arranged to be captured by Spanish forces in order to transmit information, identifying himself with a silver ring and the password "white trust."

== History of the Secret Service Special Force ==
=== Origins ===
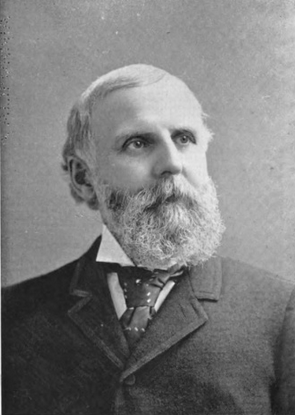
Lyman J. Gage, the 42nd Secretary of the Treasury.

At the end of the nineteenth century, the United States had no centralized intelligence agency, and while Presidents had historically relied on "executive agents" for diplomatic or secret missions abroad, there was no established mechanism for internal espionage. The only real federal investigations at this time were undertaken by the United States Postal Inspection Service, the most powerful law enforcement agency, but their jurisdiction only kicked-in if correspondence was sent through the mail.

The Pinkertons were ruled out due to their tarnished public reputation following the Homestead Strike of 1892 and suspicions that some of their agents were working for Spanish interests. Military intelligence branches within the Army and Navy existed but lacked coordination and did not maintain a permanent general staff. While the Office of Naval Intelligence produced some valuable results gathering information on Spanish naval activities in Cádiz, there was no unified system for domestic or wartime intelligence.

The United States Department of the Treasury, by contrast, offered two key advantages: the Secret Service and the Revenue Cutter Service. The Secret Service had evolved from a Civil War–era intelligence network managed under the War Department by Lafayette C. Baker, originally aimed at countering counterfeiting and subversion. Reorganized under the Treasury after the war, it had spent three decades refining investigative techniques that proved adaptable to espionage and counterespionage. Meanwhile, the Revenue Cutter Service had already been active in intercepting "filibuster" expeditions sent from U.S. ports to support Cuban rebels, making it well-suited to monitor Spanish operations.

After the destruction of the USS Maine, the Treasury Department assumed a central role in coordinating US intelligence. On the advice of Treasury Secretary Lyman J. Gage and Assistant Secretary Frank A. Vanderlip, both former Chicago associates, Secret Service agent John Elbert Wilkie was tasked with organizing a network of agents to collect information and monitor Spanish activity.

=== The Special Force ===
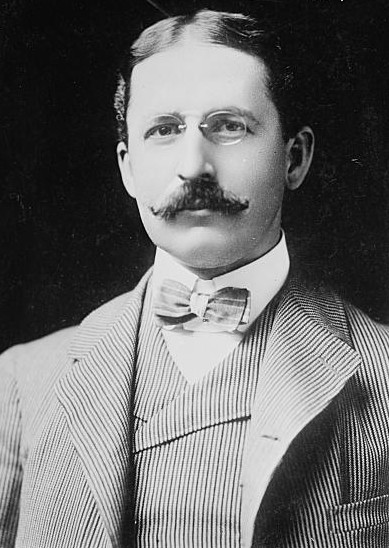
John Elbert Wilkie was appointed as the Chief of the Secret Service, and was the US spymaster during the war.

As head of the Secret Service, John Elbert Wilkie was the leading US intelligence officer during the Spanish–American War. Before entering government service, Wilkie had worked as a financial journalist for the Chicago Tribune and later engaged in business ventures in London involving banking and steamship operations. Returning to Chicago in 1896, he resumed reporting, focusing on crime and investigative journalism, which provided him with practical insight into methods of detection. Although not widely known to the public, Wilkie's relative obscurity likely served operational purposes. He was known for his confidence in his achievements and for his distinct appearance—described in contemporary accounts as bespectacled and sharply dressed. His tenure as head of the Secret Service established him as an early architect of organized American intelligence.

The efficiency of the Secret Service during the war stemmed in part from the close personal relationships among its leadership. Wilkie's connections with Gage and Vanderlip allowed for swift access to President William McKinley and the authorization of secret appropriations. Cooperation extended to other departments such as the Post Office and the War Department, creating a flexible and centralized intelligence network that could provide the administration with continuous surveillance capabilities.

The primary challenge facing Wilkie and his agents lay in assessing the nature and scale of Spanish espionage. Reports circulated suggesting that Spain sought to stir Catholic and monarchist sympathies in North America and that Montreal had become a center of Spanish intrigue. Some rumors, such as claims of Spanish plans to poison U.S. troops or sabotage military installations, proved unfounded. Other threats, however, were substantiated: financial support for Spain flowed through expatriate communities in New Orleans, and intelligence leaks concerning American troop movements and coastal defenses reached the Spanish navy. In New Orleans, specifically, Wilkie had received reports that the Spanish Society was preparing actions against the United States from within its own borders. The Secret Service, under Wilkie's direction, worked to counter these activities through an expanding domestic and international surveillance network that would lay the groundwork for modern American intelligence organization.

=== Illegal activities ===
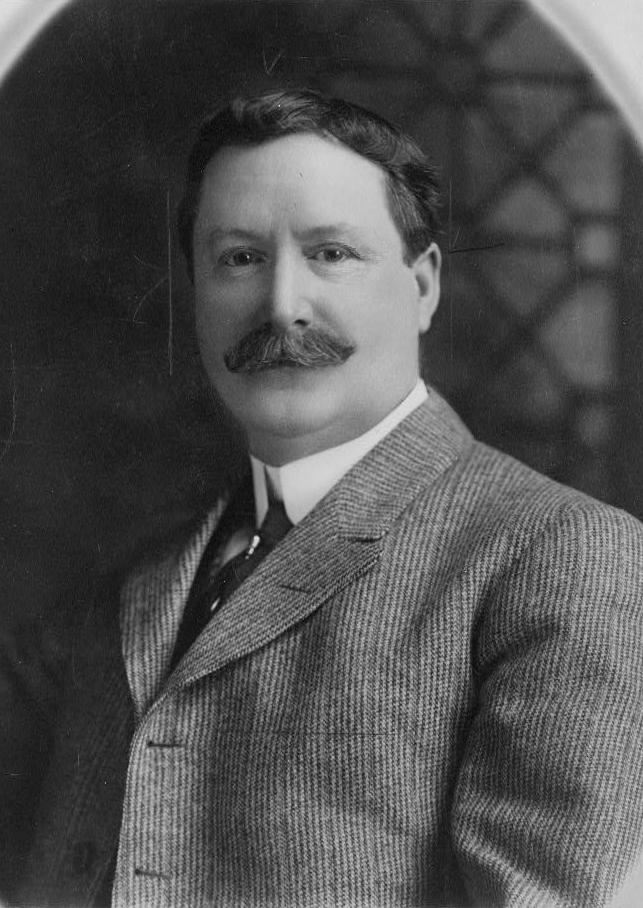
William J. Burns was one of the members of the Special Force in Montreal.

In its zeal to confront perceived Spanish threats, the Secret Service of 1898 operated far beyond its legal mandate, setting precedents that raised enduring questions about the limits of executive authority and the protection of civil liberties during wartime. At the time, the Secret Service's wartime activities were conducted without clear constitutional authorization. The Secret Service had been established solely to suppress counterfeiting, its jurisdiction defined narrowly by the wording of Treasury appropriation laws. Nonetheless, acting on presidential authority, it expanded its mandate to include domestic and foreign espionage during the war with Spain.

Such extralegal actions were tolerated largely because national unity was high and public opposition minimal. The Service's operatives employed methods that violated both US and Canadian law; breaking and entering, stealing correspondence, interfering with the mail, and detaining suspects without due process. Wilkie was prepared to override individual rights in the name of wartime security.

As the Secret Service became a permanent fixture within the federal bureaucracy, further abuses emerged. Political patronage soon influenced appointments and information sharing. Notably, Senator Henry Cabot Lodge reportedly received confidential intelligence from Service personnel about the private and diplomatic activities of his political opponents.

The most extensive activity undertaken by the Secret Service in 1898 was domestic surveillance. Wilkie ordered that approximately six hundred individuals, men and women, be kept under close watch. Such monitoring frequently infringed on privacy rights and disproportionately targeted people of southern European descent or those who spoke Romance languages. This bias reflected broader public suspicions toward Catholic immigrants from Spain and Italy.

In his later writings, Wilkie justified these actions by claiming that "foreigners of anarchistic tendencies" might exploit the war to commit acts of violence against government officials or the public. In practice, this prejudice led to wasted resources and the persecution of innocent individuals. One illustrative case was that of Edward G. Montesi, an Italian-born American citizen. Montesi, who had immigrated at age fourteen and was by then forty-two, planned to travel to Europe in June 1898 aboard the British steamer Tartar Prince.

Acting on an unsubstantiated accusation that Montesi was a Spanish courier, Wilkie dispatched Agent Martin Kastle from Washington to New York. Kastle waited until the ship left its berth, boarded it, searched Montesi's belongings, and interrogated him and his family without filing charges. Nothing incriminating was found, his luggage contained only personal items, including handkerchiefs embroidered with the Cuban flag. Nevertheless, Kastle ordered the ship to anchor off Governors Island and removed the Montesi family from the vessel, causing them to miss their passage. Despite press protests, they were never charged with any offense.

=== Complications over the Carranza Letter ===
After the war had concluded, a year after the discovery of the Carranza Letter, new claims emerged regarding its origins. In The Montreal Star, a twenty-three-year-old English immigrant named George F. Bell, who had a record of criminal activity in the United States, confessed to having stolen the letter from 42 Tupper Street and delivering it to Wilkie. According to Bell, Wilkie had allegedly used captured Spanish stationery and employed a specialist to produce a forged and altered version of the letter. Bell stated that he had remained silent for a year out of fear of prosecution for theft, but decided to come forward after receiving only $50 of an agreed-upon $1,000 payment, plus expenses, from Wilkie.

The Montreal Star account was reprinted by the Boston Evening Transcript, which subsequently published a rebuttal by Ralph D. Redfern, a Secret Service operative based in Boston. Redfern rejected Bell's claims, asserting that he himself had obtained the Carranza letter and that the original, authentic document remained in the Secret Service archives in Washington, D.C.
