= Spy ring =

Group of spies working together

A spy ring, also known as an espionage ring or espionage network, is an organized group of individuals working together to gather intelligence on behalf of a state, acting undercover within the territory or territories of another state. Spy rings exist somewhere on the edges of the intelligence field, as their structural deployment, being cellular instead of centralized, is rare. Spy rings can be deployed and operate within enemy or allied states, during wartime or peacetime. As opposed to the normal modus operandi of the official intelligence network of an intelligence agency, a spy ring is a self-sustaining network of interconnected officers or agents, rather than a collection of individual spies reporting separately to their handlers. The spies are linked to each other, not just to a central handler. They know each other, often recruit each other, providing succour, logistical support, and tradecraft to one another. The ring operates as a cohesive unit and social network with a collective identity. This cohesiveness is critical for the cardinal rule of spy rings, that if one member of the ring gets caught, they cannot implicate any other member of the ring.

As opposed to other forms of group intelligence gathering, spy rings are comparatively rare and present greater counterintelligence difficulties due to the interdependence and communication links among their members.

== Notable spy rings ==
- Culper Spy Ring
- Red Orchestra
  - Red Three
- Cambridge Five
- Cuban Five
- Duquesne Spy Ring
- Portland spy ring
- Walker Spy Ring
- Lucy spy ring
- Joe K spy ring
- Sorge Spy Ring
- Perlo group
- Mersereau Ring
- Montreal Spy Ring
- Woolwich Spy ring
