= Ramón de Carranza Trophy =

Ramón de Carranza Trophy Trofeo Ramón de Carranza
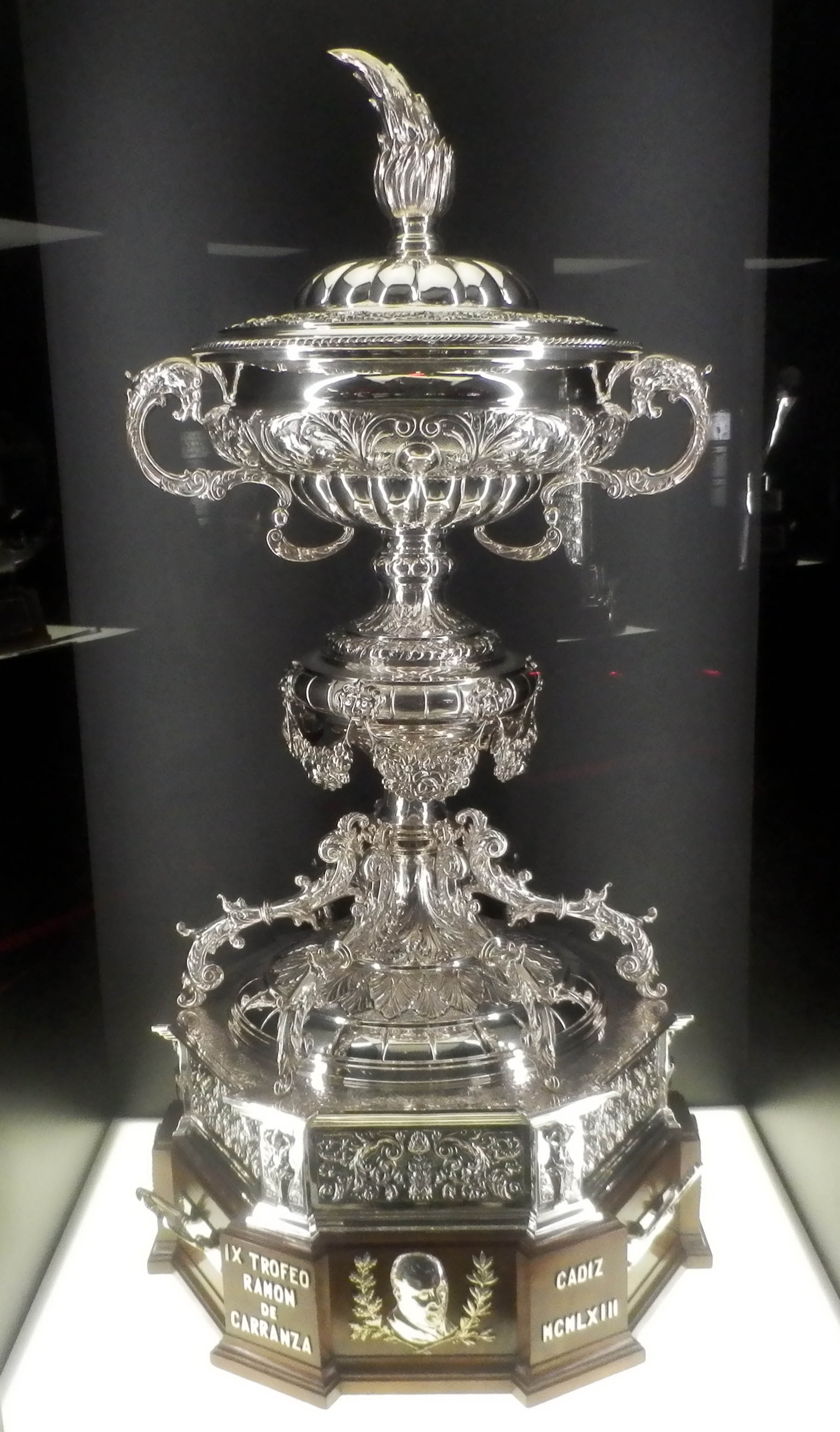
- The trophy on display at the Museu Benfica, Lisbon
- Organiser(s): Cádiz City Hall
- Founded: 1955; 71 years ago
- Region: Cádiz, Spain
- Teams: 4
- Current champions: (Spain) Las Palmas (2026)
- Most championships: (Spain) Atlético Madrid (11 titles) (Spain) Cádiz (11 titles)

The Ramón de Carranza Trophy (Spanish: Trofeo Ramón de Carranza) is a pre-season football tournament organised by Cádiz City Hall in memory of its former mayor, Ramón de Carranza, after whom the Cádiz CF's stadium was also formerly named. The 1962 final is notable for being one of the first football matches in history to be decided by a penalty shoot-out after ending in a draw. Atlético Madrid and Cádiz CF are the most successful clubs in the tournament's history.

A women's edition of the tournament was introduced in 2019. No match was played in 2020 due to the COVID-19 pandemic; in August 2021, two editions, one for men and one for women, were held.

The tournament has been played annually in August since 1955, and is one of the most prestigious summer football tournaments in Spain, alongside the Teresa Herrera Trophy and the Trofeo Colombino.

== List of champions ==
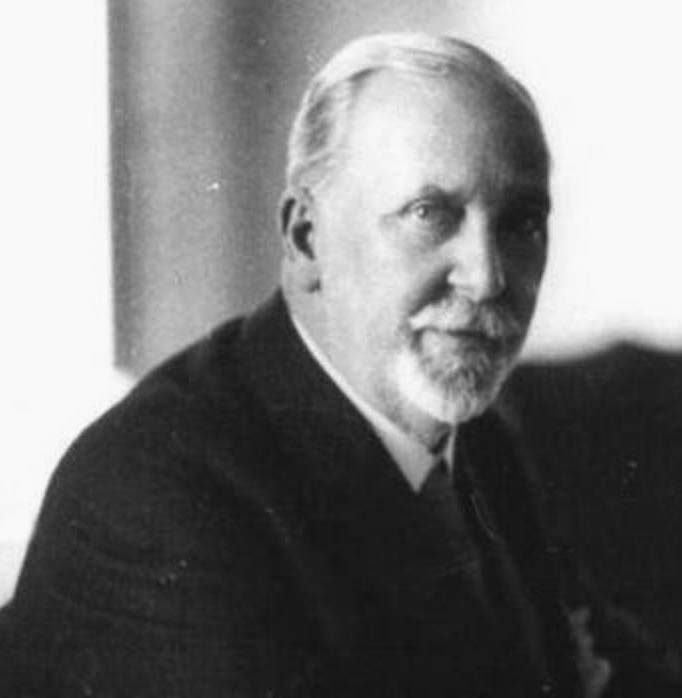
Former major of Cádiz, Ramón de Carranza. The trophy was named after him

Ed.	Year	Winner	Score	Runner up	Third place
1	1955	(Spain) Sevilla	2–1	AC Portugal	– (Note: Two-teams only.)
2	1956	(Spain) Sevilla	3–1	(Spain) Atlético Madrid	–
3	1957	(Spain) Sevilla	3–1	(Spain) Athletic Bilbao	– (Note: No match played between Racing Club de Paris and Os Belenenses.)
4	1958	(Spain) Real Madrid	2–0	(Spain) Sevilla	(Austria) Wiener SC
5	1959	(Spain) Real Madrid	4–3	(Spain) Barcelona	(Italy) Milan
6	1960	(Spain) Real Madrid	4–0	(Spain) Athletic Bilbao	(France) Reims
7	1961	(Spain) Barcelona	2–1	(Uruguay) Peñarol	(Argentina) River Plate
8	1962	(Spain) Barcelona	1–1 (p)	(Spain) Zaragoza	(Italy) Internazionale
9	1963	(Portugal) Benfica	7–3 (a.e.t.)	(Italy) Fiorentina	(Spain) Barcelona
10	1964	(Spain) Real Betis	2–0 (a.e.t.)	(Portugal) Benfica	(Spain) Real Madrid
11	1965	(Spain) Zaragoza	3–2	(Portugal) Benfica	(Brazil) Flamengo
12	1966	(Spain) Real Madrid	2–0	(Italy) Torino	(Spain) Zaragoza
13	1967	(Spain) Valencia	2–1	(Spain) Real Madrid	(Uruguay) Peñarol
14	1968	(Spain) Atlético Madrid	1–0	(Spain) Barcelona	(Spain) Real Madrid
15	1969	(Brazil) Palmeiras	2–0	(Spain) Real Madrid	(Argentina) Estudiantes LP
16	1970	(Spain) Real Madrid	4–2	(Argentina) Independiente	(Italy) Milan
17	1971	(Portugal) Benfica	3–0	(Uruguay) Peñarol	(Spain) Valencia
18	1972	(Spain) Athletic Bilbao	2–1 (a.e.t.)	(Portugal) Benfica	(Brazil) Botafogo
19	1973	(Spain) Espanyol	1–0	(Spain) Athletic Bilbao	(Netherlands) Ajax
20	1974	(Brazil) Palmeiras	2–1	(Spain) Espanyol	(Spain) Barcelona
21	1975	(Brazil) Palmeiras	3–1	(Spain) Real Madrid	(Soviet Union) Dynamo Moscow
22	1976	(Spain) Atlético Madrid	1–0	(Spain) Athletic Bilbao	(Brazil) Palmeiras
23	1977	(Spain) Atlético Madrid	2–0	(Italy) Internazionale	(Brazil) Vasco da Gama
24	1978	(Spain) Atlético Madrid	1–0	(Argentina) River Plate	(Spain) Valencia
25	1979	(Brazil) Flamengo	2–0	(Hungary) Újpesti Dózsa	(Spain) Barcelona
26	1980	(Brazil) Flamengo	2–1	(Spain) Real Betis	(Soviet Union) FC Dinamo Tbilisi
27	1981	(Spain) Cádiz	1–0	(Spain) Sevilla	(Bulgaria) CSKA Sofia
28	1982	(Spain) Real Madrid	1–0 (a.e.t.)	(Spain) Real Sociedad	(Spain) Real Betis
29	1983	(Spain) Cádiz	1–1 (5–4 p)	(Spain) Real Betis	(Uruguay) Peñarol
30	1984	(Spain) Sporting Gijón	1–0	(Spain) Athletic Bilbao	(Spain) Cádiz
31	1985	(Spain) Cádiz	1–1 (4–3 p)	(Brazil) Grêmio	(Spain) Sevilla
32	1986	(Spain) Cádiz	1–1 (3–2 p)	(Spain) Real Betis	(Brazil) Botafogo
33	1987	(Brazil) Vasco da Gama	2–0	(Spain) Cádiz	(Uruguay) Nacional
34	1988	(Brazil) Vasco da Gama	2–1	(Spain) Atlético Madrid	(Spain) Cádiz
35	1989	(Brazil) Vasco da Gama	2–0	(Uruguay) Nacional	(Spain) Atlético Madrid
36	1990	(Brazil) Atlético Mineiro	1–0	(Brazil) Santos	(Spain) Cádiz
37	1991	(Spain) Atlético Madrid	2–1	(Spain) Cádiz	(Brazil) Atlético Mineiro
38	1992	(Brazil) São Paulo	4–0	(Spain) Real Madrid	(Netherlands) Eindhoven
39	1993	(Spain) Cádiz	1–1 (3–1 p)	(Brazil) Palmeiras	(Spain) Atlético Madrid
40	1994	(Spain) Cádiz	0–0 (5–4 p)	(Spain) Sevilla	(Spain) Real Madrid
41	1995	(Spain) Atlético Madrid	4–1	(Spain) Real Betis	(Spain) Cádiz
42	1996	(Brazil) Corinthians	2–0	(Spain) Real Betis	(Mexico) Atlético Celaya
43	1997	(Spain) Atlético Madrid	6–3	(Spain) Tenerife	(Brazil) Corinthians
44	1998	(Spain) Deportivo de A Coruña	2–0	(Spain) Cádiz	(Italy) Sampdoria
45	1999	(Spain) Real Betis	2–2 (4–2 p)	(Italy) Lazio	(Spain) Cádiz
46	2000	(Spain) Real Betis	3–0	(Spain) Cádiz	–
47	2001	(Spain) Real Betis	6–1	(Spain) Málaga	(Spain) Celta Vigo
48	2002	(Spain) Mallorca	0–0 (3–2 p)	(Spain) Valencia	(Spain) Real Betis
49	2003	(Spain) Atlético Madrid	0–0 (4–2 p)	(Spain) Málaga	(Spain) Real Betis
50	2004	(Spain) Sevilla	2–1	(Spain) Valencia	(Spain) Cádiz
51	2005	(Spain) Barcelona	3–1	(Spain) Cádiz	(Portugal) Braga
52	2006	(Spain) Cádiz	2–2 (5–4 p)	(Spain) Real Betis	(Spain) Villarreal
53	2007	(Spain) Real Betis	1–1 (4–3 p)	(Spain) Zaragoza	(Spain) Real Madrid
54	2008	(Spain) Sevilla	3–0	(Spain) Cádiz	(Spain) Athletic Bilbao
55	2009	(Spain) Sevilla	1–0	(Spain) Deportivo de A Coruña	(Spain) Cádiz
56	2010	(Spain) Espanyol	1–1 (4–3 p)	(Spain) Atlético Madrid	(Spain) Sevilla
57	2011	(Spain) Cádiz	2–0	(Spain) Málaga	(Italy) Udinese
58	2012	(Portugal) Nacional	3–1	(Spain) Rayo Vallecano	(Spain) Osasuna
59	2013	(Spain) Sevilla	Round-robin	(Morocco) Moghreb Tétouan	(Spain) Cádiz
60	2014	(Spain) Atlético Madrid	2–0	(Italy) Sampdoria	(Spain) Sevilla
61	2015	(Spain) Atlético Madrid	3–0	(Spain) Real Betis	(Spain) Granada
62	2016	(Spain) Málaga	2–1	(Spain) Cádiz	(Spain) Atlético Madrid
63	2017	(Spain) Las Palmas	2–0	(Spain) Málaga	(Spain) Villarreal
64	2018	(Spain) Real Betis	4–0	(Spain) Las Palmas	– (Note: No third place awarded so Real Betis qualified directly to final, where it played vs the winner of Cádiz vs Las Palmas semifinal.)
65	2019 (Note: women's teams competition.)	(Spain) Athletic Bilbao	1–1 (5–4 p)	(England) Tottenham Hotspur	– (Note: No match played between Real Betis and Tacón.)
66	2020	(Spain) Cádiz	1–1 (4–2 p)	(Spain) Atlético Madrid	–
67	2021	(Spain) Athletic Bilbao	1–0	(Spain) Atlético Madrid	–
68	2022	(Spain) Atlético Madrid	4–1	(Spain) Cádiz	–
69	2023	(Spain) Cádiz	1–1 (4–2 p)	(Italy) Lecce	–
70	2024	(Italy) Lazio	1–0	(Spain) Cádiz	–
71	2025	(Spain) Cádiz	1–1 (6–5 p)	(Spain) Córdoba	–
72	2026	(Spain) Las Palmas	3–1	(Spain) Cádiz	–

== Titles by club ==
Team	Nation	Titles	Years won
Atlético Madrid	Spain	11	1968, 1976, 1977, 1978, 1991, 1995, 1997, 2003, 2014, 2015, 2022
Cádiz	Spain	11	1981, 1983, 1985, 1986, 1993, 1994, 2006, 2011, 2020, 2023, 2025
Sevilla	Spain	7	1955, 1956, 1957, 2004, 2008, 2009, 2013
Real Madrid	Spain	6	1958, 1959, 1960, 1966, 1970, 1982
Real Betis	Spain	6	1964, 1999, 2000, 2001, 2007, 2018
Barcelona	Spain	3	1961, 1962, 2005
Palmeiras	Brazil	3	1969, 1974, 1975
Vasco da Gama	Brazil	3	1987, 1988, 1989
Benfica	Portugal	2	1963, 1971
Flamengo	Brazil	2	1979, 1980
Espanyol	Spain	2	1973, 2010
Athletic Bilbao Women	Spain	2	2019, 2021
Las Palmas	Spain	2	2017, 2026
Zaragoza	Spain	1	1965
Valencia	Spain	1	1967
Athletic Bilbao	Spain	1	1972
Sporting Gijón	Spain	1	1984
Atlético Mineiro	Brazil	1	1990
São Paulo	Brazil	1	1992
Corinthians	Brazil	1	1996
Deportivo de A Coruña	Spain	1	1998
Mallorca	Spain	1	2002
Nacional	Portugal	1	2012
Málaga	Spain	1	2016
Lazio	Italy	1	2024

== Top goalscorers ==
Rank	Player	Team	Goals
1	(Spain) Paco Gento	Real Madrid	9
1	(Portugal) Eusébio	Benfica	9
3	(Spain) Alfredo Di Stéfano	Real Madrid	8
4	(Hungary) Ferenc Puskás	Real Madrid	7
5	(Spain) Marcelino Martínez	Zaragoza	6
5	(Portugal) José Torres	Benfica	6
5	(El Salvador) Mágico González	Cádiz	6
8	(Brazil) Zico	Flamengo	5

== See also ==
- Colombino Trophy
- Santiago Bernabéu Trophy
- Teresa Herrera Trophy
