= Embarkation =

Procedure for packing people or, less often, cargo or freight onto a boat or airplane

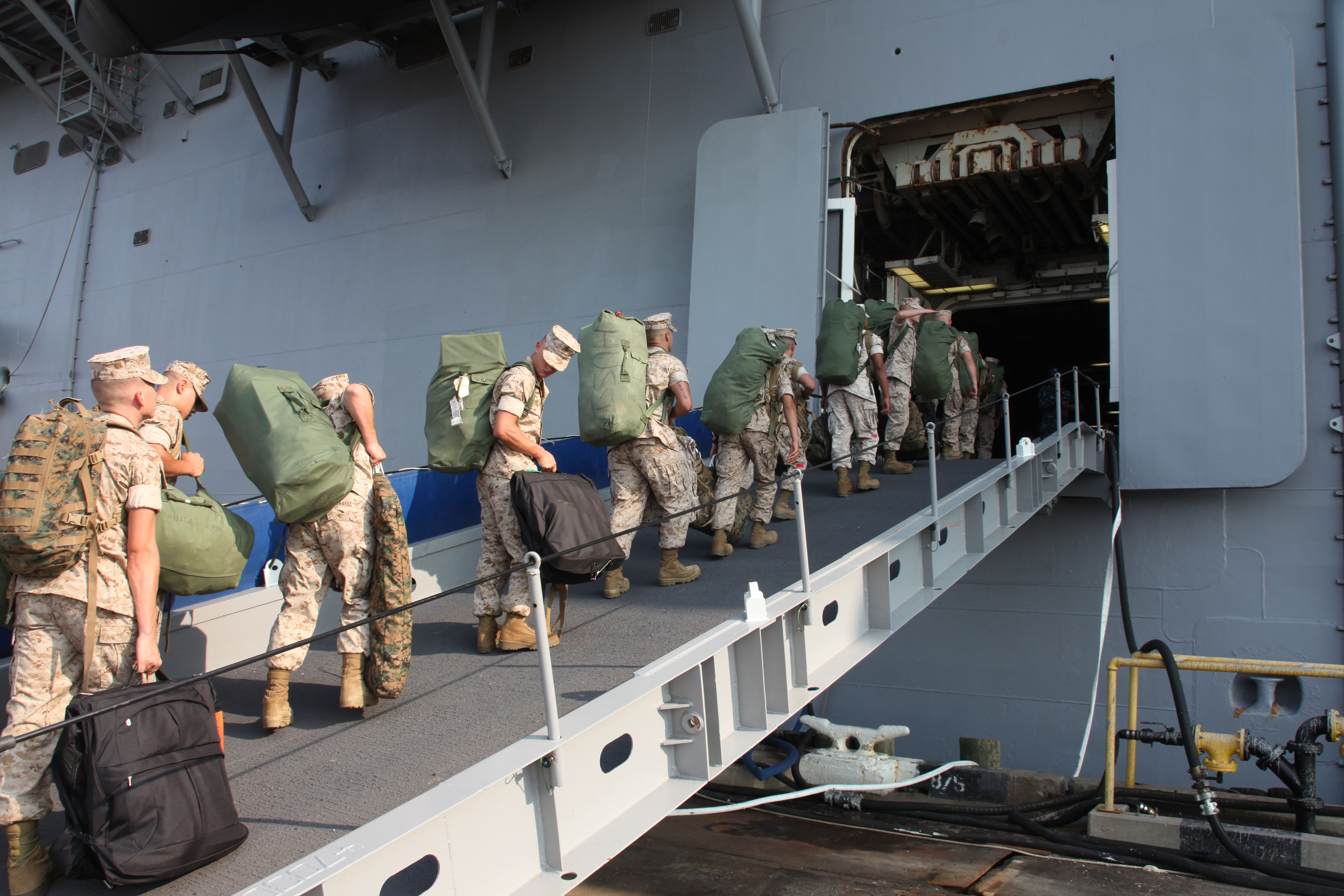
United States Marines and Sailors embarking on the USS Iwo Jima.

Embarkment (sometimes embarcation or embarkation) is the process of loading a passenger ship or an airplane with passengers or military personnel, related to and overlapping with individual boarding on aircraft and ships.

== Boarding (ship) ==
Embarkation involves the boarding and stationing of passengers in accommodation (cabins) by staff and crew members.

== Legal issues ==
The act of embarkation or disembarkation is related to various legal issues such a liability for accidents, or in relation to immigration and refugee status. Generally liability for an accident prior to embarkation or boarding, such as during a security check is considered to not be part of the embarkation system.
