= Ramón de Carranza y Fernández Reguera =

Spanish Navy officer and politician (1863–1937)

Don Ramón, Marques, s.s.q.e.s.m, Ramón de Carranza y Fernández Reguera IX Marquesado de la Villa de Pesadilla
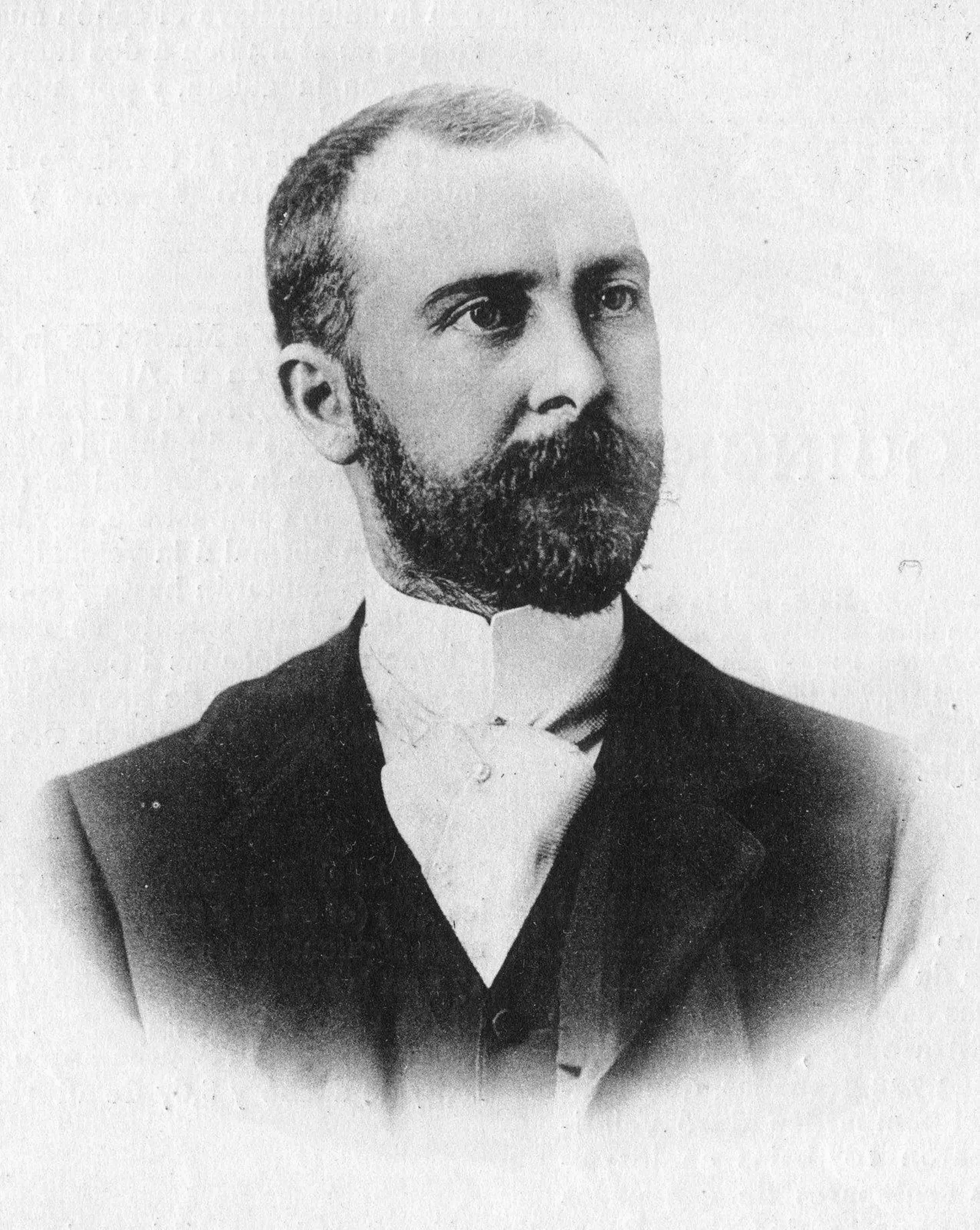
- Carranza in 1898, while serving as Naval attaché in Washington, D.C.

Mayor of Cádiz
- In office 28 July 1936 – 16 July 1937
- Appointed by: Queipo de Llano
- Preceded by: Eduardo Aranda Asquerino
- Succeeded by: Juan de Dios Molina

Civil Governor of Cádiz Province
- In office 19 July 1936 – 06 August 1936
- Appointed by: Queipo de Llano

Cortes Generales
- In office 19 November 1933 – 17 July 1936

Mayor of Cádiz
- In office 15 July 1927 – 14 April 1931
- Prime Minister: Miguel Primo de Rivera; Dámaso Berenguer
- Preceded by: Agustín Blázquez y Paúl
- Succeeded by: Emilio de Sola Ramos

Senate of Spain
- In office: El Puerto de Santa María 1919; Cádiz Province 1907 - 1917

Congress of Deputies
- In office Algeciras; 1903 - 1905

Naval attaché to Canada
- In office April 21, 1898 – June 10, 1898
- Minister: Luis Polo de Bernabé; Eusebio Bonilla Martel
- Legation: Montreal and Toronto
- Consul: Eusebio Bonilla Martel

Naval attaché to the United States
- In office March 1898 – April 20, 1898
- Minister: Luis Polo de Bernabé
- Legation: Washington, D.C.
- Military attaché: Enrique Carlos de la Casa
- Preceded by: Gutiérrez Sobral

Personal details
- Born: 16 April 1863 Born at sea, North Atlantic Ocean, Spain
- Died: 13 September 1937 (aged 74) Cádiz, Andalusia, Spain
- Party: Conservatives; CEDA
- Spouse: Josefa Gómez Arámburu
- Children: Ramón de Carranza Gómez; José León de Carranza
- Parents: José Juan de Carranza y Echevarría; Carmen Fernández de la Reguera y Fernández de Pola
- Awards: Cross of Naval Merit (x2); Order of Maria Christina; Laureate Cross of Saint Ferdinand; Knight 1st Class, Order of Military Merit; Silver Medal for the Rescue of Shipwrecked Persons; Medal of the Coronation of Alfonso XIII; Grand Cross of the Military Order of San Hermenegild; Order of Isabella the Catholic; Cross of the Savior of Greece; Knight of San Silvestre

Military service
- Branch/service: Spanish Navy; Francoist Army
- Battles/wars: Third Carlist War; Cuban War of Independence; Spanish-American War; Spanish Civil War

Ramón de Carranza y Fernández de la Reguera, Marquis of la Villa de Pesadilla (16 April 1863 – 13 September 1938) was a Spanish sailor, intelligence officer, diplomat, politician, and an increasingly controversial figure in the history of Spain. For over twenty years, he was a career officer in the Spanish Navy, leading raiding parties and engaging in naval battles all over the world.

During the Cuban War of Independence, he earned several medals for bravery and courage under fire. After the destruction of the USS Maine in Cuba, he was assigned the position of Naval attaché at the Spanish Legation in Washington, D.C. With the outbreak of the Spanish–American War, he became the chief spymaster of the Montreal Spy Ring, and US intelligence historians have suggested that he was the most importantly-positioned Spaniard on the entire American continent at the time.

After the war, he returned to Spain, where he entered into politics. Carranza served in the Cortes Generales, the Congress of Deputies, and over half a dozen terms in the Senate of Spain. While serving an earlier term as mayor, he oversaw the creation of the Bullring of Cádiz and several popular hotels. However, he left the city bankrupt, forced to leave politics for several years. During the Spanish Civil War, Carranza was loyal to the Francoists and served in the Francoist Army. During the war, he was made again the Mayor of Cádiz, and its provincial Civil Governor, during which time he oversaw one of the city's harshest periods of civil repression and extrajudicial executions. However, his specific involvement in these deaths is considered unverified by the People's Party.

== Career in the Spanish Navy ==
On 13 April 1863, Ramón de Carranza was born at sea on a passenger ship in the middle of its voyage from the Balearic Islands to Galicia. When the ship pulled into port at its destination of Ferrol, Galicia, Spain, his birth was recorded at the nearest courthouse as being in that city.

He was born into a family with a long tradition and history of sailing and deep roots in the Spanish Navy. He was the third of six children. His father, José Juan de Carranza y Echevarría, had served most of his life in the navy around Galicia, but would reach the rank of Admiral in the late 1880s and go on to serve as Captain General of Ferrol and later of Cádiz. His mother was Carmen Fernández de la Reguera y Fernández de Pola, who came from Santander. Two of his brothers; Fernando, Juan Manuel, also pursued careers in the navy. Another one of his brothers, José Ignacio, joined the Spanish Marine Infantry.

=== Early naval career ===
On 17 August 1876, shortly after the Third Carlist War, at only the age of 13, Carranza entered the Spanish Navy as a cadet. Graduating at the top of his class, he advanced to marine guard second-class midshipman on 25 June 1878, serving his first posting aboard the frigate Blanca. In July 1881 he became a first-class midshipman, and was commissioned as an ensign on 25 July 1882.

On 16 July 1886, he was promoted to Lieutenant and posted to Cádiz. After a great scandal while his father was serving as the Capitan General of Ferrol, with protestors throwing stones at the family house, the rest of his family later followed Carranza to Cádiz where they began to try and embed within the local fishing community.

Through the 1890s, Carranza continued to advance through a series of standard naval assignments, serving as a navigation officer aboard the battleship Pelayo and the cruiser Conde del Venadito.

In 1890, he married Josefa Gómez Aramburu, a member of one of the most important families in Cádiz and the daughter of a wealthy shipping tycoon who was also involved in the Aramburu Bank, giving him access to her family's relatively immense wealth. This allowed him his own entry into the profitable tuna fishing industry at Cádiz. Together, the couple would have seven children, although only four of them survived childhood.

==== Loss of the Tajo (1895) ====
In 1895, Carranza was appointed Commander of the Somorrostro-class iron-hulled gunboat Tajo, which was built for coastal surveillance during the Third Carlist War. It was roughly 24 meters long and 5 meters wide, armed with two guns mounted in a rotating turret. As its commander, Carranza was tasked with patrol duties along the Cantabrian Coast and the Bidasoa River on the border with France.

On 29 May 1895, Carranza anchored at Pasajes to examine the nearby inlet of Illurgita. As he approached Pasajes, he ordered the helm to port to avoid a large rock in the water. The helmsman warned that the rudder was not responding. Carranza ordered full reverse to avoid impact, but the ship's momentum carried it onto the rock. The collision opened the hull, and the gunboat began to sink rapidly.

Carranza ordered the immediate abandonment of the vessel, but remained aboard. One of the lifeboats reached the nearby shore, but the other capsized in the whirlpool created by the sinking. A fishing boat was able to rescue the sailors. All survived except one sailor, Enrique Lago, who drowned after the capsize. Carranza himself was later pulled from the water, unconscious.

While authorities investigated the sinking, Carranza was assigned to command the coastal patrol boats of the Basque Provinces and oversee surveillance along the French border. A formal court-martial convened in Ferrol on 16 August. After reviewing testimony and technical reports, the board unanimously acquitted Carranza of all responsibility. He then returned to Cádiz with his family on a two-month leave.

=== Cuban War of Independence ===
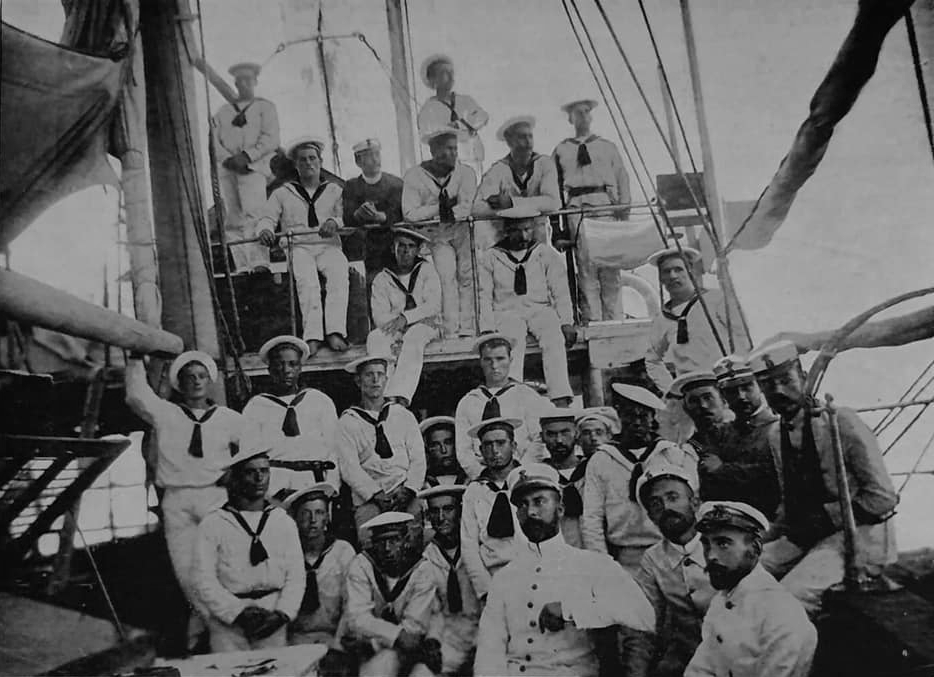
The crew of the Contramaestre. Carranza is in the bottom of the frame, next to his XO Alférez Pasquín.

On 1 January 1896, at his own request, Carranza was posted to Havana, which was at that time the capital of Spanish Cuba. The Spanish Empire was embroiled in the Cuban War of Independence against the Republic of Cuba in Arms. Having served on over 50 ships at that point, Carranza understood that service in armed combat, naval or otherwise, offered greater prospects for distinction and promotion than patrol duties elsewhere. With the expansion of military operations in the Antilles, he was placed under the authority of the commander of the Cuban Armada, Marengo, and assigned to carry out regular inspection missions aboard vessels of the Compañía Trasatlántica.

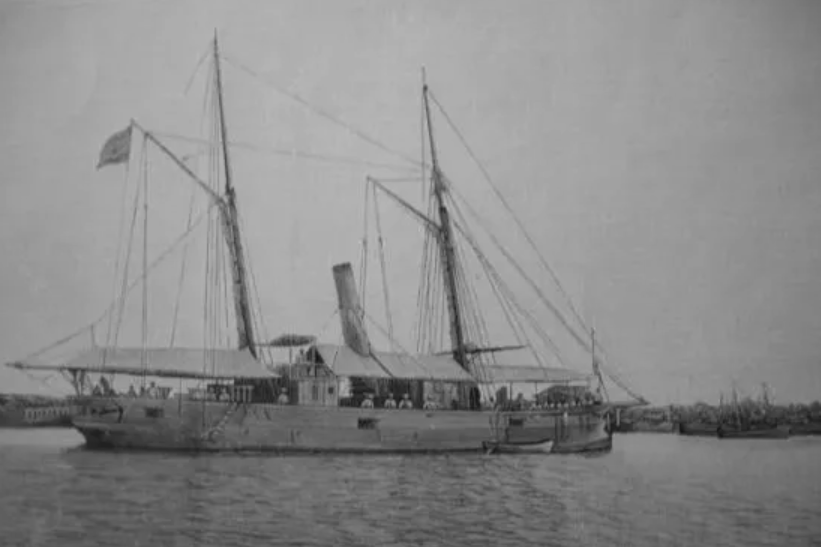
The Contramaestre as seen in 1896.

On 18 May 1896, despite the vessel itself being noted as in very poor condition and nearing the end of its service life, Carranza was given command of the small, shallow-draft Activo class gunboat Contramaestre. Built in New York in 1869, with a displacement of 179 tons and measuring 32.51 meters long, the wooden-hulled Contramaestre was powered by machinery producing 137 horsepower, driving two shafts to achieve a speed of 8 knots. It had an operational range of 1,600 miles and carried a single 130mm muzzle-loading Parrott rifle as its primary armament. This was one of the several craft charged with patrolling the Cuban coastline to intercept smuggled arms and to respond to local uprisings of the Mambises and the Cuban Liberation Army.

On 15 October 1896, during one of these routine coastline patrols, the crew investigated reports of suspicious activity near the mouth of the Río de San Juan using a ship's launch, which came under fire from insurgent forces, suggesting that there might be a significant rebel stronghold here. Because the Contramaestre was unable to cross the river bar, the smaller launch Ardilla was used to enter the port despite sustained enemy fire. Carranza went ashore with a detachment of thirty-four men. On shore, outnumbered and surrounded, he and his men engaged and dispersed a force of roughly four hundred armed insurgents attempting to protect a cache of smuggled war supplies. After fighting through and driving the rebels from a stone-built defensive position, the landing party secured the hidden stock of arms and ammunition.

For his actions and courage under fire, Carranza was awarded the Cross of Naval Merit with red insignia, and two plaques of the Royal Order of María Cristina.

At some point, he returned to Cádiz.

=== Spanish legation at Washington, D.C. ===
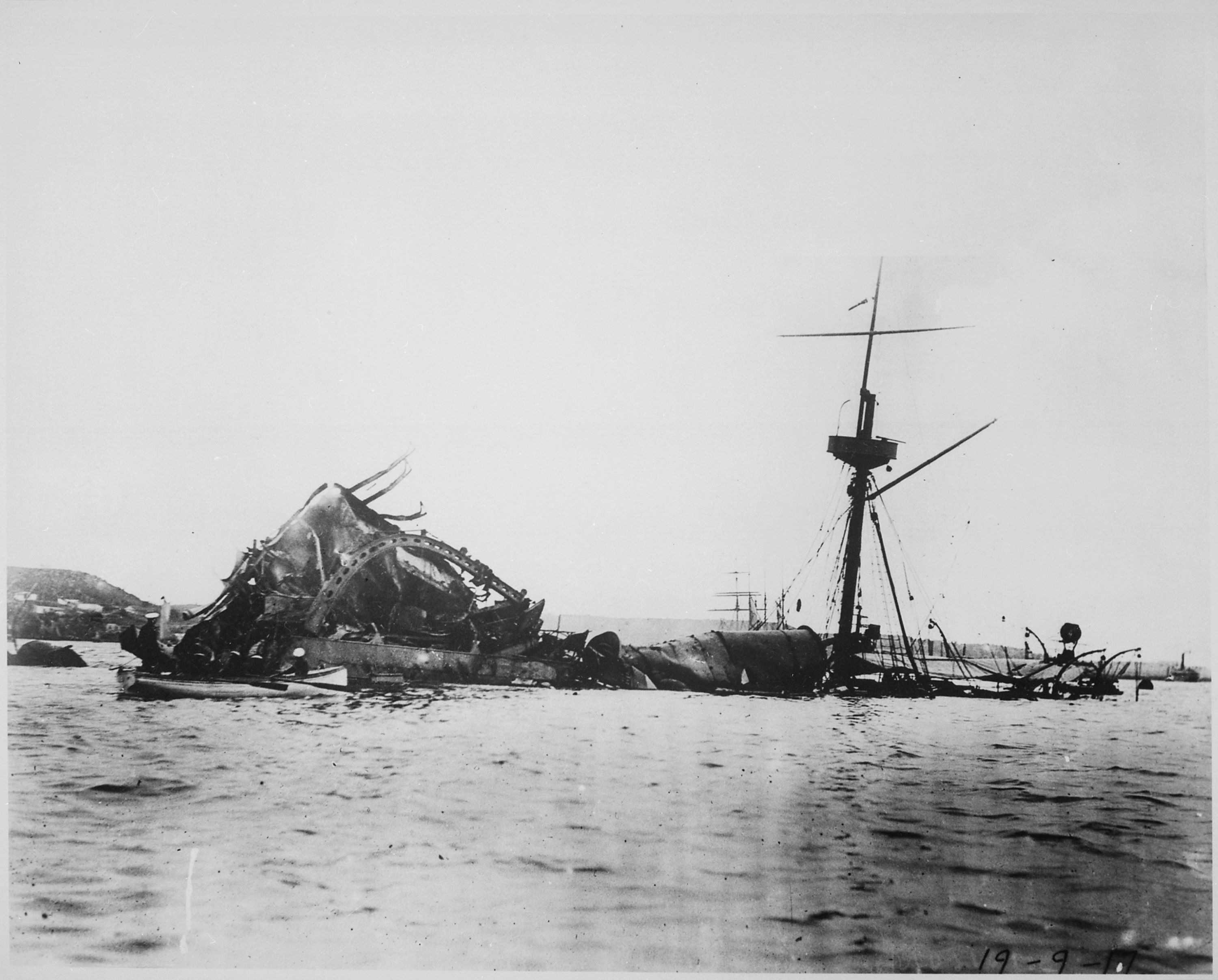
Wreckage of the USS Maine in Havana Harbor.

On February 15, 1898, the US Navy battleship USS Maine suffered a catastrophic explosion in Havana Harbor, resulting in the deaths of 261 of its 355 crew members. The American press and US government officials immediately placed blame on Spain, and the incident served as a direct catalyst to ramp-up tensions and stoke the war-fervor of the US citizenry. The Spanish naval commander in Cuba, Admiral Vicente Manterola, directed Captain Don Pedro del Peral y Caballero to conduct and adjudicate a formal investigation into the explosion, assisted by Lieutenant Don Francisco Javier de Salas González . Their findings concluded that the disaster was unequivocally due to an internal accident on the ship, fully clearing Spain of any responsibility. In contrast, American authorities in Cuba and the press magnate William Randolph Hearst's publications directly accused Spain of sabotage.

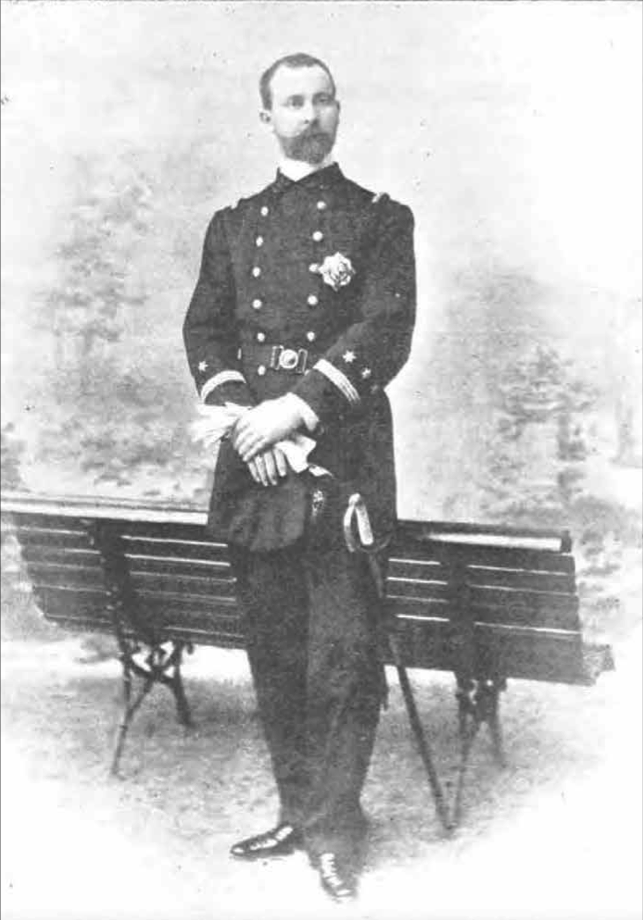
Ramón de Carranza, the war hero and reluctant master spy.

Traveling from Cádiz to Madrid at the time, Carranza received instructions from Práxedes Mateo Sagasta and Segismundo Bermejo, and was ordered to go to Havana to retrieve the investigative file on the Maine and hand-deliver it to the administration of President William McKinley. Although war seemed inevitable, the Spanish government was attempting to avert it. He arrived in Havana on March 24, where he consulted with numerous witnesses of the disaster. He then proceeded to Washington, D.C., with the file compiled by Peral and Salas.

On April 2, immediately upon his arrival, Carranza and the Spanish Ambassador Luis Polo de Bernabé presented the investigative report to Secretary of State John Sherman. They insisted that Spain did not fear war, but was not responsible for the Maine's destruction. Meanwhile, massive public demonstrations against Spain erupted in Washington and New York, fueled by the slogan, "Remember the Maine. To hell with Spain!"

Expecting to be returned to a posting aboard a ship at sea after the delivery of the documents, Carranza was instead appointed as the naval attaché to the Spanish Legation in Washington. This was a highly sensitive posting, given that the two nations were on the verge of war. Carranza was a top-ranked officer from his promotion, a torpedo specialist, already a decorated veteran of the Cuban conflict, and fluent in English. This made him highly sought-after by the Legation as a naval intelligence officer.

The positing of Naval attaché has traditionally been used by many nations as a diplomatic cover for intelligence coordination since the late nineteenth century. Carranza did not enjoy the assignment, believing himself better suited as a sailor, and desiring of further advancement through combat. He maintained strong ties within the Spanish Admiralty and requested to participate directly in naval combat. He grew frustrated at being confined to intelligence duties, believing that Spain's chances of success depended on active engagement at sea rather than covert operations. Nevertheless, he performed his duties despite the hindrances of what he would later call the ineptitude of his superiors.

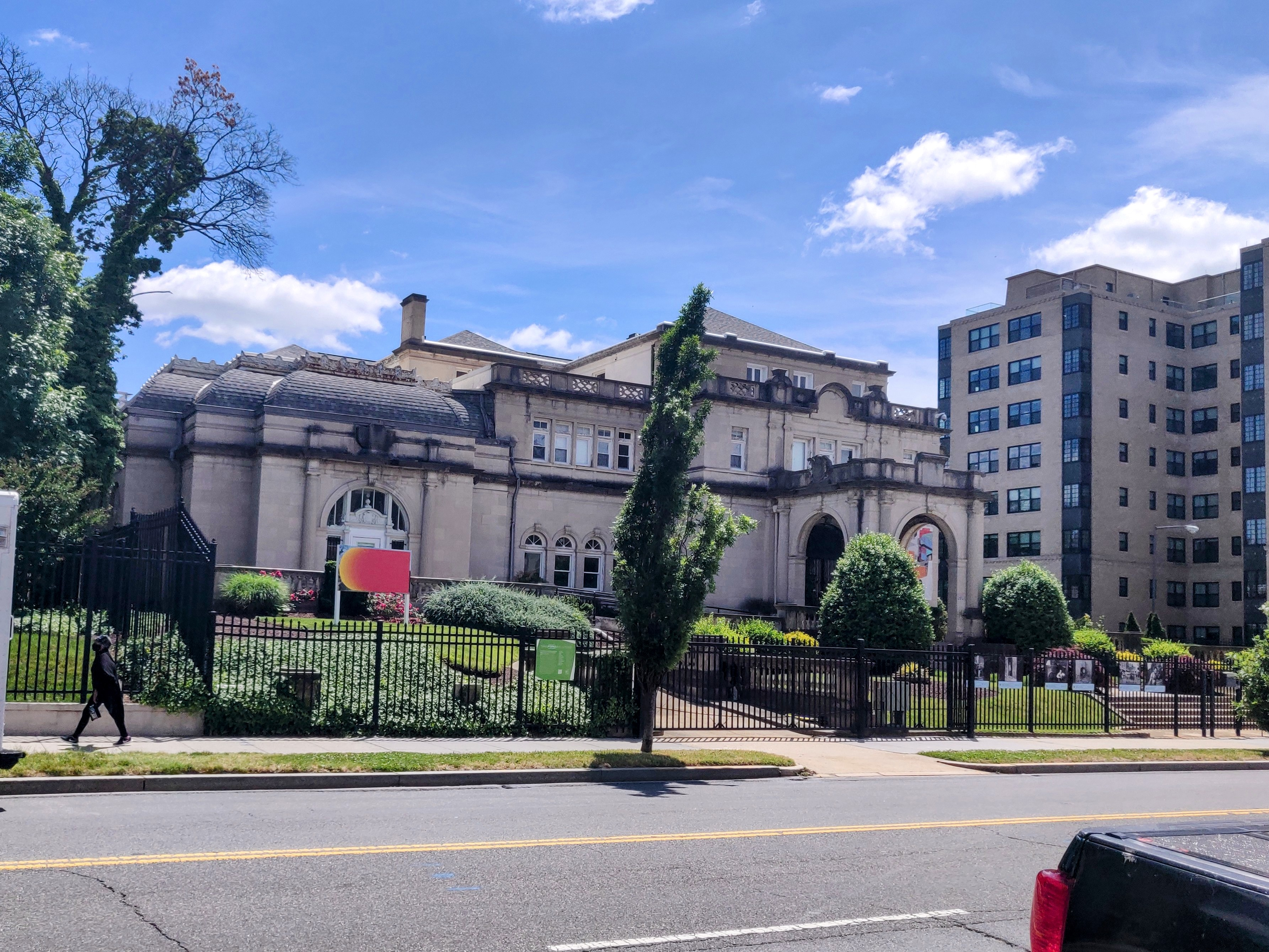
The old Spanish Legation in Washington where Carranza was posted to his first political appointment.

As the unofficial director of Spanish naval intelligence in Washington, Carranza relied heavily on Spanish immigrantnetworks in the United States. Communities in Tampa, Key West, New Orleans, and Mobile provided potential recruits and logistical support for intelligence and propaganda operations. Pro-Spanish sympathizers in those cities had allegedly raised funds to purchase a small warship for Spain and to conduct reconnaissance of American naval installations along the Atlantic coast. US field operatives also reported sightings of suspected Spanish agents as far west as San Francisco, allegedly engaged in surveillance of military facilities in the Bay Area. American intelligence later reported that Segismundo Bermejo, Spain's Minister of the Navy, had authorized plans to sabotage U.S. naval bases on both coasts. There were also fears that Spanish agents had infiltrated the U.S. Army and might reveal troop movements.

==== Challenge to a duel ====
When the U.S. Senate investigated the incident, the Maine's captain, Charles Sigsbee, and the American consul in Cuba, Fitzhugh Lee, testified that the Spanish had treacherously caused the explosion. Viewing the accusations as a profound affront to the dignity of the Spanish Navy, Carranza approached the Spanish Minister, Luis Polo de Bernabé, to request authorization for sending formal duel challenges to both Lee and Sigsbee. Minister Bernabé, striving to protect the standing of the Spanish diplomatic mission, explicitly prohibited the action as long as Carranza held an official diplomatic position.

Enrique Carlos de la Casa helped Carranza draft the formal language of the duel and acted as his second.

The political situation deteriorated rapidly, and the Spanish Legation was compelled to make plans for evacuating its personnel to the neutral territory of Canada. With the breaking of diplomatic ties between the United States and Spain imminent, Minister Bernabé conceded that the challenges could be issued once their official status as diplomats had ended.

The situation escalated quickly. On April 19, the Spanish legation was ordered to leave the United States. Aided by Captain Enrique Carlos de la Casa, the Spanish military attaché, Carranza composed two meticulously worded letters of challenge, adhering to the strict protocols of dueling etiquette. These challenges were formally dispatched on April 20, 1898, the very day diplomatic relations were severed and the U.S. State Department provided the Spanish legation with their travel documents. Carranza informed newspaper reporters that should Lee or Sigsbee wish to accept his challenge, they could locate him in Canada, at the Spanish Consulate in Toronto should they wish to accept.

In his letter to General Fitzhugh Lee, Carranza wrote that a man who, without proof, judges others capable of such a felony is himself capable of it. He accused Lee of slandering Spanish naval officers and demanded satisfaction.

To General Fitzhugh Lee:

Sir: The newspapers have published that you stated before the Senate committee investigating the destruction of the warship Maine that you had always held the idea that some of the Spanish officers of the Havana Arsenal were guilty of detonating the torpedo or submarine mine which, according to the American court, was the cause of the aforementioned disaster.

Now free from the restrictions imposed by the official post I occupied in the Spanish legation, I now wish to tell you that in my opinion the man who, without proof, judges others capable of committing such a felony is himself capable of carrying it out.

You have maliciously slandered Spanish naval officers as a whole, and if you are a man of honor, before going to Cuba to fight against my comrades, as you say you wish to do, you will come to meet me as a representative of the Corps you have offended.

Regarding the insults you have hurled upon Spain, the Spaniards, and their Army, I could respond, if I were like you, by hurling the same upon your country and your people; but firstly, I do not hold the majority, whom I esteem and respect, responsible for the feelings of a minority that has misled and poisoned public opinion, and also because the conduct of a gentleman is always very different from that which you have deemed appropriate to adopt.

I will be at your disposal in Toronto for eight days. My address, the Spanish Consulate in Toronto.

~I have the honor to be your most obedient and faithful servant, Ramón de Carranza. Lieutenant of the Spanish Royal Navy.

His letter to Captain Charles Sigsbee stated that anyone who, without adequate proof, questioned the honor of others possessed little honor themselves. He similarly challenged Sigsbee to a duel.

To Captain Sigsbee:

Sir: I have read in the press that you expressed the opinion that "as there were so many idle Spanish officers in Havana, one of them could very well have placed the torpedo or mine which, according to American investigations, destroyed the warship Maine.

I request that you inform me if you assume responsibility for an assertion so offensive to Spanish Officers, in which case I would tell you that he who, without adequate proof, judges the honor of others in such a way, is because he himself has no honor or possesses very little, although this may seem strange in a person belonging to a Corps whose honor is well-known.

I will be at your disposal in Toronto for eight days. My address: Spanish Consulate in Toronto.

~I have the honor to be your most obedient and faithful servant, Lieutenant Ramón de Carranza, Spanish Royal Navy.

Carranza waited in Toronto for eight days. Although several Americans responded, neither Sigsbee nor Lee appeared to face him.

As a result of Carranza's recent publicity, the Secret Service offered its "protection services" to the Spanish Legation so that they would not be accosted on their journey to Canada. Secretly, they had been tasked by John Wilkie to observe their movements and collect intelligence. Four detectives were assigned to observe their movements, two openly and two covertly.

== Spanish-American War ==
=== Montreal Spy Ring (1898) ===
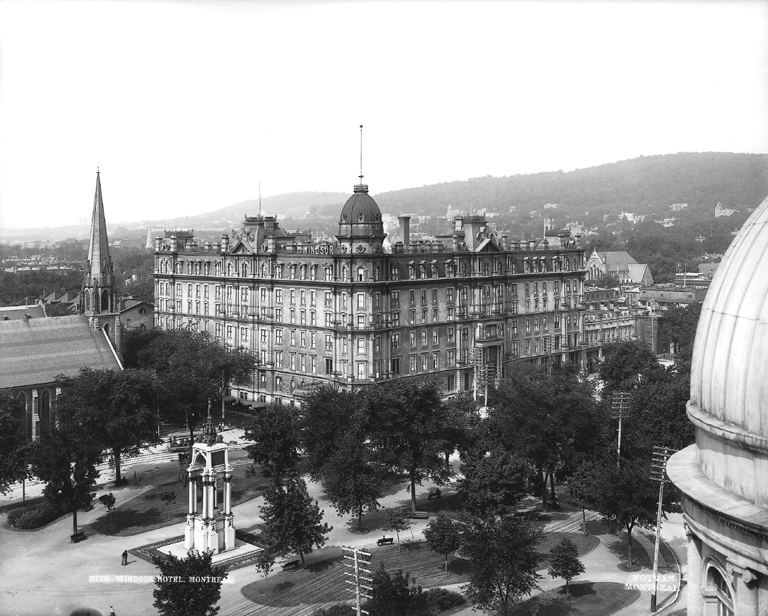
The Montreal Spy Ring was initially headquartered out of the Windsor Hotel.

After leaving the United States, Ramón de Carranza received a telegram from the Ministry of the Navy to continue in Canada "as a license to travel abroad," and another from the Ministry of State to continue in Canada providing "services and commissions." Here, he would become the powerful spymaster of what would later be called by historians the Montreal Spy Ring.

Although Spain received polite denials of intelligence support from other European powers, its leaders continued to hope for sympathy from Catholic and monarchist circles abroad. The city of Montreal was the cultural epicenter of predominately Catholic French Canada. As the capital of Quebec, it was also the principal railway hub of Canada's railway system in 1898. Montreal offered convenient connections to New York, Halifax, and the Pacific coast. Its location also allowed for observation of shipping traffic moving between the Great Lakes and the Atlantic Ocean. In addition, the city's concentration of corporate headquarters and government offices enabled discreet contact with influential figures. For these reasons, Montreal emerged as the natural center of Spanish diplomatic and intelligence activity in Canada during the conflict.

On 6 May 1898, members of the Spanish Legation in Washington, including First Secretary Juan Dubosc and Ramón de Carranza, traveled by train to Montreal. Upon arrival, they took up residence in rooms 126 and 128 of the Windsor Hotelon Dominion Square and began coordinating their activities with Eusebio Bonilla Martel. Despite his objections, Carranza was ordered to establish his headquarters at the Windsor, where his superiors had already set up their offices. Carranza knew this was a bad idea; the hotel wasn't Spanish ground or even under the command and control of Spain, and was open to reservations by members of the public.

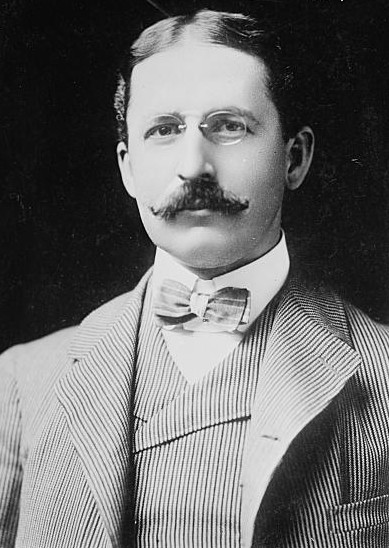
John Elbert Wilkie was Carranza's primary antagonist during the war. To take down Carranza and the Montreal Spy Ring, he had his Secret Service break nearly every law on Canada's books.

The Secret Service reserved the hotel room next door to Carranza, where they drilled holes in the walls and installed listening devices. Whether Carranza knew this is unknown, but in the lobby and the restaurant of the hotel, he was being monitored constantly by British, American, and Canadian intelligence officers. Not only that, the Spanish Legation were being pursued by members of the Canadian press. There were also several Carlist agents staying here, monitoring the activities of the monarchist legation. There were so many intelligence officers in this hotel that they were literally "tripping over each other in the hallways."

In a deliberate effort to mislead American surveillance, Carranza and several other senior Spanish officials publicly departed Montreal, ostensibly bound for Liverpool, England. However, as their ship traveled down the St. Lawrence River, Carranza and a few companions disembarked and secretly returned to the city. Carranza established a new operational headquarters in a house on Tupper Street. His cover was quickly compromised, first by inquisitive Canadian reporters who published news of his return, and then by the presence of an American Secret Service agent, identified only as "Tracer," who also located him at the Tupper Street address.

Ultimately, the intelligence networks of the United States, the British, local Canadian police officers, and the incessant hounding of journalists meant that Montreal was not conducive to his work. The Secret Service intercepted his letters, tapped his telegraphy lines, broke into his hotel rooms and his apartment, hired professional burglars and stole documents right off of his desk, kidnapped and tortured his informants in detention without trial, and most likely murdered one of his best agents. When they couldn't achieve their goals through these efforts, they leaked their information to the press. The consensus within the US intelligence community today is that if Carranza had been allowed to manage his network the way he wanted, without the micromanaging of his superior officers, he might have been successful.

Carranza was forced to leave the city of Montreal by the Canadian government. He had other plans.

=== Carranza plans raiding parties from Victoria ===
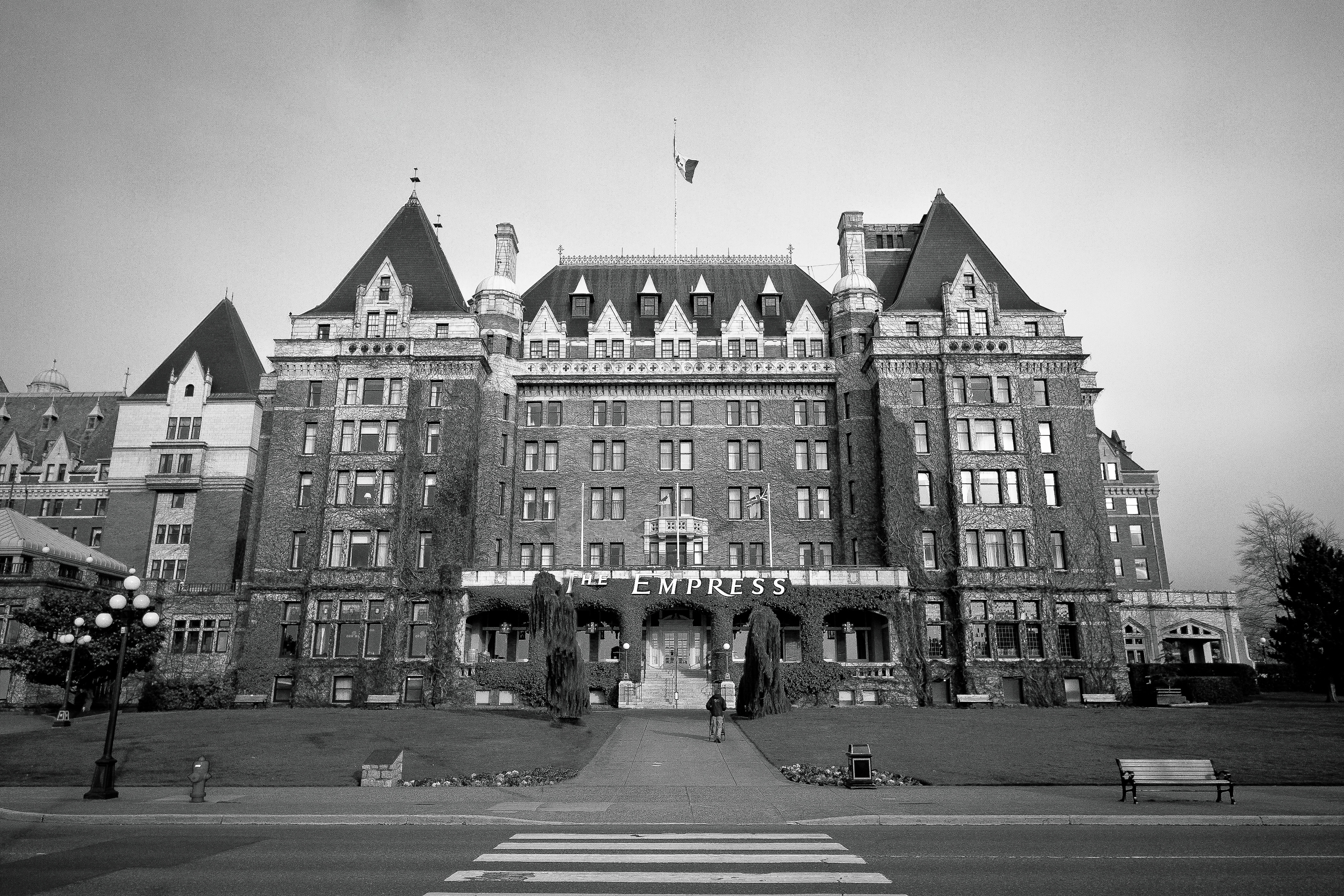
For the last several months of the war, Carranza was based out of Victoria, British Columbia

Carranza, disguised and pursued by both American and British intelligence agents, crossed Canada from east to west. He reached Vancouver on June 30 and took refuge in a private residence in nearby Victoria, arranged by Ángel Cabrejo, the Spanish vice-consul stationed there. Remaining in seclusion and avoiding public attention, Carranza immediately began coordinating his plans. By July 21, two additional agents had joined him.

Carranza's objective was to purchase, arm, and crew a vessel to operate as a merchant raider in the North Pacific. His plan called for attacks on American ships returning from Alaska with gold shipments and on those engaged in sealing and fishing activities. The waters off British Columbia and Alaska were sparsely defended, and Carranza intended to exploit this vulnerability. After completing his raids, the vessel was to head toward Hawaii and Japan, and ultimately to seek internment in the neutral Russian port of Vladivostok.

For his crew, Carranza intended to recruit Spanish civilian sailors who had been captured when Spanish transatlantic liners were seized at the outbreak of the war. These men, held in New York under the protection of the Austro-Hungarian consul, who represented Spanish interests in the United States, numbered over 400. Many possessed naval training and experience with artillery. Carranza's plan was to have them travel to the Pacific Coast under assumed identities as Italian miners bound for Alaska or as Chilean laborers, with the cooperation of Spanish consuls along the route.

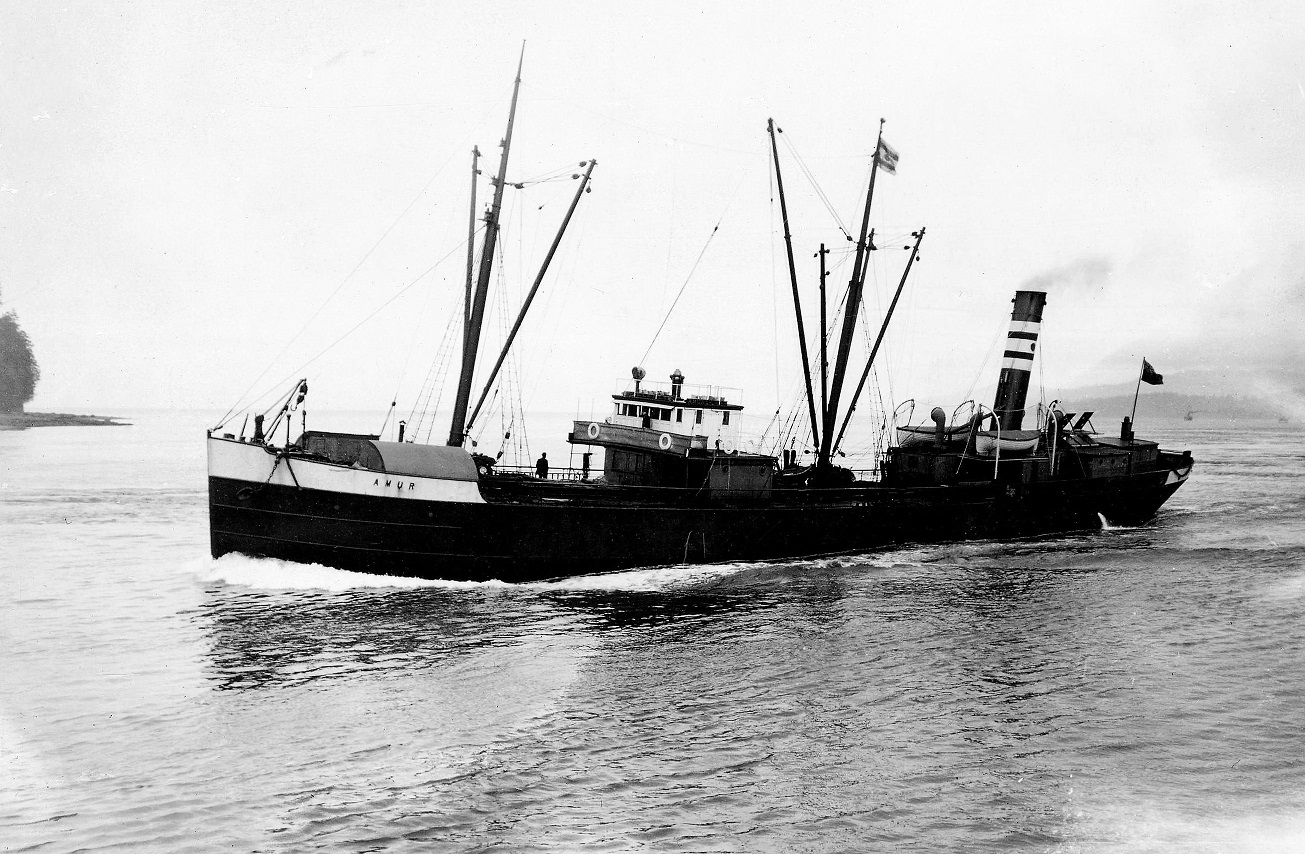
The SS Amur was launched in 1890 by the Amur Steamship Co. In 1898, Carranza acquired the ship to operate it as a Merchant raider.

The ship he selected was the SS Amur, a 900-ton steamer launched in 1890 and capable of 13 knots, faster than the Revenue Cutter Service vessels stationed in the area. He secured it with a deposit of $2,500 toward a total price of $70,000. Weapons were discreetly acquired under the pretense of theatrical use, including two old Winchester cannons, several revolvers, and about thirty boarding sabers.

The plan ultimately collapsed when the Austro-Hungarian consul in New York, facing diplomatic pressure from Ernst Ritter Schmit von Tavera, decided to repatriate the detained Spanish sailors to Spain rather than release them for Carranza's mission. Nevertheless, with only the assistance of the Spanish consul in Vancouver and two agents, Carranza succeeded in diverting the attention of US counterintelligence services and two US Navy cruisers, the Wheeling and the Bennington, which remained stationed in Pacific waters to monitor and protect American shipping throughout the conflict.

He had much greater plans, but before he could launch this near-suicidal venture, Carranza learned that an armistice had been reached and that peace talks between Spain and the United States were beginning. At the same time, he received orders to return to the Iberian Peninsula.

After the war, Carranza reflected that, had a small contingent of Spanish officers, sailors, and marines been sent to Canada before hostilities began, as he had requested, his operation might have succeeded. His resourcefulness and initiative, though unfulfilled, were later recognized by the Spanish government with the award of the Laureate Cross of Saint Ferdinand, the citation for which remained officially undisclosed. In fact, the reasons for his being awarded the Laureate Cross remained so secret in Spain that even Spanish historians today incorrectly assume that he was awarded this for his earlier actions in Cuba.

== Career as a politician ==
On 13 August 1898, Carranza boarded the steamer Scotman bound for Liverpool, bringing his covert mission in Canada and his activities against the United States to an end. From England he continued on to Paris, where he stayed for several days at the home of his relative by marriage, José Moreno de Mora, who owned an impressive residence on the Champs-Élysées. Carranza, like much of the navy, was despondent at the loss of the war, and wondered that if he had been allowed to carry out his plans, the colonies might not have been lost. During long discussions there, Carranza chose to leave naval service and, with Moreno de Mora's support, begin a political career.

His return to Cádiz was noted in the afternoon edition of the Diario de Cádiz on 15 September 1898. Shortly afterward, a formal order transferred him from the active Navy into the Naval Reserves as a voluntary reservist. The Ministry of State then instructed the Navy to record in his service file its appreciation for his tenure as naval attaché in Washington and during his subsequent missions in Canada.

After leaving active naval service, Carranza shifted his focus entirely to political activity and to the business interests. Although his marriage provided him with substantial resources, he pursued commercial ventures rather than relying solely on inherited wealth. He became involved in the tuna-fishing and canning industry, forming a company with several partners, including Serafín Romea of Barbate. Over time, the group acquired fishing rights and associated landholdings in Huelva and Seville and came to control major almadraba operations at Sancti Petri, Isla Cristina, and Barbate. These enterprises employed a significant workforce and operated steamships to support the fishing seasons. He also invested in the regional coal trade, supplying fuel to ships calling at the port of Cádiz.

=== Congress of Deputies (1903–1905) ===
A turning point in Carranza's political career came in 1903, when he entered the Conservative Party. That same year, Carranza entered the Congress of Deputies, filling the vacancy created by the death of Rafael de Muro as the representative for the Algeciras district until 1905.

=== Senate of Spain ===
During the early twentieth century, Spanish politics in Cádiz functioned within the broader framework of the Restoration system established after 1876. Under this arrangement, the Conservative and Liberal parties alternated in government, following the model devised by Antonio Cánovas del Castillo and rivaled by Práxedes Mateo Sagasta. Political life at the local level largely depended on networks of influential families and local power brokers, who controlled elections and distributed favors.

In 1904, Carranza was included on the party's slate for the Cádiz district, reportedly with the backing of Antonio Maura, one of the party's national leaders. This positioned him against the faction aligned with Francisco Silvela, whose local representative in Cádiz was Rafael de la Viesca, head of the provincial organization. Carranza's initial attempt to secure a seat was unsuccessful, but the experience shaped his approach to local politics.

In 1904 a by-election was held in the La Viña district, and Carranza stood as the Conservative candidate. His main opponent was the Republican Miguel Rodríguez-Piñero, a prominent Cádiz figure who later became associated with the Radical Socialist movement. Despite expectations that the Republicans would perform strongly, the election followed the patterns typical of the Restoration era, when caciquismo, the manipulation of electoral procedures by local powerbrokers, was common. Contemporary accounts describe irregularities such as double voting, the use of intimidation, the mobilization of uniformed personnel to cast ballots, the registration of voters from outside the district, and the inclusion of deceased individuals on the rolls.

An anecdote preserved in local press reports illustrates the nature of the contest: at one polling station, Rodríguez Piñero reportedly lamented the state of the voting process, only to witness several intoxicated voters declare they would support “the one who gave us wine,” prompting an amused reaction from Carranza.

Although he sought to maintain a parliamentary career, Cádiz newspapers noted the unusual determination he showed in pursuing elected office, which they interpreted as part of a broader effort to solidify his social and economic position. Cádiz politics at the time had a complex network of local power groups: on one side, the Jerez-based caciques, whose interests were largely commercial, and on the other, the Cádiz-based caciques tied to port operations and warehousing. Each of these blocs contained both Conservative and Liberal factions, creating a fragmented and highly competitive political environment. Within this political culture, Carranza advanced steadily. He secured seats representing several districts, including La Isla and later El Puerto de Santa María, as part of a long-term project to strengthen his local influence. His rise was supported both by his social connections through the Arámburu family, and a complex alliance of Cádiz's conservative and liberal elites; one of his brothers-in-law was the leader of the Conservative Party, and his other brother-in-law was the leader of the Liberal Party.

=== First tenure as Mayor of Cádiz ===
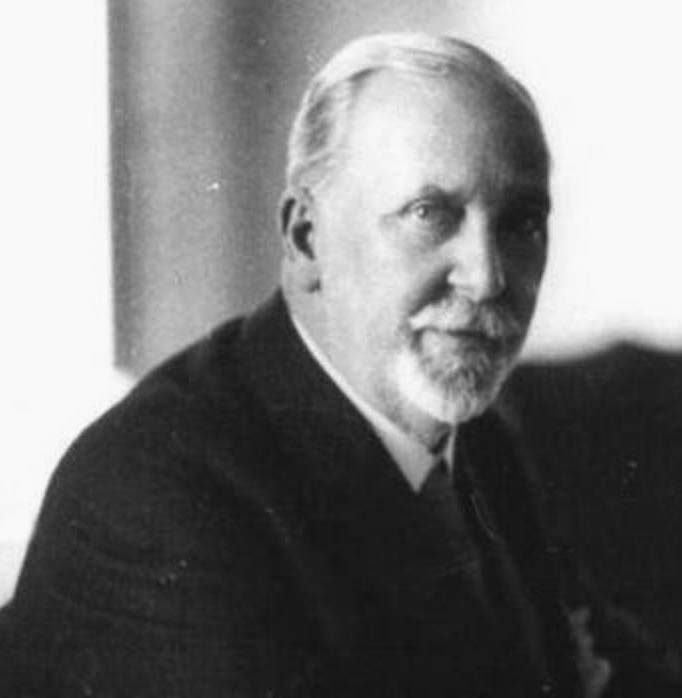
Carranza was reaching his 70's during his first tenure as mayor of Cádiz.

After a brief withdrawal from public life during the years of heightened social conflict following the Russian Revolution, he returned to political prominence during the dictatorship of Miguel Primo de Rivera. Concerns about how Carranza first assumed the mayoralty of Cádiz have attracted consistent historical attention. He held the post twice, each time under an authoritarian regime.

Before Carranza's tenure, the office was held by Agustín Blázquez y Paúl, another influential local businessman whose principal activities also centered on the fishing industry. During his administration, increases in sanitary and fishing taxes provoked opposition from shipowners. Among the most affected was Carranza, who belonged to the Cádiz Shipowners’ Association, which represented more than one hundred vessels. In reaction, shipowners went on a strike of sorts and temporarily diverted their boats to other ports, reducing supplies in Cádiz and generating public discontent.

At the same time, the Chamber of Commerce, led by Carranza's son José León de Carranza, also pressed for a change in municipal leadership. These combined pressures contributed to the perception of administrative failure under Blazquez. News of the conflict reached the central government, where Carranza already enjoyed a favorable relationship with Primo de Rivera, because they had served together in Cuba. Shortly afterward, Blazquez submitted his resignation to the Civil Governor, and Carranza was appointed mayor by government decree.

His appointment formed part of the wider political framework of the dictatorship, in which municipal positions were filled from above rather than through elections. Carranza's circle also had connections with leading figures of the regime, including José María Pemán, one of the principal advocates of the Unión Patriótica, the official party created during Primo de Rivera's rule.

When he assumed office, the municipal finances were already in poor condition. Carranza aligned himself closely with the regime's policy of undertaking large public works as a means of stimulating employment and projecting administrative vitality.

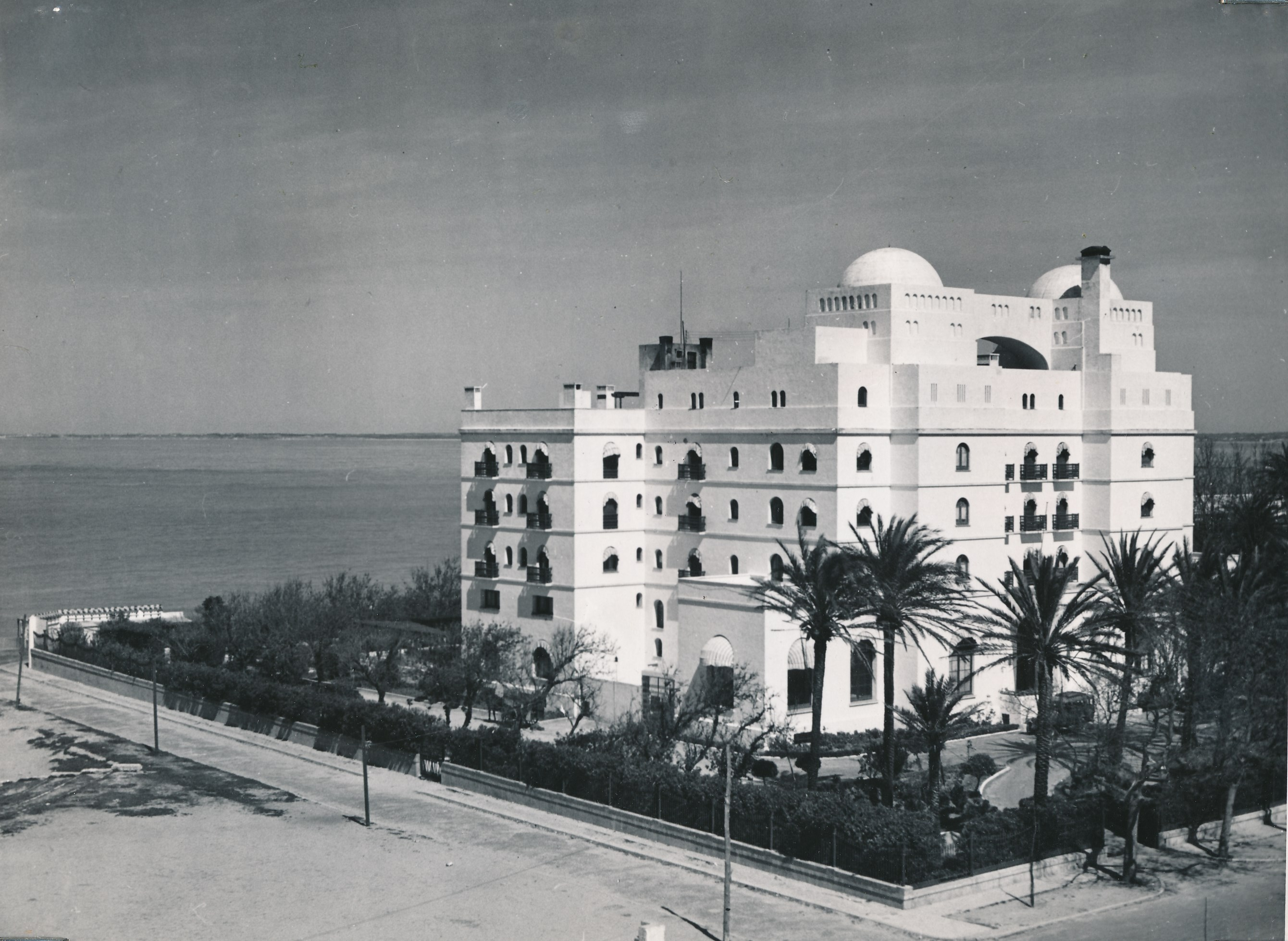
Hotel Atlántico. Cádiz.

This approach produced an ambitious building program, but it also generated severe long-term financial consequences. Among the principal projects promoted during his first term were the completion of outstanding works such as the harbor improvements and the Monument to the Cortes, as well as new constructions including the Post Office building, the Hotel Atlántico, the Bullring of Cádiz, and various municipal facilities. Although these initiatives enhanced his image as an energetic and approachable mayor, research has shown that they were designed largely to benefit the city's economic elite. To finance these projects, the city contracted substantial loans in 1928 and 1929 totaling more than twenty million pesetas, repayable over thirty years. Much of the financial pressure was concealed at the time.

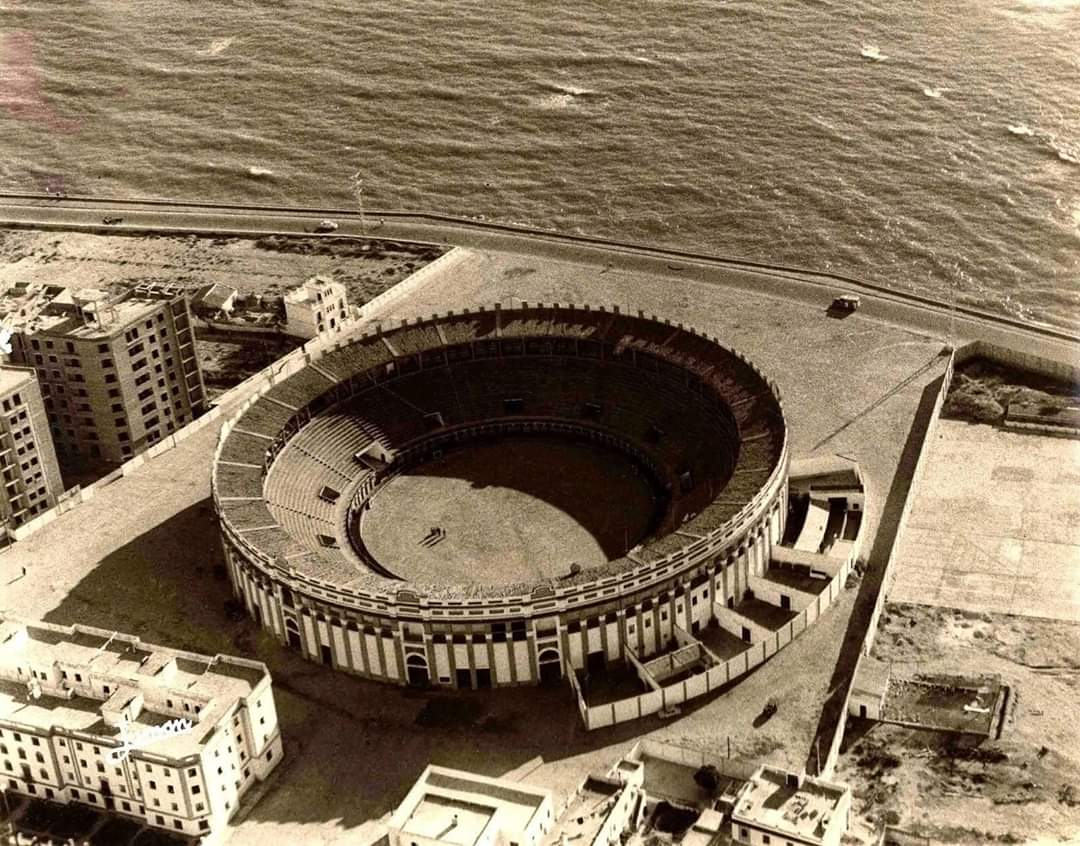
Bullring of Cádiz

Another major feature of Carranza's term was the extensive sale of municipal land in the Extramuros area. Although the city justified the auctions as a means of raising funds without increasing taxes, the properties were purchased at prices below market value by members of the local aristocracy and business elite, including Carranza and several prominent families. This land speculation allowed Carranza to expand his own holdings while holding the mayoralty. During the same period, he also became involved in several business ventures, including tramway concessions and food processing enterprises.

The Wall Street Crash of 1929 intensified the city's fiscal difficulties, and by the early 1930s Cádiz faced heavy debt and limited financial capacity. When the Second Spanish Republic was established in 1931, municipal audits confirmed the scale of the deficit and raised concerns about financial mismanagement under the previous administration. These investigations revealed liabilities far higher than those originally acknowledged, ultimately amounting to more than ninety million pesetas.

Carranza remained in office throughout the final phase of the dictatorship's dictablanda even as other municipal governments throughout Spain were replaced. In the municipal elections of April 1931, held as part of King Alfonso XIII's attempt to transition back to constitutional government, monarchist candidates were defeated in nearly all major cities. Cádiz was one of the few exceptions, due largely to the entrenched system of political patronage and local control managed by Carranza. Nevertheless, after the proclamation of the Second Republic, the elections were repeated, Carranza lost his position, and Emilio de Sola Ramons became the first republican mayor of the city.

=== Cortes Generales ===
During the final years of the monarchy, Ramón de Carranza's political position in Cádiz weakened sharply. Contemporary newspapers reported that, during the municipal elections, he reacted angrily to the distribution of republican and socialist ballots and urged his supporters to destroy them. His temperament became the subject of press comment, and later accounts describe an episode in which, while serving briefly as the senior member of the municipal council during a ceremonial session, he refused to utter the phrase “Long live the Republic,” replying instead that he “did not feel like it.”

When the republican candidate Emilio de Sola was elected mayor in May 1931, Carranza declined to attend the formal handover of office, breaking with customary practice. In the first months of the Second Republic he withdrew somewhat from public life and concentrated on his private business interests.

However, the monarchist camp soon reorganized, and Carranza quickly returned to political activity. He helped establish the local branch of Renovación Española, a right-wing monarchist party, and was elected to the Cortes Generales in the 1933 general elections. He again stood as a candidate in the elections of February 1936 as part of the Anti-Revolutionary Front, a coalition of conservative groups; although the right lost nationally, he secured a deputy's seat for the province.

Historians generally agree that Carranza was directly involved in the planning of the military conspiracy that preceded the Spanish Civil War. While a deputy, he maintained contact with General José Sanjurjo, who had already attempted a failed uprising in August 1932 and later organized plans for a new revolt from exile. Testimonies from figures on the political right, including the Marquis of Tamarón, founder of the Falange in the Campo de Gibraltar, state that Carranza participated in preparatory meetings in Cádiz alongside associates such as Eduardo Aranda Quirino.

When the Spanish coup of July 1936 began, Carranza was not in Cádiz; contemporary sources place him in Seville. Cádiz itself was seized on 19 July by forces under Colonel Enrique Varela, who arrived from the Moroccan Protectorate and defeated the initial resistance led by the Civil Governor, Mariano Zapico. Some neighborhoods continued to resist briefly, but once the city was fully controlled by the insurgents, Carranza returned by naval vessel, landed at the Playa de la Victoria, and was installed once again as mayor; this time by the authority of the military rebels rather than through any electoral process.

=== Second term as Mayor of Cádiz and Civil Governor ===
During the first phase of the Franco regime, Carranza returned as mayor of Cádiz, although his second term lasted only about a year. His son played a central role in securing his appointment. Once in office, he attempted to revive policies he had used during the Primo de Rivera dictatorship, especially the practice of selling municipal land outside the old city walls to generate revenue. Similar sales had been attempted under the Second Republic at market prices but had failed because major landowners, including Carranza himself, refused to bid. Under Carranza, the plots were again offered at lower values, echoing the earlier approach of his first term.

His second mayoralty took place amid the violence and repression associated with the outbreak of the Civil War. For a short period he held both the mayoralty and the office of Civil Governor, giving him broad authority over the city's administration. Soon after taking office he initiated extensive purges of municipal employees; more than one hundred workers lost their jobs. He encouraged the provincial council to undertake similar actions, and the last president of the council, Francisco Cossi, was later killed.

In November, Carranza asked Francisco Franco to secure him appointment as admiral of the Nationalist fleet, though Franco turned him down.

The harshest phase of repression in Cádiz occurred between the summer of 1936 and the first half of 1937. Numerous residents were executed without judicial proceedings in various locations across the city. As military courts began operating in early 1937, the mayor became one of the officials who supplied background reports on defendants, alongside representatives of the Falange, Carlist groups, and the local clergy. Surviving records show his participation in these proceedings, including cases that resulted in long prison sentences or executions.

Carranza's final period in office coincided with what historians describe as the Hot Terror of Cádiz, during which hundreds of people, estimates range from roughly 500 to 800, were killed by rebel forces in the initial months of the conflict.

== Later years and death ==
A sudden illness led him to resign the mayoralty on 16 July 1937, and he died on 13 September at his home on Ancha Street at the age of seventy-four. At his own request, he was not given military honours or a military funeral.

== Legacy ==
- One of his sons, José León de Carranza, became the longest-serving mayor of Cádiz under the Franco Regime.
  - In 1955, while his son José was serving as mayor of Cádiz, Estadio Ramón de Carranza was named in Carranza's honor. According to the Historical Memory Law, the name of the stadium was changed to Nuevo Mirandilla Stadium due to the negative connotations of Carranza's connection to Franco.
- One of his other sons, José León de Carranza, became the mayor of Seville and also the President of the Sevilla FC.
  - The Ramón de Carranza Trophy was named in Carranza's honor.
