= Nuevo Mirandilla =

Football stadium in Cádiz, Spain

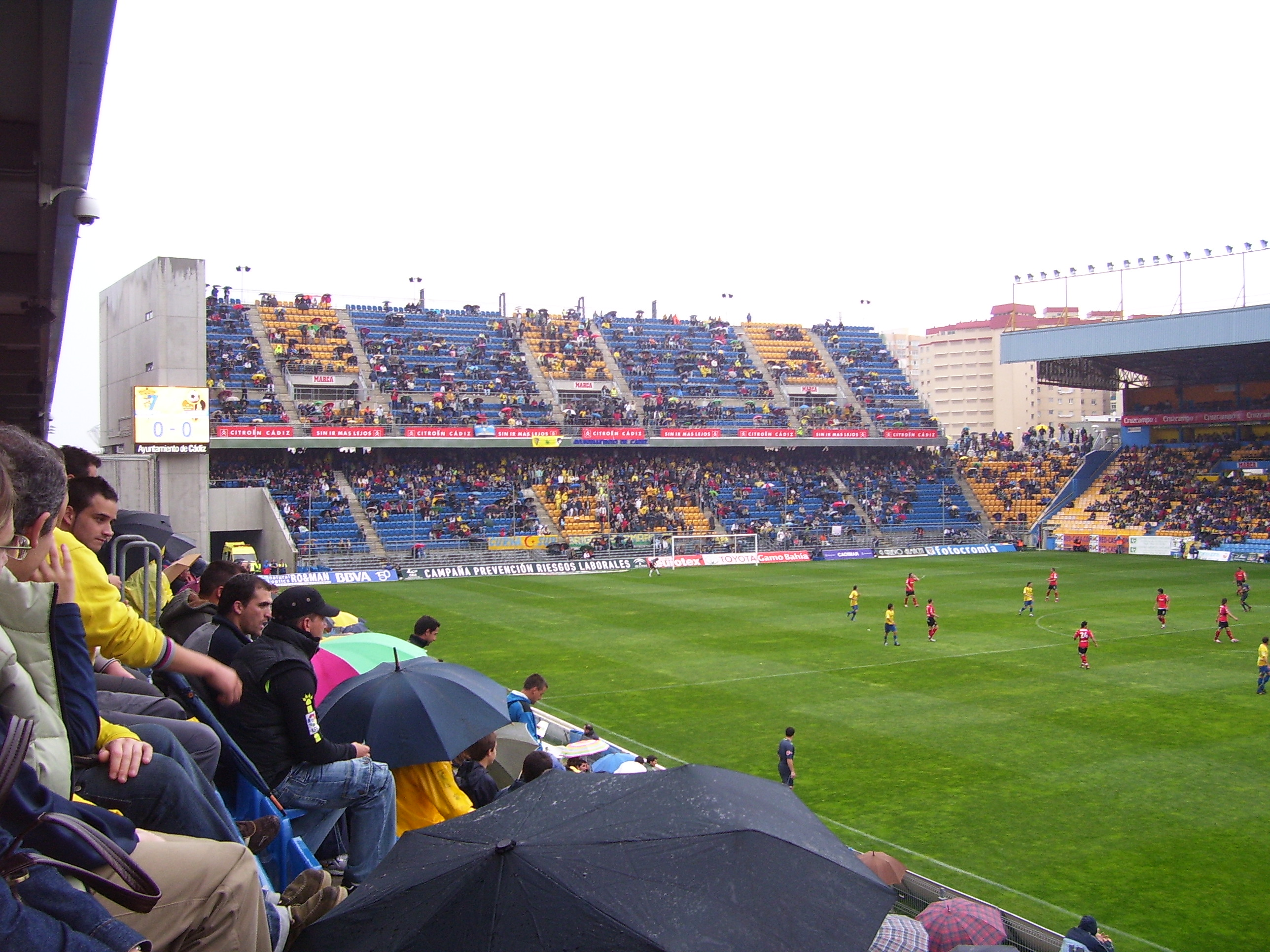
- Interactive map of Nuevo Mirandilla
- Full name: Estadio Nuevo Mirandilla
- Former names: Estadio Ramón de Carranza (1955–2021)
- Location: Plaza de Madrid, s/n 11010 Cádiz
- Coordinates: 36°30′10″N 6°16′23″W
- Owner: Ayuntamiento de Cádiz
- Capacity: 20,724
- Surface: Grass
- Field size: 106 m × 68 m (348 ft × 223 ft)

Construction
- Opened: 3 September 1955
- Renovated: 1984 and 2003–2012
- Architects: Manuel Muñoz Monasterio; Fernández Pujol

Tenants
- Cádiz CF (1955–present); Spain national football team (selected matches)

Nuevo Mirandilla, also referred as JP Financial Estadio for sponsorship reasons, is a football stadium in Cádiz, Spain. The stadium is the home ground of Cádiz CF. The stadium was originally inaugurated as Estadio Ramón de Carranza on 3 September 1955. It has since then been completely rebuilt twice. With a capacity of 20,724 seats, it is the 24th-largest stadium in Spain and the 5th-largest in Andalusia.

== History ==
Nuevo Mirandilla stands on the grounds of a former multidisciplinary sports complex where Cádiz CF played known as Campo de Deportes de Mirandilla, in the Mirandilla neighborhood of Cádiz. However that old Mirandilla stadium was destroyed in the 1947 Cádiz explosion. The club decided to begin construction on a new stadium shortly afterward. With a total capacity of 15,000 spectators, the new Mirandilla stadium was built with an oval shape and included a 400-metre athletics track between the pitch and the stands.

The mayor of Cádiz at the time was José León de Carranza, the longest-serving mayor of the city during the Franco regime. His father, Ramón de Carranza y Fernández Reguera, another former mayor of the city, was chosen as the namesake of the stadium.

On 6 August 1955, the national flag was raised at the stadium in the presence of José León de Carranza, Cazalla Morales (responsible for the work), the architects in charge; Muñoz Monasterio and Fernández Pujol, and the president and the vice president of Cádiz CF (Juan Ramón Cilleruelo Montero and Rafael García Serrano).

The stadium was inaugurated 3 September 1955. The inaugural match was played against FC Barcelona, that ended in a loss of 0–4. With two goals from Villaverde, then Luis Suárez then a final goal from Kubala.

The first rebuilding of the stadium took place in 1984, over the course of 4 months the main stand was demolished and rebuilt and the other stands were redesigned, at the same time the athletics track was removed and the pitch was moved closer to the stands. The rebuilt stadium included a roof over the main stand. The stadium capacity after the first rebuilding was 23,000. On 8 February 2002, the mayor of the city, Teófila Martínez, presented the first real project for the New Carranza. One of its key points was the enlargement of the commercial areas in the stadium, which total surface was estimated at 5,000 square meter.

The second rebuilding of the stadium took place between 2003 and 2012 when all four stands were demolished and rebuilt starting with the south stand (Fondo Sur) and the east stand (Preferente) between 2003 and 2005. Then the north stand (Fondo Norte) was rebuilt between 2006 and 2008. The last stand to be rebuilt was the main stand (Tribuna) which is the largest one with 8,281 seats and thus far the only one with a roof, the construction took place between 2009 and 2012.

The new stadium with a capacity of 25,033 spectators has a total built up area of 94,938 square metres, it includes 31,555 m^{2} of underground parking for around 900 cars under the four stands, commercial areas located throughout the stadium totaling 23,349 m^{2}, and 28,714 m^{2} are used for a hotel located in the main stand. The total cost of the rebuilding was €68 million, all paid for with public funds. The Spain national football team for the first time played an official match on the Ramón de Carranza against Malta in UEFA Euro 2020 qualifying on 15 November 2019. The game ended with a 7:0 Spain victory.

== Name change ==
On June 24, 2021, the stadium was renamed Nuevo Mirandilla to comply with Spain's Historical Memory Law. Ramón de Carranza was mayor of the city during a period of great violence during the Spanish Civil War, and the families of the victims of the fascist era and the Franco regime desired that the stadium changed its name. While Ramón de Carranza was named after a person, the new name simply means "new little watchtower." Miranda being the Latin word for watchtower (there are 134 watchtowers in Cádiz), and illa being a suffix in Spanish to mean small. Mirandilla was the old name for the neighborhood where the old sports complex stood.

In July 2024, Cádiz C.F. requested the city council to change the name back to Estadio Carranza. The club and the council argued that using only "Carranza" instead of the full name "Ramón de Carranza" severs the link to the original person and now only refers to the stadium itself.

This move was met with immediate opposition. The citizen platform "Carranza Incumple" was formed, arguing that one cannot erase 66 years of history by simply omitting a first name, and that "Carranza" will always be associated with Ramón de Carranza. Further opposition came from municipal opposition parties, the regional government sub-delegation, the Ministry of Territorial Policy, and Democratic Memory associations, all of which warned that reverting to the name Carranza is a fraudulent attempt to circumvent the law.
