= 1991 Seville municipal election =

Election in the Spanish municipality of Seville

- 26 May 1991

All 31 seats in the City Council of Seville 16 seats needed for a majority
- Opinion polls
- Registered: 512,308 ▲7.0%
- Turnout: 280,996 (54.8%) ▼6.5 pp
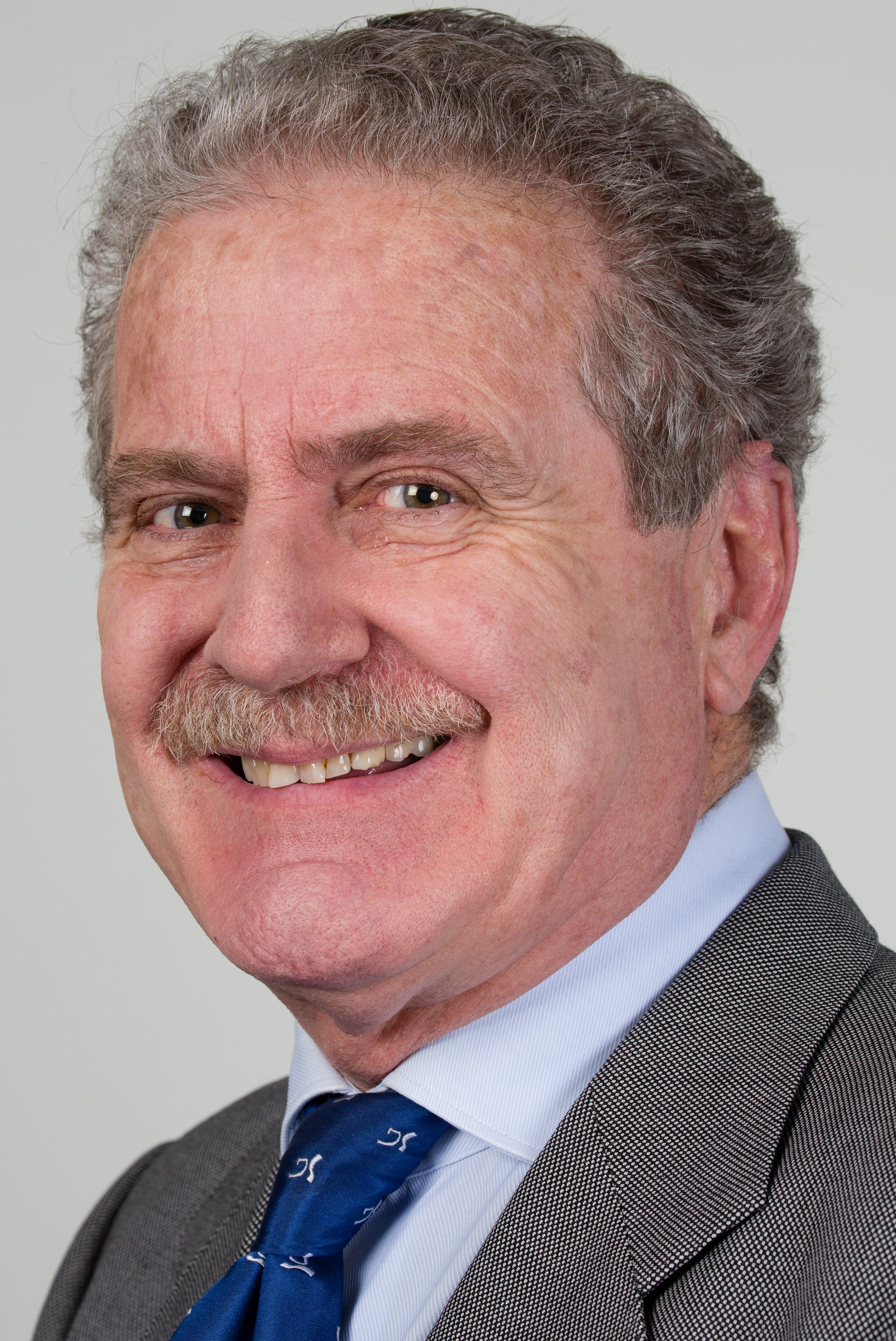

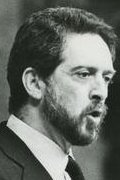

	First party	Second party	Third party
Leader	Luis Yáñez-Barnuevo	Alejandro Rojas-Marcos	Soledad Becerril
Party	PSOE–A	PA	PP
Leader since	1 March 1991	29 August 1986	24 March 1987
Last election	13 seats, 38.7%	7 seats, 20.9%	8 seats, 25.5% (Note: Results for AP (24.6%, 8 seats) and PDP (0.9%, 0 seats) in the 1987 election.)
Seats won	12	9	8
Seat change	▼1	▲2	0
Popular vote	108,028	77,168	71,287
Percentage	38.6%	27.6%	24.4%
Swing	▼0.1 pp	▲6.7 pp	▼1.1 pp
	Fourth party
Leader	Rosa Bendala
Party	IU–CA
Leader since	1991
Last election	3 seats, 9.2%
Seats won	2
Seat change	▼1
Popular vote	19,216
Percentage	6.9%
Swing	▼2.3 pp
Mayor before election
Manuel del Valle
PSOE
Mayor after election
Alejandro Rojas-Marcos
PA

A municipal election was held in Seville on 26 May 1991 to elect the 4th City Council of the municipality. All 31 seats in the City Council were up for election. It was held concurrently with regional elections in thirteen autonomous communities and local elections all across Spain.

== Overview ==
Under the 1978 Constitution, the governance of municipalities in Spain—part of the country's local government system—was centered on the figure of city councils (Spanish: ayuntamientos), local corporations with independent legal personality composed of a mayor, a government council and an elected legislative assembly. The mayor was indirectly elected by the local assembly, requiring an absolute majority; otherwise, the candidate from the most-voted party automatically became mayor (ties were resolved by drawing lots). In the case of Seville, the top-tier administrative and governing body was the City Council of Seville.

=== Date ===
The term of local assemblies in Spain expired four years after the date of their previous election, with amendments earlier in 1991 fixing election day for the fourth Sunday of May every four years. The election decree was required to be issued between 54 and 60 days before the scheduled election date and published on the following day in the Official State Gazette (BOE). The previous local elections were held on 10 June 1987, setting the date for election day on the fourth Sunday of May four years later, which was 26 May 1991.

Local assemblies could not be dissolved before the expiration of their term, except in cases of mismanagement that seriously harmed the public interest and implied a breach of constitutional obligations, in which case the Council of Ministers could—optionally—decide to call a by-election.

Elections to the assemblies of local entities were officially called on 2 April 1991 with the publication of the corresponding decree in the BOE, setting election day for 26 May.

=== Electoral system ===
Voting for local assemblies was based on universal suffrage, comprising all Spanish nationals over 18 years of age, registered and residing in the municipality and with full political rights (provided that they had not been deprived of the right to vote by a final sentence, nor were legally incapacitated), as well as resident non-nationals whose country of origin allowed reciprocal voting by virtue of a treaty.

Local councillors were elected using the D'Hondt method and closed-list proportional voting, with a five percent-threshold of valid votes (including blank ballots) in each municipality. Each municipality was a multi-member constituency, with a number of seats based on the following scale:

Population	Councillors
<250	5
251–1,000	7
1,001–2,000	9
2,001–5,000	11
5,001–10,000	13
10,001–20,000	17
20,001–50,000	21
50,001–100,000	25
>100,001	+1 per each 100,000 inhabitants or fraction +1 if total is an even number

The law did not provide for by-elections to fill vacant seats; instead, any vacancies arising after the proclamation of candidates and during the legislative term were filled by the next candidates on the party lists or, when required, by designated substitutes.

== Parties and candidates ==
The electoral law allowed for parties and federations registered in the interior ministry, alliances and groupings of electors to present lists of candidates. Parties and federations intending to form an alliance were required to inform the relevant electoral commission within 10 days of the election call, whereas groupings of electors needed to secure the signature of a determined amount of the electors registered in the municipality for which they sought election, disallowing electors from signing for more than one list. In the case of Seville, as its population was between 300,001 and 1,000,000, at least 5,000 signatures were required.

Below is a list of the main parties and alliances which contested the election:

Candidacy	Parties and alliances	Leading candidate	Ideology	Previous result		Gov.	Ref.
Candidacy	Parties and alliances	Leading candidate	Ideology	Vote %	Seats	Gov.	Ref.
PSOE–A	List: Spanish Socialist Workers' Party of Andalusia (PSOE–A)	Luis Yáñez-Barnuevo	Social democracy	38.7%	13	Yes	
PP	List: People's Party (PP)	Soledad Becerril	Conservatism; Christian democracy	25.5%	8	No	
PA	List: Andalusian Party (PA)	Alejandro Rojas-Marcos	Andalusian nationalism Social democracy	20.9%	7	No	
IU–CA	List: Communist Party of Andalusia (PCA); Socialist Action Party (PASOC); Republican Left (IR); Collectives for the Unity of Workers (CUT)	Rosa Bendala	Socialism; Communism	9.2%	3	No	

== Opinion polls ==
The tables below list opinion polling results in reverse chronological order, showing the most recent first and using the dates when the survey fieldwork was done, as opposed to the date of publication. Where the fieldwork dates are unknown, the date of publication is given instead. The highest percentage figure in each polling survey is displayed with its background shaded in the leading party's colour. If a tie ensues, this is applied to the figures with the highest percentages. The "Lead" column on the right shows the percentage-point difference between the parties with the highest percentages in a poll.

=== Voting intention estimates ===
The table below lists weighted voting intention estimates. Refusals are generally excluded from the party vote percentages, while question wording and the treatment of "don't know" responses and those not intending to vote may vary between polling organisations. When available, seat projections determined by the polling organisations are displayed below (or in place of) the percentages in a smaller font; 16 seats were required for an absolute majority in the City Council of Seville.

Polling firm/Commissioner	Fieldwork date	Sample size	Turnout	PSOE–A	AP	PA	IU–CA	CDS	PDP	LV	PP	ARM	Lead
1991 municipal election	26 May 1991	—N/a	54.8	38.6; 12	(Note: Within PP.)	27.6; 9	6.9; 2	0.3; 0		1.0; 0	24.4; 8	–	11.0
DYM/Cambio 16	20 May 1991	?	?	40.4; 13/14		22.4; 7/8	7.8; 2	1.1; 0		–	24.4; 8	–	16.0
Gruppo/ABC	13–15 May 1991	1,000	?	36.7; 12/13		25.3; 8	8.9; 2/3	–		–	24.4; 8	–	11.4
Opina/La Vanguardia	13–14 May 1991	1,003	?	38.5; 12/13		24.5; 8/9	9.0; 3	1.0; 0		–	24.0; 8/9	–	14.0
Metra Seis/El Independiente	12 May 1991	?	?	39.0; 13		23.3; 7/8	9.1; 3	1.0; 0		–	23.0; 7/8	–	15.7
Demoscopia/El País	4–7 May 1991	?	?	36.4; 12/13		22.4; 7/8	8.8; 3	2.0; 0		4.0; 0	25.2; 8/9	–	11.2
Gruppo/ABC	26 Apr–2 May 1991	1,000	?	34.4; 11/12		26.7; 8/9	9.3; 3	–		–	24.1; 8	–	7.7
PP	18–22 Mar 1991	1,111	?	? 10/11		? 8/9	? 2	–		–	? 10	–	?
1990 regional election	23 Jun 1990	—N/a	50.5	40.2 (13)		17.8 (6)	11.0 (3)	0.3 (0)		0.8 (0)	26.7 (9)	0.3 (0)	13.5
1989 general election	29 Oct 1989	—N/a	67.0	43.5 (15)		11.9 (4)	11.2 (2)	2.1 (0)		0.9 (0)	26.5 (9)	1.3 (0)	17.0
1989 EP election	15 Jun 1989	—N/a	49.8	40.5 (14)		14.4 (5)	8.0 (2)	2.0 (0)		1.2 (0)	22.5 (8)	5.7 (2)	18.0
Metra Seis/PA	1–22 Dec 1988	?	?	26.0	19.0	32.0	14.0	4.0	–	–	–	–	6.0
1987 municipal election	10 Jun 1987	—N/a	61.3	38.7; 13	24.6; 8	20.9; 7	9.2; 3	2.4; 0	0.9; 0	0.6; 0	–	–	14.1

== Results ==
← Summary of the 26 May 1991 City Council of Seville election results →
Parties and alliances	Popular vote			Seats	
Parties and alliances	Votes	%	±pp	Total	+/−
Spanish Socialist Workers' Party of Andalusia (PSOE–A)	108,028	38.57	−0.18	12	−1
Andalusian Party (PA)	77,168	27.55	+6.70	9	+2
People's Party (PP)^{1}	68,206	24.35	−1.13	8	±0
United Left–Assembly for Andalusia (IU–CA)	19,216	6.86	−2.30	2	−1
The Greens of Andalusia (LVA)	2,714	0.97	+0.37	0	±0
Democratic and Social Centre (CDS)	877	0.31	−2.09	0	±0
The Greens Ecologist–Humanist List (LVLE–H)^{2}	857	0.31	+0.25	0	±0
Workers' Socialist Party (PST)	547	0.20	New	0	±0
Spanish Phalanx of the CNSO (FE–JONS)	280	0.10	New	0	±0
Andalusian Popular Unity (UPAN)	216	0.08	New	0	±0
Blank ballots	2,217	0.79	−0.04		
Total	280,089			31	±0
Valid votes	280,089	99.68	+0.87		
Invalid votes	907	0.32	−0.87		
Votes cast / turnout	280,996	54.85	−6.44		
Abstentions	231,312	45.15	+6.44		
Registered voters	512,308				
Sources
Footnotes: ^{1} People's Party results are compared to the combined totals of People's Alliance and People's Democratic Party in the 1987 election.; ^{2} The Greens Ecologist–Humanist List results are compared to Humanist Platform totals in the 1987 election.

Popular vote
PSOE–A	38.57%
PA	27.55%
PP	24.35%
IU–CA	6.86%
Others	1.96%
Blank ballots	0.79%

Seats
PSOE–A	38.71%
PA	29.03%
PP	25.81%
IU–CA	6.45%

== Aftermath ==
=== Government formation ===
Investiture
Ballot →	15 June 1991	
Required majority →	16 out of 31	
Alejandro Rojas-Marcos (PA): • PA (9); • PP (8)	17 / 31	check
Luis Yáñez-Barnuevo (PSOE–A): • PSOE–A (12)	12 / 31	X mark
Rosa Bendala (IU–CA): • IU–CA (2)	2 / 31	X mark
Abstentions/Blank ballots	0 / 31	
Absentees	0 / 31	

== Bibliography ==
- Constitución Española (Constitution). Official State Gazette (in Spanish). 27 December 1978 [version as of 29 December 1978]. BOE-A-1978-31229.
- Ley 7/1985, de 2 de abril, Reguladora de las Bases del Régimen Local (Law 7/1985). Official State Gazette (in Spanish). 2 April 1985 [version as of 27 March 1991]. BOE-A-1985-5392.
- Ley Orgánica 5/1985, de 19 de junio, del Régimen Electoral General (Organic Law 5/1985). Official State Gazette (in Spanish). 19 June 1985 [version as of 14 March 1991]. BOE-A-1985-11672.
- Real Decreto 391/1991, de 1 de abril, de convocatoria de elecciones locales (Royal Decree 391/1991). Official State Gazette (in Spanish). 1 April 1991. BOE-A-1991-7959.
