= 1983 Seville municipal election =

Election in the Spanish municipality of Seville

- 8 May 1983

All 31 seats in the City Council of Seville 16 seats needed for a majority
- Opinion polls
- Registered: 454,851 ▲6.3%
- Turnout: 274,080 (60.3%) ▲3.3 pp

	First party	Second party	Third party
Leader	Manuel del Valle	Pedro Albert Lasierra	Javier Aristu
Party	PSOE–A	AP–PDP–UL	PCE
Leader since	1983	—	—
Last election	8 seats, 24.8%	0 seats, 1.2% (Note: Data for CD in the 1979 election.)	6 seats, 18.4%
Seats won	19	10	2
Seat change	▲11	▲10	▼4
Popular vote	153,002	80,542	24,099
Percentage	56.2%	29.6%	8.9%
Swing	▲31.4 pp	▲28.4 pp	▼9.5 pp
Mayor before election
Luis Uruñuela
PSA–PA
Mayor after election
Manuel del Valle
PSOE

A municipal election was held in Seville on 8 May 1983 to elect the 2nd City Council of the municipality. All 31 seats in the City Council were up for election. It was held concurrently with regional elections in thirteen autonomous communities and local elections all across Spain.

== Overview ==
Under the 1978 Constitution, the governance of municipalities in Spain—part of the country's local government system—was centered on the figure of city councils (Spanish: ayuntamientos), local corporations with independent legal personality composed of a mayor, a government council and an elected legislative assembly. The mayor was indirectly elected by the local assembly, requiring an absolute majority; otherwise, the candidate from the most-voted party automatically became mayor (ties were resolved by drawing lots). In the case of Seville, the top-tier administrative and governing body was the City Council of Seville.

=== Date ===
The term of local assemblies in Spain expired four years after the date of their previous election. The election decree was required to be issued no later than the day after the expiration date of the assemblies, with election day taking place within from 55 to 70 days after the decree's publication in the Official State Gazette (BOE).

Elections to the assemblies of local entities were officially called on 10 March 1983 with the publication of the corresponding decree in the BOE, setting election day for 8 May.

=== Electoral system ===
Voting for local assemblies was based on universal suffrage, comprising all Spanish nationals over 18 years of age, registered and residing in the municipality and with full civil and political rights.

Local councillors were elected using the D'Hondt method and closed-list proportional voting, with a five percent-threshold of valid votes (including blank ballots) in each municipality. Each municipality was a multi-member constituency, with a number of seats based on the following scale:

Population	Councillors
<250	5
251–1,000	7
1,001–2,000	9
2,001–5,000	11
5,001–10,000	13
10,001–20,000	17
20,001–50,000	21
50,001–100,000	25
>100,001	+1 per each 100,000 inhabitants or fraction +1 if total is an even number

The law did not provide for by-elections to fill vacant seats; instead, any vacancies arising after the proclamation of candidates and during the legislative term were filled by the next candidates on the party lists or, when required, by designated substitutes.

== Opinion polls ==
The tables below list opinion polling results in reverse chronological order, showing the most recent first and using the dates when the survey fieldwork was done, as opposed to the date of publication. Where the fieldwork dates are unknown, the date of publication is given instead. The highest percentage figure in each polling survey is displayed with its background shaded in the leading party's colour. If a tie ensues, this is applied to the figures with the highest percentages. The "Lead" column on the right shows the percentage-point difference between the parties with the highest percentages in a poll.

=== Voting preferences ===
The table below lists raw, unweighted voting preferences.

Polling firm/Commissioner	Fieldwork date	Sample size	UCD	PSOE	PSA–PA	PCA–PCE	AP–PDP–UL	CDS	Question	X mark	Lead
1983 municipal election	8 May 1983	—N/a	–	33.6	1.8	5.3	17.7	0.7	—N/a	40.4	15.9
Alef–Emopública/CIS	17–25 Mar 1983	497	0.6	59.3	–	3.0	11.5	0.2	14.9	4.8	47.8
1982 general election	28 Oct 1982	—N/a	2.1	47.1	2.5	4.5	21.2 (Note: Results for CD (1979), AP (May 1982) and AP–PDP (October 1982).)	0.8	—N/a	18.1	25.9
1982 regional election	28 Oct 1982	—N/a	4.6	33.9	4.0	5.0	15.7	–	—N/a	34.1	18.2
1979 municipal election	3 Apr 1979	—N/a	15.4	14.0	13.3	10.4	0.7	–	—N/a	43.0	1.4

== Results ==
← Summary of the 8 May 1983 City Council of Seville election results →
Parties and alliances	Popular vote			Seats	
Parties and alliances	Votes	%	±pp	Total	+/−
Spanish Socialist Workers' Party of Andalusia (PSOE–A)	153,002	56.22	+31.44	19	+11
People's Coalition (AP–PDP–UL)^{1}	80,542	29.60	+28.43	10	+10
Communist Party of Spain (PCE)	24,099	8.86	−9.57	2	−4
Socialist Party of Andalusia–Andalusian Party (PSA–PA)	8,080	2.97	−20.51	0	−8
Democratic and Social Centre (CDS)	3,191	1.17	New	0	±0
Spanish Communist Workers' Party (PCOE)	1,460	0.54	−0.11	0	±0
United Candidacy of Workers (CUT)	540	0.20	New	0	±0
Union of the Democratic Centre (UCD)	n/a	n/a	−27.09	0	−9
Blank ballots	1,221	0.45	+0.32		
Total	272,135			31	±0
Valid votes	272,135	99.29	−0.21		
Invalid votes	1,945	0.71	+0.21		
Votes cast / turnout	274,080	60.26	+3.28		
Abstentions	180,771	39.74	−3.28		
Registered voters	454,851				
Sources
Footnotes: ^{1} People's Coalition results are compared to Democratic Coalition totals in the 1979 election.

Popular vote
PSOE–A	56.22%
AP–PDP–UL	29.60%
PCE	8.86%
PSA–PA	2.97%
CDS	1.17%
Others	0.73%
Blank ballots	0.45%

Seats
PSOE–A	61.29%
AP–PDP–UL	32.26%
PCE	6.45%

== Aftermath ==
=== Government formation ===
Investiture
Ballot →	23 May 1983	
Required majority →	16 out of 31	
Manuel del Valle (PSOE–A): • PSOE–A (19)	19 / 31	check
Pedro Albert Lasierra (AP–PDP–UL): • AP–PDP–UL (10)	10 / 31	X mark
Javier Aristu (PCE): • PCE (2)	2 / 31	X mark
Abstentions/Blank ballots	0 / 31	
Absentees	0 / 31	

== Bibliography ==
- Ley 41/1975, de 19 de noviembre, de Bases del Estatuto de Régimen Local (Law 41/1975). Official State Gazette (in Spanish). 19 November 1975. BOE-A-1975-23920.
- Ley 39/1978, de 17 de julio, de elecciones locales (Law 39/1978). Official State Gazette (in Spanish). 17 July 1978. BOE-A-1978-18636.
- Constitución Española (Constitution). Official State Gazette (in Spanish). 27 December 1978 [version as of 29 December 1978]. BOE-A-1978-31229.
- Ley Orgánica 6/1983, de 2 de marzo, por la que se modifican determinados artículos de la Ley 39/1978, de 17 de julio, de Elecciones Locales (Organic Law 6/1983). Official State Gazette (in Spanish). 2 March 1983. BOE-A-1983-6573.
- Real Decreto 448/1983, de 9 de marzo, de convocatoria de Elecciones Locales (Royal Decree 448/1983). Official State Gazette (in Spanish). 9 March 1983. BOE-A-1983-7296.
