= Pilar González Modino =

Spanish politician (born 1962)

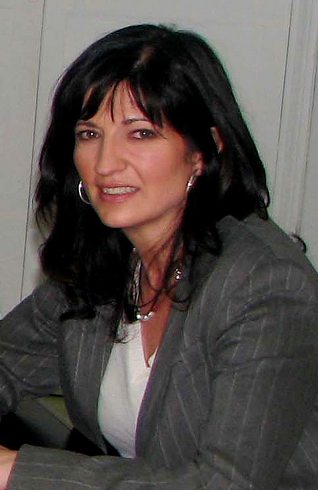

María Pilar González Modino (born 1962) is a Spanish former politician. As a member of the Andalusian Party (PA), she was a councillor on the City Council of Seville from 2004 to 2005, then a deputy in the Parliament of Andalusia from 2005 to 2008. From 2008 to 2012, she was secretary general of the party, but missed out on election at local and regional level.

After her resignation from PA, González set up Primavera Andaluza, which joined the first Adelante Andalucía. She was elected to the council in Dos Hermanas in 2019, and resigned after being named to the Senate of Spain later that year. She retired after missing out on election to the Congress of Deputies for the second Adelante Andalucía in 2023.

== Biography ==
=== Early life and career ===
González was born in Mérida in Extremadura. When she was 6, her 37-year-old father died in an accident, and her grandmother took responsibility for the household. González wanted to attend the University of Salamanca with her friends, but her grandmother sent her to join two cousins at the University of Seville in Andalusia. She graduated with a degree in geography and history.

González was a candidate for the Democratic and Social Centre (CDS) while at university, and in 1995 she joined the Andalusian Party (PA). She ran in seventh place on their list in the 2003 Seville municipal election and was not elected, and in third place in the Seville constituency in the 2004 Andalusian regional election and was not elected, but later that year she took a place on the City Council of Seville due to the resignation of Rosa Ortega. In March 2005, Antonio Ortega García resigned from the Parliament of Andalusia and González succeeded him, becoming spokesperson of the PA's group in the legislature from November.

=== Leader of the Andalusian Party ===
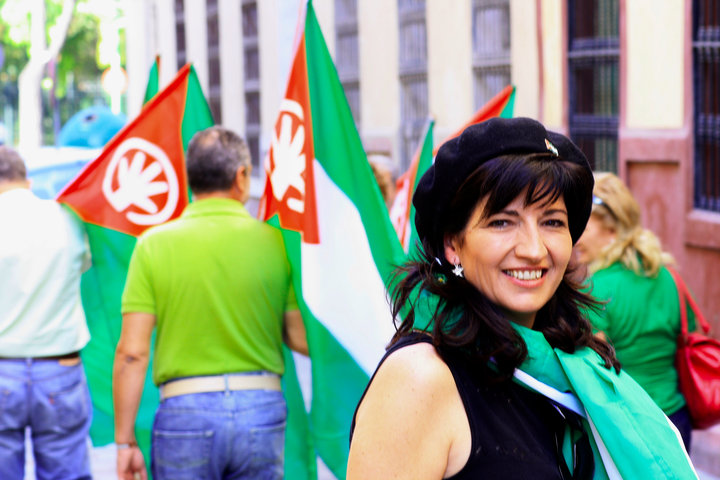
González in 2010

In June 2008, González was elected secretary general of the PA with 270 votes, ahead of Utrera mayor Francisco Jiménez on 201. She was the first woman to lead the party, which had lost all of its parliamentary seats and faced an €11 million debt.

González was the PA candidate for mayor in the 2011 Seville municipal election, and promised to finish the Seville Metro that had been proposed by her party's mayors Luis Uruñuela and Alejandro Rojas-Marcos. She also called for the end of provincial deputations, classing them as "Francoist relics". With 4.78% of the vote, her list took no seats.

González was proclaimed the PA candidate for President of the Regional Government of Andalusia in the 2012 Andalusian regional election. Having won no seats, she resigned.

=== Return to politics ===
In September 2012, González returned to politics, establishing Primavera Andaluza in Antequera. The self-declared "non-electoral" entity was established "to unite the Andalusian left in defence of the welfare state, Andalusian self-government and an escape from the [economic] crisis".

Logo of Primavera Andaluza

González told the Diario de Sevilla in February 2018 that "My time [as an elected representative] has already passed. My career in the gladiators' arena is over". In the 2019 Spanish local elections, she was a candidate for mayor of her residence of Dos Hermanas, a bastion of the Spanish Socialist Workers' Party (PSOE); by this time Primavera Andaluza had joined the original Adelante Andalucía movement. Her party won four seats, becoming the second largest group after the PSOE majority of mayor Francisco Toscano.

In November 2019, the AA group in the Parliament of Andalusia named González to the Senate of Spain. She resigned from Dos Hermanas City Council in January 2020. In September 2021, González spoke in the Senate in favour of official recognition of Andalusian Spanish as a separate language.

González was the lead candidate for the second Adelante Andalucía for the Cádiz constituency in the 2023 Spanish general election. Having failed to win a seat, she retired from politics.
