= 1995 Seville municipal election =

Election in the Spanish municipality of Seville

- 28 May 1995

All 33 seats in the City Council of Seville 17 seats needed for a majority
- Opinion polls
- Registered: 559,451 ▲9.2%
- Turnout: 354,331 (63.3%) ▲8.5 pp

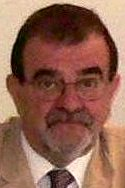

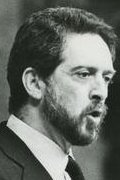

	First party	Second party	Third party
Leader	Soledad Becerril	José Rodríguez de la Borbolla	Alejandro Rojas-Marcos
Party	PP	PSOE–A	PA
Leader since	24 March 1987	29 December 1994	29 August 1986
Last election	8 seats, 24.4%	12 seats, 38.6%	9 seats, 27.6%
Seats won	10	10	9
Seat change	▲2	▼2	0
Popular vote	107,446	100,729	92,417
Percentage	30.4%	28.5%	26.2%
Swing	▲6.0 pp	▼10.1 pp	▼1.4 pp
	Fourth party
Leader	Luis Pizarro
Party	IULV–CA
Leader since	1995
Last election	2 seats, 6.9%
Seats won	4
Seat change	▲2
Popular vote	45,416
Percentage	12.9%
Swing	▲6.0 pp
Mayor before election
Alejandro Rojas-Marcos
PA
Mayor after election
Soledad Becerril
PP

A municipal election was held in Seville on 28 May 1995 to elect the 5th City Council of the municipality. All 33 seats in the City Council were up for election. It was held concurrently with regional elections in thirteen autonomous communities and local elections all across Spain.

== Overview ==
Under the 1978 Constitution, the governance of municipalities in Spain—part of the country's local government system—was centered on the figure of city councils (Spanish: ayuntamientos), local corporations with independent legal personality composed of a mayor, a government council and an elected legislative assembly. The mayor was indirectly elected by the local assembly, requiring an absolute majority; otherwise, the candidate from the most-voted party automatically became mayor (ties were resolved by drawing lots). In the case of Seville, the top-tier administrative and governing body was the City Council of Seville.

=== Date ===
The term of local assemblies in Spain expired four years after the date of their previous election, with election day being fixed for the fourth Sunday of May every four years. The election decree was required to be issued no later than 54 days before the scheduled election date and published on the following day in the Official State Gazette (BOE). The previous local elections were held on 26 May 1991, setting the date for election day on the fourth Sunday of May four years later, which was 28 May 1995.

Local assemblies could not be dissolved before the expiration of their term, except in cases of mismanagement that seriously harmed the public interest and implied a breach of constitutional obligations, in which case the Council of Ministers could—optionally—decide to call a by-election.

Elections to the assemblies of local entities were officially called on 4 April 1995 with the publication of the corresponding decree in the BOE, setting election day for 28 May.

=== Electoral system ===
Voting for local assemblies was based on universal suffrage, comprising all Spanish nationals over 18 years of age, registered and residing in the municipality and with full political rights (provided that they had not been deprived of the right to vote by a final sentence, nor were legally incapacitated), as well as resident non-nationals whose country of origin allowed reciprocal voting by virtue of a treaty or within the framework of Community Law.

Local councillors were elected using the D'Hondt method and closed-list proportional voting, with a five percent-threshold of valid votes (including blank ballots) in each municipality. Each municipality was a multi-member constituency, with a number of seats based on the following scale:

Population	Councillors
<250	5
251–1,000	7
1,001–2,000	9
2,001–5,000	11
5,001–10,000	13
10,001–20,000	17
20,001–50,000	21
50,001–100,000	25
>100,001	+1 per each 100,000 inhabitants or fraction +1 if total is an even number

The law did not provide for by-elections to fill vacant seats; instead, any vacancies arising after the proclamation of candidates and during the legislative term were filled by the next candidates on the party lists or, when required, by designated substitutes.

== Parties and candidates ==
The electoral law allowed for parties and federations registered in the interior ministry, alliances and groupings of electors to present lists of candidates. Parties and federations intending to form an alliance were required to inform the relevant electoral commission within 10 days of the election call, whereas groupings of electors needed to secure the signature of a determined amount of the electors registered in the municipality for which they sought election, disallowing electors from signing for more than one list. In the case of Seville, as its population was between 300,001 and 1,000,000, at least 5,000 signatures were required.

Below is a list of the main parties and alliances which contested the election:

Candidacy	Parties and alliances	Leading candidate	Ideology	Previous result		Gov.	Ref.
Candidacy	Parties and alliances	Leading candidate	Ideology	Vote %	Seats	Gov.	Ref.
PSOE–A	List: Spanish Socialist Workers' Party of Andalusia (PSOE–A)	José Rodríguez de la Borbolla	Social democracy	38.6%	12	No	
PA	List: Andalusian Party (PA)	Alejandro Rojas-Marcos	Andalusian nationalism Social democracy	27.6%	9	Yes	
PP	List: People's Party (PP)	Soledad Becerril	Conservatism; Christian democracy	24.4%	8	Yes	
IULV–CA	List: United Left/The Greens–Assembly for Andalusia (IULV–CA) – Communist Party of Andalusia (PCA) – Socialist Action Party (PASOC) – Republican Left (IR) – Collectives for the Unity of Workers (CUT)	Luis Pizarro	Socialism; Communism	6.9%	2	No	

== Opinion polls ==
The tables below list opinion polling results in reverse chronological order, showing the most recent first and using the dates when the survey fieldwork was done, as opposed to the date of publication. Where the fieldwork dates are unknown, the date of publication is given instead. The highest percentage figure in each polling survey is displayed with its background shaded in the leading party's colour. If a tie ensues, this is applied to the figures with the highest percentages. The "Lead" column on the right shows the percentage-point difference between the parties with the highest percentages in a poll.

=== Voting intention estimates ===
The table below lists weighted voting intention estimates. Refusals are generally excluded from the party vote percentages, while question wording and the treatment of "don't know" responses and those not intending to vote may vary between polling organisations. When available, seat projections determined by the polling organisations are displayed below (or in place of) the percentages in a smaller font; 17 seats were required for an absolute majority in the City Council of Seville (16 in the 1991 election).

Polling firm/Commissioner	Fieldwork date	Sample size	Turnout	PSOE–A	PA	PP	IULV	Lead
1995 municipal election	28 May 1995	—N/a	63.3	28.5; 10	26.2; 9	30.4; 10	12.9; 4	1.9
Demoscopia/El País	10–15 May 1995	1,000	?	29.0; 9/10	25.8; 7	30.0; 9/10	12.2; 5	1.0
CIS	1–14 May 1995	600	68.5	29.6	20.5	34.7	14.1	5.1
Sigma Dos/El Mundo	3–7 May 1995	500	?	27.4; 9/10	23.0; 7/8	32.6; 11	15.0; 5	5.2
PP	9 Apr 1995	?	?	29.0; 10/11	18.0; 8/9	34.0; 12	15.0; 6	5.0
Gruppo/ABC	9–14 Feb 1995	400	?	31.0; 10/11	17.5; 6	33.1; 11/12	15.7; 5	2.1
Inner Line/PSOE	15–28 Dec 1994	800	?	37.4; 13/14	? 7/8	28.7; 8/9	11.1; 3/4	8.7
1994 regional election	12 Jun 1994	—N/a	66.9	32.9 (11)	6.2 (2)	38.6 (13)	19.9 (7)	5.7
1994 EP election	12 Jun 1994	—N/a	66.8	36.7 (13)	4.1 (0)	38.8 (14)	16.9 (6)	2.1
1993 general election	6 Jun 1993	—N/a	77.5	49.1 (17)	3.4 (0)	32.8 (11)	11.2 (3)	16.3
1991 municipal election	26 May 1991	—N/a	54.8	38.6; 12	27.6; 9	24.4; 8	6.9; 2	11.0

=== Voting preferences ===
The table below lists raw, unweighted voting preferences.

Polling firm/Commissioner	Fieldwork date	Sample size	PSOE–A	PA	PP	IULV	Question	X mark	Lead
1995 municipal election	28 May 1995	—N/a	18.0	16.5	19.2	8.1	—N/a	36.7	1.2
CIS	1–14 May 1995	600	17.3	15.3	20.8	11.0	22.9	10.0	3.5
1994 regional election (Note: Does not include non-resident citizens.)	12 Jun 1994	—N/a	21.9	4.2	25.7	13.2	—N/a	33.1	3.8
1994 EP election	12 Jun 1994	—N/a	24.4	2.8	25.8	11.2	—N/a	33.2	1.4
1993 general election	6 Jun 1993	—N/a	37.8	2.6	25.3	8.7	—N/a	22.5	12.5
1991 municipal election	26 May 1991	—N/a	21.1	15.1	13.3	3.8	—N/a	45.2	6.0

=== Victory preferences ===
The table below lists opinion polling on the victory preferences for each party in the event of a municipal election taking place.

Polling firm/Commissioner	Fieldwork date	Sample size	PSOE–A	PA	PP	IULV	Other/ None	Question	Lead
CIS	1–14 May 1995	600	21.3	10.9	24.2	15.3	–	28.3	2.9

=== Victory likelihood ===
The table below lists opinion polling on the perceived likelihood of victory for each party in the event of a municipal election taking place.

Polling firm/Commissioner	Fieldwork date	Sample size	PSOE–A	PA	PP	IULV	Other/ None	Question	Lead
CIS	1–14 May 1995	600	21.0	9.1	34.2	1.5	–	34.2	13.2

=== Preferred Mayor ===
The table below lists opinion polling on leader preferences to become mayor of Seville.

Polling firm/Commissioner	Fieldwork date	Sample size					Other/ None/ Not care	Question	Lead
Polling firm/Commissioner	Fieldwork date	Sample size	Borbolla PSOE–A	R. Marcos PA	Becerril PP	Pizarro IULV	Other/ None/ Not care	Question	Lead
CIS	1–14 May 1995	600	20.3	33.5	18.8	–	9.9	17.5	13.2
CIS	18 Feb–2 Mar 1995	202	26.4	24.9	14.9	10.4	4.5	18.9	1.5

== Results ==
← Summary of the 28 May 1995 City Council of Seville election results →
Parties and alliances	Popular vote			Seats	
Parties and alliances	Votes	%	±pp	Total	+/−
People's Party (PP)	107,446	30.44	+6.09	10	+2
Spanish Socialist Workers' Party of Andalusia (PSOE–A)	100,729	28.54	−10.03	10	−2
Andalusian Party (PA)	92,417	26.19	−1.36	9	±0
United Left/The Greens–Assembly for Andalusia (IULV–CA)	45,416	12.87	+6.01	4	+2
Andalusian Progress Party (PAP)	710	0.20	New	0	±0
Voice of the Andalusian People (VDPA)	549	0.16	New	0	±0
Humanist Platform (PH)^{1}	247	0.07	−0.24	0	±0
Spanish Phalanx of the CNSO (FE–JONS)	236	0.07	−0.03	0	±0
Workers' Revolutionary Party (PRT)^{2}	212	0.06	−0.14	0	±0
Andalusian Popular Unity (UPAN)	146	0.04	−0.04	0	±0
Blank ballots	4,826	1.37	+0.58		
Total	352,934			33	+2
Valid votes	352,934	99.61	−0.07		
Invalid votes	1,397	0.39	+0.07		
Votes cast / turnout	354,331	63.34	+8.49		
Abstentions	205,120	36.66	−8.49		
Registered voters	559,451				
Sources
Footnotes: ^{1} Humanist Platform results are compared to The Greens Ecologist–Humanist List totals in the 1991 election.; ^{2} Workers' Revolutionary Party results are compared to Workers' Socialist Party totals in the 1991 election.

Popular vote
PP	30.44%
PSOE–A	28.54%
PA	26.19%
IULV–CA	12.87%
Others	0.60%
Blank ballots	1.37%

Seats
PP	30.30%
PSOE–A	30.30%
PA	27.27%
IULV–CA	12.12%

== Aftermath ==
=== Government formation ===
Investiture
Ballot →	17 June 1995	
Required majority →	17 out of 33	
Soledad Becerril (PP): • PP (10); • PA (9)	19 / 33	check
José Rodríguez de la Borbolla (PSOE–A): • PSOE–A (10)	10 / 33	X mark
Luis Pizarro (IULV–CA): • IULV–CA (4)	4 / 33	X mark
Abstentions/Blank ballots	0 / 33	
Absentees	0 / 33	

== Bibliography ==
- Constitución Española (Constitution). Official State Gazette (in Spanish). 27 December 1978 [version as of 28 August 1992]. BOE-A-1978-31229.
- Ley 7/1985, de 2 de abril, Reguladora de las Bases del Régimen Local (Law 7/1985). Official State Gazette (in Spanish). 2 April 1985 [version as of 31 December 1994]. BOE-A-1985-5392.
- Ley Orgánica 5/1985, de 19 de junio, del Régimen Electoral General (Organic Law 5/1985). Official State Gazette (in Spanish). 19 June 1985 [version as of 24 March 1995]. BOE-A-1985-11672.
- Real Decreto 489/1995, de 3 de abril, de convocatoria de elecciones locales y a las Asambleas de Ceuta y Melilla (Royal Decree 489/1995). Official State Gazette (in Spanish). 3 April 1995. BOE-A-1995-8132.
