= Manuel del Valle =

Spanish politician (1939–2020)

Mayor of Seville
- In office 24 May 1983 – 30 June 1991
- Preceded by: Luis Uruñuela
- Succeeded by: Alejandro Rojas-Marcos

President of the Provincial Council of Seville
- In office 1979–1983
- Preceded by: Mariano Borrero
- Succeeded by: Miguel Ángel Pino Menchén

Member of the Seville City Council
- In office 3 May 1979 – 17 June 1991

Senator of Spain for Seville
- In office 1979–1982

Personal details
- Born: 10 November 1939 Seville, Spain
- Died: 26 March 2020 (aged 80) Seville, Spain
- Party: PSOE
- Education: University of Seville
- Profession: Lawyer politician

Manuel del Valle Arévalo (10 November 1939 – 26 March 2020) was a Spanish lawyer, politician, and member of the Spanish Socialist Workers' Party (PSOE) who served as Mayor of Seville from 24 May 1983 until 30 June 1991. Del Valle is credited with redesigning and transforming Seville's modern urban infrastructure in preparation for the Seville Expo '92. His major achievements included the construction of the Seville-Santa Justa railway station and a new railway layout within the city, the SE-30 ring road and other new highways, and a series of new bridges, including the landmark Santiago Calatrava-designed Alamillo Bridge.

The Spanish newspaper, ABC, called Manuel del Valle's infrastructure developments "the greatest transformation of the city since the times of García de Vinuesa as mayor in the 19th century," when that mayor demolished portions of the Walls of Seville.

== Biography ==
Manuel del Valle was born in Seville on 10 November 1939. He earned his law degree from the University of Seville and became an attorney specializing in labor law.

Del Valle joined the fledgling Spanish Socialist Workers' Party (PSOE) during the early 1970s. He was close friends and associates of several prominent, future PSOE leaders during his early life and career, including Felipe González (the future PSOE Prime Minister of Spain), Alfonso Guerra, and Manuel Chaves. In 1974, Manuel del Valle and a group of young PSOE allies, including Felipe González, won the party's leadership elections, which were held in Suresnes, France, as the Franco dictatorship was still in power.

From 1979 until 1983, Manuel del Valle served as the first democratically elected President of the Provincial Council of Seville (Diputación Provincial de Sevilla), which governs the Province of Seville and its municipalities. He also served in the national Senate of Spain, representing Seville as a member of the PSOE, from 1979 to 1982.

=== Mayor of Seville ===
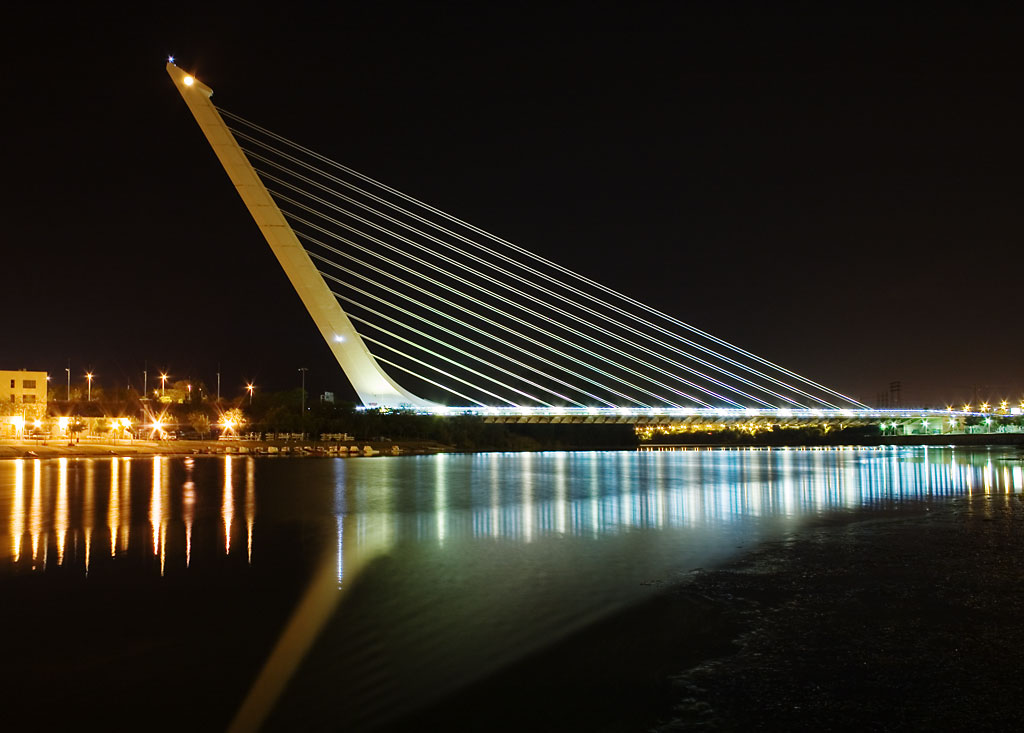
The Alamillo Bridge. Construction began in 1989 under Mayor del Valle. Completed in 1992.

Prime Minister Felipe González and the PSOE swept to power in the 1982 Spanish general election. However, despite the win, Manuel del Valle decided to leave the national Senate and focus on his political career in his home city of Seville. In 1983, Manuel del Valle led the PSOE candidates to an absolute majority on the Seville City Council. Del Valle and the PSOE ousted incumbent Seville Mayor Luis Uruñuela of the Andalusian Party. With a PSOE majority in city council, Manuel del Valle was sworn into his first term as mayor on 24 May 1983. He won re-election in June 1987 with a smaller PSOE simple majority in the city council.

During the 1980s, it was announced that Seville would host the forthcoming Seville Expo '92, to be held in 1992 to commemorate the 500th anniversary of Christopher Columbus reaching the Americas. To host such a large event, Seville needed to upgrade or construct an entirely new urban infrastructure. In response, Mayor del Valle launched the 1987 Plan General de Ordenación Urbana (General Urban Planning Plan), or PGOU, a type of urban plan, to modernize and re-draw the city's rail and road infrastructure. Del Valle's new plan replaced an older, outdated PGOU dating from 1964.

Del Valle's 1987 urban plan called for rebuilding of Seville's entire train and road systems. The city's railway system was expanded and completely re-built to add new lines and stations. Seville's new main train station, Seville-Santa Justa railway station, was planned and constructed under Mayor del Valle. Seville-Santa Justa opened in 1991, just before the 1992 launch of the Madrid–Seville high-speed rail line. Old train tracks were removed from the along the river and rerouted to Chapina, which opened the Guadalquivir riverfront to development.

The SE-30 ring road around central Seville, which was completed under Manuel del Valle.

Del Valle also built the new SE-30 ring road, first as a two-lane road before its expansion to three-lanes, around Seville to re-route traffic flow.

He also spearheaded a series of brand new bridges over the Guadalquivir during his administration. New major bridges opened under del Valle's PGOU plan included the Alamillo Bridge, the Puente de la Barqueta and the Centenario Bridge, which were built between 1989 and 1992. Other bridges added by Mayor del Valle include the Puente de las Delicias (opened in 1990) and the Pasarela de la Cartuja (opened in 1991).

Despite his achievements and successful transformation of Seville's urban landscape in preparation for the Seville Expo '92, Mayor del Valle's political party, the Spanish Socialist Workers' Party (PSOE), decided not to renominate him for re-election in the 1991 Seville City Council elections. His re-election as mayor was opposed and rejected at the behest of Alfonso Guerra, a major PSOE figure at the time. The loss of the renomination meant that Manuel del Valle, who had spent years redesigning Seville's urban landscape and infrastructure, would not open Seville Expo '92 as the city's sitting mayor, which was a major personal and professional disappointment.

Instead of renominating del Valle for another term as mayor, the PSOE chose Luis Yáñez to lead the PSOE ticket as del Valle's potential successor. However, the move backfired and Yáñez and the PSOE lost the 1991 municipal election, which was won by Alejandro Rojas-Marcos of the Andalusian Party (PA). Manuel del Valle left office on 30 June 1991, more than a year before the opening of the Seville Expo '92. As for the PSOE, the party did not regain the mayor's office until Alfredo Sánchez Monteseirín was elected in 1999.

Many of the urban planning projects begun by del Valle continued to open in the months after he left office in time for Seville Expo '92. In 1992, the new Madrid–Seville high-speed rail line, connecting Madrid to Seville's new Seville-Santa Justa railway station (opened in 1991) began operations. Seville's major new bridges, Alamillo Bridge and the Puente de la Barqueta, begun under Mayor del Valle in 1989, opened in 1992 in the run-up to the Expo.

=== Later life and career ===
Del Valle remained active in a variety of civic, historical, and urban affairs organizations after leaving office. He chaired the El Monte Foundation and served as a member of the board of trustees for the Alcázar of Seville, the city's royal palace. He also acted as co-president of the Civic Union of Southern Spain (Unión Cívica del Sur de España), or Civisur, an organization which seeks stronger business and political ties between Seville and Málaga. In September 2019, Seville Mayor Juan Espadas appointed Del Valle as the Mayor of the Alcázar, a position he held until his death in March 2020.

Manuel del Valle remained a loyal member of the PSOE, though he also became a critic of the party's leadership in recent years. In December 2019 interview, del Valle criticized Spanish Prime Minister Pedro Sánchez and other current PSOE leaders, saying "they are going to destroy the party, although, I believe that it is already destroyed."

Del Valle began chemotherapy for leukemia at the Virgen del Rocío Hospital in October 2019. He died from the disease at his Plaza Alfonso de Cossío home in the Huerta de la Salud neighborhood of Seville on 26 March 2020, at the age of 81.
