= 2003 Seville municipal election =

Election in the Spanish municipality of Seville

- 25 May 2003

All 33 seats in the City Council of Seville 17 seats needed for a majority
- Opinion polls
- Registered: 581,939 ▼0.7%
- Turnout: 340,726 (58.6%) ▲2.1 pp
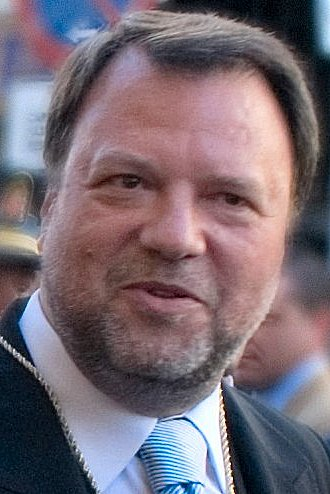

	First party	Second party	Third party
Leader	Alfredo Sánchez Monteseirín	Jaime Raynaud	José Núñez
Party	PSOE–A	PP	PA
Leader since	27 June 1998	18 July 2002	4 April 2002
Last election	12 seats, 35.4% (Note: Results for PSOE–A (35.2%, 12 seats) and PDNI–A (0.2%, 0 seats) in the 1999 election.)	13 seats, 35.8%	6 seats, 17.6%
Seats won	14	12	4
Seat change	▲2	▼1	▼2
Popular vote	130,958	119,395	41,805
Percentage	38.6%	35.2%	12.3%
Swing	▲3.2 pp	▼0.6 pp	▼5.3 pp
	Fourth party
Leader	Paula Garvín
Party	IULV–CA
Leader since	23 November 2002
Last election	2 seats, 7.8%
Seats won	3
Seat change	▲1
Popular vote	30,443
Percentage	9.0%
Swing	▲1.2 pp
Mayor before election
Alfredo Sánchez Monteseirín
PSOE
Mayor after election
Alfredo Sánchez Monteseirín
PSOE

A municipal election was held in Seville on 25 May 2003 to elect the 7th City Council of the municipality. All 33 seats in the City Council were up for election. It was held concurrently with regional elections in thirteen autonomous communities and local elections all across Spain.

== Overview ==
Under the 1978 Constitution, the governance of municipalities in Spain—part of the country's local government system—was centered on the figure of city councils (Spanish: ayuntamientos), local corporations with independent legal personality composed of a mayor, a government council and an elected legislative assembly. The mayor was indirectly elected by the local assembly, requiring an absolute majority; otherwise, the candidate from the most-voted party automatically became mayor (ties were resolved by drawing lots). In the case of Seville, the top-tier administrative and governing body was the City Council of Seville.

=== Date ===
The term of local assemblies in Spain expired four years after the date of their previous election, with election day being fixed for the fourth Sunday of May every four years. The election decree was required to be issued no later than 54 days before the scheduled election date and published on the following day in the Official State Gazette (BOE). The previous local elections were held on 13 June 1999, setting the date for election day on the fourth Sunday of May four years later, which was 25 May 2003.

Local assemblies could not be dissolved before the expiration of their term, except in cases of mismanagement that seriously harmed the public interest and implied a breach of constitutional obligations, in which case the Council of Ministers could—optionally—decide to call a by-election.

Elections to the assemblies of local entities were officially called on 1 April 2003 with the publication of the corresponding decree in the BOE, setting election day for 25 May.

=== Electoral system ===
Voting for local assemblies was based on universal suffrage, comprising all Spanish nationals over 18 years of age, registered and residing in the municipality and with full political rights (provided that they had not been deprived of the right to vote by a final sentence, nor were legally incapacitated), as well as resident non-national European citizens, and those whose country of origin allowed reciprocal voting by virtue of a treaty.

Local councillors were elected using the D'Hondt method and closed-list proportional voting, with a five percent-threshold of valid votes (including blank ballots) in each municipality. Each municipality was a multi-member constituency, with a number of seats based on the following scale:

Population	Councillors
<250	5
251–1,000	7
1,001–2,000	9
2,001–5,000	11
5,001–10,000	13
10,001–20,000	17
20,001–50,000	21
50,001–100,000	25
>100,001	+1 per each 100,000 inhabitants or fraction +1 if total is an even number

The law did not provide for by-elections to fill vacant seats; instead, any vacancies arising after the proclamation of candidates and during the legislative term were filled by the next candidates on the party lists or, when required, by designated substitutes.

== Parties and candidates ==
The electoral law allowed for parties and federations registered in the interior ministry, alliances and groupings of electors to present lists of candidates. Parties and federations intending to form an alliance were required to inform the relevant electoral commission within 10 days of the election call, whereas groupings of electors needed to secure the signature of a determined amount of the electors registered in the municipality for which they sought election, disallowing electors from signing for more than one list. In the case of Seville, as its population was between 300,001 and 1,000,000, at least 5,000 signatures were required.

Below is a list of the main parties and alliances which contested the election:

Candidacy	Parties and alliances	Leading candidate	Ideology	Previous result		Gov.	Ref.
Candidacy	Parties and alliances	Leading candidate	Ideology	Vote %	Seats	Gov.	Ref.
PP	List: People's Party (PP)	Jaime Raynaud	Conservatism; Christian democracy	35.8%	13	No	
PSOE–A	List: Spanish Socialist Workers' Party of Andalusia (PSOE–A)	Alfredo Sánchez Monteseirín	Social democracy	35.4%	12	Yes	
PA	List: Andalusian Party (PA)	José Núñez	Andalusian nationalism Social democracy	17.6%	6	Yes	
IULV–CA	List: United Left/The Greens–Assembly for Andalusia (IULV–CA) – Communist Party of Andalusia (PCA) – Collective for the Unity of Workers–Andalusian Left Bloc (CUT–BAI) – Revolutionary Workers' Party (POR) – Workers' Revolutionary Party–Revolutionary Left (PRT–IR)	Paula Garvín	Socialism; Communism	7.8%	2	No	

== Opinion polls ==
The tables below list opinion polling results in reverse chronological order, showing the most recent first and using the dates when the survey fieldwork was done, as opposed to the date of publication. Where the fieldwork dates are unknown, the date of publication is given instead. The highest percentage figure in each polling survey is displayed with its background shaded in the leading party's colour. If a tie ensues, this is applied to the figures with the highest percentages. The "Lead" column on the right shows the percentage-point difference between the parties with the highest percentages in a poll.

=== Voting intention estimates ===
The table below lists weighted voting intention estimates. Refusals are generally excluded from the party vote percentages, while question wording and the treatment of "don't know" responses and those not intending to vote may vary between polling organisations. When available, seat projections determined by the polling organisations are displayed below (or in place of) the percentages in a smaller font; 17 seats were required for an absolute majority in the City Council of Seville.

Color key:

Exit poll

Polling firm/Commissioner	Fieldwork date	Sample size	Turnout	PP	PSOE–A	PA	IULV	Lead
2003 municipal election	25 May 2003	—N/a	58.6	35.2; 12	38.6; 14	12.3; 4	9.0; 3	3.4
Sigma Dos/Antena 3	25 May 2003	?	?	? 12	? 13	? 5	? 3	?
Ipsos–Eco/RTVE	25 May 2003	?	?	? 11/12	? 14/15	–	–	?
Demoscopia/Tele 5	25 May 2003	?	?	? 12	? 13	? 5	? 3	?
Opina/El País	18 May 2003	?	?	35.0; 12	38.0; 14	14.0; 5	7.0; 2	3.0
Sigma Dos/El Mundo (Note: "Una alianza PP-PSOE podría gobernar las tres capitales de provincia del País Vasco". El Mundo (in Spanish). 17 May 2003. (subscription required))	8–13 May 2003	400	?	31.4; 11	41.3; 14/15	16.4; 5/6	7.5; 2	9.9
Vox Pública/El Periódico	9 May 2003	?	?	32.0– 33.0; 11/12	35.5– 36.5; 12/13	18.5– 19.5; 6/7	7.0– 8.0; 2	3.5
Ipsos–Eco/ABC	28 Apr 2003	?	?	30.4; 10/11	33.2; 11/12	23.5; 8	9.3; 2/3	2.8
CIS	22 Mar–28 Apr 2003	549	60.4	31.4; 11	41.7; 14	14.8; 5	8.9; 3	10.3
Opina/CES	8–9 Apr 2003	800	55–60	32.0; 11	39.0; 13/14	? 5/6	? 3	7.0
Idea Consultores/PP	20–23 Jan 2003	800	?	? 13/14	? 11/12	? 6	? 3	?
PSOE	9–15 Dec 2002	813	?	34.0– 36.0; 11/12	44.0– 46.0; 15	13.0– 14.0; 4/5	6.0– 7.0; 2	10.0
Ipsos–Eco/ABC	3–5 Dec 2002	502	?	32.9; 11/12	35.7; 12/13	19.5; 7	6.8; 2	2.8
Demoscopia/PP	6 Jun 2002	?	?	? 14/15	? 12/13	? 3/4	? 2	?
Opina/CES	27–29 May 2002	800	?	38.4; 13	38.7; 14	13.4; 4	7.5; 2	0.3
Inner Line/PSOE	30 Apr–5 May 2002	800	?	35.0	40.0	14.0	8.0	5.0
Metra Seis/PA	13–20 Mar 2001	600	?	? 12	? 12	? 7	? 2	Tie
2000 regional election	12 Mar 2000	—N/a	68.4	39.0 (13)	43.3 (15)	7.3 (2)	7.5 (3)	4.3
2000 general election	12 Mar 2000	—N/a	68.4	41.5 (15)	43.2 (15)	4.8 (0)	7.1 (3)	1.7
1999 municipal election	13 Jun 1999	—N/a	56.5	35.8; 13	35.2; 12	17.6; 6	7.8; 2	0.6

=== Voting preferences ===
The table below lists raw, unweighted voting preferences.

Polling firm/Commissioner	Fieldwork date	Sample size	PP	PSOE–A	PA	IULV	Question	X mark	Lead
2003 municipal election	25 May 2003	—N/a	20.5	22.5	7.2	5.2	—N/a	41.4	2.0
CIS	22 Mar–28 Apr 2003	549	12.8	28.8	3.1	3.5	41.9	7.1	16.0
Idea Consultores/PP	20–23 Jan 2003	800	26.2	20.2	5.8	4.9	27.0	–	6.0
Opina/CES	27–29 May 2002	800	19.8	24.9	5.4	3.9	33.9	–	5.1
2000 regional election (Note: Does not include non-resident citizens.)	12 Mar 2000	—N/a	26.5	29.5	4.9	5.1	—N/a	31.6	3.0
2000 general election	12 Mar 2000	—N/a	28.3	29.4	3.3	4.9	—N/a	31.6	1.1
1999 municipal election	13 Jun 1999	—N/a	20.1	19.8	9.9	4.4	—N/a	43.5	0.3

=== Victory preferences ===
The table below lists opinion polling on the victory preferences for each party in the event of a municipal election taking place.

Polling firm/Commissioner	Fieldwork date	Sample size	PP	PSOE–A	PA	IULV	Other/ None	Question	Lead
CIS	22 Mar–28 Apr 2003	549	16.2	35.3	4.7	4.9	1.5	37.3	19.1
Opina/CES	8–9 Apr 2003	800	19.4	34.0	7.5	–	39.1		14.6
Opina/CES	27–29 May 2002	800	22.4	27.6	–	–	50.0		5.2

=== Victory likelihood ===
The table below lists opinion polling on the perceived likelihood of victory for each party in the event of a municipal election taking place.

Polling firm/Commissioner	Fieldwork date	Sample size	PP	PSOE–A	PA	IULV	Other/ None	Question	Lead
CIS	22 Mar–28 Apr 2003	549	6.7	55.6	1.6	0.4	0.2	35.5	48.9
Opina/CES	8–9 Apr 2003	800	5.0	67.8	2.4	–	2.5	22.3	62.8

== Results ==
← Summary of the 25 May 2003 City Council of Seville election results →
Parties and alliances	Popular vote			Seats	
Parties and alliances	Votes	%	±pp	Total	+/−
Spanish Socialist Workers' Party of Andalusia (PSOE–A)^{1}	130,958	38.60	+3.21	14	+2
People's Party (PP)	119,395	35.20	−0.65	12	−1
Andalusian Party (PA)	41,805	12.32	−5.32	4	−2
United Left/The Greens–Assembly for Andalusia (IULV–CA)	30,443	8.97	+1.20	3	+1
The Greens of Andalusia (LVA)^{2}	4,535	1.34	+0.55	0	±0
Socialist Party of Andalusia–Andalusian Left (PSA–IA)	1,823	0.54	New	0	±0
Group of Independent Citizens (GCI)	1,056	0.31	New	0	±0
Independent Spanish Phalanx–Phalanx 2000 (FEI–FE 2000)	309	0.09	+0.05	0	±0
Humanist Party (PH)	296	0.09	+0.03	0	±0
Democratic and Social Centre (CDS)	217	0.06	−0.01	0	±0
Blank ballots	8,395	2.47	+0.29		
Total	339,232			33	±0
Valid votes	339,232	99.56	+0.07		
Invalid votes	1,494	0.44	−0.07		
Votes cast / turnout	340,726	58.55	+2.06		
Abstentions	241,213	41.45	−2.06		
Registered voters	581,939				
Sources
Footnotes: ^{1} Spanish Socialist Workers' Party of Andalusia results are compared to the combined totals of Spanish Socialist Workers' Party of Andalusia and Democratic Party of the New Left–Andalusia in the 1999 election.; ^{2} The Greens of Andalusia results are compared to The Greens–Andalusian Left totals in the 1999 election.

Popular vote
PSOE–A	38.60%
PP	35.20%
PA	12.32%
IULV–CA	8.97%
LVA	1.34%
Others	1.09%
Blank ballots	2.47%

Seats
PSOE–A	42.42%
PP	36.36%
PA	12.12%
IULV–CA	9.09%

== Aftermath ==
=== Government formation ===
Investiture
Ballot →	14 June 2003	
Required majority →	17 out of 33	
Alfredo Sánchez Monteseirín (PSOE–A): • PSOE–A (14); • IULV–CA (3)	17 / 33	check
Jaime Raynaud (PP): • PP (12)	12 / 33	X mark
Paola Vivancos (PA): • PA (4)	4 / 33	X mark
Abstentions/Blank ballots	0 / 33	
Absentees	0 / 33	

== Bibliography ==
- Constitución Española (Constitution). Official State Gazette (in Spanish). 27 December 1978 [version as of 28 August 1992]. BOE-A-1978-31229.
- Ley 7/1985, de 2 de abril, Reguladora de las Bases del Régimen Local (Law 7/1985). Official State Gazette (in Spanish). 2 April 1985 [version as of 11 March 2003]. BOE-A-1985-5392.
- Ley Orgánica 5/1985, de 19 de junio, del Régimen Electoral General (Organic Law 5/1985). Official State Gazette (in Spanish). 19 June 1985 [version as of 11 March 2003]. BOE-A-1985-11672.
- Real Decreto 374/2003, de 31 de marzo, por el que se convocan elecciones locales y a las Asambleas de Ceuta y Melilla (Royal Decree 374/2003). Official State Gazette (in Spanish). 31 March 2003. BOE-A-2003-6489.
