= Socialist Alliance of Andalusia =

Socialist Alliance of Andalusia Alianza Socialista de Andalucía
- Leader: Alejandro Rojas-Marcos
- Founded: 1965 (as the Compromiso Político de Andalucía group); 1971 (as ASA proper)
- Dissolved: 1976
- Succeeded by: Socialist Party of Andalusia
- Headquarters: Seville
- Ideology: Socialism; Andalusian nationalism Antifascism
- Political position: Left-wing

Party flag

Socialist Alliance of Andalusia (Spanish: Alianza Socialista de Andalucía, ASA) was a clandestine left-wing Andalusian nationalist political organization from Andalusia (Spain), active during the last years of Francoism.

== History ==
ASA emerged in 1971 at a meeting in Mairena del Alcor in which Alejandro Rojas-Marcos, Luis Uruñuela, Guillermo Jiménez Sánchez, Diego de los Santos, Juan Carlos Aguilar, Ángel Tarancón, Rafael Illescas and Fermín Rodríguez Sañudo, all members of the Compromiso Político de Andalucía group (created in 1965) were present. ASA was the first Andalusian nationalist organization that emerged after the murder of Blas Infante in 1936.

In June 1976, ASA held the "1st Andalusian Congress" at the University of Málaga, which marked the official exit from clandestinity and a reorganization of the nationalist movement, which became the Socialist Party of Andalusia (PSA). One of the most notorious actions of the ASA was the edition of the manifesto "Por un Poder Andaluz" (For an Andalusian power) in 1976, in which it is claimed that Andalusia "must be legally configured through a Statute of Autonomy" as "the only possible way to end political dependence and economic and social exploitation."

== See also ==
- Andalucista Party
- Andalusian nationalism
