= Andalucista Youth =

Youth organisation in Andalucía

Andalucista Youth Juventudes Andalucistas
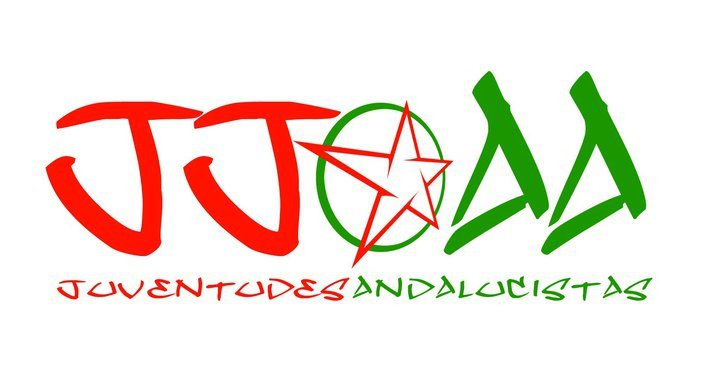
- Secretary General: Francisco Benítez
- Founded: 1983
- Headquarters: C/ Rastro Nº 8, Seville, Spain
- Ideology: Andalusian nationalism Left-wing nationalism Republicanism
- Mother party: Andalucía por Sí (since 2020); Andalucista Party (1983–2015)
- European affiliation: European Free Alliance Youth
- Website: juventudesandalucistas.org

Flag

Andalucista Youth (Spanish: Juventudes Andalucistas, abbreviated JJ.AA.) is a youth organization in Andalusia, Spain. They were the youth wing of the Andalusian Party from 1983 to 2015, when the latter disbanded. Since 2020 they are the youth wing of Andalucía por Sí.

As of 2012 David Gómez has been the national secretary of JJ.AA. JJ.AA. is a member of the Youth Council of Andalusia. As of 1999, JJ.AA. claimed a membership of 9,864.

JJ.AA. sticker, urging people to buy Andalusian products.

JJ.AA. held its third congress in Torremolinos in March 1988. At the congress the organization adopted a resolution calling for the right of self-determination for Andalusia. The congress elected Julián Álvarez, a law student, as its new general secretary. Álvarez later became the general secretary of the mother party.

As of 2007, Miguel Ángel Jiménez has served as the general secretary of JJ.AA. After Jiménez's mandate, a Collegiate Organ manages the organisation.

As of December 2013, after the XIII National Congress held in Coria del Río, Francisco Benítez de la Lama was elected as secretary general.

After mother party's Partido Andalucista dissolution in 2015, Juventudes Andalucistas kept their political activity focusing in the Andalusian youth. In 2020 they became the youth wing of the newly established Andalucía por Sí party.
