= Alfredo Sánchez Monteseirín =

Spanish politician (1957–2026)

- Sánchez Monteseirín in 2007

Mayor of Seville
- In office 4 July 1999 – 11 July 2011
- Preceded by: Soledad Becerril
- Succeeded by: Juan Ignacio Zoido

Personal details
- Born: 25 September 1957 La Rinconada, Spain
- Died: 26 October 2026 (aged 69)
- Party: Spanish Socialist Workers' Party
- Spouse: Felisa Tomás
- Education: University of Seville

Alfredo Sánchez Monteseirín (25 September 1957 – 26 October 2026) was a Spanish politician who served as Mayor of Seville from 1999 to 2011. A member of the Spanish Socialist Workers' Party, he served on the Burguillos council from 1979 to 1987, and in the Provincial Council of Seville. During his mayoralty he oversaw several urban projects, including the Metropol Parasol, Sevilla Tower, and MetroCentro tram system.

== Early life and education ==
Alfredo Sánchez Monteseirín was born in La Rinconada, Andalusia, Spain, on 25 September 1957, to Juan Luis Sánchez Centeno. His grandparents were originally from Seville, but moved to La Rinconada to work as teachers. His parents, who also worked as teachers, moved back to Seville when he was six. He studied at the Piarist school in Santa Catalina, where his father was a teacher.

Sánchez graduated from the University of Seville with a medical degree in 1981. He received a diploma in hospital management from the Barcelona School of Advanced Management and Administration. He practised medicine at the San Lázaro Hospital.

== Career ==
=== Politics ===
From 1979 to 1987, Sánchez was a member of the Burguillos council. He was president of the Andalusian Federation of Municipalities and Provinces. Sánchez became a member of the Provincial Council of Seville in 1983, and served as its president from 1995 to 1999.

Sánchez defeated José Rodríguez de la Borbolla for the Spanish Socialist Workers' Party's (PSOE) nomination as mayor of Seville in 1998. From 1999 to 2011, Sánchez served as mayor and formed a coalition government with the Andalusian Party in his first term and United Left in his second and third terms. He was the youngest person to serve as mayor at that point and was the longest-serving mayor of Seville since the 19th century. During his tenure he promoted the construction of the MetroCentro tram system and bike lanes and pedestrianization of the city. The Metropol Parasol and Sevilla Tower were constructed during his mayoralty; an area next to the Tower was named in his honour in 2021. The Alameda de Hércules and Port of Seville was redeveloped and renovated and 15,000 subsidized housing units were constructed.

Alberto Linero and Alberto Sanchez, both privates in the Spanish Air Force, married on 15 September 2006; it was the first same-sex marriage by members of the Spanish military after same-sex marriage was legalised in 2005. Sánchez officiated the marriage.

=== Civil service and appointments ===
Sánchez worked as a civil servant in the National Institute of Social Security and was Medical Inspector in the General Sub-Directorate of Health Services Inspection of the Regional Government of Andalusia. In 2016, he was appointed as deputy director of the Health Services Inspection within the Ministry of Health.

The Ministry of Finance selected Sánchez to replace Javier Landa as special state delegate to the Free Trade Zone of Seville in 2018, and he served until 2024. The PSOE appointed him director of the Pablo Iglesias Posse Foundation in 2020.

=== Academics ===
Sánchez was a professor at the University School of Social Work from 1987 to 1990. He moved to Madrid after his mayoralty and became a researcher at the Carlos III Health Institute and a professor at the National University of Distance Education.

== Personal life ==
Sánchez married Felisa Tomás. He suffered a stroke in 2023, and left his position as special state delegate. The Gold Medal of Seville was awarded to him in 2026, but he was unable to collect it and his wife accepted it on his behalf. He died on 26 October 2026.

== Works cited ==
=== News ===
- "Sánchez Monteseirín, el alcalde más longevo de Sevilla, recibirá la Medalla de la Ciudad" [Sánchez Monteseirín, Seville's longest-serving mayor, will receive the City Medal]. elDiario.es (in Spanish). 6 March 2025. Archived from the original on 28 October 2026.
- Martos, E. (21 June 2018). "Alfredo Sánchez Monteseirín será el nuevo delegado de la Zona Franca de Sevilla" [Alfredo Sánchez Monteseirín will be the new delegate of the Seville Free Trade Zone]. ABC (in Spanish). Archived from the original on 28 October 2026.
- Morente, Antonio (21 July 2024). "Sánchez Monteseirín, 25 años del alcalde que se atrevió a hacer cosas en Sevilla" [Sánchez Monteseirín, 25 years of the mayor who dared to do things in Seville]. elDiario.es (in Spanish). Archived from the original on 28 October 2026.
- Sánchez, Pedro (26 October 2026). "Muere el exalcalde de Sevilla Alfredo Sánchez Monteseirín, a los 69 años" [Former mayor of Seville Alfredo Sánchez Monteseirín dies at age 69]. The Objective (in Spanish). Archived from the original on 28 October 2026.
- Saiz, Eva (26 October 2026). "Muere Alfredo Sánchez Monteseirín, el alcalde que modernizó Sevilla, a los 69 años" [Alfredo Sánchez Monteseirín, the mayor who modernized Seville, dies at age 69]. El País (in Spanish). Archived from the original on 29 October 2026.
- Woolls, Daniel (15 September 2006). "2 Male Spanish Air Force Privates Wed". NBC News. Archived from the original on 29 October 2026.

=== Web ===
- "Alfredo Sánchez Monteseirín". Sevilla Es Fútbol. 5 April 2022. Archived from the original on 28 October 2026.
- "Alfredo Sánchez Monteseirín". Nueva Economia Forum. Archived from the original on 29 October 2026.
