= Luis Uruñuela =

Spanish politician (1937–2026)

Mayor of Seville
- In office 21 April 1979 – 23 May 1983
- Preceded by: José Ramón Pérez de Lama
- Succeeded by: Manuel del Valle

Personal details
- Born: 2 April 1937 Seville, Spain
- Died: 31 July 2026 (aged 89)
- Party: Andalusian Party

Luis Uruñuela Fernández (2 April 1937 – 31 July 2026) was a Spanish politician of the Andalusian Party (PA). He was the first democratically elected mayor of Seville, serving from 1979 to 1983.

== Career ==
Uruñuela was born on 2 April 1937, in Seville. He grew up on Calle Recaredo, in a family that supported Andalusian regionalism. He was elected to the Congress of Deputies in 1979, serving for two months before leaving to be the first democratically elected mayor of his city. He took the office due to a regional pact between his Andalusian Party, the Spanish Socialist Workers' Party (PSOE) and the Communist Party of Spain (PCE), in which the eight provincial capitals of Andalusia were divided between them.

Uruñuela defended the new powers given to city councils in the Spanish transition to democracy, and stopped the demolition of buildings and widening of streets that had been undertaken by the national government of Francoist Spain. He was a proponent of the Seville Metro, which saw much construction during his mandate. From 1983, his successor Manuel del Valle and the President of the Junta of Andalusia José Rodríguez de la Borbolla – both of the PSOE – halted the project. Under his government, the Sevilla Este neighbourhood near Seville Airport was developed, become the most populous of the city by the time of his death. In 1982, he handed the keys to the city to Pope John Paul II. From 1982 to 1990, he sat in the Parliament of Andalusia.

In May 2009, Uruñuela, Del Valle and Soledad Becerril received Seville's medal for being the first three democratic mayors of the city. He used his speech to reiterate his support for expanding the Metro into the Casco Antiguo. An avenue in Sevilla Este was named after him, as was a planned station on line 2 of the Metro.

== Personal life and death ==
For 75 years, Uruñuela was a member of the Fraternity of Los Negritos. He was baptised in their chapel due to the damage to his local parish church in the Spanish Civil War, and he and his family took part in their Holy Week processions.

Uruñuela had four daughters and a son. His first daughter, María José, died suddenly at the age of 46 in January 2012. He died on 31 July 2026, at the age of 89. The city council declared two days of mourning, and mayor José Luis Sanz remembered him as a "key driver of the growth of Seville".
