= City Council of Seville =

Local government body in Seville, Spain

- Ayuntamiento de Sevilla

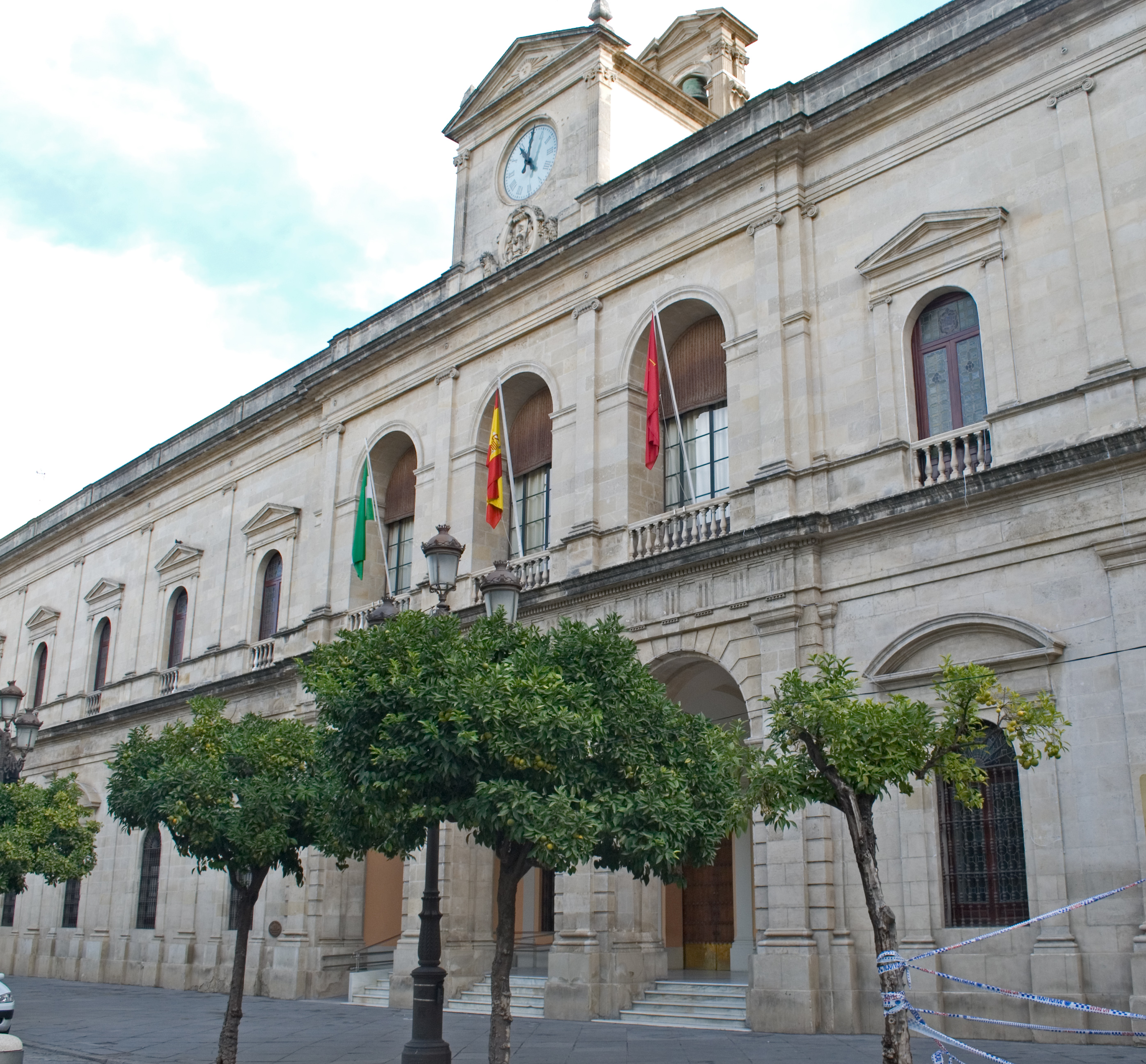
- Type: ayuntamiento
- Headquarters: Casa consistorial, Plaza Nueva 1, Seville, Spain
- Region served: Seville
- Mayor: José Luis Sanz (since 2023)
- Website: www.sevilla.org

The City Council of Seville (Spanish: Ayuntamiento de Sevilla) is the top-tier administrative and governing body (ayuntamiento) of the municipality of Seville, Spain. In terms of political structure, it consists of the invested Mayor of Seville, currently Juan Espadas, the Local Executive Board (Junta de Gobierno Local), the deputy mayors, and an elected 31-member deliberative Plenary (Pleno) with scrutiny powers. Each district in the municipality has its corresponding executive board (junta municipal de distrito).

== Elections ==
A list of local elections (electing the councillors of the Plenary) since the restoration of the democratic system is presented as follows:

- Seville City Council election, 1979 (31 councillors)
- Seville City Council election, 1983 (31 councillors)
- Seville City Council election, 1987 (31 councillors)
- Seville City Council election, 1991 (31 councillors)
- Seville City Council election, 1995 (33 councillors)
- Seville City Council election, 1999 (33 councillors)
- Seville City Council election, 2003 (33 councillors)
- Seville City Council election, 2007 (33 councillors)
- Seville City Council election, 2011 (33 councillors)
- Seville City Council election, 2015 (31 councillors)
- Seville City Council election, 2019 (31 councillors)
- Seville City Council election, 2023 (31 councillors)

== Mayors ==
The Mayor is elected by the members of the plenary among its members the day the new municipal corporation is formed after the local election, and has a mandate for the 4-year duration of the elected body. If the Mayor leaves office ahead of time a new voting may take place among the plenary members in order to invest a new mayor (meanwhile, another local councillor, conventionally the first deputy mayor, may act as acting Mayor). The current mayor, elected on 28 May 2023, is José Luis Sanz of the PP.

== City hall ==
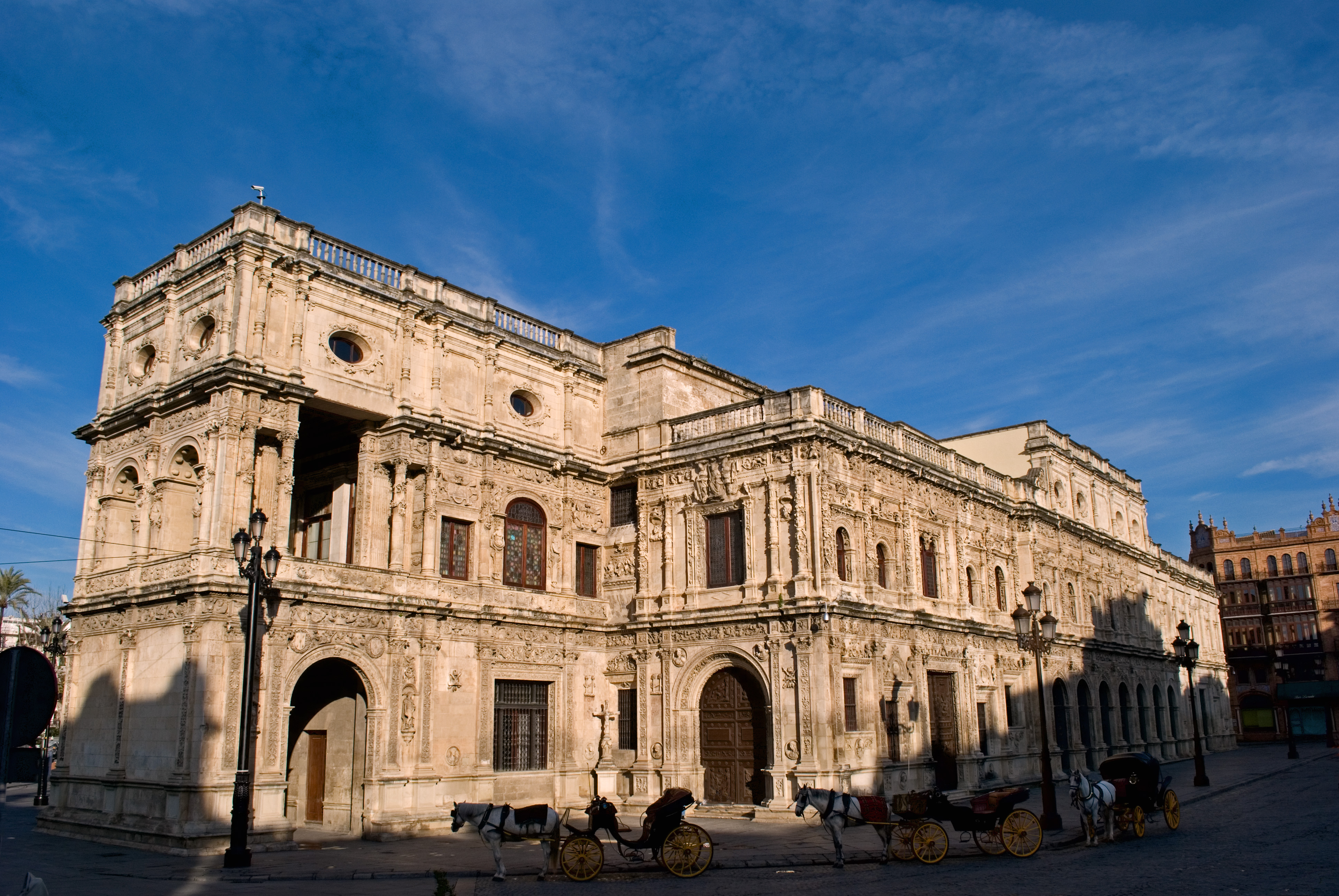
City hall

The city hall is located at the Plaza Nueva, 1, in the city centre. The building, whose construction started in 1521, features a distinctive plateresque style.

== See also ==
- Local government in Spain
