= Burguillos =

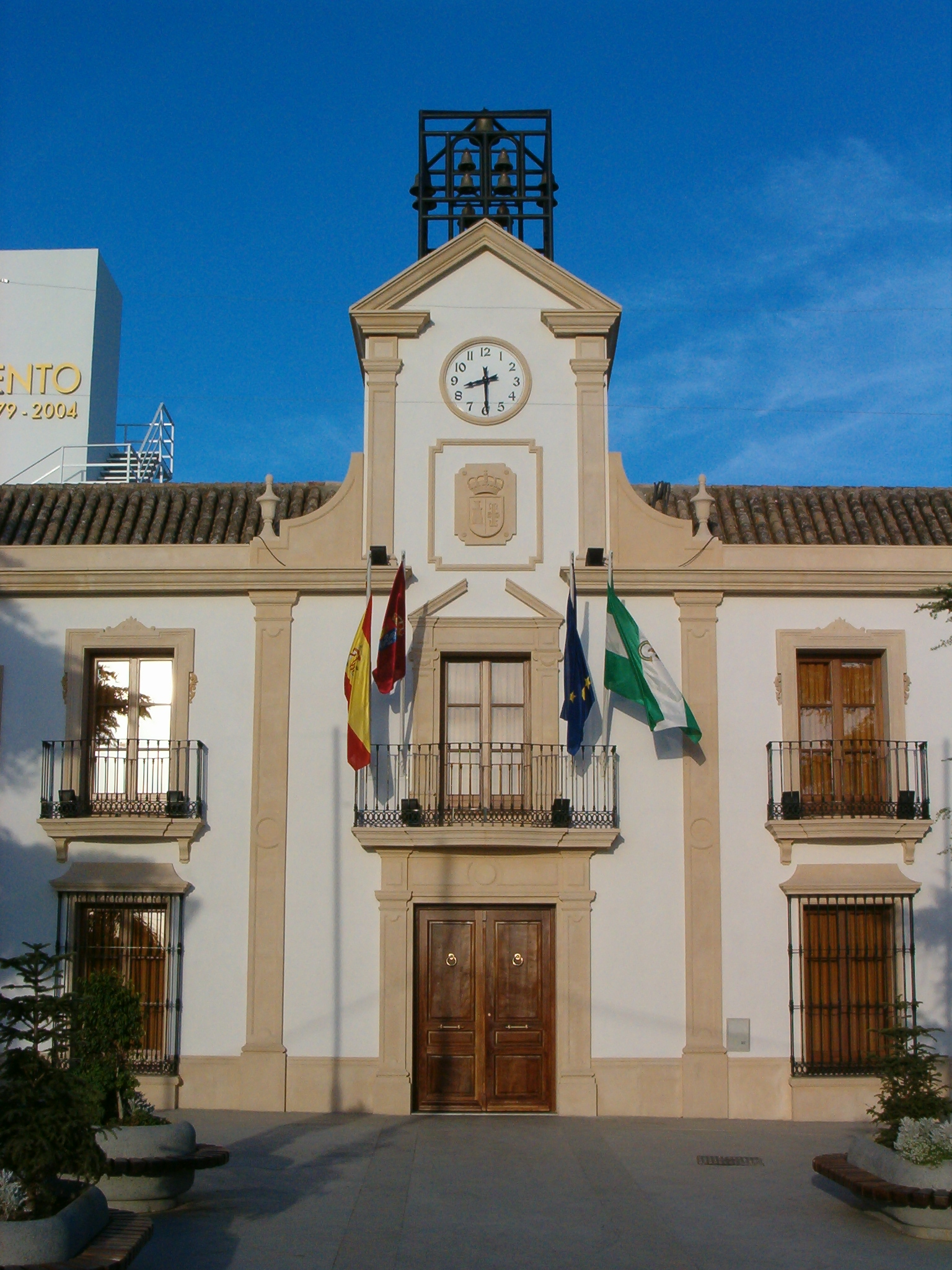
- Municipal hall

- Flag Coat of arms

- Location in Spain.
- Coordinates: 37.585°N 5.967°W
- Country: Spain
- Autonomous community: Andalusia

Area
  - Total: 43.14 km^{2} (16.66 sq mi)
- Elevation: 80 m (260 ft)

Population (2023)
  - Total: 7,098
  - Density: 164.5/km^{2} (426.1/sq mi)
- Time zone: UTC+1 (CET)
  - Summer (DST): UTC+2 (CEST)
- Website: burguillos.es

Burguillos is a municipality in the province of Seville, in the region of Andalusia, southern Spain. In 2023, it had 7,098 inhabitants. The town of Burguillos lies at an elevation of 80 meters on the plain of the Guadalquivir river, 23 kilometres (14 mi) north of the provincial capital, Seville. The foothills of the Sierra Morena rise to the north of the town. The A-460 and A-8013 roads pass through the municipality and meet at a roundabout in the town. Two industrial estates named the Estanquillo and the Cuarto de la Huerta have been constructed off the A-460.

== See also ==
- List of municipalities in Seville
