= Luis Yáñez-Barnuevo =

Spanish politician (born 1943)

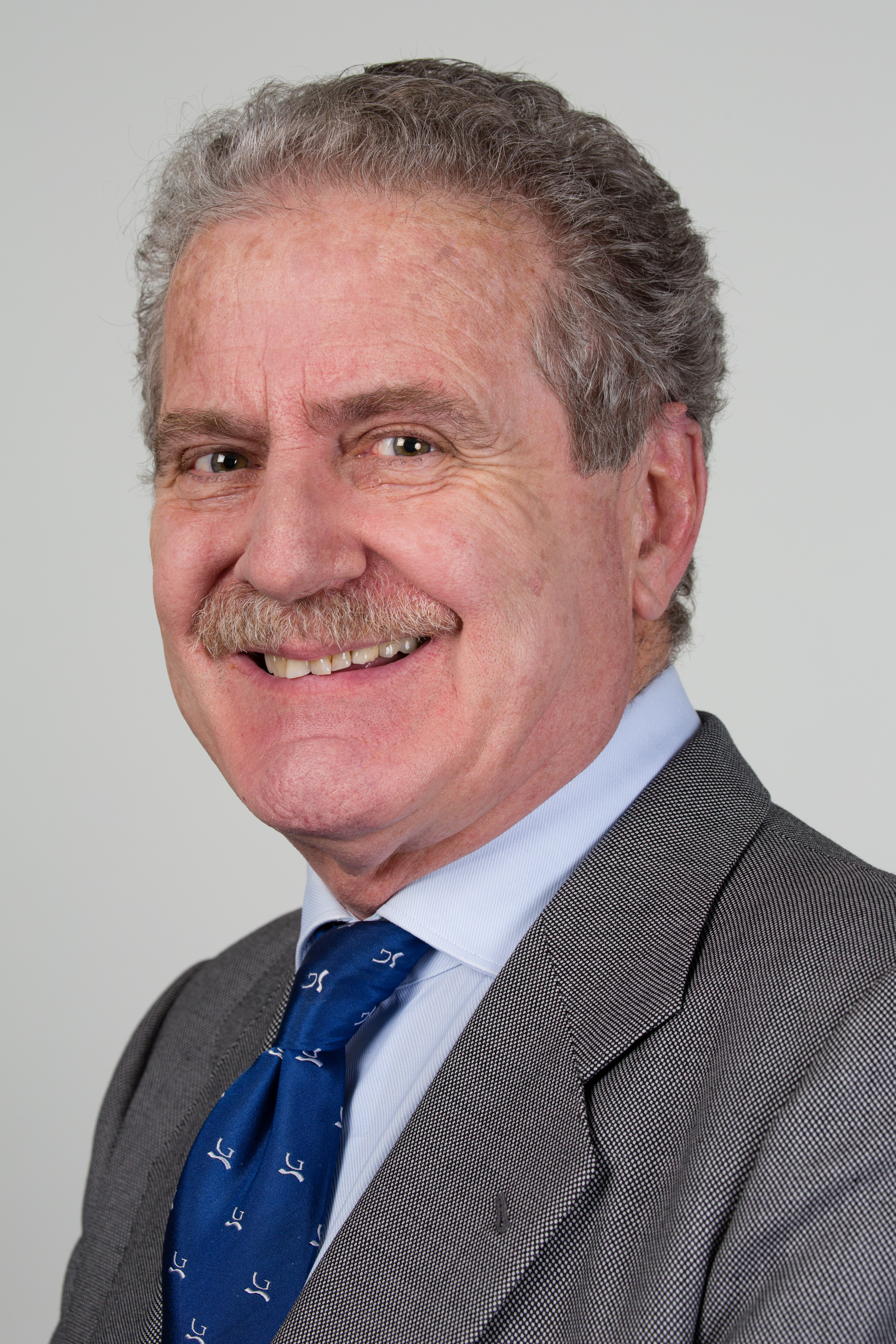
At the European Parliament in Strasbourg (2014).

Luis Yáñez-Barnuevo García (born 12 April 1943 in Coria del Río) is a Spanish politician and Member of the European Parliament for the Spanish Socialist Workers' Party, part of the Party of European Socialists. In 1977 he entered national politics when he was elected to the Spanish national parliament as a deputy for Badajoz Province and was re-elected at the 1979 election as a deputy for Seville Province, representing that district until 2004. From 1985 to 1991, he served as Secretary of State for International Cooperation and for Ibero-America of Spain.
