= Alejandro Rojas-Marcos =

Spanish politician (born 1940)

Alejandro Rojas-Marcos de la Viesca (born 2 September 1940) is a Spanish former politician of the Andalusian Party (PA).

== Biography ==
Rojas-Marcos was a member of the Congress of Deputies for Cádiz (1979–1982) and Seville (1989–1991). He was also in the Andalusian Parliament from 1994 to 1996.

In 1991, Rojas-Marcos was elected mayor of Seville after forming a pact with the People's Party led by Soledad Becerril. He remained as first deputy mayor when she succeeded him in 1995. He was mayor at the time of the Seville Expo '92. He dismissed Jesús Aguirre as director of the exposition in October 1991 for having accused him of a lack of cultural knowledge.

For the 2004 European Parliament election in Spain, Rojas-Marcos led the European Coalition, a coalition of regionalist and peripheral nationalist parties. The party lost its two seats and received roughly half a million fewer votes than it did in 1999. He put the blame on himself and the reduction of Spain's seats in the Parliament.

After a near total decline in its votes, Rojas-Marcos oversaw the PA's 17th congress in September 2015, in which the party was dissolved and he retired.

His younger brother Luis Rojas-Marcos became a noted psychiatrist in the United States.

Rojas-Marcos won two medals at the Hyrox World Championships in the Men’s 75+ age category, winning silver in 2025 and bronze in 2026.
