= Soledad Becerril =

Spanish politician (born 1944)

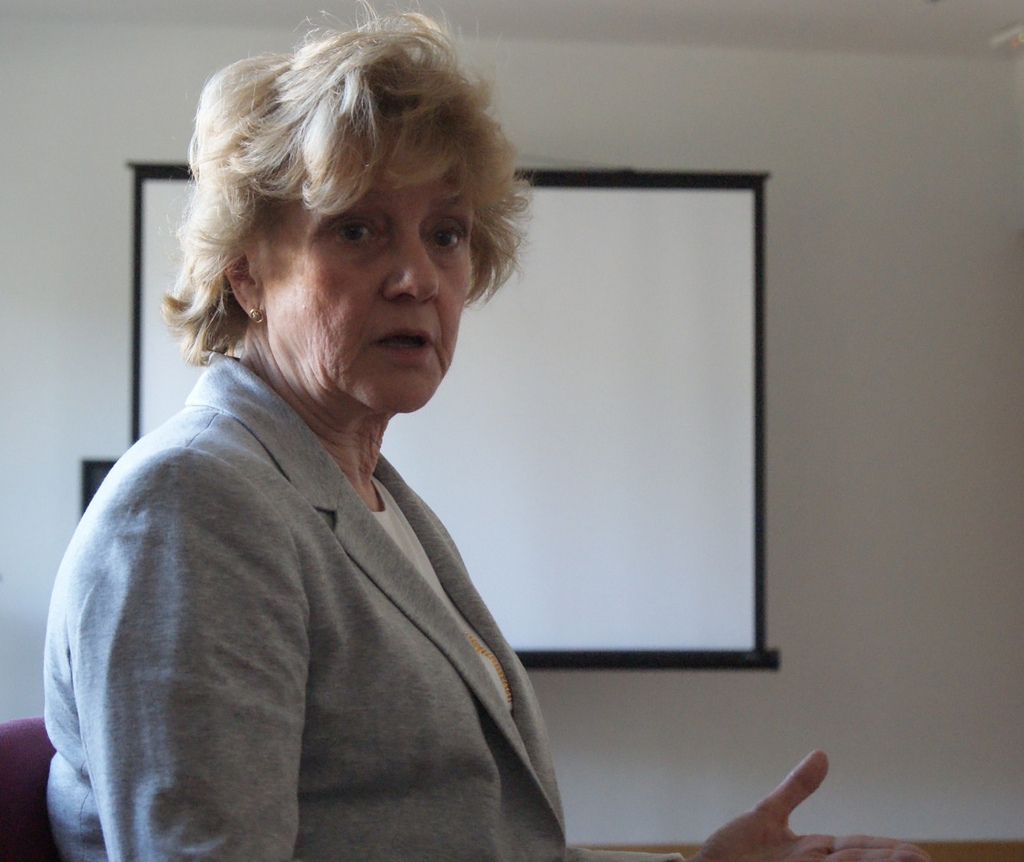
- Becerril in 2011

Ombudsman of Spain
- In office 20 June 2012 – 21 July 2017
- Monarchs: Juan Carlos I Felipe VI
- Preceded by: María Luisa Cava de Llano y Carrió
- Succeeded by: Francisco Fernández Marugán

Minister of Culture
- In office 2 December 1981 – 3 December 1982
- Monarch: Juan Carlos I
- Prime Minister: Leopoldo Calvo Sotelo
- Preceded by: Íñigo Cavero
- Succeeded by: Javier Solana

Mayor of Seville
- In office 25 June 1995 – 4 July 1999
- Preceded by: Alejandro Rojas-Marcos
- Succeeded by: Alfredo Sánchez Monteseirín

Personal details
- Born: 16 August 1944 (age 82) Madrid, Spanish State
- Party: People's Party; Union of the Democratic Centre
- Education: Complutense University of Madrid
- Awards: Order of Charles III (1982); Order of Saint Raymond of Peñafort (2017)

María de la Soledad Becerril y Bustamante, Marchioness of Salvatierra (born 16 August 1944) is a Spanish noble, politician and long serving member of the Spanish Congress of Deputies who belongs to the People's Party (PP). In 1981 she served as the first female Government Minister in almost 50 years and later became the first female Mayor of Seville. Becerril is married to Rafael Atienza y Medina, 8th Marquess of Salvatierra and Chancellor of the Royal Cavalry Armory of Seville.

== Early career ==
Married with two children, Becerril graduated in philosophy and letters at the University of Madrid, specialising in English philology. She subsequently worked as a lecturer at the University of Seville. She entered politics in 1974 when she joined the Federation of Democratic and Liberal parties and subsequently joined the Democratic Party of Andalusia (PDA). The PDA joined with other parties in May 1977 to form the Union of the Democratic Centre (UCD), a coalition which won the first democratic election since the death of Franco and the end of Francoist Spain. Becerril was elected as a UCD deputy to the Spanish Congress of Deputies representing Seville Province and was re-elected at the 1979 election.

== Minister of Culture ==
In December 1981 the new Prime Minister Leopoldo Calvo-Sotelo appointed her Minister of Culture. Becerril thus became the first female Minister in Spain since the Second Spanish Republic, almost 50 years earlier, and only the second female Spanish Minister in history after Federica Montseny in 1936.

== People's Party ==
Like most UCD deputies, she lost her seat at the 1982 General Election and the UCD disbanded in February 1983. She subsequently joined the PP and in 1989 returned to the Spanish Congress as a PP deputy and was re-elected in 1996 and 2000. In 2004 she was elected to the Spanish Senate and served one term until 2008. In 2008 she returned to the Congress of Deputies, replacing Javier Arenas as head of the PP list on the recommendation of Arenas.

== Mayor of Seville ==
Becerril also served as a local councillor in Seville. She served as Deputy Mayor from 1991 to 1995 and then Mayor of the city from 1995 to 1999 becoming the first female Mayor of Seville.

In 1998, while on her way to Switzerland to promote Seville's candidacy for the 2008 Olympics, Becerril's plane was hijacked at Valencia Airport, though the hijacker surrendered without injuring any passengers.

== Defender of the People (Ombudsman) ==
On 29 June 2012, she was appointed Defender of the People until 21 July 2017.
