= Ayuntamiento (Spain) =

Institution charged with local government and administration in Spain

An ayuntamiento is the body charged with the government and administration of the municipalities in Spain not bound to the regime of concejo abierto ('open council'). (Note: Under the concejo abierto system, which exists in municipalities with fewer than 100 inhabitants, in municipalities with a tradition of using the system or in the case of geographical circumstances that favor it, government and administration are performed by the mayor and the "neighbourhood assembly" (Spanish: Asamblea vecinal).) The ayuntamiento is one of the bodies charged with local government in Spain.

The ayuntamiento is made up of the mayor, deputy mayors and councillors and, in larger municipalities, an executive committee. Councillors are elected by universal suffrage and secret ballot and they in turn elect the mayor.

== Organisation ==
An ayuntamiento is made up of a mayor (alcalde) and the elected councillors, who compose the plenary (pleno), the deliberative body. In municipalities with over 5,000 inhabitants, there is also an executive committee (junta de gobierno or comisión de gobierno or consejo de gobierno). Such a committee is optional for smaller municipalities, at the discretion of the plenary or the regulations of the ayuntamiento. The executive committee is made up of a number of the elected councillors.

The ayuntamiento follows a collegiate-representative model, with features of a Corporatism such as the fact that the mayor is president of both the plenary and the executive. While the plenary retains the vote of censure to remove the mayor, the system confers much power upon the mayor, which has become a point of controversy.

The organizational system is described in the 1985 Local Government Act. An 11/1999 Law superseding some features of the 1985 Act set increased powers for the mayor, but the plenary also gained more scrutiny over these powers. The plenary lacks legislative autonomy.

The municipalities of Madrid and Barcelona have special rules, regulated by the 22/2006 Law of the Capital in the case of the Ayuntamiento of Madrid and by the Municipal Charter of Barcelona, approved in the 22/1998 Catalan law in the case of Barcelona.

== Electoral process ==
Municipal elections are held every four years on the same date for all municipalities in Spain. Councilors are allotted using the D'Hondt method for proportional representation with the exception of municipalities with under 100 inhabitants where block voting is used instead. The number of councilors is determined by the population of the municipality; the smallest municipalities having 5, and the largest – Madrid – having 57.

Unlike some other European countries the mayor is not directly elected. They are invested by the councillors. The indirect election, stated in the 1978 Local Elections Act was confirmed in the General Electoral System Act of 1985.

The method by which the mayor is elected is as follows. If no head of list of each electoral list commands an absolute majority of the votes of the councillors in the plenary, the head of list of the most voted list becomes mayor.

== Bibliography ==
- Canel, María José (1994). "Local government in the Spanish autonomic state". Local Government Studies. 20 (1): 44–59. doi:10.1080/03003939408433710.
- Cools, Marc; Verbeek, Leen (19–21 March 2013). Local and regional democracy in Spain. Council of Europe.
- "Local Government Act (Organic Law 7/1985)" (in Spanish). Agencia Estatal Boletín Oficial del Estado. 1985.
- Márquez Cruz, Guillermo (1999). "Veinte años de democracia local en España: elecciones, producción de gobierno, moción de censura y élite política (1979-1999)" [Twenty years of local democracy in Spain: elections, governments, censure motions and political elites (1979-1999)] (PDF). Revista de Estudios Políticos (in Spanish) (106). Madrid: Centro de Estudios Políticos y Constitucionales: 289–334. ISSN 0048-7694.
- Márquez Cruz, Guillermo (2010). "Gobernabilidad local en España". Política y Sociedad. 47 (3). Madrid: Complutense University of Madrid: 37–66. ISSN 1130-8001.
- Moreno Sardà, A; Molina Rodríguez-Navas, P; Corcoy Rius, M (2013). "La información de las administraciones públicas locales. Las webs de los ayuntamientos de Cataluña". Revista Latina de Comunicación Social. 68. La Laguna: University of La Laguna: 502–528. ISSN 1138-5820. Archived from the original on 2016-04-22.
- Rodríguez Álvarez, José Manuel (2010). "Estructura institucional y organización territorial local en España: fragmentación municipal, asociacionismo confuso, grandes ciudades y provincias supervivientes" [Institutional structure and local territorial organisation in Spain: municipal fragmentation, confusing associations, large cities and surviving provinces]. Política y Sociedad (in Spanish). 47 (3). Madrid: Complutense University of Madrid: 67–91. ISSN 1130-8001.
- Zafra Víctor, Manuel (2004). "Reflexiones sobre el gobierno local" (pdf). Anuario del Gobierno Local (1). Barcelona: Institut de Dret Públic: 97–116. ISBN 84-609-5895-7. ISSN 2013-4924. Archived (PDF) from the original on 2016-08-09.
- "Electoral Systems and Voting Procedures at Local Level". Local and Regional Authorities in Europe (68). Council of Europe: 35. January 1999. ISBN 9287139830.
