= Andalusian Party =

Andalusian Party Partido Andalucista
- Leader: Antonio Jesús Ruiz
- Founded: 1976
- Dissolved: 2015
- Preceded by: Socialist Alliance of Andalusia
- Succeeded by: Andalucía por Sí; Izquierda Andalucista; Primavera Andaluza
- Headquarters: Seville
- Youth wing: Andalucista Youth
- Ideology: Social democracy Andalusian nationalism Regionalism; Federalism; Until 1984: Socialism; Marxism
- Political position: Centre-left
- Regional affiliation: Andalusian Coalition–Andalusian Power (1994)
- European affiliation: European Free Alliance

Party flag

Website
- nacional.andalucista.org (archived)

The Andalusian Party (Spanish: Partido Andalucista, PA) was an Andalusian nationalist centre-left political party from Andalusia (Spain), with an important presence in provinces such as Cádiz and Seville although in the past they have stood in other provinces and even won seats in Barcelona to the Parliament of Catalonia.

== History ==
The party was founded as the Socialist Alliance of Andalusia (Alianza Socialista de Andalucía) in 1965 by Alejandro Rojas-Marcos. In 1976 it took the name Socialist Party of Andalusia (Partido Socialista de Andalucía). In 1979 the name was changed to Socialist Party of Andalusia - Andalusian Party (PSA-Partido Andaluz). The PA party name was adopted in 1984. Its last Secretary-General was Antonio Jesús Ruiz.

A splinter group, led by former leader Pedro Pacheco, was formed in 2001, under the name Socialist Party of Andalusia (Partido Socialista de Andalucía), later rejoined Partido Andalucista.

Historically, the party had been strong in the capital city of Andalusia, Seville, as well as other big cities like Jerez de la Frontera or Algeciras, obtaining the three cities' mayorship several times. At their 17th Congress on 12 September 2015, the party dissolved.

== Electoral performance ==
=== Parliament of Andalusia ===
Parliament of Andalusia
| Election | Votes | % | Seats | +/– | Leading candidate | Government |
| 1982 | 153,709 | 5.39 (#5) | 3 / 109 | — | Luis Uruñuela | Opposition |
| 1986 | 196,947 | 5.86 (#4) | 2 / 109 | 1 | Luis Uruñuela | Opposition |
| 1990 | 296,613 | 10.75 (#4) | 10 / 109 | 8 | Pedro Pacheco | Opposition |
| 1994 | Within PA–PAP | | 3 / 109 | 7 | Pedro Pacheco | Opposition |
| 1996 | 287,764 | 6.66 (#4) | 4 / 109 | 1 | Pedro Pacheco | Coalition |
| 2000 | 300,356 | 7.43 (#4) | 5 / 109 | 1 | Antonio Ortega | Coalition |
| 2004 | 276,674 | 6.16 (#4) | 5 / 109 | 0 | Antonio Ortega | Opposition |
| 2008 | Within CA | | 0 / 109 | 5 | Julián Álvarez | No seats |
| 2012 | 96,770 | 2.51 (#5) | 0 / 109 | 0 | Pilar González | No seats |
| 2015 | 60,645 | 1.52 (#7) | 0 / 109 | 0 | Antonio Jesús Ruiz | No seats |

=== Parliament of Catalonia ===
Parliament of Catalonia
| Election | Votes | % | Seats | +/– | Leading candidate | Government |
| 1980 | 71,841 | 2.66 (#6) | 2 / 135 | — | Francisco Hidalgo | Opposition |

== See also ==
- Andalucista Youth, the party's youth wing
- Andalusian nationalism
