= Ana Mestre =

Spanish politician (born 1981)

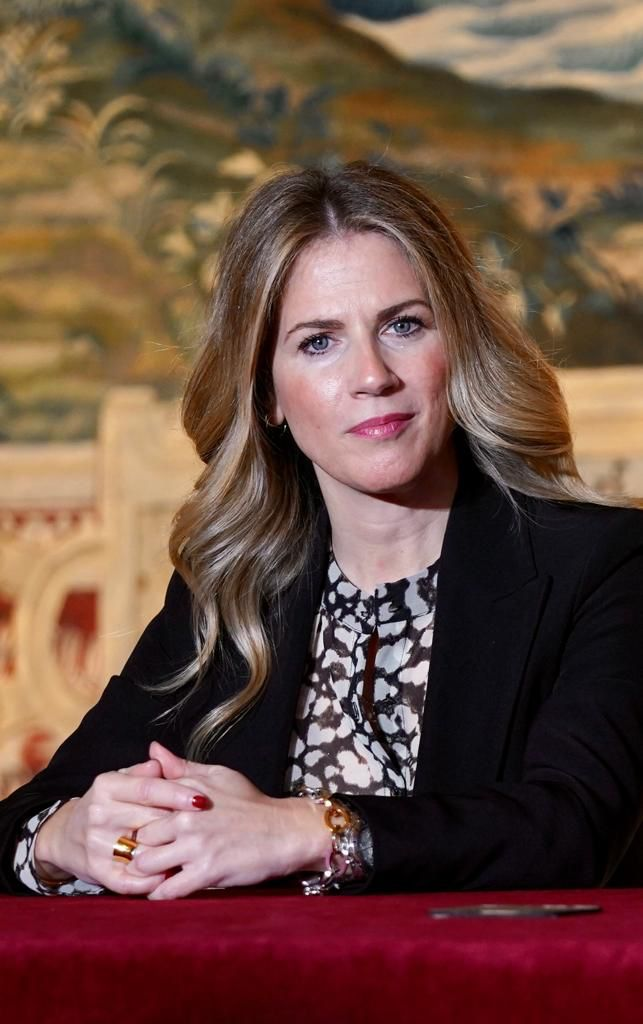

Ana María Mestre García (born 8 July 1981) is a Spanish politician of the People's Party. She has been a member of the Parliament of Andalusia from 2012 to 2019 and again since 2022, and was elected president of the Parliament of Andalusia in 2026. She was a city councillor in Cádiz (2007–2012) and Sanlúcar de Barrameda (2015–2019).

== Biography ==
Born in Jerez de la Frontera in Andalusia, Mestre became president of the New Generations of the People's Party (NNGG) her hometown in 2002 and in the Province of Cádiz from 2004 to 2006. She was elected to the city council of Cádiz in 2007, serving as the councillor in charge of education in the administration of mayor Teófila Martínez. Mestre left the Cádiz city council after being elected to the Parliament of Andalusia in the 2012 Andalusian regional election.

Mestre was the PP candidate for mayor of Sanlúcar de Barrameda in the 2015 Spanish local elections, losing to the Spanish Socialist Workers' Party (PSOE). She did not run again in 2019.

Mestre resigned from the regional parliament in February 2019 after being named the Regional Government of Andalusia's delegate in the province of Cádiz; her seat was taken by her cousin Bruno García. In the 2022 Andalusian regional election, she led the PP list in the Cádiz constituency with García in second. The party took 8 of the 15 available seats. Her party formed government and named Jesús Aguirre as president of the Parliament of Andalusia, the role of speaker, with Mestre as vice president.

In the 2026 Andalusian regional election, Mestre was second on the PP list in Cádiz, behind Antonio Sanz. Her party took seven of 15 seats. The PP came first but lost its majority, forming a government with Vox; for Vox's Cristina Peláez to take the role as vice president of the parliament, Aguirre resigned and was appointed to the Senate of Spain, while Mestre was promoted to his office.
