= List of mayors of Cádiz =

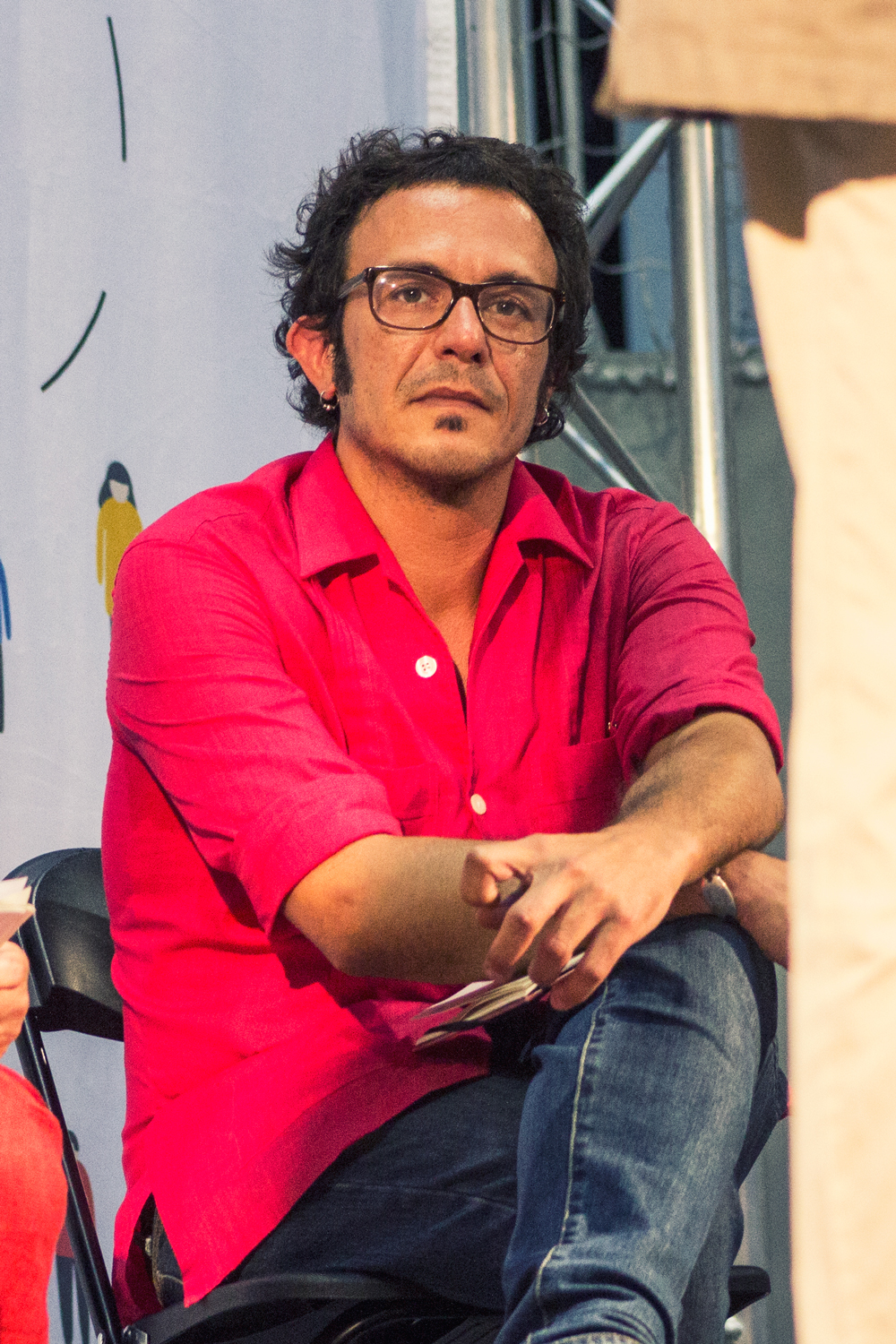
Former Mayor José María González Santos

This is a list of mayors (alcaldes) of Cádiz.

== Mayors of Cádiz ==
- Fermín Salvochea 1873-03-22 - 1873
- Eduardo Genovés Puig
- Miguel de Aguirre y Corveto 1899-07-03 - 1901-12-21
- Nicomedes Herrero y López 1901-12-31 - 1903-01-03
- Enrique Díaz Rocafull 1903-01-03 - 1905-02-24
- José Luis Gómez y de Aramburu 1905-02-24 - 1907-02-20
- Cayetano del Toro y Quartiellers 1907-02-20 - 1909-11-17
- Francisco Díaz García 1911-09-09 - 1912
- Ramón Rivas y Valladares 1912 - 1915-12-31
- Sebastián Martínez de Pinillos y Tourne 1915-12-31 - 1917-07-04
- Manuel García Noguerol 1917-07-04 - 1917-12-01
- Francisco Clotet y Miranda 1917-12-01 - 1920-04-09
- Manuel García Noguerol 1920-04-09 - 1920-04-21
- Arturo Gallego y Martínez 1920-04-21 - 1922-12-20
- Francisco Clotet y Miranda 1922-12-20 - 1923-10-05
- Manuel García Noguerol 1923-10-05 - 1925
- Agustín Blázquez y Paúl 1925 - 1927
- Ramón de Carranza y Fernández de la Reguera 1927-07-15 - 1931-04-14
- Emilio de Sola Ramons 1931-08-05 - 1933
- Manuel de la Pinta Leal 1933 - 1935
- Joaquín Fernández-Repeto 1935 - 1936
- Manuel de la Pinta Leal 1936-02-20 - 1936-07-18
- Eduardo Aranda Asquerino 1936-07-19 - 1936-07-28
- Ramón de Carranza y Fernández de la Reguera 1936-07-28 - 1936-09-13
- Juan de Dios Molina y Arroquia 1937-08-02 - 1940-06-28
- Pedro Barbadillo Delgado 1940-06-28 - 1941-11-14
- Fernando de Arbazuza y Oliva 1941-11-14 - 1942-02-07
- Alfonso Moreno Gallardo 1942-02-11 - 1947-03-20
- Francisco Sánchez Cossío 1947-03-20 - 1948-02-06
- José León de Carranza Gómez-Pablos 1948-02-08 - 1969-05-23
- Jerónimo Almagro y Montes de Oca 1969-06-25 - 1976-01-15
- Emilio Beltrami López-Linares 1976-02-01 - 1979-04-19
- Carlos Díaz Medina 1979-04-19 - 1995-06-18
- Teófila Martínez 1995-06-18 - 2015-06-13
- José María González Santos 2015-06-13 - 2023-06-17
- Bruno García 2023-06-17 - present

== See also ==
- Timeline of Cádiz
