= Jesús Aguirre (disambiguation) =

Jesús Aguirre (1934–2001) was a Spanish intellectual.

Jesús Aguirre may also refer to:

- Jesús Aguirre (athlete) (1902–1954), Mexican shot putter
- Jesús Aguirre (politician) (born 1955), Spanish doctor and politician
