= Carlos Díaz Medina =

Spanish politician (1935–2024)

Member of the Parliament of Andalusia for Cádiz
- In office 1 June 1982 – 11 June 1994

Mayor of Cádiz
- In office 19 April 1979 – 18 June 1995
- Preceded by: Emilio Beltrami López-Linares
- Succeeded by: Teófila Martínez

Personal details
- Born: Carlos Díaz Medina Banzas; 3 September 1935 Seville, Spain
- Died: 3 March 2024 (aged 88) Cádiz, Spain
- Party: PSOE
- Education: University of Seville
- Occupation: Lawyer

Carlos Díaz Medina Banzas (3 September 1935 – 3 March 2024) was a Spanish lawyer and politician. A member of the Spanish Socialist Workers' Party, he served as Mayor of Cádiz from 1979 to 1995 and served in the Parliament of Andalusia from 1982 to 1994.

Díaz Medina died in Cádiz on 3 March 2024, at the age of 88.
