= Juan José Aguirre =

Spanish Catholic bishop (born 1954)

Juan José Aguirre Muñoz (born 5 June 1954) is a Spanish Catholic bishop. A member of the Comboni Missionaries of the Heart of Jesus, he has served as bishop of the Roman Catholic Diocese of Bangassou in the Central African Republic since 21 December 2000.

== Biography ==
Aguirre grew up in a family of nine siblings, including younger brother Jesús Aguirre, a former Senator and President of the Parliament of Andalusia. On 21 April 1970, he returned home and opened his Bible on Mark 10, which inspired him to be a missionary. Having nearly signed up for the first medical courses at the University of Córdoba, he instead joined the Comboni Missionaries and studied theology, philosophy and anthropology for nine years before being ordained a priest on 13 September 1980.

In 2014, Aguirre released the book Solo soy la voz de mi pueblo ("I Am Only the Voice of My People"), chronicling his 30 years as a missionary in Africa. In November 2015, he met with Pope Francis on the pontiff's visit during the Central African Republic Civil War.

In 2017, Aguirre said that his diocese was sheltering 2,000 Muslim refugees who were fleeing anti-balaka militias in the civil war.
