= Maribel Flores (politician) =

Spanish politician (1950–2026)

María Isabel Antonia "Maribel" Flores Fernández (2 March 1950 – 2 April 2026) was a Spanish politician of the Spanish Socialist Workers' Party (PSOE). She was a member of the Parliament of Andalusia from 1990 to 2004, and a member of the Senate of Spain from 1996 to 2015.

== Life and career ==
Flores was born in Tudela in Navarre in 1950, and grew up in Córdoba in Andalusia. She was a teacher and a member of the Unión General de Trabajadores.

Flores held roles in the executive of the Spanish Socialist Workers' Party (PSOE) at provincial and regional level. She was a deputy in the Parliament of Andalusia from 1990 to 2004, and a member of the Senate of Spain from 1996 to 2015. From 1996 to 2004, she was a senator designated by the regional parliament, and from 2004 she was elected by the Córdoba constituency.

In September 2015, Flores announced that she would not run in the general election and that she was retiring from frontline politics. In December 2021, at the congress of the Córdoba branch of the PSOE in Baena, she resigned as president of the provincial organisation.

Flores died in Córdoba on 2 April 2026.
