= Mercedes López =

Spanish politician

Mercedes María López Romero (born 1980 or 1981) is a Spanish former politician. As a member of the party Citizens, she was a member of the Parliament of Andalusia from 2019 to 2022. She was the legislature's first member to have a visual impairment.

== Early and personal life ==
At the age of eight, López and friends gathered in Dalías to look at an eclipse away from their parents, who had warned them of the risk. They had a contest to look at it the longest, and she was the one who did so. At 14, she was unable to distinguish numbers on the board at school, and the ophthalmologist discovered burns. At 17, her application for a driving licence was rejected due to her vision, and she was registered with ONCE, the foundation for visual impairment. Having been unable to start courses in medicine or nursing due to her vision, López completed a physiotherapy course through ONCE's school, and later the Autonomous University of Madrid.

Ahead of the August 2026 lunar eclipse, López warned the public of the risks. She said that she retained 10% of her vision and was unable to see colours or faces, and could only distinguish people by their manner of movement. As of 2026, she had two daughters.

== Political career ==
López was the third candidate on the list for Citizens in the Almería constituency in the 2018 Andalusian regional election, and was not elected, with Marta Bosquet and Andrés Samper winning the party's two seats. In February 2019, she was appointed director general of disability for the Regional Government of Andalusia.

On 13 November 2019, López was sworn into the Parliament of Andalusia, after Samper resigned for an expenses scandal. She was the first member of the parliament to have a visual impairment. She decided not to contest the 2022 election.
