= Jesús Aguirre (politician) =

Spanish politician

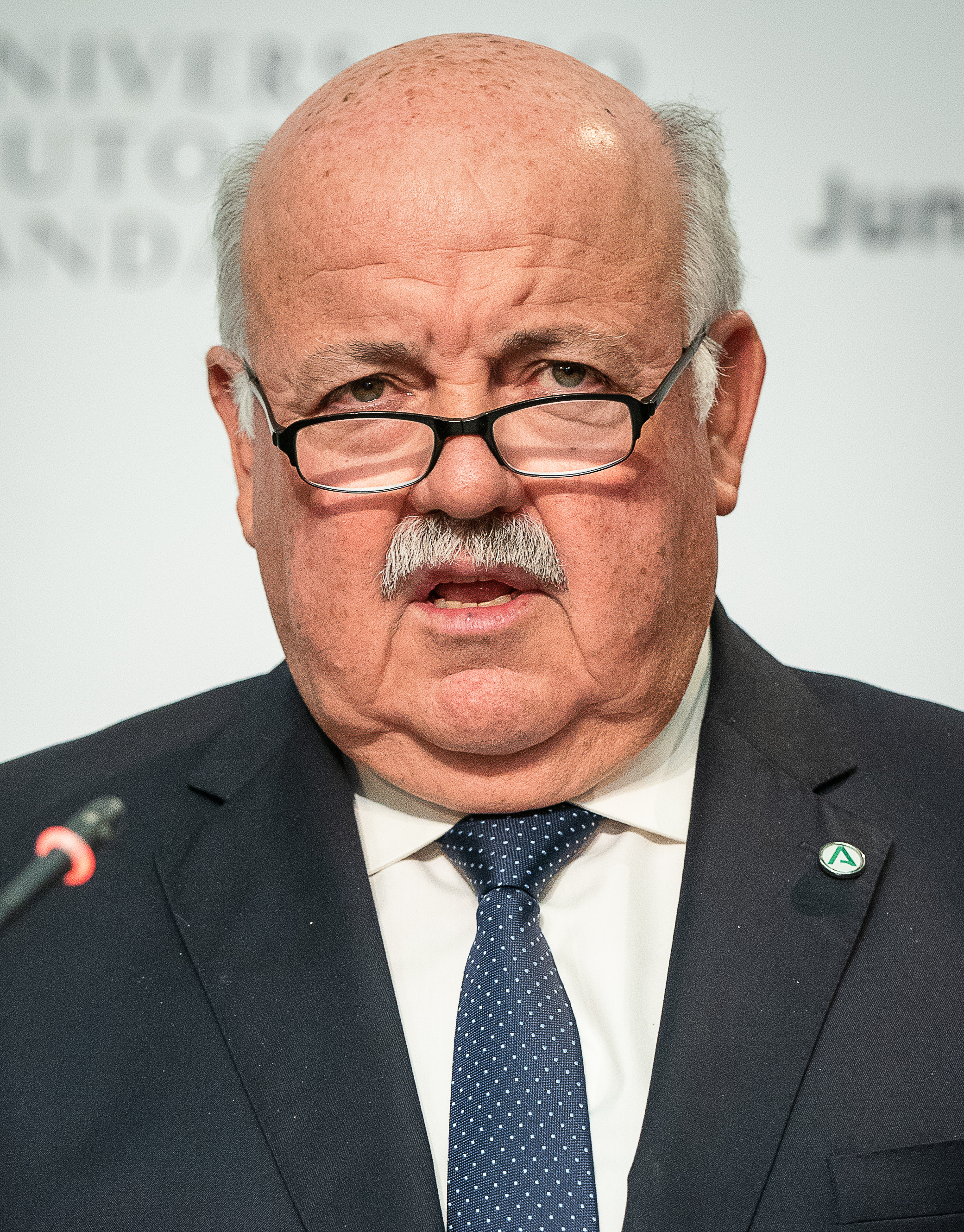

President of the Parliament of Andalusia
- In office 14 July 2022 – 23 July 2026
- Preceded by: Marta Bosquet
- Succeeded by: Ana Mestre

Regional Minister of Health and Families of Andalusia
- In office 22 January 2019 – 14 July 2022
- President: Juanma Moreno
- Preceded by: Marina Álvarez Benito (as Regional Minister of Health)
- Succeeded by: Catalina García (as Regional Minister of Health and Consumer Affairs) (interim: Elías Bendodo)

Senator
- In office 26 June 2016 – 22 January 2019
- Constituency: Córdoba
- In office 1 April 2008 – 26 October 2015
- Constituency: Córdoba

Deputy of the Parliament of Andalusia
- Incumbent
- Assumed office 14 July 2022
- Constituency: Córdoba

Personal details
- Born: 29 August 1955 (age 70) Córdoba, Spain
- Party: People's Party
- Profession: Physician, politician

Jesús Ramón Aguirre Muñoz (born 29 August 1955) is a Spanish politician of the People's Party (PP). He served in the Senate of Spain (2008–2015; 2016–2019), as the minister of health in the Regional Government of Andalusia (2019–2022) and as a member of the Parliament of Andalusia (2022–), also being President of the Parliament of Andalusia from 2022 to 2026.

== Early and personal life ==
Aguirre was born in Córdoba in Andalusia as one of nine siblings. His older brother Juan José Aguirre became bishop of the Roman Catholic Diocese of Bangassou in the Central African Republic. Aguirre graduated with a degree in medicine from the University of Córdoba in 1979.

== Political career ==
In the 2008 Spanish general election, Aguirre was one of four people elected to the Senate by the Córdoba constituency, the other three being members of the Spanish Socialist Workers' Party (PSOE). In the 2011 election, Aguirre was one of three senators elected in the constituency for the People's Party in their best-ever result, while the PSOE fell to one seat. Aguirre was second on the party list in the 2015 election, but the situation was reversed with PSOE taking three seats and the PP one. In 2016, Aguirre returned to the Senate as the situation was reversed once again.

In January 2019, Aguirre was named minister of health in the Juanma Moreno's cabinet in the Regional Government of Andalusia. He was first on the PP list in the Córdoba constituency in the 2022 Andalusian regional election, and his party took seven of 12 seats. In July 2022, he was elected President of the Parliament of Andalusia (speaker) with the votes of his party, which held the majority. He was his party's first holder of the office.

After the 2026 Andalusian regional election, the PP remained the largest party but lost its majority. A condition for the coalition government with Vox was for that party's Cristina Peláez to become vice president of the parliament; this was done by naming Aguirre as one of four senators designated by the parliament, with his vice president Ana Mestre promoted to the presidency. He was the second president of the parliament to resign his office, after the PSOE's Ángel Manuel López y López in 1988.
