= 2015 Seville municipal election =

Election in the Spanish municipality of Seville

- 24 May 2015

All 31 seats in the City Council of Seville 16 seats needed for a majority
- Opinion polls
- Registered: 545,309 ▼0.3%
- Turnout: 324,218 (59.5%) ▼3.2 pp
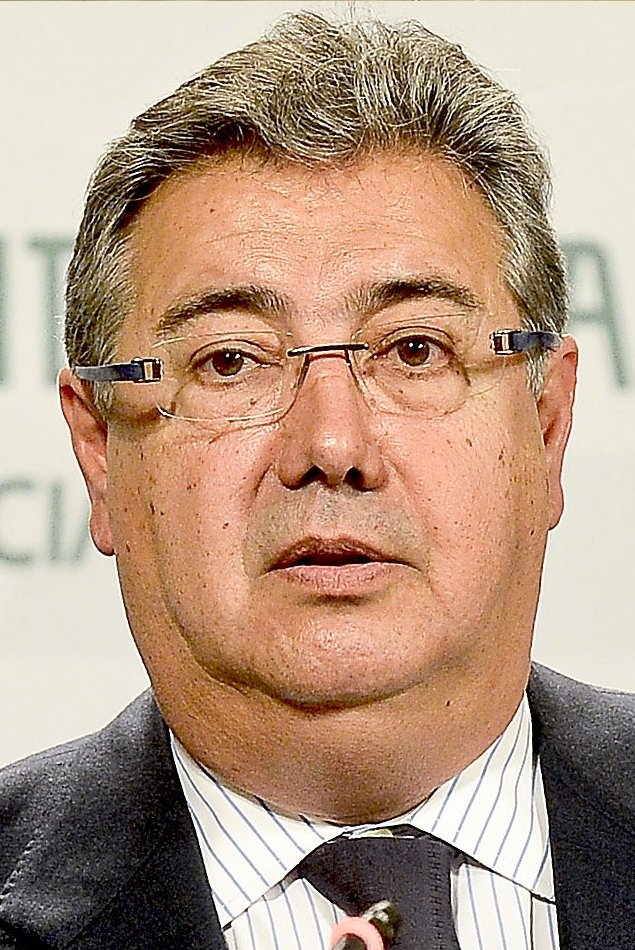

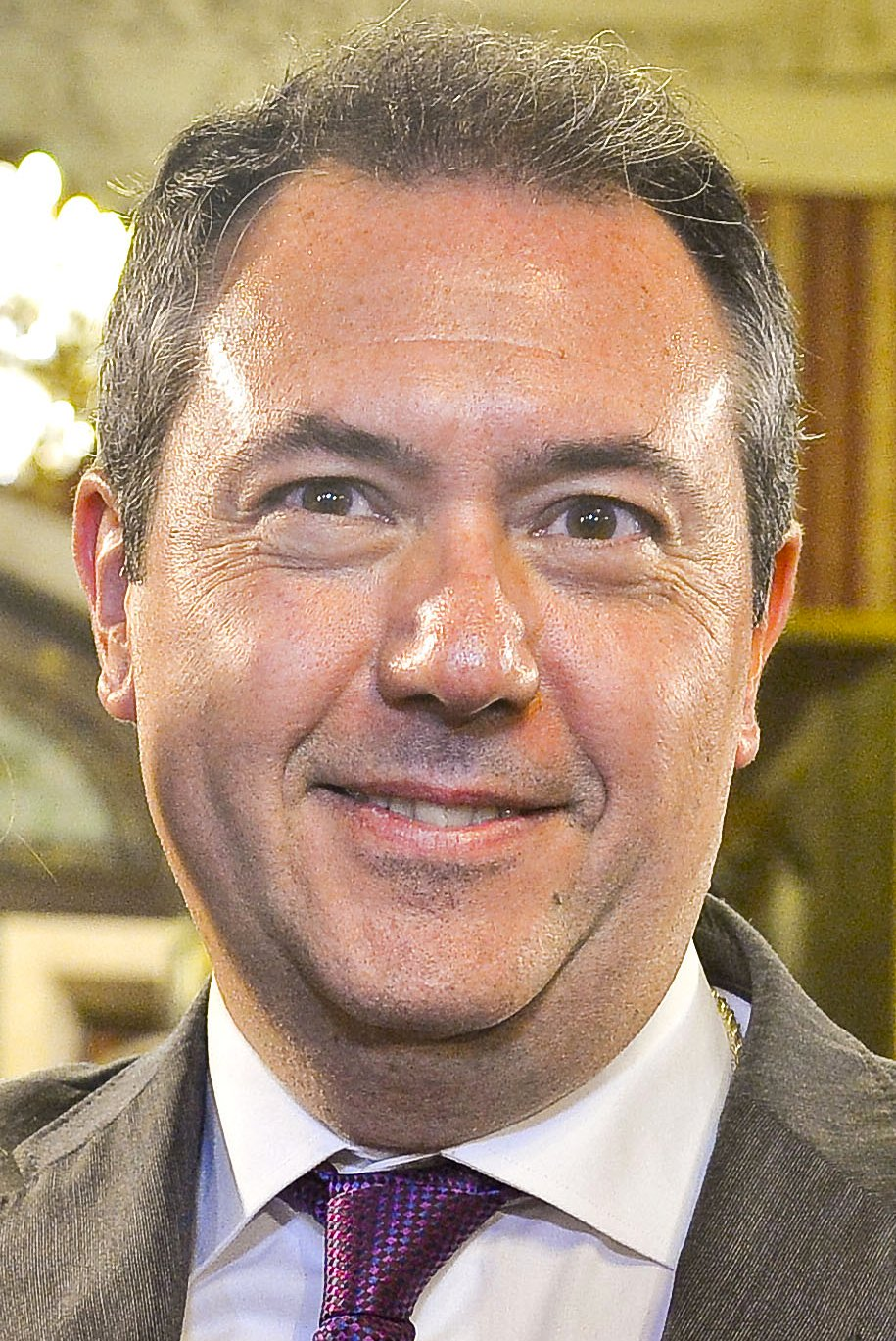

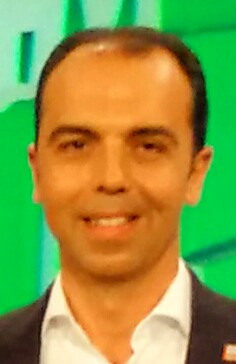

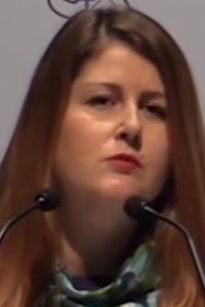

	First party	Second party	Third party
Leader	Juan Ignacio Zoido	Juan Espadas	Javier Millán
Party	PP	PSOE–A	C's
Leader since	28 June 2006	24 May 2010	6 February 2015
Last election	20 seats, 49.3%	11 seats, 29.5%	Did not contest
Seats won	12	11	3
Seat change	▼8	0	▲3
Popular vote	106,321	103,461	29,888
Percentage	33.1%	32.2%	9.3%
Swing	▼16.2 pp	▲2.7 pp	New party
	Fourth party	Fifth party
Leader	Susana Serrano	Daniel González Rojas
Party	Participa Sevilla	IULV–CA
Leader since	14 April 2015	14 February 2015
Last election	Did not contest	2 seats, 7.1%
Seats won	3	2
Seat change	▲3	0
Popular vote	28,969	19,203
Percentage	9.0%	6.0%
Swing	New party	▼1.1 pp
Mayor before election
Juan Ignacio Zoido
PP
Mayor after election
Juan Espadas
PSOE

A municipal election was held in Seville on 24 May 2015 to elect the 10th City Council of the municipality. All 31 seats in the City Council were up for election. It was held concurrently with regional elections in thirteen autonomous communities and local elections all across Spain.

== Overview ==
Under the 1978 Constitution, the governance of municipalities in Spain—part of the country's local government system—was centered on the figure of city councils (Spanish: ayuntamientos), local corporations with independent legal personality composed of a mayor, a government council and an elected legislative assembly. The mayor was indirectly elected by the local assembly, requiring an absolute majority; otherwise, the candidate from the most-voted party automatically became mayor (ties were resolved by drawing lots). In the case of Seville, the top-tier administrative and governing body was the City Council of Seville.

=== Date ===
The term of local assemblies in Spain expired four years after the date of their previous election, with election day being fixed for the fourth Sunday of May every four years. The election decree was required to be issued no later than 54 days before the scheduled election date and published on the following day in the Official State Gazette (BOE). The previous local elections were held on 22 May 2011, setting the date for election day on the fourth Sunday of May four years later, which was 24 May 2015.

Local assemblies could not be dissolved before the expiration of their term, except in cases of mismanagement that seriously harmed the public interest and implied a breach of constitutional obligations, in which case the Council of Ministers could—optionally—decide to call a by-election.

Elections to the assemblies of local entities were officially called on 31 March 2015 with the publication of the corresponding decree in the BOE, setting election day for 24 May.

=== Electoral system ===
Voting for local assemblies was based on universal suffrage, comprising all Spanish nationals over 18 years of age, registered and residing in the municipality and with full political rights (provided that they had not been deprived of the right to vote by a final sentence, nor were legally incapacitated), as well as resident non-national European citizens, and those whose country of origin allowed reciprocal voting by virtue of a treaty.

Local councillors were elected using the D'Hondt method and closed-list proportional voting, with a five percent-threshold of valid votes (including blank ballots) in each municipality. Each municipality was a multi-member constituency, with a number of seats based on the following scale:

Population	Councillors
<100	3
101–250	5
251–1,000	7
1,001–2,000	9
2,001–5,000	11
5,001–10,000	13
10,001–20,000	17
20,001–50,000	21
50,001–100,000	25
>100,001	+1 per each 100,000 inhabitants or fraction +1 if total is an even number

The law did not provide for by-elections to fill vacant seats; instead, any vacancies arising after the proclamation of candidates and during the legislative term were filled by the next candidates on the party lists or, when required, by designated substitutes.

== Parties and candidates ==
The electoral law allowed for parties and federations registered in the interior ministry, alliances and groupings of electors to present lists of candidates. Parties and federations intending to form an alliance were required to inform the relevant electoral commission within 10 days of the election call, whereas groupings of electors needed to secure the signature of a determined amount of the electors registered in the municipality for which they sought election, disallowing electors from signing for more than one list. In the case of Seville, as its population was between 300,001 and 1,000,000, at least 5,000 signatures were required. Additionally, a balanced composition of men and women was required in the electoral lists, so that candidates of either sex made up at least 40 percent of the total composition.

Below is a list of the main parties and alliances which contested the election:

Candidacy	Parties and alliances	Leading candidate	Ideology	Previous result		Gov.	Ref.
Candidacy	Parties and alliances	Leading candidate	Ideology	Vote %	Seats	Gov.	Ref.
PP	List: People's Party (PP)	Juan Ignacio Zoido	Conservatism; Christian democracy	49.3%	20	Yes	
PSOE–A	List: Spanish Socialist Workers' Party of Andalusia (PSOE–A)	Juan Espadas	Social democracy	29.5%	11	No	
IULV–CA	List: United Left/The Greens–Assembly for Andalusia (IULV–CA) – Communist Party of Andalusia (PCA) – The Dawn Marxist Organization (La Aurora (OM)) – Republican Left (IR) – Open Left (IzAb)	Daniel González Rojas	Socialism; Communism	7.1%	2	No	
Participa; Sevilla	List: We Can (Podemos)	Susana Serrano	Left-wing populism Direct democracy Democratic socialism	Did not contest		No	
C's	List: Citizens–Party of the Citizenry (C's)	Javier Millán	Liberalism	Did not contest		No	
Ganemos; Sevilla	List: Andalusian Green Current (CVA)	Laureano Seco	Left-wing populism	Did not contest		No	

== Opinion polls ==
The tables below list opinion polling results in reverse chronological order, showing the most recent first and using the dates when the survey fieldwork was done, as opposed to the date of publication. Where the fieldwork dates are unknown, the date of publication is given instead. The highest percentage figure in each polling survey is displayed with its background shaded in the leading party's colour. If a tie ensues, this is applied to the figures with the highest percentages. The "Lead" column on the right shows the percentage-point difference between the parties with the highest percentages in a poll.

=== Voting intention estimates ===
The table below lists weighted voting intention estimates. Refusals are generally excluded from the party vote percentages, while question wording and the treatment of "don't know" responses and those not intending to vote may vary between polling organisations. When available, seat projections determined by the polling organisations are displayed below (or in place of) the percentages in a smaller font; 16 seats were required for an absolute majority in the City Council of Seville (17 in the 2011 election).

Color key:

Poll conducted after legal ban on opinion polls Exit poll

Polling firm/Commissioner	Fieldwork date	Sample size	Turnout	PP	PSOE–A	IULV	PA	UPyD	Participa Sevilla	C's	GS	Lead
2015 municipal election	24 May 2015	—N/a	59.5	33.1; 12	32.2; 11	6.0; 2	1.4; 0	0.8; 0	9.0; 3	9.3; 3	4.1; 0	0.9
TNS Demoscopia/RTVE–FORTA	24 May 2015	?	?	? 10/12	? 12/14	6.7; 1/2	–	–	? 3/4	9.6; 3/4	–	?
GAD3/Antena 3	11–22 May 2015	?	?	? 11/12	? 13/14	? 0/1	–	–	? 3/4	? 2	–	?
Sigma Dos/El Mundo	13–14 May 2015	500	?	34.8; 12/13	32.6; 11/12	7.4; 2	–	–	6.1; 2	10.4; 3	4.2; 0	2.2
Deimos/El Correo de Andalucía	11–14 May 2015	806	?	30.0; 11	31.7; 11	6.9; 2	1.7; 0	1.4; 0	8.1; 3	12.8; 4	3.6; 0	1.7
MyWord/Cadena SER	27 Apr–14 May 2015	800	?	31.6; 10/12	32.2; 10/12	4.3; 0/1	0.7; 0	1.3; 0	15.0; 4/6	11.4; 4	(Note: Within Participa Sevilla.)	0.6
JM&A/Público	12 May 2015	?	?	? 13	? 10	–	–	–	? 6	? 4	–	?
JM&A/Público	3 May 2015	?	?	28.1; 10	30.3; 10	5.9; 2	2.0; 0	0.5; 0	17.2; 6	14.2; 5		2.2
IMC/ABC	29–30 Apr 2015	410	?	33.4; 12/13	30.2; 10/11	5.2; 0/1	–	–	11.0; 3/4	13.2; 4/5		3.2
Commentia/Grupo Joly	27–29 Apr 2015	401	?	35.5; 12	31.3; 10	4.9; 0/1	–	–	13.1; 4/5	11.5; 4		4.2
CIS	23 Mar–19 Apr 2015	997	?	32.4; 11/12	28.5; 10	5.0; 1	–	1.0; 0	(Note: Within Ganemos Sevilla.)	12.6; 4	13.4; 4/5	3.9
Sigma Dos/El Mundo	26–27 Mar 2015	500	?	31.3; 10/11	33.2; 11/12	4.6; 0/1	–	–	14.6; 4/5	11.9; 4		1.9
2015 regional election	22 Mar 2015	—N/a	68.3	27.1 (9)	30.8 (11)	5.4 (1)	1.0 (0)	2.1 (0)	18.0 (6)	11.5 (4)	–	3.7
Llorente & Cuenca	31 Oct 2014	?	?	? 14/15	? 9/10	? 3	–	? 0/1	? 6/8	–	–	?
2014 EP election	25 May 2014	—N/a	47.6	27.8 (11)	30.0 (12)	9.6 (3)	1.4 (0)	8.0 (3)	9.8 (4)	2.3 (0)	–	2.2
Nexo	24 Mar–4 Apr 2014	402	54.2	42.9; 16/18	29.2; 11/12	9.3; 3/4	–	5.3; 2	–	–	–	13.7
2012 regional election	25 Mar 2012	—N/a	65.1	42.8 (16)	37.4 (14)	9.4 (3)	2.5 (0)	4.6 (0)	–	–	–	5.1
2011 general election	20 Nov 2011	—N/a	71.1	44.3 (16)	36.4 (13)	6.6 (2)	1.8 (0)	6.8 (2)	–	–	–	7.9
2011 municipal election	22 May 2011	—N/a	62.7	49.3; 20	29.5; 11	7.1; 2	4.8; 0	3.3; 0	–	–	–	19.8

=== Voting preferences ===
The table below lists raw, unweighted voting preferences.

Polling firm/Commissioner	Fieldwork date	Sample size	PP	PSOE–A	IULV	PA	UPyD	Participa Sevilla	C's	GS	Question	X mark	Lead
2015 municipal election	24 May 2015	—N/a	19.5	19.0	3.5	0.8	0.5	5.3	5.5	2.4	—N/a	40.5	0.5
MyWord/Cadena SER	27 Apr–14 May 2015	800	18.9	15.9	4.5	1.1	1.4	12.9	9.4		25.6	5.0	3.0
CIS	23 Mar–19 Apr 2015	997	15.1	19.3	3.4	–	0.1		6.4	9.9	34.1	7.9	4.2
2015 regional election (Note: Does not include non-resident citizens.)	22 Mar 2015	—N/a	18.4	20.9	3.7	0.7	1.4	12.2	7.8	–	—N/a	31.7	2.5
2014 EP election	25 May 2014	—N/a	13.1	14.1	4.5	0.7	3.8	4.6	1.1	–	—N/a	52.4	1.0
2012 regional election	25 Mar 2012	—N/a	27.7	24.2	6.1	1.6	3.0	–	–	–	—N/a	34.9	3.5
2011 general election	20 Nov 2011	—N/a	31.2	25.6	4.7	1.3	4.8	–	–	–	—N/a	28.9	5.6
2011 municipal election	22 May 2011	—N/a	30.4	18.1	4.4	2.9	2.0	–	–	–	—N/a	37.3	12.3

=== Victory preferences ===
The table below lists opinion polling on the victory preferences for each party in the event of a municipal election taking place.

Polling firm/Commissioner	Fieldwork date	Sample size	PP	PSOE–A	IULV	UPyD	Participa Sevilla	C's	GS	Other/ None	Question	Lead
CIS	23 Mar–19 Apr 2015	997	17.8	26.4	4.7	0.5		8.3	11.2	8.7	22.4	8.6

=== Victory likelihood ===
The table below lists opinion polling on the perceived likelihood of victory for each party in the event of a municipal election taking place.

Polling firm/Commissioner	Fieldwork date	Sample size	PP	PSOE–A	Participa Sevilla	C's	GS	Other/ None	Question	Lead
CIS	23 Mar–19 Apr 2015	997	17.0	41.8		0.3	1.6	1.2	38.1	24.8

== Results ==
← Summary of the 24 May 2015 City Council of Seville election results →
Parties and alliances	Popular vote			Seats	
Parties and alliances	Votes	%	±pp	Total	+/−
People's Party (PP)	106,321	33.05	−16.26	12	−8
Spanish Socialist Workers' Party of Andalusia (PSOE–A)	103,461	32.16	+2.71	11	±0
Citizens–Party of the Citizenry (C's)	29,888	9.29	New	3	+3
Participate Seville (Participa Sevilla)	28,969	9.01	New	3	+3
United Left/The Greens–Assembly for Andalusia (IULV–CA)	19,203	5.97	−1.18	2	±0
Let's Win Seville (Ganemos Sevilla)	13,274	4.13	New	0	±0
Andalusian Party (PA)	4,544	1.41	−3.37	0	±0
Equo (Equo)	3,332	1.04	New	0	±0
Animalist Party Against Mistreatment of Animals (PACMA)	3,290	1.02	+0.60	0	±0
Union, Progress and Democracy (UPyD)	2,711	0.84	−2.41	0	±0
Vox (Vox)	1,495	0.46	New	0	±0
Blank Seats (EB)	463	0.14	New	0	±0
Spanish Phalanx of the CNSO (FE de las JONS)	311	0.10	+0.02	0	±0
Party of the Immigrant in Spain (PADIE)	182	0.06	New	0	±0
Communist Party of the Peoples of Spain (PCPE)	168	0.05	New	0	±0
Republican Candidacy (CR)	155	0.05	New	0	±0
Internationalist Solidarity and Self-Management (SAIn)	139	0.04	−0.05	0	±0
Andalusian Nationalist People (PNdeA)	89	0.03	New	0	±0
Andalusian Popular Unity (UPAN)	61	0.02	−0.04	0	±0
Blank ballots	3,633	1.13	−1.65		
Total	321,689			31	−2
Valid votes	321,689	99.22	+1.08		
Invalid votes	2,529	0.78	−1.08		
Votes cast / turnout	324,218	59.46	−3.27		
Abstentions	221,091	40.54	+3.27		
Registered voters	545,309				

Popular vote
PP	33.05%
PSOE–A	32.16%
C's	9.29%
Participa Sevilla	9.01%
IULV–CA	5.97%
Ganemos Sevilla	4.13%
PA	1.41%
eQuo	1.04%
PACMA	1.02%
Others	1.79%
Blank ballots	1.13%

Seats
PP	38.71%
PSOE–A	35.48%
C's	9.68%
Participa Sevilla	9.68%
IULV–CA	6.45%

== Aftermath ==
=== Government formation ===
Investiture
Ballot →	14 June 2015	
Required majority →	16 out of 31	
Juan Espadas (PSOE–A): • PSOE–A (11); • Participa Sevilla (3); • IULV–CA (2)	16 / 31	check
Juan Ignacio Zoido (PP): • PP (12)	12 / 31	X mark
Javier Millán (C's): • C's (3)	3 / 31	X mark
Abstentions/Blank ballots	0 / 31	
Absentees	0 / 31	

== Bibliography ==
- Constitución Española (Constitution). Official State Gazette (in Spanish). 27 December 1978 [version as of 27 September 2011]. BOE-A-1978-31229.
- Ley 7/1985, de 2 de abril, Reguladora de las Bases del Régimen Local (Law 7/1985). Official State Gazette (in Spanish). 2 April 1985 [version as of 30 December 2013]. BOE-A-1985-5392.
- Ley Orgánica 5/1985, de 19 de junio, del Régimen Electoral General (Organic Law 5/1985). Official State Gazette (in Spanish). 19 June 1985 [version as of 31 March 2015]. BOE-A-1985-11672.
- Real Decreto 233/2015, de 30 de marzo, por el que se convocan elecciones locales y a las Asambleas de Ceuta y Melilla para el 24 de mayo de 2015 (Royal Decree 233/2015). Official State Gazette (in Spanish). 30 March 2015. BOE-A-2015-3448.
