= Bruno García (politician) =

Spanish politician

Bruno García de León (born 14 July 1979) is a Spanish People's Party (PP) politician. He was elected mayor of Cádiz in 2023. He had previously been a councillor in the same city (2007–2019) and a member of the Parliament of Andalusia (2019–2023).

== Biography ==
García was born in Jerez de la Frontera and grew up in his father's hometown of Sanlúcar de Barrameda in the Bay of Cádiz. As a child, he watched television broadcasts of the House of Commons of the United Kingdom. He graduated in law from the Complutense University of Madrid.

García was first elected to Cádiz City Hall in 2007, serving as the councillor responsible for tourism in the People's Party (PP) government of mayor Teófila Martínez; from 2011, his responsibilities expanded to economic development. From 2015, he sat in the opposition as the left-wing mayor José María González Santos "Kichi" presided.

In the 2018 Andalusian regional election, García was fifth on the PP's list in the Cádiz constituency, from which three were elected. In February 2019, he took the seat vacated by his cousin Ana Mestre who became the delegate of the Regional Government of Andalusia in the province. In April 2021, he succeeded her as leader of the PP in the province.

In the 2022 Andalusian regional election, García was re-elected as number two behind Mestre on the PP list in Cádiz. In January 2023, he was confirmed as the party's candidate for mayor of Cádiz in the May local elections. He recovered the city for his party after eight years in opposition, gaining eight seats to take 14 of 27 available. He also left his parliamentary seat in June 2023.
