= 2011 Seville municipal election =

Election in the Spanish municipality of Seville

- 22 May 2011

All 33 seats in the City Council of Seville 17 seats needed for a majority
- Opinion polls
- Registered: 546,944 ▼3.3%
- Turnout: 343,098 (62.7%) ▲8.1 pp
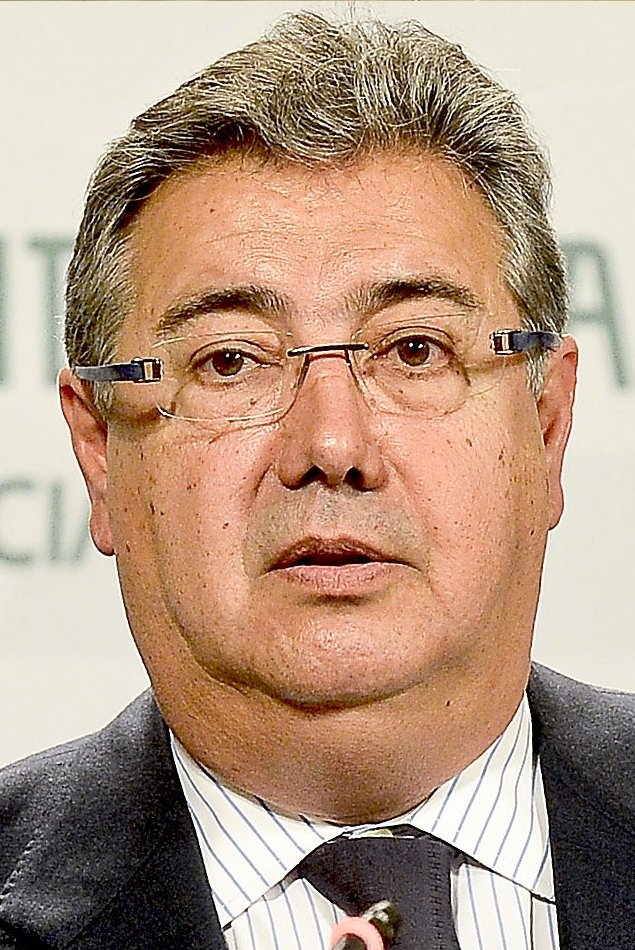

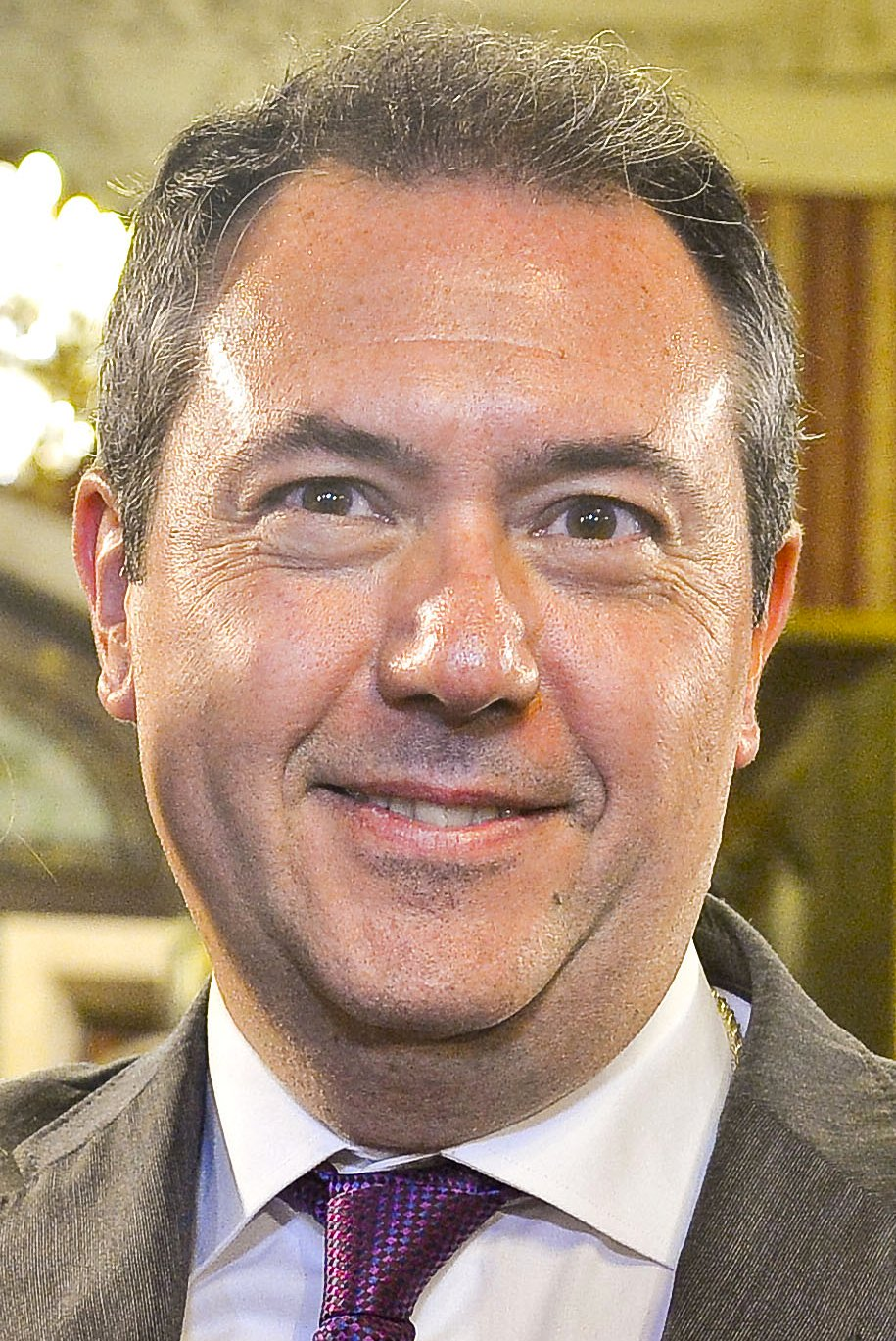

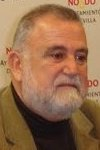
| | First party | Second party | Third party |
|---|---|---|---|
| Leader | Juan Ignacio Zoido | Juan Espadas | Antonio Rodrigo |
| Party | PP | PSOE–A | IULV–CA |
| Leader since | 28 June 2006 | 24 May 2010 | 2007 |
| Last election | 15 seats, 41.8% | 15 seats, 40.5% | 3 seats, 8.4% |
| Seats won | 20 | 11 | 2 |
| Seat change | ▲5 | ▼4 | ▼1 |
| Popular vote | 166,040 | 99,168 | 24,066 |
| Percentage | 49.3% | 29.5% | 7.1% |
| Swing | ▲7.5 pp | ▼11.0 pp | ▼1.3 pp |
Mayor before election
Alfredo Sánchez Monteseirín
PSOE
Mayor after election
Juan Ignacio Zoido
PP

A municipal election was held in Seville on 22 May 2011 to elect the 9th City Council of the municipality. All 33 seats in the City Council were up for election. It was held concurrently with regional elections in thirteen autonomous communities and local elections all across Spain.

== Overview ==
Under the 1978 Constitution, the governance of municipalities in Spain—part of the country's local government system—was centered on the figure of city councils (Spanish: ayuntamientos), local corporations with independent legal personality composed of a mayor, a government council and an elected legislative assembly. The mayor was indirectly elected by the local assembly, requiring an absolute majority; otherwise, the candidate from the most-voted party automatically became mayor (ties were resolved by drawing lots). In the case of Seville, the top-tier administrative and governing body was the City Council of Seville.

=== Date ===
The term of local assemblies in Spain expired four years after the date of their previous election, with election day being fixed for the fourth Sunday of May every four years. The election decree was required to be issued no later than 54 days before the scheduled election date and published on the following day in the Official State Gazette (BOE). The previous local elections were held on 27 May 2007, setting the date for election day on the fourth Sunday of May four years later, which was 22 May 2011.

Local assemblies could not be dissolved before the expiration of their term, except in cases of mismanagement that seriously harmed the public interest and implied a breach of constitutional obligations, in which case the Council of Ministers could—optionally—decide to call a by-election.

Elections to the assemblies of local entities were officially called on 29 March 2011 with the publication of the corresponding decree in the BOE, setting election day for 22 May.

=== Electoral system ===
Voting for local assemblies was based on universal suffrage, comprising all Spanish nationals over 18 years of age, registered and residing in the municipality and with full political rights (provided that they had not been deprived of the right to vote by a final sentence, nor were legally incapacitated), as well as resident non-national European citizens, and those whose country of origin allowed reciprocal voting by virtue of a treaty.

Local councillors were elected using the D'Hondt method and closed-list proportional voting, with a five percent-threshold of valid votes (including blank ballots) in each municipality. Each municipality was a multi-member constituency, with a number of seats based on the following scale (amended for smaller municipalities in 2011):

| Population | Councillors |
|---|---|
| <100 | 3 |
| 101–250 | 5 |
| 251–1,000 | 7 |
| 1,001–2,000 | 9 |
| 2,001–5,000 | 11 |
| 5,001–10,000 | 13 |
| 10,001–20,000 | 17 |
| 20,001–50,000 | 21 |
| 50,001–100,000 | 25 |
| >100,001 | +1 per each 100,000 inhabitants or fraction +1 if total is an even number |

The law did not provide for by-elections to fill vacant seats; instead, any vacancies arising after the proclamation of candidates and during the legislative term were filled by the next candidates on the party lists or, when required, by designated substitutes.

== Parties and candidates ==
The electoral law allowed for parties and federations registered in the interior ministry, alliances and groupings of electors to present lists of candidates. Parties and federations intending to form an alliance were required to inform the relevant electoral commission within 10 days of the election call, whereas groupings of electors needed to secure the signature of a determined amount of the electors registered in the municipality for which they sought election, disallowing electors from signing for more than one list. In the case of Seville, as its population was between 300,001 and 1,000,000, at least 5,000 signatures were required. Additionally, a balanced composition of men and women was required in the electoral lists, so that candidates of either sex made up at least 40 percent of the total composition.

Below is a list of the main parties and alliances which contested the election:

| Candidacy | Parties and alliances | Leading candidate | Ideology | Previous result | | Gov. | Ref. |
| Candidacy | Parties and alliances | Leading candidate | Ideology | Vote % | Seats | Gov. | Ref. |
|---|---|---|---|---|---|---|---|
| PP | List: People's Party (PP) | Juan Ignacio Zoido | Conservatism; Christian democracy | 41.8% | 15 | No | |
| PSOE–A | List: Spanish Socialist Workers' Party of Andalusia (PSOE–A) | Juan Espadas | Social democracy | 40.5% | 15 | Yes | |
| IULV–CA | List: United Left/The Greens–Assembly for Andalusia (IULV–CA) – Communist Party of Andalusia (PCA) – Collective for the Unity of Workers–Andalusian Left Bloc (CUT–BAI) – Revolutionary Workers' Party (POR) – Republican Left (IR) | Antonio Rodrigo | Socialism; Communism | 8.4% | 3 | Yes | |
| PA | List: Andalusian Party (PA) | Pilar González | Andalusian nationalism Social democracy | 4.5% | 0 | No | |

== Opinion polls ==
The tables below list opinion polling results in reverse chronological order, showing the most recent first and using the dates when the survey fieldwork was done, as opposed to the date of publication. Where the fieldwork dates are unknown, the date of publication is given instead. The highest percentage figure in each polling survey is displayed with its background shaded in the leading party's colour. If a tie ensues, this is applied to the figures with the highest percentages. The "Lead" column on the right shows the percentage-point difference between the parties with the highest percentages in a poll.

=== Voting intention estimates ===
The table below lists weighted voting intention estimates. Refusals are generally excluded from the party vote percentages, while question wording and the treatment of "don't know" responses and those not intending to vote may vary between polling organisations. When available, seat projections determined by the polling organisations are displayed below (or in place of) the percentages in a smaller font; 17 seats were required for an absolute majority in the City Council of Seville.

| Polling firm/Commissioner | Fieldwork date | Sample size | Turnout | PP | PSOE–A | IULV | PA | UPyD | Lead |
|---|---|---|---|---|---|---|---|---|---|
| 2011 municipal election | 22 May 2011 | —N/a | 62.7 | 49.3; 20 | 29.4; 11 | 7.1; 2 | 4.8; 0 | 3.2; 0 | 19.9 |
| Metroscopia/El País | 12–13 May 2011 | 1,000 | 60.0 | 46.6; 18 | 31.1; 12 | 8.2; 3 | 4.3; 0 | – | 15.5 |
| Sigma Dos/El Mundo (Note: "El PP gobernará Sevilla con mayoría absoluta y el PA regresará al Ayuntamiento". El Mundo (in Spanish). 16 May 2011. (subscription required)) | 10–12 May 2011 | 400 | ? | 49.0; 17/18 | 35.4; 12/13 | 6.1; 2 | 5.3; 1 | – | 13.6 |
| GAD/COPE | 2 May 2011 | ? | ? | 46.8; 17 | 37.3; 13 | 6.5; 2 | 5.3; 1 | – | 9.5 |
| Infortécnica (Note: Undecided and/or abstentionists excluded.) | 1–30 Apr 2011 | 388 | ? | 53.2; 16/19 | 31.9; 10/12 | 5.0; 0/2 | 5.5; 0/2 | – | 21.3 |
| Ikerfel/Vocento | 16–28 Apr 2011 | 650 | ? | 51.3; 18/19 | 33.7; 12/13 | 8.2; 2/3 | 2.8; 0 | – | 17.6 |
| TNS Demoscopia/Antena 3 | 25–26 Apr 2011 | 500 | ? | 47.2; 17/18 | 33.8; 12/13 | 9.3; 3 | 4.4; 0 | 1.8; 0 | 13.4 |
| Sigma Dos/El Mundo | 15–19 Apr 2011 | 400 | ? | 48.3; 17/18 | 38.4; 13/14 | 7.5; 2 | – | – | 9.9 |
| CIS | 17 Mar–17 Apr 2011 | 1,000 | ? | 44.4; 16/17 | 36.7; 13/14 | 8.7; 3 | 3.4; 0 | 1.7; 0 | 7.7 |
| Commentia/Grupo Joly | 13–15 Apr 2011 | ? | ? | 46.1; 17 | 36.3; 13 | 8.5; 3 | – | – | 9.8 |
| Deguadaíra/Sevilla Actualidad | 3 Mar–3 Apr 2011 | 625 | ? | 41.4; 15/17 | 34.7; 12/13 | 6.5; 2/3 | 5.3; 0/2 | – | 6.7 |
| Infortécnica | 16 Mar 2011 | 397 | ? | 47.3; 16/18 | 29.3; 9/12 | 12.2; 3/5 | 9.2; 0/3 | – | 18.0 |
| Infortécnica | 1–28 Feb 2011 | 413 | ? | 46.9; 16/18 | 35.5; 11/13 | 6.2; 0/3 | 9.3; 0/3 | – | 11.4 |
| Commentia/Grupo Joly | 8–14 Feb 2011 | 400 | ? | 45.9; 17 | 35.7; 13 | 8.2; 3 | 4.5; 0 | – | 10.2 |
| RedPeriodistas.es | 4–8 Oct 2010 | 1,869 | ? | 40.6; 17/18 | 27.8; 12/13 | 5.2; 1/2 | 3.8; 0 | 4.3; 0/1 | 12.8 |
| UGR/PA | 7–17 Jun 2010 | 600 | ? | 44.5; 16 | 39.2; 14 | 6.1; 2 | 5.2; 1 | – | 5.3 |
| Sigma Dos/PP | 3–6 May 2010 | 1,000 | ? | 46.8; 17/18 | 38.2; 13/14 | 6.5; 2 | 3.4; 0 | – | 8.6 |
| 2009 EP election | 7 Jun 2009 | —N/a | 44.2 | 41.0 (16) | 45.5 (17) | 4.1 (0) | 0.8 (0) | 4.6 (0) | 4.5 |
| PP | 21 Dec 2008 | 500 | ? | 47.7; 17/18 | 37.3; 13/14 | 7.1; 2 | 2.4; 0 | – | 10.4 |
| 2008 regional election | 9 Mar 2008 | —N/a | 73.4 | 39.0 (14) | 47.7 (17) | 6.3 (2) | 2.5 (0) | 1.3 (0) | 8.7 |
| 2008 general election | 9 Mar 2008 | —N/a | 73.5 | 38.2 (14) | 52.0 (19) | 4.1 (0) | 1.3 (0) | 1.9 (0) | 13.8 |
| 2007 municipal election | 27 May 2007 | —N/a | 54.6 | 41.8; 15 | 40.5; 15 | 8.4; 3 | 4.5; 0 | – | 1.3 |

=== Voting preferences ===
The table below lists raw, unweighted voting preferences.

| Polling firm/Commissioner | Fieldwork date | Sample size | PP | PSOE–A | IULV | PA | UPyD | Question | X mark | Lead |
|---|---|---|---|---|---|---|---|---|---|---|
| 2011 municipal election | 22 May 2011 | —N/a | 30.4 | 18.1 | 4.4 | 2.9 | 2.0 | —N/a | 37.3 | 12.3 |
| Infortécnica | 1–30 Apr 2011 | 388 | 33.7 | 20.2 | 3.2 | 3.5 | – | 23.8 | 12.8 | 13.5 |
| CIS | 17 Mar–17 Apr 2011 | 1,000 | 24.6 | 24.1 | 4.5 | 1.1 | 1.4 | 26.2 | 13.4 | 0.5 |
| Infortécnica | 16 Mar 2011 | 397 | 27.6 | 17.1 | 7.1 | 5.4 | – | 41.6 | 1.3 | 10.5 |
| Infortécnica | 1–28 Feb 2011 | 413 | 27.1 | 20.5 | 3.6 | 5.4 | – | 42.2 | 1.2 | 6.6 |
| Commentia/Grupo Joly | 8–14 Feb 2011 | 400 | 24.9 | 15.4 | 3.9 | 0.6 | – | 45.6 | 5.2 | 9.5 |
| 2009 EP election (Note: Does not include non-resident citizens.) | 7 Jun 2009 | —N/a | 18.0 | 20.0 | 1.8 | 0.3 | 2.0 | —N/a | 55.8 | 2.0 |
| 2008 regional election | 9 Mar 2008 | —N/a | 28.5 | 34.9 | 4.6 | 1.8 | 1.0 | —N/a | 26.6 | 6.4 |
| 2008 general election | 9 Mar 2008 | —N/a | 28.0 | 38.1 | 3.0 | 1.0 | 1.4 | —N/a | 26.5 | 10.1 |
| 2007 municipal election | 27 May 2007 | —N/a | 22.8 | 22.0 | 4.6 | 2.4 | – | —N/a | 45.4 | 0.8 |

=== Victory preferences ===
The table below lists opinion polling on the victory preferences for each party in the event of a municipal election taking place.

| Polling firm/Commissioner | Fieldwork date | Sample size | PP | PSOE–A | IULV | PA | UPyD | Other/ None | Question | Lead |
|---|---|---|---|---|---|---|---|---|---|---|
| GAD/COPE | 2 May 2011 | ? | 42.0 | 33.0 | – | – | – | 25.0 | | 9.0 |
| CIS | 17 Mar–17 Apr 2011 | 1,000 | 30.0 | 32.1 | 4.5 | 1.3 | 1.6 | 14.2 | 16.3 | 2.1 |

=== Victory likelihood ===
The table below lists opinion polling on the perceived likelihood of victory for each party in the event of a municipal election taking place.

| Polling firm/Commissioner | Fieldwork date | Sample size | PP | PSOE–A | IULV | PA | Other/ None | Question | Lead |
|---|---|---|---|---|---|---|---|---|---|
| CIS | 17 Mar–17 Apr 2011 | 1,000 | 43.1 | 25.5 | 0.3 | 0.2 | 0.6 | 30.3 | 17.6 |

=== Preferred Mayor ===
The table below lists opinion polling on leader preferences to become mayor of Seville.

All candidates

| Polling firm/Commissioner | Fieldwork date | Sample size | | | | | Other/ None/ Not care | Question | Lead |
| Polling firm/Commissioner | Fieldwork date | Sample size | Zoido PP | Espadas PSOE–A | Rodrigo IULV | Ceballos UPyD | Other/ None/ Not care | Question | Lead |
|---|---|---|---|---|---|---|---|---|---|
| CIS | 17 Mar–17 Apr 2011 | 1,000 | 23.4 | 15.2 | 3.3 | 2.4 | 10.4 | 45.3 | 8.2 |

Zoido vs. Espadas

| Polling firm/Commissioner | Fieldwork date | Sample size | | | Other/ None/ Not care | Question | Lead |
| Polling firm/Commissioner | Fieldwork date | Sample size | Zoido PP | Espadas PSOE–A | Other/ None/ Not care | Question | Lead |
|---|---|---|---|---|---|---|---|
| GAD/COPE | 2 May 2011 | ? | 42.0 | 30.0 | 28.0 | | 12.0 |

== Results ==
← Summary of the 22 May 2011 City Council of Seville election results →
| Parties and alliances | Popular vote | | | Seats | |
| Parties and alliances | Votes | % | ±pp | Total | +/− |
|---|---|---|---|---|---|
| People's Party (PP) | 166,040 | 49.31 | +7.47 | 20 | +5 |
| Spanish Socialist Workers' Party of Andalusia (PSOE–A) | 99,168 | 29.45 | −11.01 | 11 | −4 |
| United Left/The Greens–Assembly for Andalusia (IULV–CA) | 24,066 | 7.15 | −1.22 | 2 | −1 |
| Andalusian Party–Andalusian Plural Space (PA–EPAnd)^{1} | 16,097 | 4.78 | −0.43 | 0 | ±0 |
| Union, Progress and Democracy (UPyD) | 10,945 | 3.25 | New | 0 | ±0 |
| The Greens–Ecological Andalusia (LV–AE) | 4,063 | 1.21 | +0.17 | 0 | ±0 |
| Citizens for Blank Votes (CenB) | 2,062 | 0.61 | New | 0 | ±0 |
| Anti-Bullfighting Party Against Mistreatment of Animals (PACMA) | 1,398 | 0.42 | +0.18 | 0 | ±0 |
| For a Fairer World (PUM+J) | 1,051 | 0.31 | +0.14 | 0 | ±0 |
| Humanist Party (PH) | 412 | 0.12 | +0.05 | 0 | ±0 |
| Group of Independent Citizens (GCI) | 406 | 0.12 | −0.05 | 0 | ±0 |
| Free and Efficient Election (ele) | 339 | 0.10 | New | 0 | ±0 |
| Democratic Majority (MD) | 326 | 0.10 | New | 0 | ±0 |
| Internationalist Solidarity and Self-Management (SAIn) | 300 | 0.09 | −0.08 | 0 | ±0 |
| Spanish Phalanx of the CNSO (FE de las JONS) | 258 | 0.08 | −0.01 | 0 | ±0 |
| National Democracy (DN) | 237 | 0.07 | New | 0 | ±0 |
| Andalusian Popular Unity (UPAN) | 204 | 0.06 | New | 0 | ±0 |
| Blank ballots | 9,346 | 2.78 | +0.79 | | |
| Total | 336,718 | | | 33 | ±0 |
| Valid votes | 336,718 | 98.14 | −1.47 | | |
| Invalid votes | 6,380 | 1.86 | +1.47 | | |
| Votes cast / turnout | 343,098 | 62.73 | +8.12 | | |
| Abstentions | 203,846 | 37.27 | −8.12 | | |
| Registered voters | 546,944 | | | | |
Sources
Footnotes: ^{1} Andalusian Party–Andalusian Plural Space results are compared to the combined totals of Andalusian Party and Socialist Party of Andalusia in the 2007 election.

Popular vote
| PP | 49.31% |
| PSOE–A | 29.45% |
| IULV–CA | 7.15% |
| PA–EPAnd | 4.78% |
| UPyD | 3.25% |
| LV–AE | 1.21% |
| Others | 2.08% |
| Blank ballots | 2.78% |

Seats
| PP | 60.61% |
| PSOE–A | 33.33% |
| IULV–CA | 6.06% |

== Aftermath ==
=== Government formation ===
Investiture
| Ballot → | 11 June 2011 | |
| Required majority → | 17 out of 33 | |
| Juan Ignacio Zoido (PP): • PP (20) | 20 / 33 | check |
| Juan Espadas (PSOE–A): • PSOE–A (11) | 11 / 33 | X mark |
| Antonio Rodrigo (IULV–CA): • IULV–CA (2) | 2 / 33 | X mark |
| Abstentions/Blank ballots | 0 / 33 | |
| Absentees | 0 / 33 | |

== Bibliography ==
- Constitución Española (Constitution). Official State Gazette (in Spanish). 27 December 1978 [version as of 28 August 1992]. BOE-A-1978-31229.
- Ley 7/1985, de 2 de abril, Reguladora de las Bases del Régimen Local (Law 7/1985). Official State Gazette (in Spanish). 2 April 1985 [version as of 5 March 2011]. BOE-A-1985-5392.
- Ley Orgánica 5/1985, de 19 de junio, del Régimen Electoral General (Organic Law 5/1985). Official State Gazette (in Spanish). 19 June 1985 [version as of 30 April 2011]. BOE-A-1985-11672.
- Real Decreto 424/2011, de 28 de marzo, por el que se convocan elecciones locales y a las Asambleas de Ceuta y Melilla para el 22 de mayo de 2011 (Royal Decree 424/2011). Official State Gazette (in Spanish). 28 March 2011. BOE-A-2011-5608.
