= 2019 Seville municipal election =

Election in the Spanish municipality of Seville

- 26 May 2019

All 31 seats in the City Council of Seville 16 seats needed for a majority
- Opinion polls
- Registered: 540,851 ▼0.8%
- Turnout: 317,843 (58.8%) ▼0.7 pp
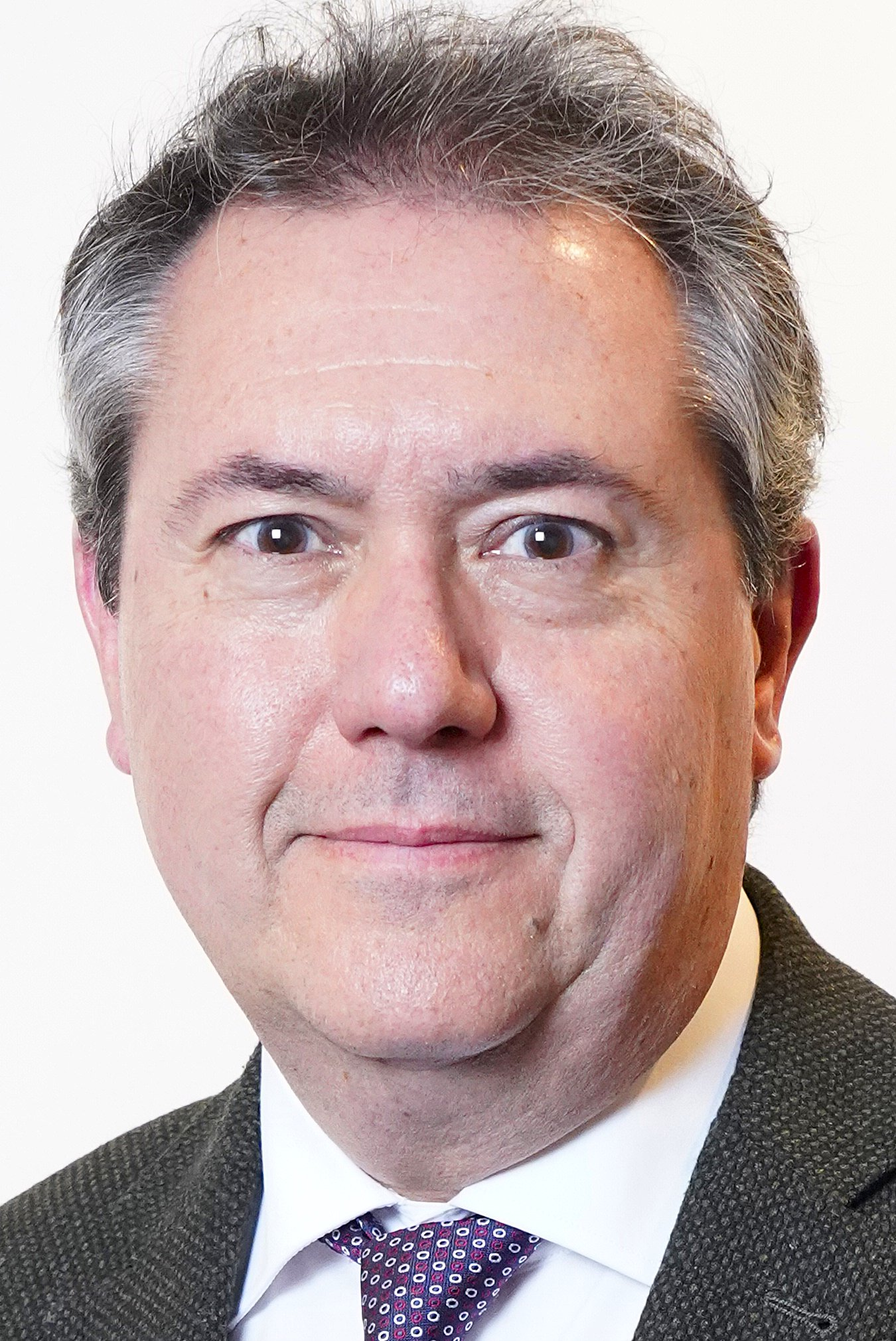

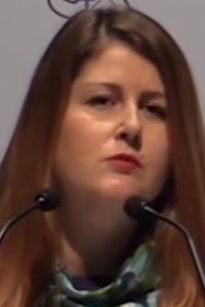

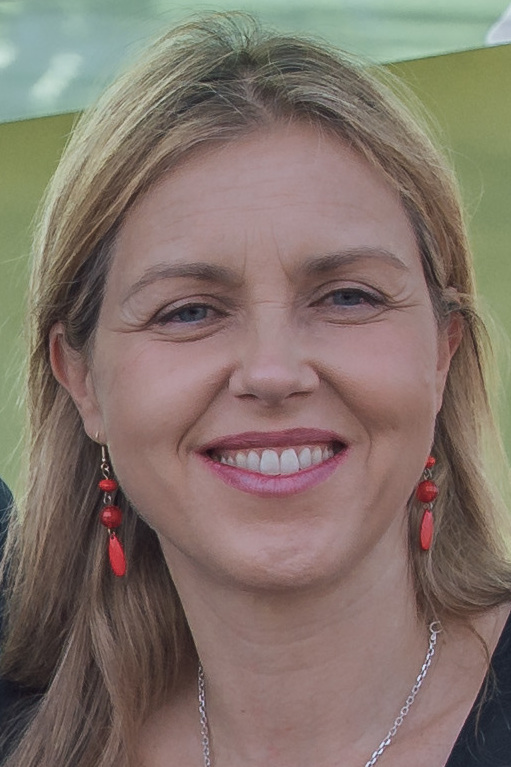
	First party	Second party	Third party
Leader	Juan Espadas	Beltrán Pérez	Susana Serrano
Party	PSOE–A	PP	Adelante
Leader since	24 May 2010	16 March 2018	14 April 2015
Last election	11 seats, 32.2%	12 seats, 33.1%	5 seats, 16.0% (Note: Results for Participa Sevilla (9.0%, 3 seats), IULV–CA (6.0%, 2 seats) and Equo (1.0%, 0 seats) in the 2015 election.)
Seats won	13	8	4
Seat change	▲2	▼4	▼1
Popular vote	123,933	73,101	44,546
Percentage	39.2%	23.1%	14.1%
Swing	▲7.0 pp	▼10.0 pp	▼1.9 pp
	Fourth party	Fifth party
Leader	Álvaro Pimentel	Cristina Peláez
Party	Cs	Vox
Leader since	27 March 2019	2015
Last election	3 seats, 9.3%	0 seats, 0.5%
Seats won	4	2
Seat change	▲1	▲2
Popular vote	39,331	25,122
Percentage	12.5%	8.0%
Swing	▲3.2 pp	▲7.5 pp
Mayor before election
Juan Espadas
PSOE
Mayor after election
Juan Espadas
PSOE

A municipal election was held in Seville on 26 May 2019 to elect the 11th City Council of the municipality. All 31 seats in the City Council were up for election. It was held concurrently with regional elections in twelve autonomous communities and local elections all across Spain, as well as the 2019 European Parliament election.

== Overview ==
Under the 1978 Constitution, the governance of municipalities in Spain—part of the country's local government system—was centered on the figure of city councils (Spanish: ayuntamientos), local corporations with independent legal personality composed of a mayor, a government council and an elected legislative assembly. The mayor was indirectly elected by the local assembly, requiring an absolute majority; otherwise, the candidate from the most-voted party automatically became mayor (ties were resolved by drawing lots). In the case of Seville, the top-tier administrative and governing body was the City Council of Seville.

=== Date ===
The term of local assemblies in Spain expired four years after the date of their previous election, with election day being fixed for the fourth Sunday of May every four years. The election decree was required to be issued no later than 54 days before the scheduled election date and published on the following day in the Official State Gazette (BOE). The previous local elections were held on 24 May 2015, setting the date for election day on the fourth Sunday of May four years later, which was 26 May 2019.

Local assemblies could not be dissolved before the expiration of their term, except in cases of mismanagement that seriously harmed the public interest and implied a breach of constitutional obligations, in which case the Council of Ministers could—optionally—decide to call a by-election.

Elections to the assemblies of local entities were officially called on 2 April 2019 with the publication of the corresponding decree in the BOE, setting election day for 26 May.

=== Electoral system ===
Voting for local assemblies was based on universal suffrage, comprising all Spanish nationals over 18 years of age, registered and residing in the municipality and with full political rights (provided that they had not been deprived of the right to vote by a final sentence), (Note: Amendments in 2018 granted the right to vote to those legally incapacitated.) as well as resident non-national European citizens, and those whose country of origin allowed reciprocal voting by virtue of a treaty.

Local councillors were elected using the D'Hondt method and closed-list proportional voting, with a five percent-threshold of valid votes (including blank ballots) in each municipality. Each municipality was a multi-member constituency, with a number of seats based on the following scale:

Population	Councillors
<100	3
101–250	5
251–1,000	7
1,001–2,000	9
2,001–5,000	11
5,001–10,000	13
10,001–20,000	17
20,001–50,000	21
50,001–100,000	25
>100,001	+1 per each 100,000 inhabitants or fraction +1 if total is an even number

The law did not provide for by-elections to fill vacant seats; instead, any vacancies arising after the proclamation of candidates and during the legislative term were filled by the next candidates on the party lists or, when required, by designated substitutes.

== Parties and candidates ==
The electoral law allowed for parties and federations registered in the interior ministry, alliances and groupings of electors to present lists of candidates. Parties and federations intending to form an alliance were required to inform the relevant electoral commission within 10 days of the election call, whereas groupings of electors needed to secure the signature of a determined amount of the electors registered in the municipality for which they sought election, disallowing electors from signing for more than one list. In the case of Seville, as its population was between 300,001 and 1,000,000, at least 5,000 signatures were required. Additionally, a balanced composition of men and women was required in the electoral lists, so that candidates of either sex made up at least 40 percent of the total composition.

Below is a list of the main parties and alliances which contested the election:

Candidacy	Parties and alliances	Leading candidate	Ideology	Previous result		Gov.	Ref.
Candidacy	Parties and alliances	Leading candidate	Ideology	Vote %	Seats	Gov.	Ref.
PP	List: People's Party (PP)	Beltrán Pérez	Conservatism; Christian democracy	33.1%	12	No	
PSOE–A	List: Spanish Socialist Workers' Party of Andalusia (PSOE–A)	Juan Espadas	Social democracy	32.2%	11	Yes	
Adelante	List: We Can (Podemos); United Left/The Greens–Assembly for Andalusia (IULV–CA) – Communist Party of Andalusia (PCA) – The Dawn. Marxist Organization OM (La Aurora (om)) – Republican Left (IR) – Feminist Party of Spain (PFE); Andalusian Spring (Primavera Andaluza)	Susana Serrano	Andalusian nationalism Left-wing populism Direct democracy	16.0%	5	No	
Cs	List: Citizens–Party of the Citizenry (Cs)	Álvaro Pimentel	Liberalism	9.3%	3	No	
Vox	List: Vox (Vox)	Cristina Peláez	Right-wing populism Ultranationalism; National conservatism	0.5%	0	No	

== Opinion polls ==
The tables below list opinion polling results in reverse chronological order, showing the most recent first and using the dates when the survey fieldwork was done, as opposed to the date of publication. Where the fieldwork dates are unknown, the date of publication is given instead. The highest percentage figure in each polling survey is displayed with its background shaded in the leading party's colour. If a tie ensues, this is applied to the figures with the highest percentages. The "Lead" column on the right shows the percentage-point difference between the parties with the highest percentages in a poll.

=== Voting intention estimates ===
The table below lists weighted voting intention estimates. Refusals are generally excluded from the party vote percentages, while question wording and the treatment of "don't know" responses and those not intending to vote may vary between polling organisations. When available, seat projections determined by the polling organisations are displayed below (or in place of) the percentages in a smaller font; 16 seats were required for an absolute majority in the City Council of Seville.

Polling firm/Commissioner	Fieldwork date	Sample size	Turnout	PP	PSOE–A	Cs	Participa Sevilla	IULV	Vox	Adelante	Lead
2019 municipal election	26 May 2019	—N/a	58.8	23.1; 8	39.2; 13	12.5; 4	(Note: Within Adelante.)		8.0; 2	14.1; 4	16.1
KeyData/Público	19 May 2019	?	70.5	17.8; 6	32.4; 11	16.5; 6			10.6; 3	15.9; 5	14.6
Dataestudios/ABC	13–16 May 2019	600	?	22.2; 7/8	38.1; 12/13	14.1; 4/5			5.8; 1/2	16.2; 5/6	15.9
Sigma Dos/El Mundo	13–15 May 2019	400	?	22.2; 7	37.1; 12/13	14.1; 4/5			7.2; 2	16.8; 5	14.9
40dB/El País	3–8 May 2019	800	?	22.0; 7	36.6; 12/13	14.5; 4/5			7.7; 2	15.4; 5	14.6
April 2019 general election	28 Apr 2019	—N/a	76.4	17.7 (6)	32.7 (11)	16.9 (5)			13.0 (4)	16.3 (5)	15.0
CIS	21 Mar–23 Apr 2019	497	?	25.2; 8/10	42.3; 13/15	10.8; 3/4			2.9; 0	15.7; 5/6	17.1
ElectoPanel/Electomanía	31 Mar–7 Apr 2019	?	?	21.4; 7	31.2; 10	14.7; 5			10.6; 3	17.8; 6	9.8
SW Demoscopia/Grupo Viva	1–5 Apr 2019	1,002	?	? 8	? 13	? 4			? 2	? 4	?
ElectoPanel/Electomanía	24–31 Mar 2019	?	?	20.0; 7	30.9; 10	15.4; 5			11.0; 3	18.4; 6	10.9
ElectoPanel/Electomanía	17–24 Mar 2019	?	?	19.9; 7	31.0; 10	15.5; 5			11.1; 3	18.4; 6	11.1
ElectoPanel/Electomanía	10–17 Mar 2019	?	?	20.1; 6	29.5; 10	14.8; 5			13.2; 4	19.0; 6	9.4
ElectoPanel/Electomanía	3–10 Mar 2019	?	?	19.7; 6	29.0; 10	15.5; 5			13.1; 4	19.3; 6	9.3
ElectoPanel/Electomanía	22 Feb–3 Mar 2019	?	?	18.0; 6	28.6; 10	16.6; 6	13.1; 5	4.3; 0	12.9; 4	–	10.6
Dialoga Consultores	25 Feb–1 Mar 2019	2,200	?	27.2; 9/10	34.5; 11/12	12.2; 3/4			8.8; 2/3	13.9; 4/5	7.3
Dataestudios/ABC	11–17 Dec 2018	?	?	17.9; 6	30.6; 10/11	18.7; 6			9.4; 3	17.6; 5/6	11.9
2018 regional election	2 Dec 2018	—N/a	63.1	18.8 (6)	25.2 (9)	18.8 (6)			12.4 (4)	18.9 (6)	6.3
Dataestudios/ABC	12–18 Jun 2018	606	?	18.3; 6	40.4; 14	20.6; 7	(Note: Within Unidos Podemos.)		–	11.7; 4	19.8
Dataestudios/ABC	1–7 Feb 2018	600	?	21.6; 7/8	35.5; 12/13	22.2; 7/8	9.4; 3	5.2; 0/1	–	–	13.3
SW Demoscopia/Grupo Viva	9–15 Jun 2017	705	?	28.0; 9	33.5; 11	14.3; 5	12.0; 4	6.3; 2	–	–	5.5
2016 general election	26 Jun 2016	—N/a	71.1	34.0 (11)	28.0 (9)	13.7 (4)			0.3 (0)	20.9 (7)	6.0
2015 general election	20 Dec 2015	—N/a	74.0	30.3 (10)	27.4 (9)	13.9 (5)	20.4 (7)	4.8 (0)	0.4 (0)	–	2.9
2015 municipal election	24 May 2015	—N/a	59.5	33.1; 12	32.2; 11	9.3; 3	9.0; 3	6.0; 2	0.5; 0	–	0.9

=== Voting preferences ===
The table below lists raw, unweighted voting preferences.

Polling firm/Commissioner	Fieldwork date	Sample size	PP	PSOE–A	Cs	Participa Sevilla	IULV	Vox	Adelante	Question	X mark	Lead
2019 municipal election	26 May 2019	—N/a	13.5	22.9	7.3			4.6	8.2	—N/a	41.2	9.4
Dataestudios/ABC	13–16 May 2019	600	18.2	28.8	–			–	10.2	–	–	10.6
April 2019 general election (Note: Does not include non-resident citizens.)	28 Apr 2019	—N/a	13.4	24.8	12.8			9.8	12.3	—N/a	23.6	11.4
CIS	21 Mar–23 Apr 2019	497	12.7	23.7	6.2			1.6	8.7	36.0	9.3	11.0
SW Demoscopia/Grupo Viva	1–5 Apr 2019	1,002	16.7	30.2	6.4			3.7	5.3	–	–	13.5
Dialoga Consultores	25 Feb–1 Mar 2019	2,200	13.1	25.0	7.1			5.5	10.7	23.3	7.7	11.9
2018 regional election	2 Dec 2018	—N/a	11.6	15.7	11.7			7.7	11.7	—N/a	36.9	4.0
2016 general election	26 Jun 2016	—N/a	24.0	19.8	9.7			0.2	14.7	—N/a	28.9	4.2
2015 general election	20 Dec 2015	—N/a	22.2	20.2	10.2	15.0	3.6	0.3	–	—N/a	26.0	2.0
2015 municipal election	24 May 2015	—N/a	19.5	19.0	5.5	5.3	3.5	0.3	–	—N/a	40.5	0.5

=== Victory likelihood ===
The table below lists opinion polling on the perceived likelihood of victory for each party in the event of a municipal election taking place.

Polling firm/Commissioner	Fieldwork date	Sample size	PP	PSOE–A	Other/ None	Question	Lead
Dataestudios/ABC	13–16 May 2019	600	11.2	52.7	36.1		41.5

=== Preferred Mayor ===
The table below lists opinion polling on leader preferences to become mayor of Seville.

Polling firm/Commissioner	Fieldwork date	Sample size										Other/ None/ Not care	Question	Lead
Polling firm/Commissioner	Fieldwork date	Sample size	Zoido PP	Díaz PP	Pérez PP	Espadas PSOE–A	Millán Cs	Rojas IULV	Serrano Adelante	Honorato Adelante	Moreno Adelante	Other/ None/ Not care	Question	Lead
SW Demoscopia/Grupo Viva	1–5 Apr 2019	1,002	–	–	19.0	48.2	–	–	–	–	–	32.8	–	29.2
Dialoga Consultores	25 Feb–1 Mar 2019	2,200	–	–	12.0	22.4	–	2.5	5.3	–	–	57.9	–	10.4
Dataestudios/ABC	11–17 Dec 2018	?	–	–	15.7	23.0	17.2	–	–	–	–	–	–	5.8
SW Demoscopia/Grupo Viva	9–15 Jun 2017	705	19.8	5.2	2.2	25.9	10.9	7.5	2.4	2.7	5.2	18.2		6.1

== Results ==
← Summary of the 26 May 2019 City Council of Seville election results →
Parties and alliances	Popular vote			Seats	
Parties and alliances	Votes	%	±pp	Total	+/−
Spanish Socialist Workers' Party of Andalusia (PSOE–A)	123,933	39.24	+7.08	13	+2
People's Party (PP)	73,101	23.15	−9.90	8	−4
Forward Seville: We Can–United Left–Andalusian Spring (Adelante)^{1}	44,546	14.10	−1.92	4	−1
Citizens–Party of the Citizenry (Cs)	39,331	12.45	+3.16	4	+1
Vox (Vox)	25,122	7.95	+7.49	2	+2
Animalist Party Against Mistreatment of Animals (PACMA)	3,521	1.11	+0.09	0	±0
Andalusia by Herself (AxSí)^{2}	1,083	0.34	−1.07	0	±0
More With You (CNTG+)	820	0.26	New	0	±0
Act (PACT)	736	0.23	New	0	±0
For a Fairer World (PUM+J)	486	0.15	New	0	±0
Feminist Initiative (IFem)	392	0.12	New	0	±0
Advancing For You (Avanzamos)	206	0.07	New	0	±0
Spanish Phalanx of the CNSO (FE de las JONS)	118	0.04	−0.06	0	±0
Party of the Immigrant in Spain (PADIE)	103	0.03	−0.03	0	±0
Renaissance and Union of Europe Party (PRUNE)	47	0.01	New	0	±0
Blank ballots	2,281	0.72	−0.41		
Total	315,826			31	±0
Valid votes	315,826	99.37	+0.15		
Invalid votes	2,017	0.63	−0.15		
Votes cast / turnout	317,843	58.77	−0.69		
Abstentions	223,008	41.23	+0.69		
Registered voters	540,851				
Sources
Footnotes: ^{1} Forward Seville: We Can–United Left–Andalusian Spring results are compared to the combined totals of Participate Seville, United Left/The Greens–Assembly for Andalusia and Equo in the 2015 election.; ^{2} Andalusia by Herself results are compared to Andalusian Party totals in the 2015 election.

Popular vote
PSOE–A	39.24%
PP	23.15%
Adelante	14.10%
Cs	12.45%
Vox	7.95%
PACMA	1.11%
Others	1.26%
Blank ballots	0.72%

Seats
PSOE–A	41.94%
PP	25.81%
Adelante	12.90%
Cs	12.90%
Vox	6.45%

== Aftermath ==
=== Government formation ===
Investiture
Ballot →	15 June 2019	
Required majority →	16 out of 31	
Juan Espadas (PSOE–A): • PSOE–A (13)	13 / 31	check
Beltrán Pérez (PP): • PP (8)	8 / 31	X mark
Susana Serrano (Adelante): • Adelante (4)	4 / 31	X mark
Álvaro Pimentel (Cs): • Cs (4)	4 / 31	X mark
Cristina Peláez (Vox): • Vox (2)	2 / 31	X mark
Abstentions/Blank ballots	0 / 31	
Absentees	0 / 31	

=== 2022 investiture ===
Investiture
Ballot →	3 January 2022	
Required majority →	16 out of 31	
Antonio Muñoz (PSOE–A): • PSOE–A (13)	13 / 31	check
Juan de la Rosa (PP): • PP (8)	8 / 31	X mark
Álvaro Pimentel (Cs): • Cs (4)	4 / 31	X mark
Susana Serrano (Adelante): • Adelante (3)	3 / 31	X mark
Cristina Peláez (Vox): • Vox (2)	2 / 31	X mark
Abstentions/Blank ballots: • INDEP (1)	1 / 31	
Absentees	0 / 31	

== Bibliography ==
- Constitución Española (Constitution). Official State Gazette (in Spanish). 27 December 1978 [version as of 27 September 2011]. BOE-A-1978-31229.
- Ley 7/1985, de 2 de abril, Reguladora de las Bases del Régimen Local (Law 7/1985). Official State Gazette (in Spanish). 2 April 1985 [version as of 4 August 2018]. BOE-A-1985-5392.
- Ley Orgánica 5/1985, de 19 de junio, del Régimen Electoral General (Organic Law 5/1985). Official State Gazette (in Spanish). 19 June 1985 [version as of 6 March 2019]. BOE-A-1985-11672.
- Real Decreto 209/2019, de 1 de abril, por el que se convocan elecciones locales y a las Asambleas de Ceuta y Melilla para el 26 de mayo de 2019 (Royal Decree 209/2019). Official State Gazette (in Spanish). 1 April 2019. BOE-A-2019-4824.
