= Cristina Peláez =

Spanish politician (born 1972)

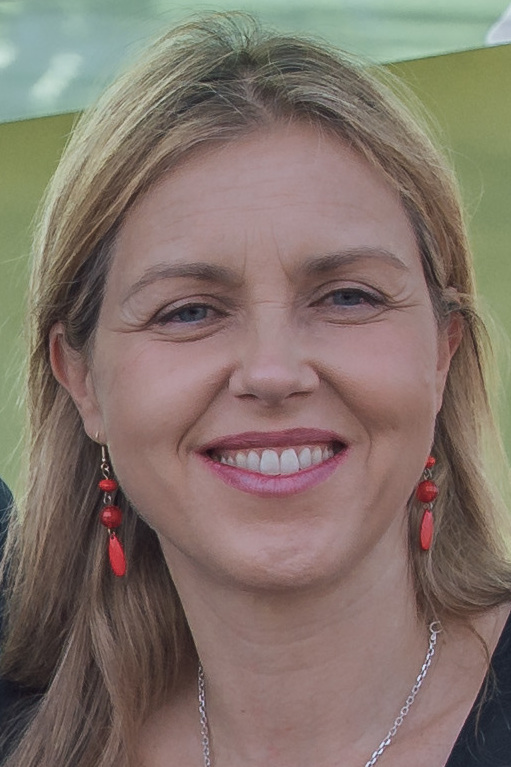
Peláez in 2023

María Cristina Peláez Izquierdo (born 1972) is a Spanish politician of the party Vox. An early member of the party, she led it in its first election to the City Council of Seville in 2015. She led it again in 2019 and 2023, both times being elected. She resigned her council seat when she was elected to the Parliament of Andalusia in 2026.

== Early and personal life ==
Born in Seville, Peláez was educated at a Christian school in the southern neighbourhood of Heliópolis. She spent her Spanish Baccalaureate years in Córdoba, where her father had moved the family due to his position as a professor of international law. She returned to her hometown for a University of Seville degree in psychology and a master's degree in human resources, graduating in 1997. She worked in the private sector for over two decades, including in Belgium and Luxembourg. As of 2023, she is married and has three children, of whom the eldest are twins.

== Political career ==
=== Seville City Council ===
Peláez was one of the first five members of Vox in Seville, having seen an early television debate featuring founder Santiago Abascal. She joined in January 2014, as its 663rd member overall. She was on their lists in the 2014 European Parliament election in Spain, the 2015 Seville City Council election, the 2016 Spanish general election (Senate), and elections to the Parliament of Andalusia in 2015 and 2018.

Peláez was once again the Vox candidate for mayor in the 2019 Seville City Council election. The party's votes grew from 1,500 to 25,000, entering the city council with two seats.

In the 2023 Seville City Council election, Vox grew from two to three seats on the council, becoming the third-largest party. The result ended eight years of Spanish Socialist Workers' Party (PSOE) rule, with José Luis Sanz of the People's Party (PP) becoming mayor in a minority government of 14 of 31 seats. Peláez did not give support to Sanz's proposed budgets.

In May 2024, Peláez held talks with Sanz, which the PP denied were negotiations on a coalition. The following month, a motion of confidence in Sanz failed when it was rejected by all other parties in the city council, mainly Vox and the PSOE of Antonio Muñoz.

=== Parliament of Andalusia ===
In the 2026 Andalusian regional election, Peláez was second on Vox's list in the Seville constituency; she was one of two Seville councillors contesting the election. After being elected to the Parliament of Andalusia, and though legally permitted to hold both offices simultaneously, she resigned her council seat on 25 June. The PP remained the largest party in parliament but required Vox's support in order to govern. Part of the condition of the coalition agreement was for Peláez to become vice president of the Parliament of Andalusia, with the presidency being the role of speaker.
