= Juan Espadas =

Spanish politician (born 1966)

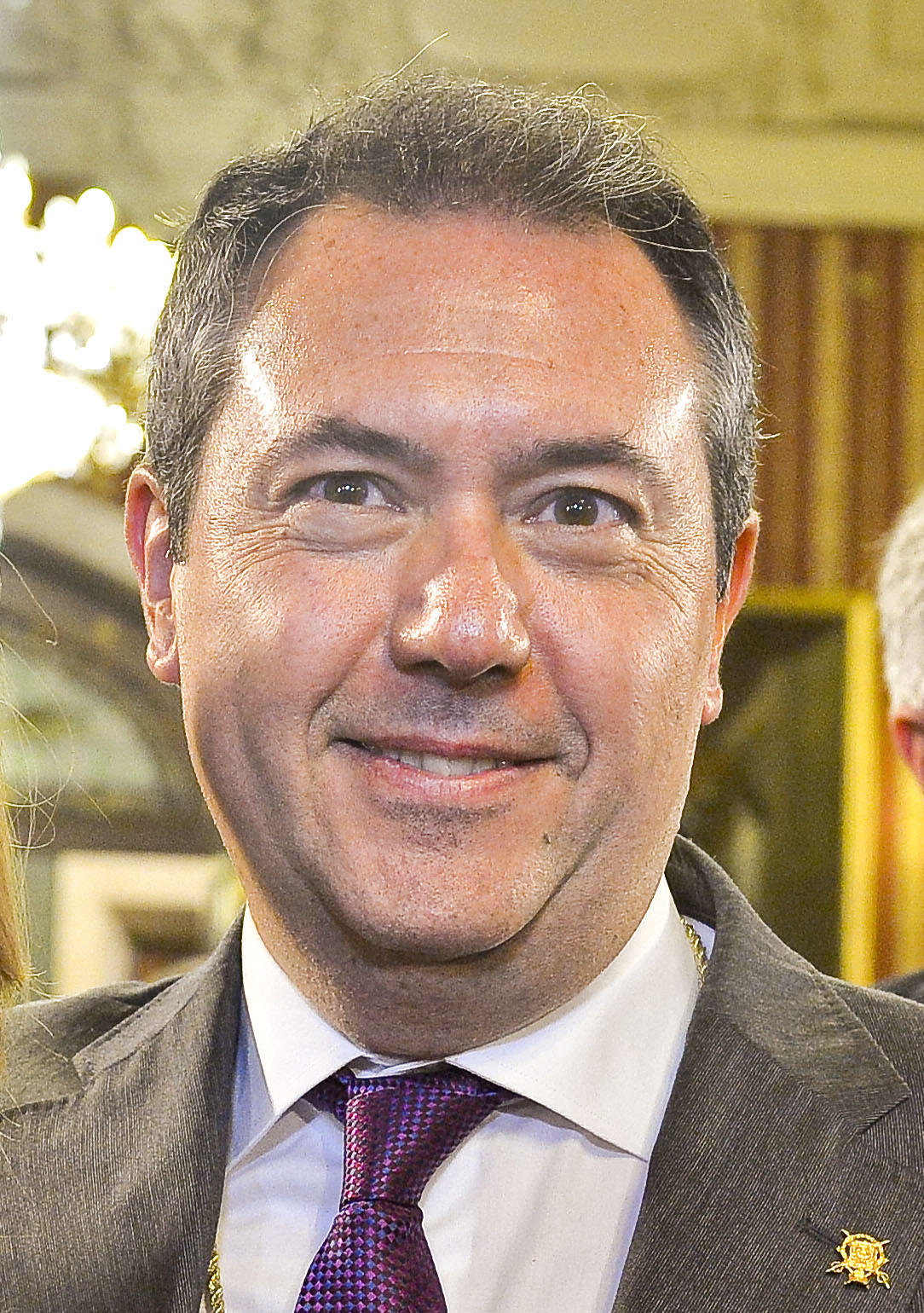
- Espadas in 2015

Secretary-General of the Socialist Workers' Party of Andalusia
- In office 23 July 2021 – 22 February 2025
- Preceded by: Susana Díaz
- Succeeded by: María Jesús Montero

Mayor of Seville
- In office 13 June 2015 – 3 January 2022
- Preceded by: Juan Ignacio Zoido
- Succeeded by: Antonio Muñoz

Councillor of Housing and Planning of Andalusia
- In office 23 April 2008 – 22 March 2010
- President: Manuel Chaves (2008-2009); José Antonio Griñán (2009-2010)
- Preceded by: Luis García Garrido
- Succeeded by: Rosa Aguilar

Member of the Senate
- Incumbent
- Assumed office 21 December 2021
- Constituency: Andalusia
- In office 27 October 2010 – 9 September 2013
- Constituency: Andalusia

Member of the Seville City Council
- In office 11 June 2011 – 3 January 2022

Personal details
- Born: 30 September 1966 (age 60) Seville, Andalusia, Spain
- Party: PSOE-A

Juan Espadas Cejas (born 30 September 1966) is a Spanish politician of the Spanish Socialist Workers' Party (PSOE). He was the Minister of Housing and Planning for the Government of Andalusia from 2008 to 2010 and a senator from 2010 to 2013. From June 2015 to January 2022, he has served as the mayor of Seville. He became his party's Secretary General in Andalusia in July 2021.

== Biography ==
Espadas was born in Seville and grew up in the Miraflores district. When he was 22, he graduated from the University of Seville with degree in Law. He also has a degree in Business Management from the Institute of San Telmo. He is married and has two children.

In 1990 he began to collaborate with the Spanish Socialist Workers' Party (PSOE) as a sympathizer in the Environment sector group and participated in the expert groups for the drafting of the party's program for the regional elections. A year later, he wrote the Manual of the Environment Councillor for the municipal elections of 1991.

In 1997 he joined the PSOE and was appointed Federal Coordinator for the Environment, a responsibility he held until 2009. During this stage he worked with the teams of Joaquín Almunia and José Luis Rodríguez Zapatero coordinating the sectorial policies of the environment and territorial planning.

In 2008 he participated in the laying of the foundation stone for 583 subsidized housing units (VPO), promoted by the Foundation for the Development of Southern Europe.

On 26 March 2010, the 11 PSOE groups of Seville supported Espadas's candidacy for mayor of Seville in the 2011 election. The victory by absolute majority of the People's Party candidate, Juan Ignacio Zoido, placed Espadas as the leader of the main opposition party in the city council for four years. After the 2015 election he became mayor through a pact between the PSOE, United Left and Participa Sevilla. On 15 June 2019, he was re-elected thanks to the 13 votes of the Socialist councillors.

In July 2021, Espadas became the new Secretary General of the PSOE in Andalusia, defeating incumbent Susana Díaz with 55% of the vote. He resigned as mayor and city councillor at the start of 2022 to concentrate on his new role, whereby he would be their lead candidate in the regional election.

Political offices
Preceded by Luis García Garrido	Councillor of Housing and Planning of Andalusia; 2008–2010	Succeeded by Rosa Aguilar
Preceded by Susana Díaz	Mayor of Seville; 2015–2022	Succeeded by Antonio Muñoz
Party political offices
Preceded by Alberto Moriña	Leader of the Socialist Group in the Seville City Council; 2011–2015	Succeeded by Carmen Castreño
Preceded by Susana Díaz	Secretary-General of the Socialist Workers' Party of Andalusia; 2021–present	Succeeded by Incumbent
