= Marta Bosquet =

Spanish politician

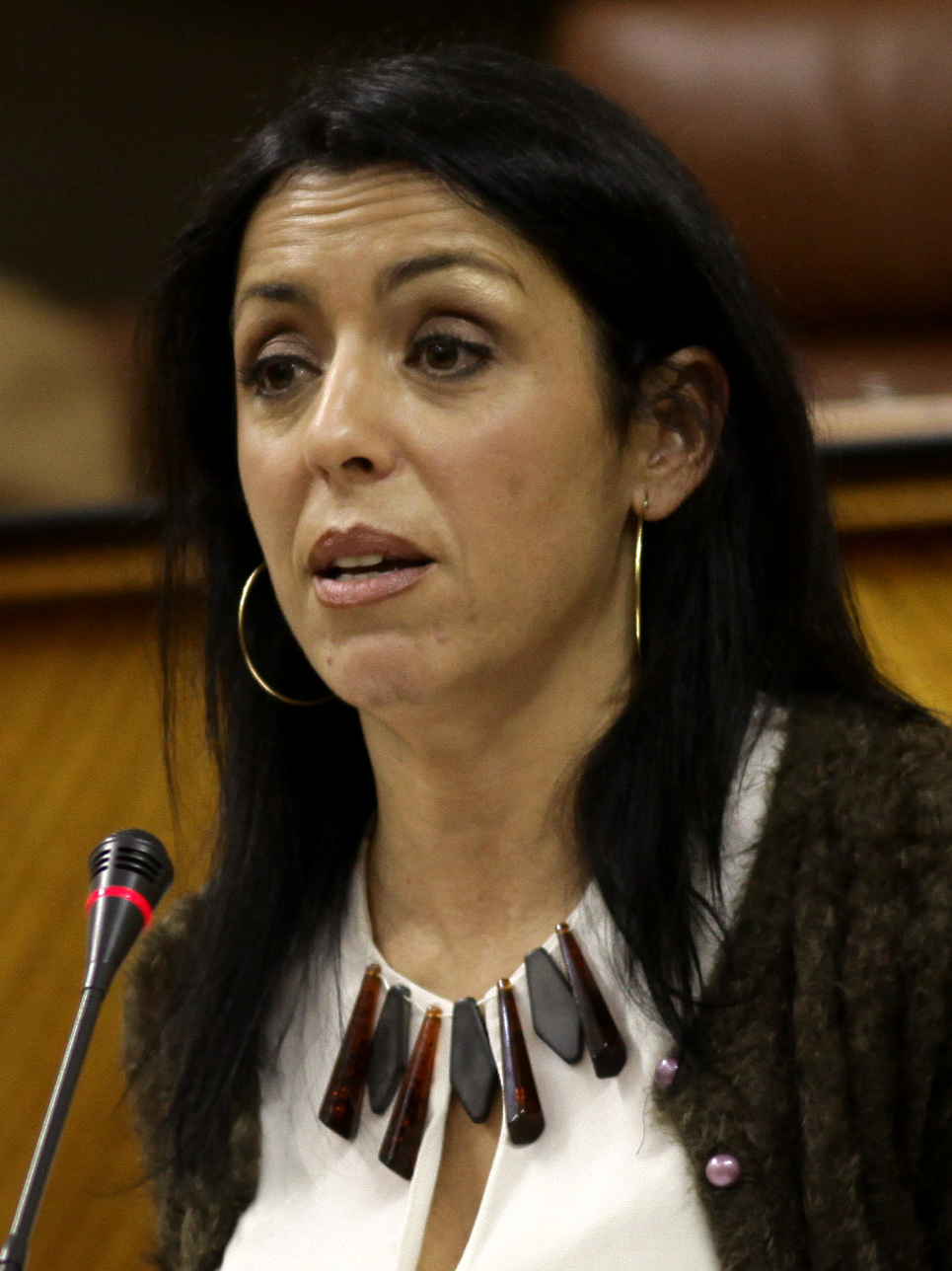
- Bosquet in 2020

President of the Parliament of Andalusia
- In office 27 December 2018 – 14 July 2022
- Vice President: Esperanza Oña
- Preceded by: Juan Pablo Durán
- Succeeded by: Jesús Aguirre

Member of the Parliament of Andalusia
- In office 16 April 2015 – 14 July 2022
- Constituency: Almería

Personal details
- Born: 16 April 1969 (age 57) Almería, Spain
- Party: Citizens
- Education: University of Granada

Marta Bosquet Aznar (born 16 April 1969) is a Spanish politician of the Citizens party. She was a member of the Parliament of Andalusia from 2015 to 2022, serving as its president from 2018.

== Biography ==
Born in Almería, Bosquet graduated in law from the University of Granada in 1994 and worked in a law firm until setting up her own legal advisory office in 1998. She also taught courses on Criminal Law from 1999 to 2000 at the University of Almería. In 2003, she became a legal consultant for the Independent Group for Almería (GIAL) and joined Citizens in December 2013. She was elected to the Parliament of Andalusia in the 2015 election.

After the 2018 election, the People's Party and Citizens formed the first right-of-centre Regional Government of Andalusia, and Bosquet was chosen as President of the Parliament of Andalusia, the position of speaker. She was the first Citizens member to lead any legislature in Spain. She lost her position when Citizens lost all of its seats in the 2022 election.

Bosquet is a flamenco aficionado and the mother of two children.
