= José María González Santos =

Mayor of Cadiz

Kichi
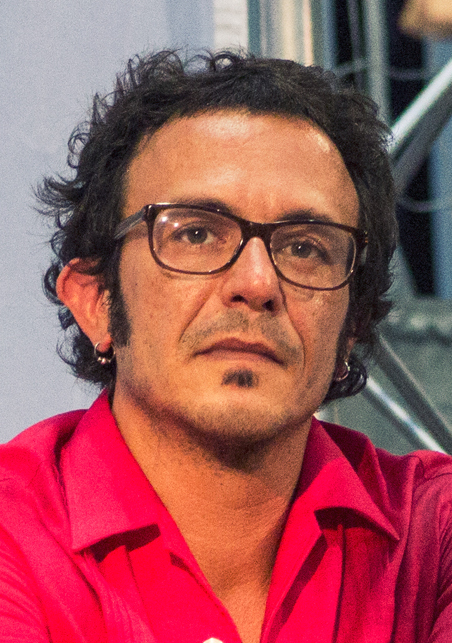

Mayor of Cádiz
- In office 13 June 2015 – 17 June 2023
- Preceded by: Teófila Martínez
- Succeeded by: Bruno García

Personal details
- Born: José María González Santos; 22 September 1975 (age 51) Rotterdam, Netherlands
- Party: Anticapitalistas; Adelante Andalucía
- Domestic partner: Teresa Rodríguez
- Education: University of Cádiz
- Occupation: Highschool teacher, politician, trade unionist, chirigotero

José María González Santos (born 22 September 1975), mononymously known as Kichi, is a Spanish politician and teacher, Mayor of Cádiz from 2015 to 2023.

== Biography ==
Born on 22 September 1975 in Rotterdam, where his parents had immigrated fleeing the dire economic conditions in the Bay of Cádiz. His family returned to Cádiz with Kichi when he was 4 years old. Since the age of 13, Kichi has been involved in the Carnival of Cádiz, first as chirigotero and later as vocalist in the comparsa of Jesús Bienvenido.

After obtaining a licentiate degree in Geography and History from the University of Cádiz (UCA), he became a highschool teacher, working across the Andalusian region as interim until he earned a permanent post. He later became a trade union representative in the 2010s. He has been in a relationship for years with Teresa Rodríguez, with whom he had a daughter in 2019 (Kichi has two children from a previous relationship).

A member of Izquierda Anticapitalista (IZAN), he ran 1st in the list of Cádiz Sí Se Puede (a grouping of electors linked to Podemos) vis-à-vis the May 2015 municipal election in Cádiz. Following the results of the election, in which Por Cádiz Sí Se Puede earned 9 seats, Kichi was invested Mayor on 13 June 2015, with the support from the Por Cádiz Sí Se Puede (9), Spanish Socialist Workers' Party (5) and Ganar Cádiz en Común (2) municipal councillors. He renovated the post of Mayor for a second term, after the 2019 municipal election, in which the list he led neared an absolute majority, with 13 councillors out of 27.
