= List of presidents of the Parliament of Andalusia =

President of the Parliament of Andalusia
- Presidente del Parlamento de Andalucía
- Logo of the Parliament of Andalusia

- Flag of Andalusia

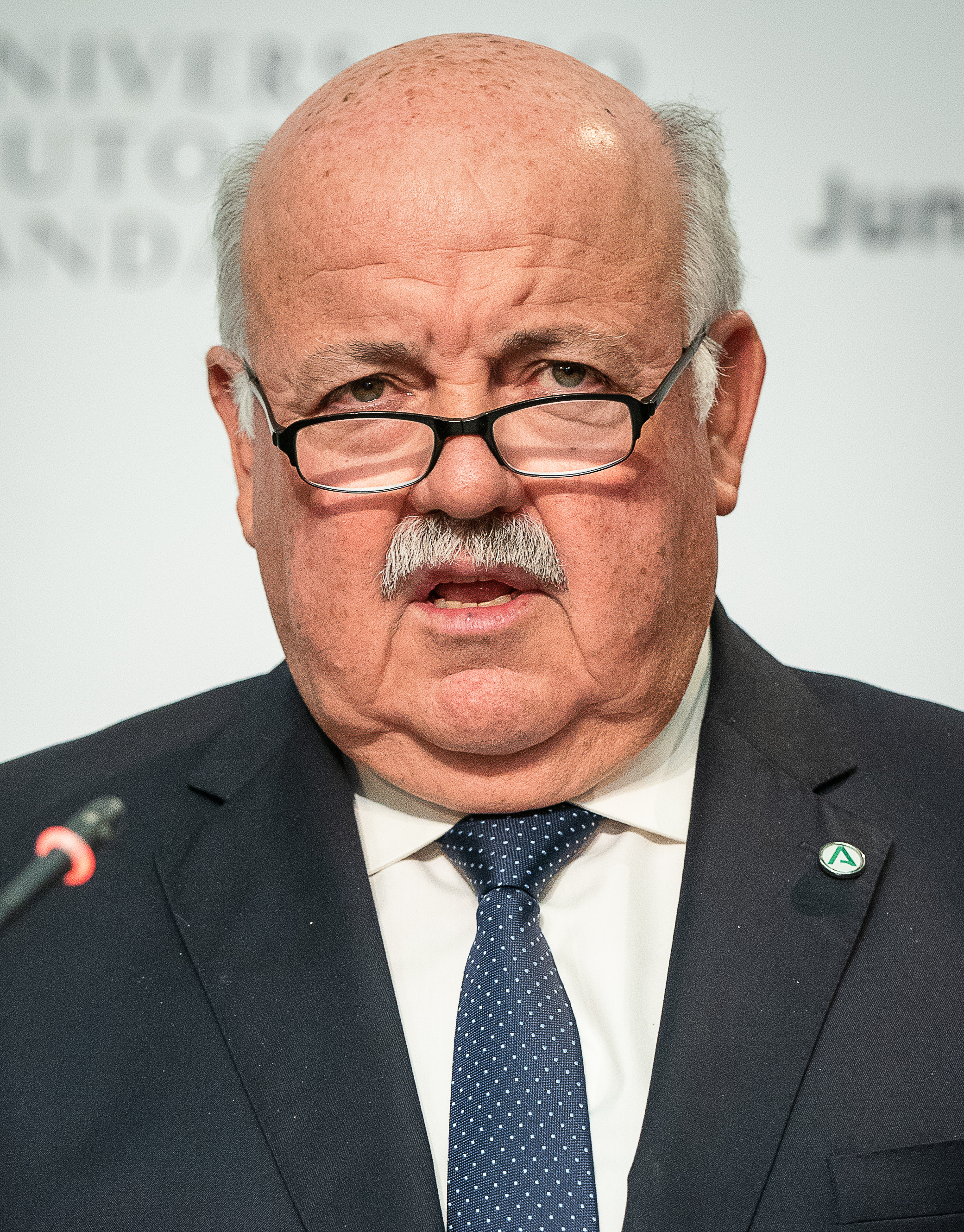
- Incumbent; Jesús Aguirre since 14 July 2022
- Member of: Parliament of Andalusia
- Formation: 21 June 1982
- First holder: Antonio Ojeda
- Website: parlamentodeandalucia.es

This article lists the presidents of the Parliament of Andalusia, the regional legislature of Andalusia.

== Presidents ==
No.	Name	Portrait	Party	Took office	Left office	^{Legs.}	^{Refs.}
1	Antonio Ojeda		Spanish Socialist; Workers' Party of Andalusia	21 June 1982	21 June 1986	1st	
2	Ángel Manuel López		Spanish Socialist; Workers' Party of Andalusia	17 July 1986	26 September 1988	2nd	
3	José Antonio Marín Rite		Spanish Socialist; Workers' Party of Andalusia	27 September 1988	22 June 1990	2nd	
3	José Antonio Marín Rite		Spanish Socialist; Workers' Party of Andalusia	16 July 1990	11 June 1994	3rd	
4	Diego Valderas		United Left/The Greens–Assembly for Andalusia	5 July 1994	2 March 1996	4th	
5	Javier Torres		Spanish Socialist; Workers' Party of Andalusia	29 March 1996	11 March 2000	5th	
5	Javier Torres		Spanish Socialist; Workers' Party of Andalusia	6 April 2000	13 March 2004	6th	
6	Mar Moreno		Spanish Socialist; Workers' Party of Andalusia	31 March 2004	8 March 2008	7th	
7	Fuensanta Coves		Spanish Socialist; Workers' Party of Andalusia	3 April 2008	24 March 2012	8th	
8	Manuel Gracia		Spanish Socialist; Workers' Party of Andalusia	19 April 2012	21 March 2015	9th	
9	Juan Pablo Durán		Spanish Socialist; Workers' Party of Andalusia	16 April 2015	9 October 2018	10th	
10	Marta Bosquet		Citizens	27 December 2018	14 July 2022	11th	
11	Jesús Aguirre		People's Party of Andalusia	14 July 2022		12th	
