= Juan Ignacio Zoido =

Spanish judge and politician

The Most Excellent Juan Ignacio Zoido MEP
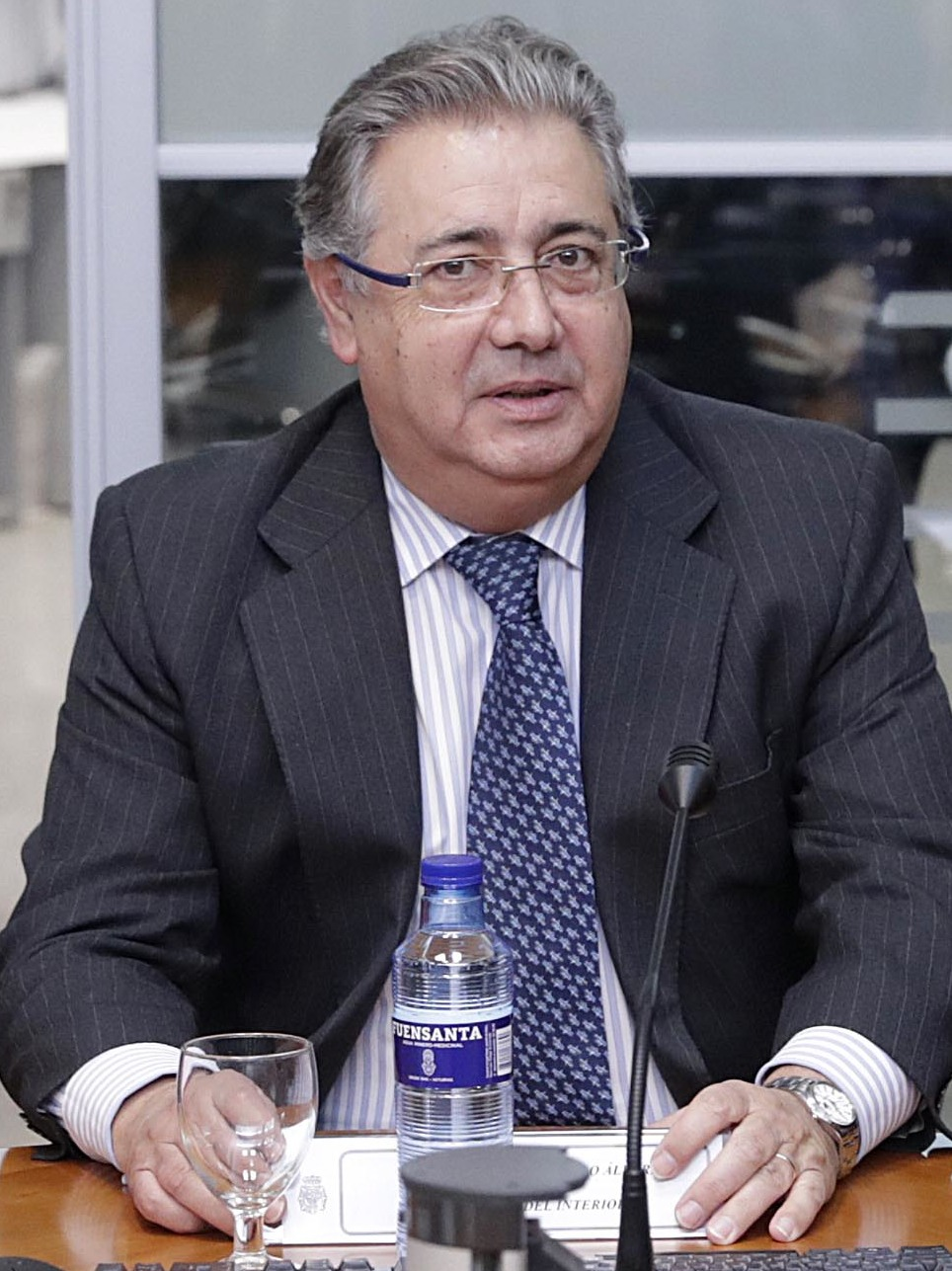
- Zoido in 2016

Member of the European Parliament for Spain
- Incumbent
- Assumed office 3 July 2019

Minister of the Interior
- In office 4 November 2016 – 1 June 2018
- Monarch: Felipe VI
- Prime Minister: Mariano Rajoy
- Preceded by: Jorge Fernández Díaz
- Succeeded by: Fernando Grande-Marlaska

Mayor of Seville
- In office 11 June 2011 – 15 June 2015
- Preceded by: Alfredo Sánchez Monteseirín
- Succeeded by: Juan Espadas

Member of the Congress of Deputies
- In office 13 January 2016 – 21 May 2019
- Constituency: Seville

Personal details
- Born: Juan Ignacio Zoido Álvarez; 21 January 1957 (age 69) Montellano, Seville, Andalusia, Spain
- Party: People's Party (1989–present)
- Education: University of Seville
- Occupation: Judge, Politician

Juan Ignacio Zoido Álvarez (pronounced [xwaniɣ'naθjo 'θojðo]; born 21 January 1957) is a Spanish former judge and politician of the People's Party, who has been serving as Member of the European Parliament since 2019. In Parliament, he has since been serving on the Committee on Agriculture and Rural Development.

Zoido was the Minister of the Interior between November 2016 and June 2018, when a vote of no-confidence against Mariano Rajoy ousted the government. He has previously been Mayor of Seville from 2011 to 2015, Member of the Parliament of Andalusia from 2008 to 2014 and Chairman of the People's Party of Andalusia from 2012 to 2014.

== Early years and education ==
Juan Ignacio Zoido was born in Montellano, Seville, and grew up in Fregenal de la Sierra, where his father owned a bakery. He started his law studies in the University of Almeria and graduated in 1979 in the University of Seville. After completing his studies, Zoido did his military service in Cerro Muriano, serving as a bodyguard for several generals.

== Career in civil service ==
Zoido passed the Judiciary competitive examinations in 1983 and was first posted as First Instance and Inquiry Judge of the Arrecife District in Lanzarote. A year later he was promoted and posted as First Instance and Inquiry Judge in the Utrera district. In 1987 he is promoted to magistrate and posted to San Cristóbal de La Laguna (Tenerife) as titular Judge of the 3rd Court of First Instance and Inquiry of that district. He returned to Andalucía in 1987 being posted a titular judge of the 7th Court of First Instance (family affairs) of Seville, in 1989 he changed his court to the 7th Criminal Court of the same district. In 1992 he is named Dean Juadge of Seville position where he remained until 1996.

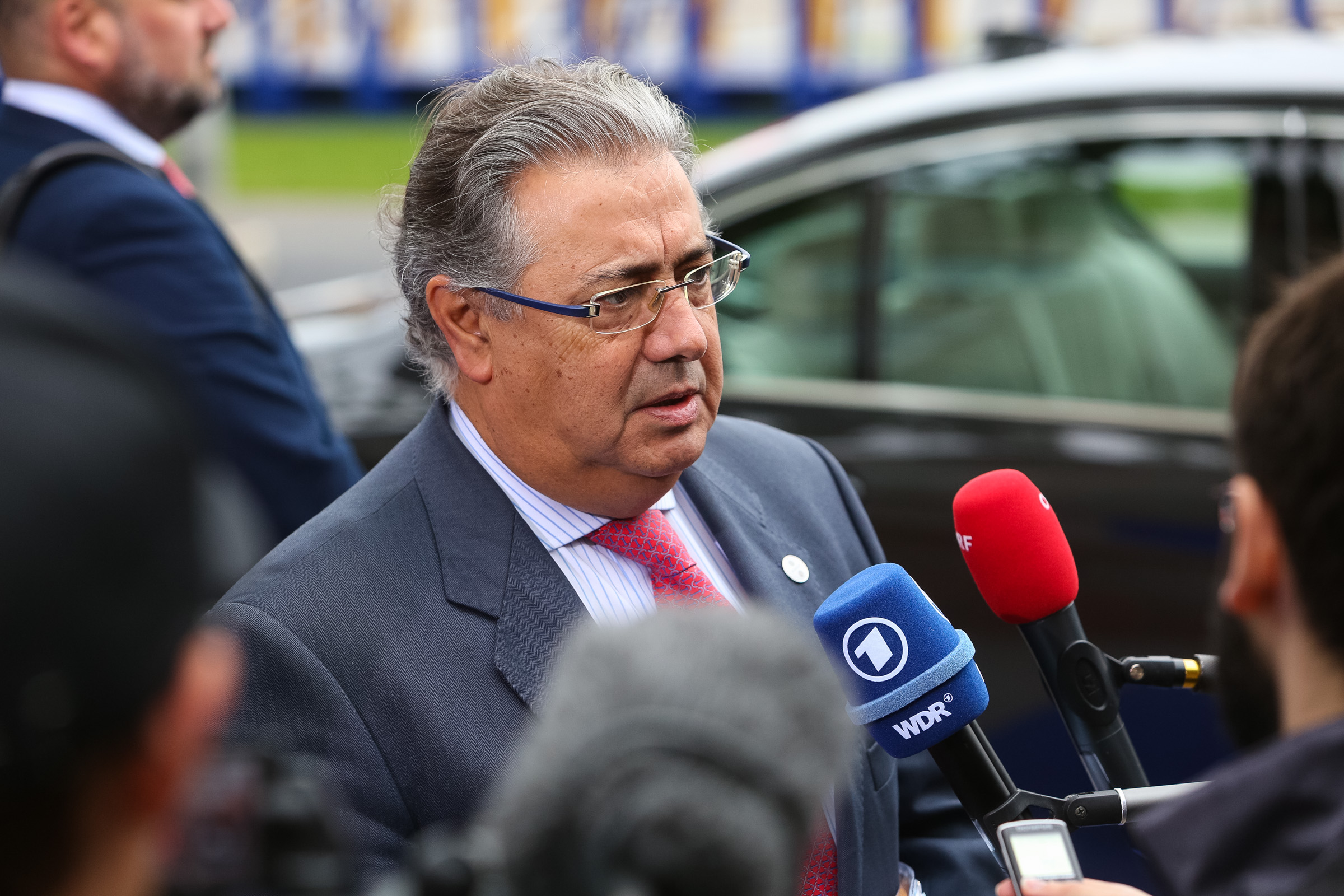
Zoido in 2017.

In 1996, Zoido is appointed Director General of Relations with the Judiciary by the Minister of Justice, Margarita Mariscal de Gante. In 2000, he is appointed Government's Delegate to Castilla-La Mancha until 2002, where he is named Government's Delegate in Andalusia. Two years later he is elected General Secretary of the People's Party of Andalusia, position he held until 2006.

== Political career ==
In the 2007 local elections Zoido ran as PP's candidate for Mayor of Seville, in that election the PP achieved the same number of councillors as the Socialist Party, that managed to win the mayorship thanks to a coalition agreement with United Left.

In the 2008 Andalusian regional election Zoido was elected to the Parliament of Andalusia, where he chaired the Committee on Cultural Affairs.

In the 2011 local elections Zoido ran again for Mayor, the PP secured a majority of the city council and Zoido was elected Mayor. Between 2011 and 2012, he was the President of the Spanish Federation of Municipalities and Provinces.

The 2012 Andalusian Parliamentary Elections, where the People's Party achieved a plurality of seats for the first time in the history of the autonomous community but failed to secure the presidency, meant a major crisis in the regional branch of the Party. In July that year Zoido, whose condition as mayor of Andalusia's capital and biggest city gave him a big name, was chosen regional chairman of the party at the XIII Regional Congress.

Zoido sought reelection in the 2015 elections, but the PP failed to achieve a majority of the council, and an agreement of the Socialist Party, Participa Sevilla (a list supported by Podemos) and United Left, ousted Zoido.

Zoido led the PP's List for the 2015 and 2016 General elections being elected to Congress on both occasions. In November 2016 he was appointed Minister of the Interior. He played a key role in the 2017-18 Spanish constitutional crisis and during his tenure the terrorist attacks in Barcelona and Cambrils occurred.
