= Teófila Martínez =

Spanish politician (born 1948)

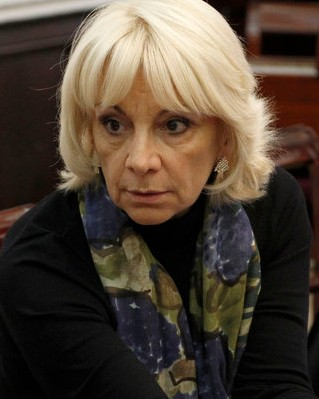

Congress of Deputies
- In office 2009–2015
- Constituency: Spain

Mayor
- In office 2000–2008

Congress of Deputies
- In office 1989–1999

Personal details
- Born: 1948 (age 77–78)
- Party: People's Party
- Other political affiliations: Popular Alliance
- Occupation: Politician

María Teófila Martínez Saiz (born 1948) is a Spanish politician. She was the mayor of Cádiz, Andalusia, from 1995 to 2015.

Martínez is a member of the People's Party and member of the Congress of Deputies of Spain since the 80's.

== Career ==
An architect by profession, Martínez was elected as provincial secretary-general of the Popular Alliance of Cádiz in December 1982. From 1983 to 1987 she was a councilor of El Puerto de Santa María. She has been mayor of Cádiz since 1995, and the most voted mayor of the provincial capitals of Spain in the municipal elections of 2003 and 2007 with about 60% of the vote. With the municipal elections of 2011 validates winning for the fifth time by an absolute majority.

She has been a Member of the Congress of Deputies since 1989 (except for the period 2000 to 2008 when she was in the Andalusian parliament as senator for two consecutive terms). She presided over the People's Party of Andalusia from 1999 to 2004 and served as its spokeswoman at the Commission of Public Works of the Congress of Deputies and Commissions Coordinator of the Popular Party in Congress.

During her tenure as mayor, she authorized the dig of the railway passing through Cádiz, the upkeep of city's emblematic buildings, the development of idle shipyards, as well as the start of construction of the second bridge and conducting of Bicentennial of the Cortes of Cádiz, year in which commemorated the hundred years of the Constitution of Cádiz in 1812, the first Spanish constitution. Cádiz became in 2012 a Latin American Capital of Culture and hosted the 22nd Ibero-American Summit.

In early 2013, Teofila Martinez presented the proposal to boost the creation of the logistics platform in Southern Europe in the province of Cádiz, located between three continents (Europe, Africa and America) and located in a strategic axis of communication as is the Strait of Gibraltar. This proposal was supported by the Government of the nation, embodied with the presentation in the city of Cádiz in November 2013 national logistics strategy.

Martínez was criticized by social networks when on 23 August 2013 she spoke to the press complaining about the views of users of social networks on the Spanish politicians and explaining her dismay at people asking social aid in the City argued that "there are people asking to eat and having a Twitter is costing them money". Social networks argued, among other things, that two years ago she suggested to install WiFi free zones on several streets and squares of the city. On 13 September 2013 she apologized for her remarks saying that she recognizes that technology knows "the right thing" and argued that is not required to know the language of the new technologies.

Following the 2015 Spanish local elections, Martínez was replaced by José María González Santos.

In 2017, the Cádiz City Council had filed an investigation quarry against Martínez for her mishandling of funds directed at Onda Cádiz Televisión in 2009, which resulted City Council to lose €1,884,757.

On 20 September 2021, Martínez, along with Francisco Piniella Corbacho had attended a conference at the Port of Cádiz Bay.
