= Pansequito =

- Birth name: José Cortés Jiménez
- Born: 8 January 1945; La Línea de la Concepción, Spain
- Died: 17 February 2023 (aged 78); Bormujos, Spain
- Genres: Flamenco
- Occupation: Singer
- Instrument: Vocals
- Years active: 1963–2023

José Cortés Jiménez (8 January 1945 – 17 February 2023), known mononymously as Pansequito, was a Spanish flamenco singer.

== Early life ==
José Cortés Jiménez was born in La Línea de la Concepción, into a family of flamenco tradition, he spent his childhood in Seville and later in El Puerto de Santa María, which would give him the artistic surname of his beginnings and from where he would be named adoptive son in 2001.

== Career ==
Pansequito began his professional career in the tablaos of Malaga, but in 1963, Manolo Caracol hired him to work in his Madrid tablao Los Canasteros. Pansequito was part of the company of Antonio Gades, with which he sang in countries like England, Hungary, Yugoslavia and Greece. He was then considered a flamenco renovator, obtaining in 1974 the 'Creativity Award' in the National Contest of Córdoba. Regarding this award, the Jerez-born flamencologist Juan de La Plata has said: "For sounding different and bringing a refreshing air to flamenco, he was precisely awarded the National Competition of Córdoba."

In recent years, Pansequito had regularly participated in the Andalusian festival circuit and visited others abroad such as Mont de Marsan, in 2007. In 2010, he won the XXIV Compás del Cante trophy in Granada. Among his latest recordings, "A mi bahía" (2001) and "Un canto a la libertad" (2009), produced by Diego Magallanes, with the collaboration of Moraíto, Miguel Poveda and Raimundo Amador, stand out. In 2010, he won the Giraldillo for Singing at the Bienal de Flamenco for "Un Canto a la Libertad". In 2018, a tribute to his figure was organized, but it had to be suspended.

== Personal life ==
Pansequito was married to Aurora Vargas who was also a cantaora. He died on 17 February 2023, at the Hospital San Juan de Dios del Aljarafe, due to a brain tumor. The town of Gines, where he had lived with his wife for more than 30 years, declared a day of official mourning for his death. He was cremated in the SE-30 funeral home in Seville, and his ashes were interred at the El Puerto de Santa María Cemetery.
