= Juan Herrera =

Juan Herrera is the name of:

== People ==
=== Football ===
- Juan Herrera Sánchez (1939–2014), Spanish footballer
- Juan Sebastián Herrera, Colombian footballer
- Juan Herrera-Perla, Salvadoran footballer

=== Other ===
- Juan Herrera (boxer) (born 1958), Mexican boxer
- Juan Herrera (tennis), Spanish tennis player
- Juan de Herrera, Spanish architect
- Juan Felipe Herrera, American poet
- Juan Vicente Herrera, Spanish politician

== Places ==
- Juan de Herrera, Dominican Republic
