= Herrerita =

Herrerita is the name of:

- Herrerita (footballer, born 1914), Spanish footballer
- Herrerita (footballer, born 1939), Spanish footballer
