= José Luis Sanz =

Spanish politician (born 1968)

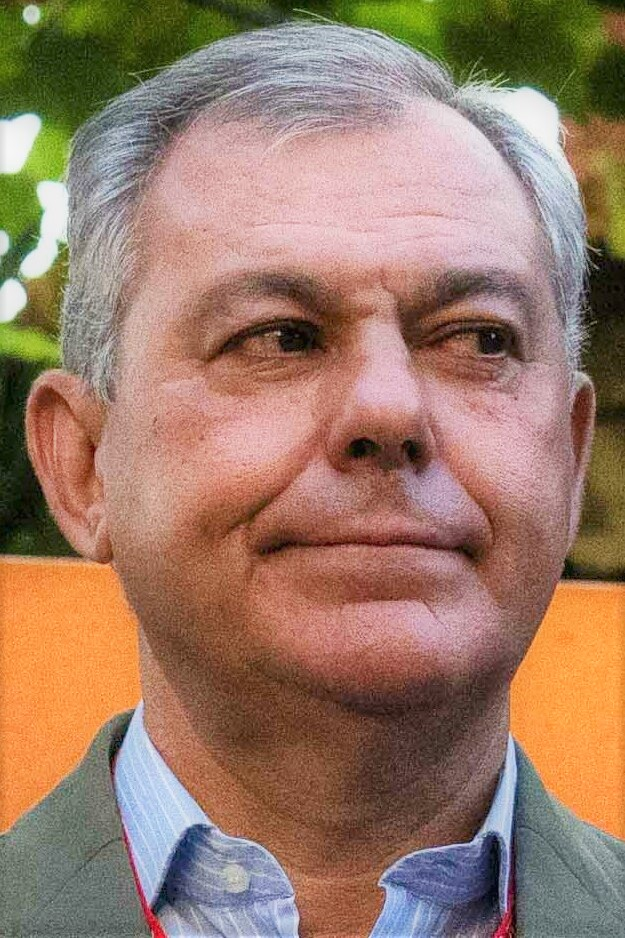
- Sanz in 2023

Mayor of Seville
- Incumbent
- Assumed office 17 June 2023
- Preceded by: Antonio Muñoz

Mayor of Tomares
- In office 16 June 2007 – 4 October 2021
- Preceded by: Antonia Hierro Recio
- Succeeded by: José María Soriano Martín

Member of the Senate
- In office 11 June 2011 – 21 May 2019
- Constituency: Seville
- In office 3 December 2019 – 17 August 2023
- Constituency: Seville

Personal details
- Born: 21 September 1968 (age 58) Seville, Andalusia, Spain
- Party: People's Party

José Luis Sanz Ruiz (born 21 September 1968) is a Spanish politician. He served as a senator from 2011 to 2023 with a brief interlude in 2019, and as a member of the Parliament of Andalusia from 2000 to 2012. He was mayor of Tomares from 2007 to 2021, and mayor of Seville since 2023.

== Personal life ==
Born in Seville, Sanz graduated in Business and Economic Studies from the University of Seville. As of 2021, he has a son and a daughter.

== Political career ==
=== Local politics ===
Sanz joined the People's Party (PP) in 1990. He was elected mayor of Tomares in the Comarca Metropolitana de Sevilla in 2007, serving until he was chosen in 2021 as the PP candidate for mayor of Seville in the 2023 election. Prior to his time in office, Tomares had been dominated by the Spanish Socialist Workers' Party (PSOE). His party came first with 14 out of 31 seats, requiring negotiations with the three councillors from Vox to form a government. The two parties did not form a coalition and Sanz became mayor in a minority government, with Vox warning him that he would need their support to pass a budget.

In June 2024, disputes over the budget led to a vote of confidence in Sanz, which was approved by the 14 PP members and rejected by the 17 others. The opposition then had a 30-day window to propose a new candidate for mayor.

=== Senator ===
President of the Seville branch of the PP since 2007, Sanz was elected to the Senate of Spain by the Seville constituency in the 2011 general election. The result was a historic best for his party, which cut its deficit in the PSOE-dominated constituency by a quarter of a million votes and from 27 percentage points to 3.5. He lost his seat by a 2,500-vote margin in the April 2019 general election, winning it back in November. He said that he would not run in the 2023 Spanish general election in order to concentrate on being mayor of Seville.
