= CD Internacional de Fútbol Sevilla Dos Hermanas =

Association football club in Spain

Inter Sevilla
- Full name: Club Deportivo Internacional de Fútbol Sevilla Dos Hermanas
- Nickname: Mineros (Miners)
- Founded: 2006 (as CD Gerena)
- Ground: San José, Gines, Andalusia, Spain
- Capacity: 350
- Manager: Lolo Ortiz
- League: División de Honor – Group 1
- 2025–26: División de Honor – Group 1, 11th of 16
Home colours	Away colours

Club Deportivo Internacional de Fútbol Sevilla Dos Hermanas, known as Inter Sevilla, is a Spanish football team based in Gines, Seville, in the autonomous community of Andalusia. Founded in 2006 as Club Deportivo Gerena, it plays in División de Honor – Group 1, holding home matches at San José.

== History ==
CD Gerena logo (used until 2024)

Founded in 2006, Gerena first reached the Tercera División in 2013, after winning their Primera Andaluza group. In 2015, the city's stadium was renamed to José Juan Romero Gil, the club's manager who took them to the fourth tier.

In July 2023, amidst a financial crisis, Gerena was close to a name change to Internacional de Fútbol Sevilla Dos Hermanas, but the move later fell through. In August of the following year, the move did materialize, with the club leaving the city of Gerena for Gines.

== Season to season ==
Season	Tier	Division	Place	Copa del Rey
2006–07	8	2ª Prov.	3rd	
2007–08	8	2ª Prov.	1st	
2008–09	7	1ª Prov.	6th	
2009–10	7	1ª Prov.	2nd	
2010–11	6	Reg. Pref.	1st	
2011–12	5	1ª And.	5th	
2012–13	5	1ª And.	1st	
2013–14	4	3ª	6th	
2014–15	4	3ª	3rd	
2015–16	4	3ª	5th	
2016–17	4	3ª	11th	
2017–18	4	3ª	7th	
2018–19	4	3ª	14th	
2019–20	4	3ª	14th	
2020–21	4	3ª	8th / 2nd	
2021–22	5	3ª RFEF	5th	
2022–23	5	3ª Fed.	3rd	
2023–24	5	3ª Fed.	7th	
2024–25	5	3ª Fed.	18th	
2025–26	6	Div. Hon.		

- 8 seasons in Tercera División
- 4 seasons in Tercera Federación/Tercera División RFEF
