= Antonio Muñoz (Spanish politician) =

Spanish politician (born 1959)

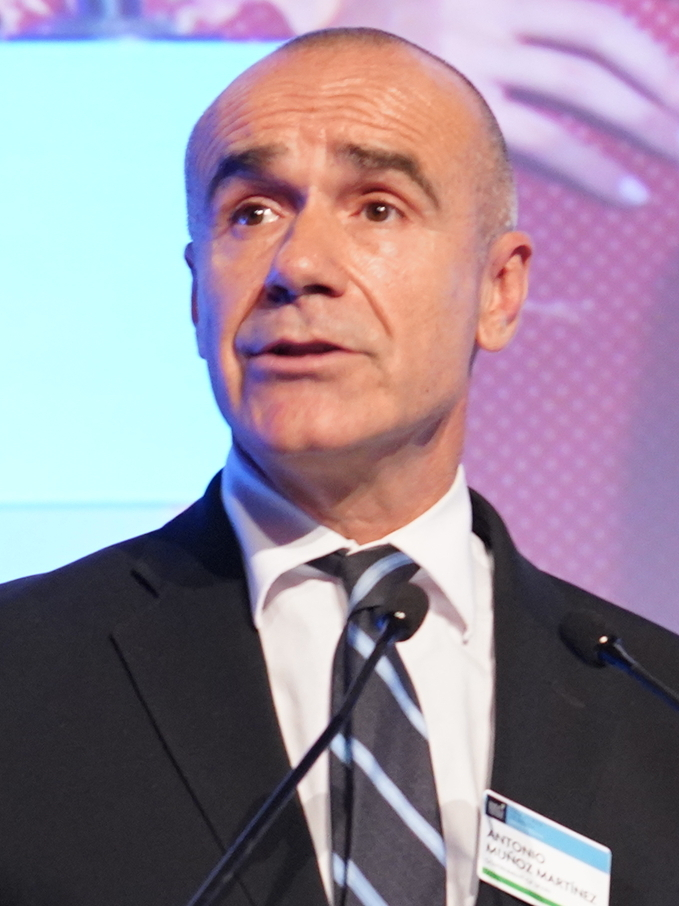
- Muñoz in 2018

Mayor of Seville
- In office 3 January 2022 – 17 June 2023
- Preceded by: Juan Espadas
- Succeeded by: José Luis Sanz

Member of the Seville City Council
- Incumbent
- Assumed office 11 June 2011

Personal details
- Born: 29 October 1959 (age 67) La Rinconada, Andalusia, Spain
- Party: PSOE-A

Antonio Muñoz Martínez (born 29 October 1959) is a Spanish Socialist Workers' Party (PSOE) politician. He has been a city councillor in Seville since 2011 and the city's mayor from 2022 to 2023. He was elected to the Senate of Spain in 2023.

== Biography ==
Born in La Rinconada, Province of Seville, Muñoz relocated to Barcelona at the age of 3 due to his father's construction work. His father was then transferred back to Andalusia, taking the family to Fuengirola; he had a brief time back in La Rinconada due to his mother's illness. He graduated in Economic and Business Sciences from the University of Málaga, where he began to affiliate with left-wing politics, joining the Spanish Socialist Workers' Party (PSOE) in 1983. He was elected the same year to the city council in La Rinconada, where he remained for eight years.

Muñoz gained a Master of Business Administration degree from the San Telmo Business School, also in Málaga, and became director general of Tourism Planning for the Regional Government of Andalusia. In 2011, he was elected to Seville's city council as sixth on the PSOE's list, and became an assistant spokesman for the party group. As the councillor for Urban Space, Culture and Tourism, he worked to attract events to Seville including the Goya Awards, the Michelin Awards, the MTV Europe Music Awards and a visit by Barack Obama.

In June 2021, mayor Juan Espadas became the PSOE candidate for President of the Regional Government of Andalusia, resigning his local office in December. On 3 January 2022, Muñoz was invested as mayor.

The PSOE were defeated in the 2023 Seville City Council election, with José Luis Sanz of the People's Party becoming mayor. Muñoz continued as his party's spokesman in the council. During the local election, Sanz campaigned against Muñoz by linking him to the PSOE prime minister of Spain, Pedro Sánchez.

In the 2023 Spanish general election, Muñoz was elected to the 15th Senate of Spain by the Seville constituency. He was third on their list and they took three of the four seats.

== Personal life ==
Muñoz is openly gay. As of January 2022, he had been in a relationship with the novelist Fernando Repiso for over twenty years.
