= 2023 Seville municipal election =

Election in the Spanish municipality of Seville

- 28 May 2023

All 31 seats in the City Council of Seville 16 seats needed for a majority
- Opinion polls
- Registered: 531,886 ▼1.7%
- Turnout: 326,118 (61.3%) ▲2.5 pp
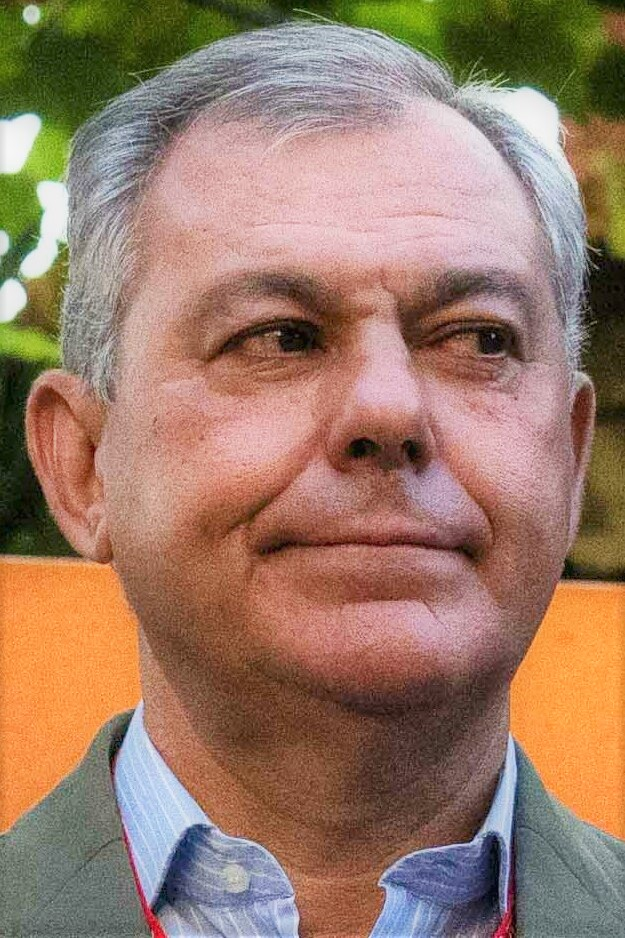

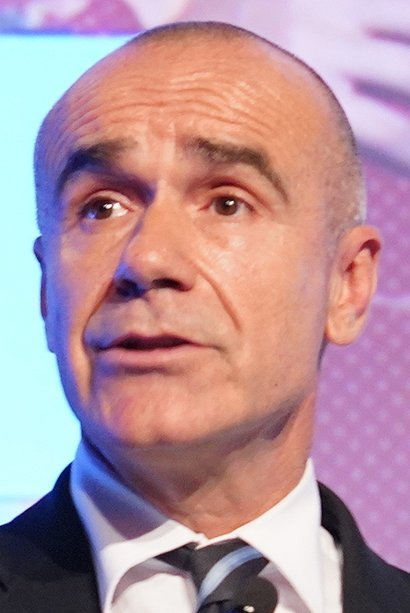

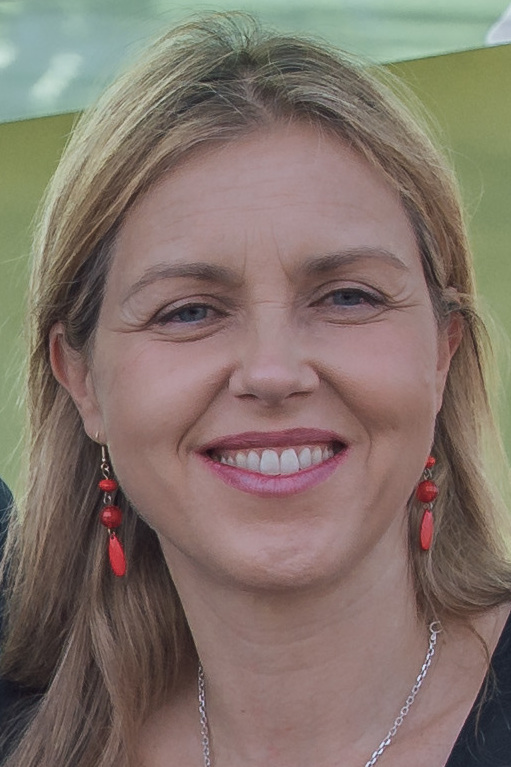

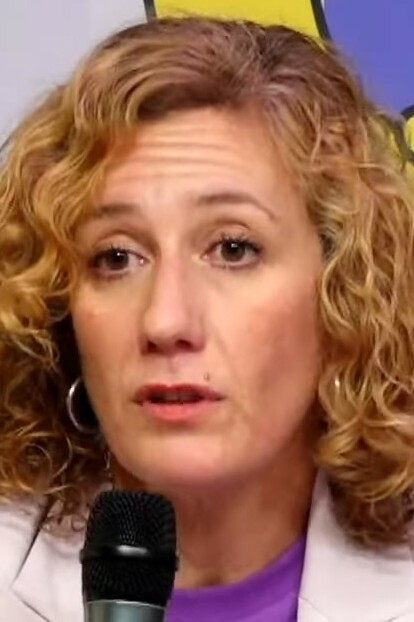

	First party	Second party	Third party
Leader	José Luis Sanz	Antonio Muñoz	Cristina Peláez
Party	PP	PSOE–A	Vox
Leader since	21 July 2021	3 January 2022	2015
Last election	8 seats, 23.1%	13 seats, 39.2%	2 seats, 8.0%
Seats won	14	12	3
Seat change	▲6	▼1	▲1
Popular vote	132,778	110,204	28,727
Percentage	41.2%	34.2%	8.9%
Swing	▲18.1 pp	▼5.0 pp	▲0.9 pp
	Fourth party	Fifth party
Leader	Susana Hornillo	Miguel Ángel Aumesquet
Party	Con Andalucía	CS
Leader since	27 January 2023	9 November 2022
Last election	3 seats (Adelante) (Note: Within the Adelante alliance in the 2019 election.)	4 seats, 12.5%
Seats won	2	0
Seat change	▼1	▼4
Popular vote	22,803	5,069
Percentage	7.1%	1.6%
Swing	n/a	▼10.9 pp
Mayor before election
Antonio Muñoz
PSOE
Mayor after election
José Luis Sanz
PP

A municipal election was held in Seville on 28 May 2023 to elect the 12th City Council of the municipality. All 31 seats in the City Council were up for election. It was held concurrently with regional elections in twelve autonomous communities and local elections all across Spain.

== Overview ==
Under the 1978 Constitution, the governance of municipalities in Spain—part of the country's local government system—was centered on the figure of city councils (Spanish: ayuntamientos), local corporations with independent legal personality composed of a mayor, a government council and an elected legislative assembly. The mayor was indirectly elected by the local assembly, requiring an absolute majority; otherwise, the candidate from the most-voted party automatically became mayor (ties were resolved by drawing lots). In the case of Seville, the top-tier administrative and governing body was the City Council of Seville.

=== Date ===
The term of local assemblies in Spain expired four years after the date of their previous election, with election day being fixed for the fourth Sunday of May every four years. The election decree was required to be issued no later than 54 days before the scheduled election date and published on the following day in the Official State Gazette (BOE). The previous local elections were held on 26 May 2019, setting the date for election day on the fourth Sunday of May four years later, which was 28 May 2023.

Local assemblies could not be dissolved before the expiration of their term, except in cases of mismanagement that seriously harmed the public interest and implied a breach of constitutional obligations, in which case the Council of Ministers could—optionally—decide to call a by-election.

Elections to the assemblies of local entities were officially called on 4 April 2023 with the publication of the corresponding decree in the BOE, setting election day for 28 May.

=== Electoral system ===
Voting for local assemblies was based on universal suffrage, comprising all Spanish nationals over 18 years of age, registered and residing in the municipality and with full political rights (provided that they had not been deprived of the right to vote by a final sentence), as well as resident non-national European citizens, and those whose country of origin allowed reciprocal voting by virtue of a treaty.

Local councillors were elected using the D'Hondt method and closed-list proportional voting, with a five percent-threshold of valid votes (including blank ballots) in each municipality. Each municipality was a multi-member constituency, with a number of seats based on the following scale:

Population	Councillors
<100	3
101–250	5
251–1,000	7
1,001–2,000	9
2,001–5,000	11
5,001–10,000	13
10,001–20,000	17
20,001–50,000	21
50,001–100,000	25
>100,001	+1 per each 100,000 inhabitants or fraction +1 if total is an even number

The law did not provide for by-elections to fill vacant seats; instead, any vacancies arising after the proclamation of candidates and during the legislative term were filled by the next candidates on the party lists or, when required, by designated substitutes.

== Parties and candidates ==
The electoral law allowed for parties and federations registered in the interior ministry, alliances and groupings of electors to present lists of candidates. Parties and federations intending to form an alliance were required to inform the relevant electoral commission within 10 days of the election call, whereas groupings of electors needed to secure the signature of a determined amount of the electors registered in the municipality for which they sought election, disallowing electors from signing for more than one list. In the case of Seville, as its population was between 300,001 and 1,000,000, at least 5,000 signatures were required. Additionally, a balanced composition of men and women was required in the electoral lists, so that candidates of either sex made up at least 40 percent of the total composition.

Below is a list of the main parties and alliances which contested the election:

Candidacy	Parties and alliances	Leading candidate	Ideology	Previous result		Gov.	Ref.
Candidacy	Parties and alliances	Leading candidate	Ideology	Vote %	Seats	Gov.	Ref.
PSOE–A	List: Spanish Socialist Workers' Party of Andalusia (PSOE–A)	Antonio Muñoz	Social democracy	39.2%	13	Yes	
PP	List: People's Party (PP)	José Luis Sanz	Conservatism; Christian democracy	23.1%	8	No	
Con; Andalucía	List: We Can (Podemos); United Left/The Greens–Assembly for Andalusia (IULV–CA) – Communist Party of Andalusia (PCA) – The Dawn. Marxist Organization OM (La Aurora (om)) – Republican Left (IR); More Country Andalusia (Más País–Andalucía); Greens Equo (Verdes Equo); Green Alliance (AV); Andalusian People's Initiative (IdPA); Andalusian Greens (LV); Republican Alternative (ALTER)	Susana Hornillo	Left-wing populism Direct democracy Democratic socialism	14.1% (Note: Results for Adelante in the 2019 election.)	4	No	
Adelante; Andalucía	List: Anti-capitalists (Anticapitalistas); Andalusian Spring (Primavera Andaluza); Andalusian Left (IzA); Defend Andalusia (Defender Andalucía)	Sandra Heredia	Andalusian nationalism Left-wing populism Anti-capitalism	14.1%	4	No	
CS	List: Citizens–Party of the Citizenry (CS)	Miguel Ángel Aumesquet	Liberalism	12.5%	4	No	
Vox	List: Vox (Vox)	Cristina Peláez	Right-wing populism Ultranationalism; National conservatism	8.0%	2	No	

== Opinion polls ==
The tables below list opinion polling results in reverse chronological order, showing the most recent first and using the dates when the survey fieldwork was done, as opposed to the date of publication. Where the fieldwork dates are unknown, the date of publication is given instead. The highest percentage figure in each polling survey is displayed with its background shaded in the leading party's colour. If a tie ensues, this is applied to the figures with the highest percentages. The "Lead" column on the right shows the percentage-point difference between the parties with the highest percentages in a poll.

=== Voting intention estimates ===
The table below lists weighted voting intention estimates. Refusals are generally excluded from the party vote percentages, while question wording and the treatment of "don't know" responses and those not intending to vote may vary between polling organisations. When available, seat projections determined by the polling organisations are displayed below (or in place of) the percentages in a smaller font; 16 seats were required for an absolute majority in the City Council of Seville.

Polling firm/Commissioner	Fieldwork date	Sample size	Turnout	PSOE–A	PP	Adelante	Cs	Vox	Podemos	IULV	UPxA	Adelante Andalucía	Lead
2023 municipal election	28 May 2023	—N/a	61.3	34.2; 12	41.2; 14	–	1.6; 0	8.9; 3	(Note: Within ConA.)		7.1; 2	3.7; 0	7.0
GAD3/RTVE–FORTA	12–27 May 2023	?	?	37.0; 13	38.0; 13/14	–	2.0; 0	10.0; 3			5.0; 1/2	4.0; 0	1.0
NC Report/La Razón	22 May 2023	?	?	37.8; 13	36.1; 13	–	–	9.4; 3			8.3; 2	–	1.7
Sigma Dos/El Mundo	15–18 May 2023	1,200	?	38.1; 13/14	36.1; 12/13	–	2.0; 0	9.4; 3			8.2; 2	4.1; 0	2.0
GAD3/ABC	9–18 May 2023	800	?	36.9; 13	36.4; 13	–	2.2; 0	10.4; 3			6.2; 2	3.8; 0	0.5
40dB/Prisa	12–17 May 2023	800	?	36.9; 12/13	34.9; 12	–	2.5; 0	8.7; 3			8.9; 3	4.9; 0/1	2.0
DYM/Henneo	10–15 May 2023	?	?	38.8; 13/14	35.4; 11/12	–	–	9.6; 3			9.0; 2/3	4.2; 0	3.4
Dataestudios/ABC	10–15 May 2023	603	?	36.7; 13	38.3; 13/14	–	2.6; 0	9.5; 2/3			5.9; 1/2	3.9; 0/1	1.6
SocioMétrica/El Español	8–14 May 2023	?	?	38.2; 13/14	33.1; 11/12	–	2.4; 0	11.2; 3/4			8.8; 2/3	4.3; 0	5.1
Data10/Okdiario	9–11 May 2023	1,500	?	37.2; 13	36.1; 12	–	1.7; 0	9.1; 3			8.4; 2	5.2; 1	1.1
Sigma Dos/Antena 3	27 Apr 2023	?	?	37.7; 13/14	36.3; 12/13	–	–	? 3			? 2	–	1.4
CIS	10–26 Apr 2023	1,012	?	39.6; 14/15	33.0; 12/13	–	2.8; 0	7.7; 2/3			9.7; 3	–	6.6
NC Report/La Razón	24 Apr 2023	?	59.3	35.5; 12	36.9; 13	–	–	8.8; 3			8.6; 3	–	1.4
IMOP/El Confidencial	17–19 Apr 2023	809	60	37.6; 13	35.9; 12	–	1.4; 0	9.4; 3			8.9; 3	3.7; 0	1.7
Social Data/Grupo Viva	10–12 Apr 2023	607	?	38.2; 13/14	36.7; 12/13	–	1.8; 0	7.3; 2/3			8.7; 2/3	3.8; 0/1	1.5
Sigma Dos/El Mundo	10–15 Feb 2023	500	?	37.1; 12/13	36.7; 12/13	–	1.5; 0	8.2; 2/3			8.5; 2/3	5.9; 0/1	0.4
PSOE	5 Feb 2023	?	?	? 14	? 11/12	–	? 0	? 2/3			? 3	–	?
CENTRA/CEA	27 Oct–2 Nov 2022	1,500	?	37.2; 12/13	40.0; 13/14	–	3.2; 0	6.3; 2			9.6; 2/3	–	2.8
Dataestudios/ABC	5–13 Oct 2022	600	?	37.0; 13	38.3; 13/14	–	2.2; 0	8.2; 2/3	5.9; 2	4.6; 0	–	–	1.3
2022 regional election	19 Jun 2022	—N/a	64.5	24.3 (8)	41.4 (15)	–	4.3 (0)	11.6 (4)	(Note: Within Por Andalucía.)		8.0 (2)	7.3 (2)	17.1
SW Demoscopia	9–17 Dec 2021	1,007	?	38.6; 13/14	33.2; 11/12	–	4.3; 0/1	10.2; 3/4			11.3; 3/4	–	5.4
GAD3/ABC	15–24 Jun 2021	1,010	?	37.6; 13	35.9; 12/13	–	2.8; 0	10.8; 3			9.1; 2/3	–	1.7
EM-Analytics/Electomanía	5 Mar 2021	600	?	38.6; 14	24.9; 9	–	4.9; 0	15.0; 5			9.2; 3	4.8; 0	13.7
SW Demoscopia/Grupo Viva	8–15 Jun 2020	1,006	?	40.8; 13/14	22.5; 7/8	12.3; 3/4	7.7; 2/3	12.9; 3/4	(Note: Within Adelante Andalucía.)		–	–	18.3
November 2019 general election	10 Nov 2019	—N/a	72.2	31.8 (11)	21.8 (7)	–	8.2 (2)	17.5 (6)			14.6 (5)	–	10.0
2019 municipal election	26 May 2019	—N/a	58.8	39.2; 13	23.1; 8	14.1; 4	12.5; 4	8.0; 2			–	–	16.1

=== Voting preferences ===
The table below lists raw, unweighted voting preferences.

Polling firm/Commissioner	Fieldwork date	Sample size	PSOE–A	PP	Adelante	Cs	Vox	UPxA	Adelante Andalucía	Question	X mark	Lead
2023 municipal election	28 May 2023	—N/a	20.7	25.0	–	1.0	5.4	4.3	2.3	—N/a	38.7	4.3
40dB/Prisa	12–17 May 2023	800	23.9	25.7	–	1.4	5.9	7.6	4.6	20.6	4.0	1.8
CIS	10–26 Apr 2023	1,012	27.9	23.7	–	1.4	5.9	6.4	2.4	24.8	2.8	4.2
Social Data/Grupo Viva	10–12 Apr 2023	607	24.7	26.2	–	0.7	5.1	5.4	2.5	–	–	1.5
CENTRA/CEA	27 Oct–2 Nov 2022	1,500	22.7	29.3	–	0.5	2.9	3.5	0.7	33.2	4.3	6.6
2022 regional election (Note: Does not include non-resident citizens.)	19 Jun 2022	—N/a	15.6	26.5	–	2.8	7.4	5.1	4.7	—N/a	35.4	10.9
SW Demoscopia	9–17 Dec 2021	1,007	36.7	25.4	6.0	2.2	5.0	–	–	11.6	5.5	11.3
SW Demoscopia/Grupo Viva	8–15 Jun 2020	1,006	31.3	15.4	4.3	2.5	4.3	–	–	–	–	15.9
November 2019 general election	10 Nov 2019	—N/a	22.7	15.6	–	5.9	12.5	10.4	–	—N/a	27.8	7.1
2019 municipal election	26 May 2019	—N/a	22.9	13.5	8.2	7.3	4.6	–	–	—N/a	41.2	9.4

=== Preferred Mayor ===
The table below lists opinion polling on leader preferences to become mayor of Seville.

Polling firm/Commissioner	Fieldwork date	Sample size											Other/ None/ Not care	Question	Lead
Polling firm/Commissioner	Fieldwork date	Sample size	Espadas PSOE–A	Muñoz PSOE–A	Pérez PP	Sanz PP	Serrano Adelante	Pimentel CS	Aumesquet CS	Cristina Vox	Hornillo CA	Heredia AA	Other/ None/ Not care	Question	Lead
40dB/Prisa	12–17 May 2023	800	–	26.6	–	27.5	–	–	1.4	5.2	7.7	4.7	10.1	16.9	0.9
Social Data/Grupo Viva	10–12 Apr 2023	607	–	38.9	–	30.4	–	–	0.5	1.5	3.8	3.6	21.3		8.5
SW Demoscopia	9–17 Dec 2021	1,007	–	17.2	–	14.7	3.0	3.1	–	–	–	–	–	–	2.5
SW Demoscopia/Grupo Viva	8–15 Jun 2020	1,006	55.4	–	13.6	–	3.0	3.4	–	1.8	–	–	22.8		41.8

== Results ==
← Summary of the 28 May 2023 City Council of Seville election results →
Parties and alliances	Popular vote			Seats	
Parties and alliances	Votes	%	±pp	Total	+/−
People's Party (PP)	132,778	41.17	+18.02	14	+6
Spanish Socialist Workers' Party of Andalusia (PSOE–A)	110,204	34.17	−5.07	12	−1
Vox (Vox)	28,727	8.91	+0.96	3	+1
With Andalusia (Podemos–IU–MPA–VQ–IdPA–AV–LV–ALTER)^{1}	22,803	7.07	n/a	2	−1
Forward Andalusia (Adelante Andalucía)^{1}	11,974	3.71	n/a	0	−1
Citizens–Party of the Citizenry (CS)	5,069	1.57	−10.88	0	−4
Animalist Party with the Environment (PACMA)^{2}	4,344	1.35	+0.24	0	±0
Blank Seats to Leave Empty Seats (EB)	1,093	0.34	New	0	±0
For a Fairer World (PUM+J)	848	0.26	+0.11	0	±0
Communist Party of the Workers of Spain (PCTE)	586	0.18	New	0	±0
Spanish Phalanx of the CNSO (FE de las JONS)	210	0.07	+0.03	0	±0
Blank ballots	3,857	1.20	+0.48		
Total	322,493			31	±0
Valid votes	322,493	98.89	−0.48		
Invalid votes	3,625	1.11	+0.48		
Votes cast / turnout	326,118	61.31	+2.54		
Abstentions	205,768	38.69	−2.54		
Registered voters	531,886				
Sources
Footnotes: ^{1} Within the Forward Seville: We Can–United Left–Andalusian Spring alliance in the 2019 election.; ^{2} Animalist Party with the Environment results are compared to Animalist Party Against Mistreatment of Animals totals in the 2019 election.

Popular vote
PP	41.17%
PSOE–A	34.17%
Vox	8.91%
ConA	7.07%
Adelante	3.71%
CS	1.57%
PACMA	1.35%
Others	0.85%
Blank ballots	1.20%

Seats
PP	45.16%
PSOE–A	38.71%
Vox	9.68%
ConA	6.45%

== Aftermath ==
=== Government formation ===
Investiture
Ballot →	17 June 2023	
Required majority →	16 out of 31	
José Luis Sanz (PP): • PP (14)	14 / 31	check
Antonio Muñoz (PSOE–A): • PSOE–A (12)	12 / 31	X mark
Cristina Peláez (Vox): • Vox (3)	3 / 31	X mark
Susana Hornillo (ConA): • ConA (2)	2 / 31	X mark
Abstentions/Blank ballots	0 / 31	
Absentees	0 / 31	

== Bibliography ==
- Constitución Española (Constitution). Official State Gazette (in Spanish). 27 December 1978 [version as of 27 September 2011]. BOE-A-1978-31229.
- Ley 7/1985, de 2 de abril, Reguladora de las Bases del Régimen Local (Law 7/1985). Official State Gazette (in Spanish). 2 April 1985 [version as of 29 December 2021]. BOE-A-1985-5392.
- Ley Orgánica 5/1985, de 19 de junio, del Régimen Electoral General (Organic Law 5/1985). Official State Gazette (in Spanish). 19 June 1985 [version as of 3 October 2022]. BOE-A-1985-11672.
- Real Decreto 207/2023, de 3 de abril, por el que se convocan elecciones locales y a las Asambleas de Ceuta y Melilla para el 28 de mayo de 2023 (Royal Decree 207/2023). Official State Gazette (in Spanish). 3 April 2023. BOE-A-2023-8458.
