= Comarca Metropolitana de Sevilla =

- Comarca
- Comarca Metropolitana de Sevilla
- Country: Spain
- Autonomous community: Andalusia
- Province: Seville
- Municipalities: 22 Municipalities

Area
  - Total: 1,484.87 km^{2} (573.31 sq mi)

Population (2024) (Note: Estimate at 1 January 2024: National Statistics Institute (Spain))
  - Total: 1,240,977
  - Density: 835.748/km^{2} (2,164.58/sq mi)
- Time zone: UTC+1 (CET)
  - Summer (DST): UTC+2 (CEST)

Comarca Metropolitana de Sevilla is one of the nine comarcas of the province of Seville, in Andalusia, Spain. It contains the capital of the province, Seville, as well other municipalities that form a conurbation around it. This comarca was established in 2003 by the Government of Andalusia.

Comarca Metropolitana de Sevilla shares borders with other six comarcas: Campiña de Carmona, Campiña de Morón y Marchena, and Bajo Guadalquivir to the east; Costa Noroeste de Cádiz to the south; El Aljarafe to the west; and Sierra Norte de Sevilla and Vega del Guadalquivir to the north.

== Municipalities ==
The comarca contains the following 22 municipalities:

Arms	Municipality	Area (km²)	Population (2024) (Note: Estimate at 1 January 2024: National Statistics Institute (Spain))	Density (/km²)
	Alcalá de Guadaira	284.82	76,922	270.07
	Almensilla	14.19	6,653	468.85
	Bormujos	12.27	22,970	1,872.05
	Camas	11.66	28,705	2,461.84
	Castilleja de la Cuesta	2.16	17,153	7,941.20
	Castilleja de Guzmán	2.04	2,863	1,403.43
	Coria del Río	62.06	31,095	501.05
	Dos Hermanas	160.48	140,430	875.06
	Espartinas	22.77	16,482	723.85
	Gelves	8.29	10,473	1,263.33
	Gines	2.9	13,524	4,663.45
	Isla Mayor	114.51	5,781	50.48
	La Puebla del Río	375.14	11,871	31.64
	La Rinconada	138.84	40,529	291.91
	Mairena del Aljarafe	17.74	47,898	2,700.00
	Palomares del Río	13.13	9,277	706.55
	Salteras	57.54	5,580	96.98
	San Juan de Aznalfarache	4.11	23,090	5,618.00
	Santiponce	8.41	8,625	1,025.56
	Sevilla	141.42	687,488	4,861.32
	Tomares	5.22	25,488	4,882.76
	Valencina de la Concepción	25.17	8,080	321.02
Comarca Metropolitana de Sevilla		1,484.87	1,240,977	835.75
