= Herrerita (footballer, born 1939) =

Spanish footballer

Personal information
- Full name: Juan Herrera Sánchez
- Date of birth: 27 December 1939
- Place of birth: Gines, Spain
- Date of death: 20 November 2014 (aged 74)
- Height: 1.69 m (5 ft 7 in)
- Position: Forward

Senior career*
Years	Team	Apps	(Gls)
1962–1966	Recreativo de Huelva	52	(9)
1966–1967	Mallorca	20	(1)
1967–1968	Recreativo de Huelva	24	(5)
1969–1970	Badajoz		
Total		96	(15)
- * Club domestic league appearances and goals

Juan Herrera Sánchez (27 December 1939 – 20 November 2014), known as Herrerita, was a Spanish professional footballer who played as a forward.

== Career ==
Born in Gines, Herrerita played for Recreativo de Huelva, Mallorca and Badajoz.
