= Gines =

Municipality in Andalusia, Spain

- Municipality
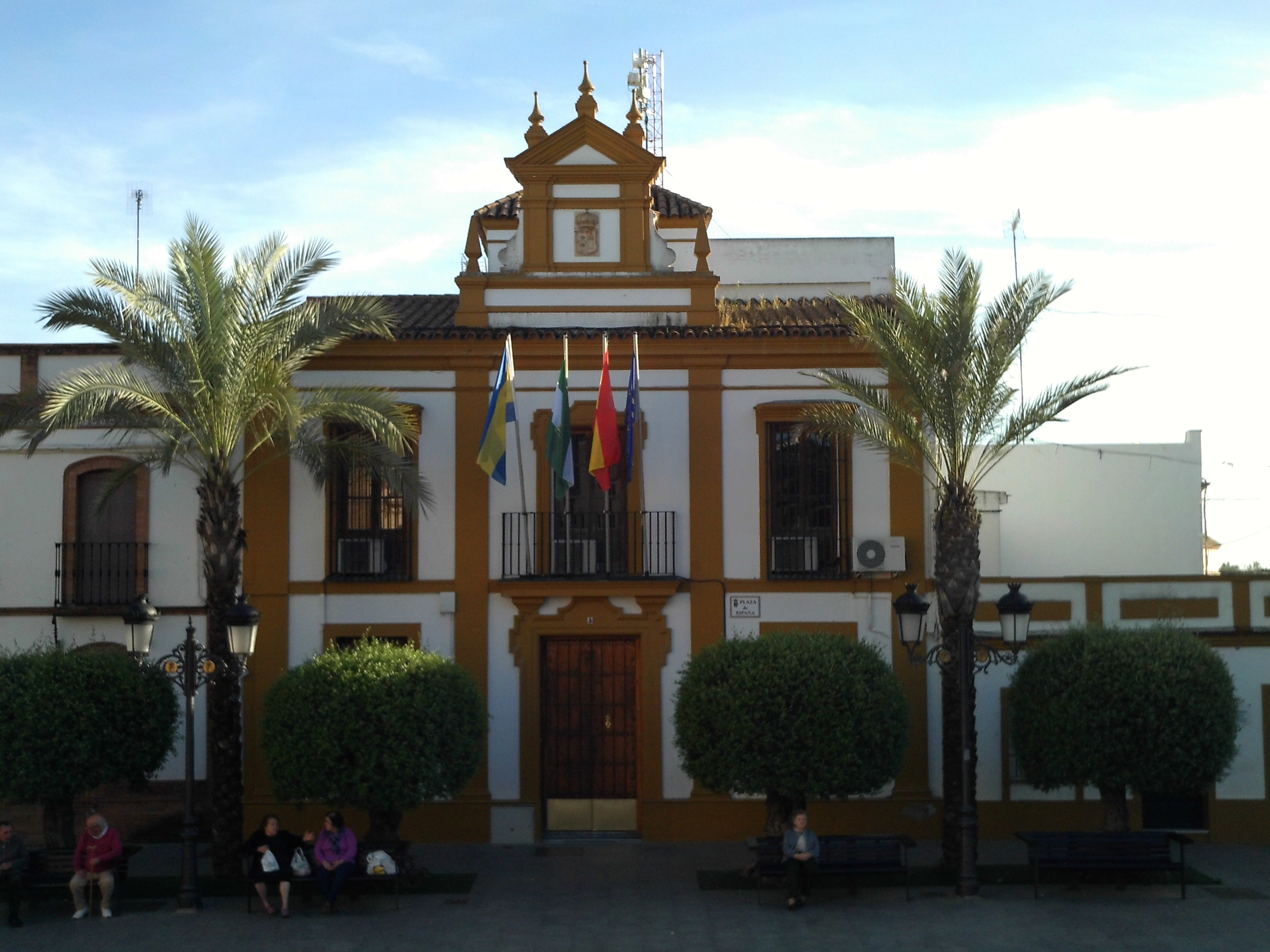
- Town hall

- Flag Coat of arms

- Location within Andalusia Location within Spain Location within Europe
- Coordinates: 37°23′15″N 6°04′41″W
- Sovereign State: Spain
- Autonomous community: Andalusia Andalusia
- Province: Seville
- Comarca: Comarca Metropolitana de Sevilla

Government
  - Body: Ayuntamiento de Gines
  - Mayor (2019): Romualdo Garrido Sánchez (PSOE)

Area
  - Total: 2.9 km^{2} (1.1 sq mi)
- Elevation: 123 m (404 ft)

Population (2025-01-01)
  - Total: 13,634
  - Density: 4,700/km^{2} (12,000/sq mi)
- Demonym: Ginense
- Time zone: UTC+1 (CET)
  - Summer (DST): UTC+2 (CEST)
- Postcode: 41960
- Website: Official website

Gines is a municipality in the south-west Spain, in the province of Seville, Andalusia. It is part of the metropolitan area of Seville. Gines has a population of 13,529 inhabitants as of 2021 and an area of 2.9 km^{2} (1.1 sq mi).

Founded in Roman times, the land has been inhabited since prehistoric times, and for centuries the production of olives and olive oil has been of great importance due to the fertility of its land. Since the mid-twentieth century a process population growth began due to the proximity to Seville. By the end of the century almost all of the land area was built-up, forming a conurbation with nearby towns. Today it has a service based economy and it is one of the municipalities with the highest income in Andalusia.

== Geography ==
Gines is located on the Aljarafe plateau, at an altitude of 123 metres above sea level and about 6 km from Seville (which is almost at sea level). The municipalities closest to Gines are Bormujos, Valencina de la Concepción, Espartinas and Castilleja de la Cuesta, with which it is surrounded, forming a conurbation.

Settled on fertile land with good drain and a low level of erosion, however, the natural environment of Gines is strongly anthropized, as a result of the urbanization of most of the municipality area. The traditional agrarian system, based mainly on olive grooves, has been gradually reduced to its practical disappearance. This process has led, practically, to the non-existence of singular natural elements in the municipality.

The relief of Gines is undulating, being the highest areas the old town and El Majelo quarter, and the lowest areas that built near the old basin of the Sequillo stream and those near the former road to Huelva. From a geological point of view, Gines is located within the geological unit corresponding to the Baetic depression, formed mainly by sands, sandstones with calcareous cement and marls deposited during the upper Miocene.

Gines is crossed by the Meachica stream from east to west, which is channeled and piped except in a small undeveloped area. This stream discharges runoff water into the Sequillo stream, which crosses Gines from north to south and is also piped from mid of the 20th century to prevent floods, and discharges its waters into the Riopudio stream.

=== Climate ===
Gines has a Mediterranean climate (Köppen climate classification Csa), featuring very hot, dry summers and mild, partially wet winters. Like most Mediterranean climates, Gines is drier during summers and wetter during winters. The annual average temperature is 18.0 °C (64 °F). With an average temperature of 27.0 °C (81 °F), August is the hottest month of the year, while January is the coldest one with 9.7 °C (49 °F). The annual average rainfall is 586 mm (23 in), November is the wettest month with 88 mm (3 in) of rain and July is the driest one, with an average of 1 mm (0 in).

Snowfall is virtually unknown. The last important snowfall was the 2 February 1954, albeit the 10 January 2010 some snowflakes fell down, without setting.

== History ==
=== Ancient Gines ===
Gines was named Ab-Gena in the ancient times. Some small funerary ornaments from the time of the megaliths have been found, that would indicate that the inhabitants of this time professed the religion of the Sun and they known art of metal casting. La Pastora and Matarrubilla dolmens, dated about 3,000 BC, are located about 2 km from city center although belonging to the city limits of Valencina. We suppose that the few families that inhabited the land would lead an existence of small farmers and hunters. Later, Gines would be part of the Tartessian territory.

In Roman times, Ab-Genna was constituted as a villa. There are signs that Ab-Genna was commanded by a dismissed military, placing the villa in the vicinity of the current Hacienda of the Holy Angel (Hacienda del Santo Ángel), to which more dwellings were added around as the population increased. Although there is no documentation about this subject, we suppose that the small Ab-Genna should have had links to Italica, being a few kilometers apart.

After the fall of the Empire, Gines was occupied by the Visigoths until the 8th century, although there is little documentary information on the subject.

=== Islam and Christianity ===
After the Muslim invasion commanded by Tariq and Mussa in 711, the whole Aljarafe was occupied by Muslim leaders. Ab-Genna was renamed al-Genne or Gines, which in Arabic means Garden of Eden. The Aljarafe was used as settlements for Yemeni and Muladi families, who were at enmity after the conquest because of the distribution of the land.

From the Almohad period (12th or 13th century), underground galleries have been found in 2017, located about 6 metres (20 ft) below the Conde de Ofalia street and measuring about 30 metres (98 ft) in length. It is thought that they were used to store grain or oil.

The conquest of Isbiliya by Ferdinand III in 1248 led to the expulsion of the Muslim families of Gines to the kingdom of Granada and Gines was populated by Castilian settlers who had served as cookers and confectioners in the siege of Seville.

A century after the Castilian conquest, Gines already had a Town Hall and lordship that was handed over in 1370 by King Enrique II of Trastámara to the admiral of Castile Fernán Sánchez de Tovar, who bequeathed it to his son Rodrigo Tovar upon his death. The lordship was sold in 1388 until it reached the hands of Diego López de Zúñiga, Justicia Mayor of Seville, who in 1412 ceded it as dowry to his daughter Leonor de Zúñiga.

At the end of the Middle Ages, a Mozarabic-style church had been built on the parish plot, which disappeared in the works of the 18th century.

=== Modern Age ===
In the 16th century Gines was transferred to the Guzmán family, to which it was linked until the abolition of the lordships in Spain in the 19th century. Gines, with no more than 200 inhabitants, was left outside of the swaps led by the noble families to not pay taxes to the crown of Castile.

By 1840, according to Madoz's dictionary, Gines had increased its population to about 800 inhabitants, and had a parish church, a hermitage, two primary schools, a prison, a granary, a well and a cemetery. The economy was based on the production of wine, olive oil, vinegar and eau-de-vie, with a flour mill and an oil mill.

=== Historical documentation ===
At the parish we can find the sacramental and accounting books, which contains plenty of information. There are also booklets of population counts for the First Holy Communion from 1740 to 1954.

The municipal archive has documentation available from 1880 to the present day. A good part of it is digitized. The rest of the documentation about the municipality is available in the archive of the Chancery of Granada.

== Demographics ==
The following table shows the demographic evolution of Gines since the 16th century, based on data from the INE and the 1571 census of Philip II. All data refer to the de jure population, except in 1857 and 1860, which refer to de facto population, and in 1571, which refers to families as was customary at the time. A factor of five has been used to convert them to inhabitants.

Year	Population
1571	360
1787	519
1842	792
1857	964
1860	965
1877	1069
1887	1013
1897	1096
1900	1123
1910	980
1920	1176
1930	1481
1940	1762
1950	1840
1960	2128
1970	2902
1981	4117
1991	6351
2001	10918
2011	13254
2021	13529

From the 1960s, and especially the 1990s, an exponential increase in the population began, which has continued until 2010, increasing the population by six in 50 years. This increase in population has recently come to a halt due to the real estate crisis, and to the fact that the municipality is almost entirely built-up except for small scattered areas (the old La Española factory, Tabladilla area, etc.).

== Urban structure ==
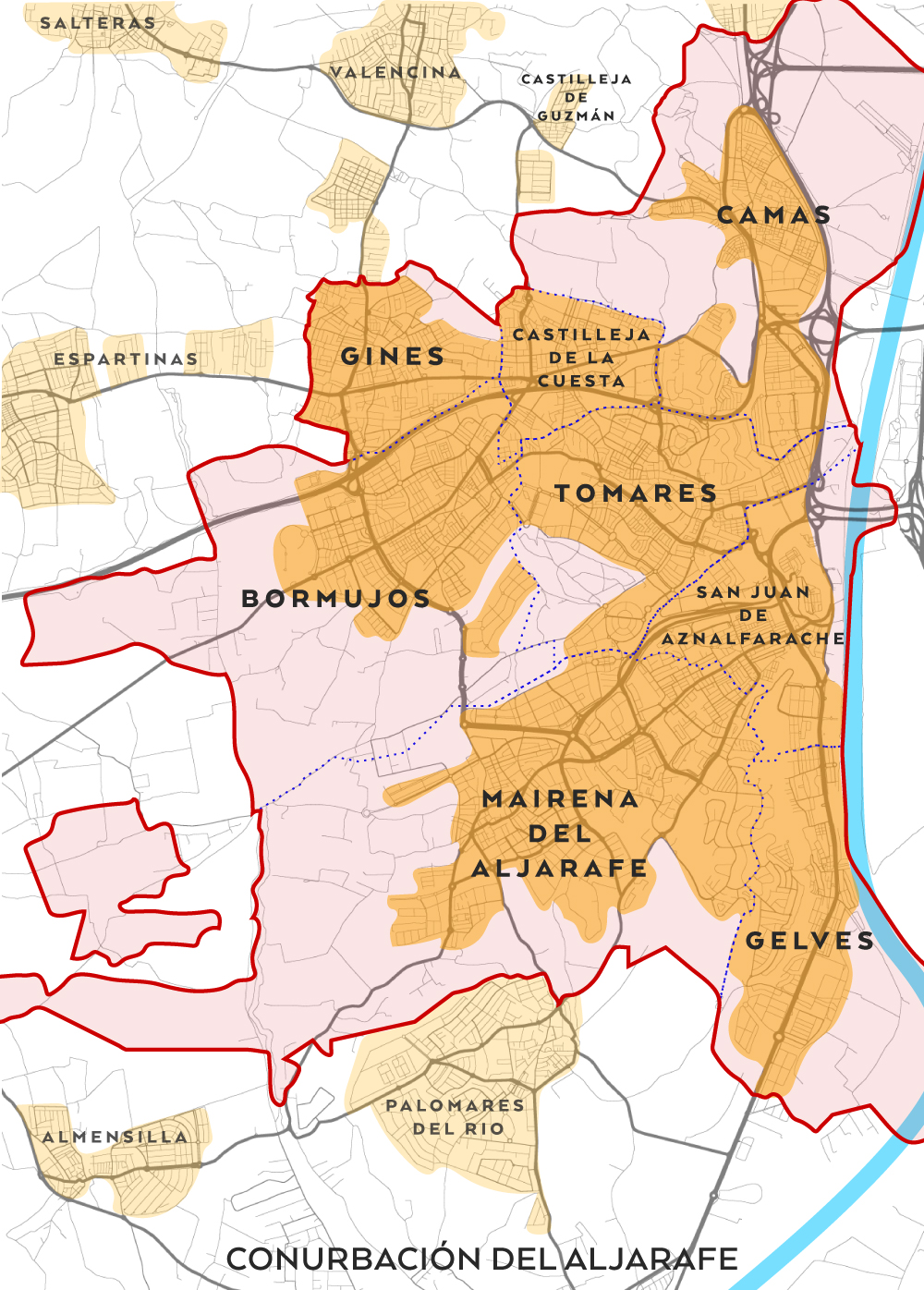
Gines in the Aljarafe conurbation

Gines is structured around three axes that have emerged over time: the old town, Europe Avenue (former road to Huelva), located south of the old town in an east–west direction, and Columbus Street (former road to Valencina), located west of the old town in a north–south direction.

As stated in the history section, Gines was formed near the current Hacienda of the Holy Angel, possibly because of its strategic location as it is situated in the most elevated area of the surroundings. Over time, the surroundings of this area would form what is the current old town, which was completed in the Middle Ages linked to several estates for the production of wine and oil. Today, the old town comprises the areas around the axis that runs from the Hacienda of the Holy Angel to the Hermitage of Saint Rosalie on the one side, and from the Bethlehem Street to the Count of Ofalia Street on the other, with the current Spain Square situated at the confluence of both.

At the beginning of the 20th century, bourgeoisie families in Seville started to build recreational Villas around the axis of the former road to Huelva (current Europe Avenue). Around the 1950s, both sides of the road were consolidated and new developments of detached houses were started, trying to give Gines a garden city character. These new housing developments, together with the growth of the old town, caused the two areas to merge. Some of these recreational villas are protected by their unique architecture.

In the 1960s, the area of the former road to Valencina (now Colombus Street) began to be developed in a similar way to the Europe Avenue, but also semi-detached houses were built. As in the previous case, a few years later the east side of this area was merge with the old town, and in the 1980s the south side was merge with the Europe Avenue area, forming the single urban continuum that exists today.

About the 2000s, the land of Gines was almost completely built-up and reached the neighbor municipalities, forming the Aljarafe conurbation, within the metropolitan area of Seville. In the 1990s, the Servialsa Industrial Park was built at the southern end of the municipal boundary, to replace industries which were being relocated to other towns due to residential pressure. In the 2010s, the industrial park was extended and reached the limits of the nearby towns of Bormujos and Espartinas.

== Government ==
The political administration of Gines is carried out through a democratic council whose members are elected every four years by universal suffrage. According to the provisions of the Organic Law on the General Electoral System, the Municipal corporation is made up of 17 councillors.

The following table list the mayors since 1964.

Legislature	Name	Party
1979–1983	José Antonio Cabrera Pérez (since 1964)	Independent
1983–1987	José Antonio Cabrera Pérez	Independent
1987–1991	Manuel Camino Míguez	Independent
1991–1995	Manuel Camino Míguez	Independent
1995–1999	Manuel Camino Míguez	Independent
1999–2003	Francisco Muñoz Quirós (1999–2002); Francisco González Cabrera (2002–2003)	PSOE; PP
2003–2007	Francisco González Cabrera	PP
2007–2011	Manuel Camino Payán	PSOE
2011–2015	Manuel Camino Payán	PSOE
2015–2019	Manuel Camino Payán (2015); Romualdo Garrido Sánchez (2016–2019)	PSOE; PSOE
2019–	Romualdo Garrido Sánchez	PSOE

== Economy ==
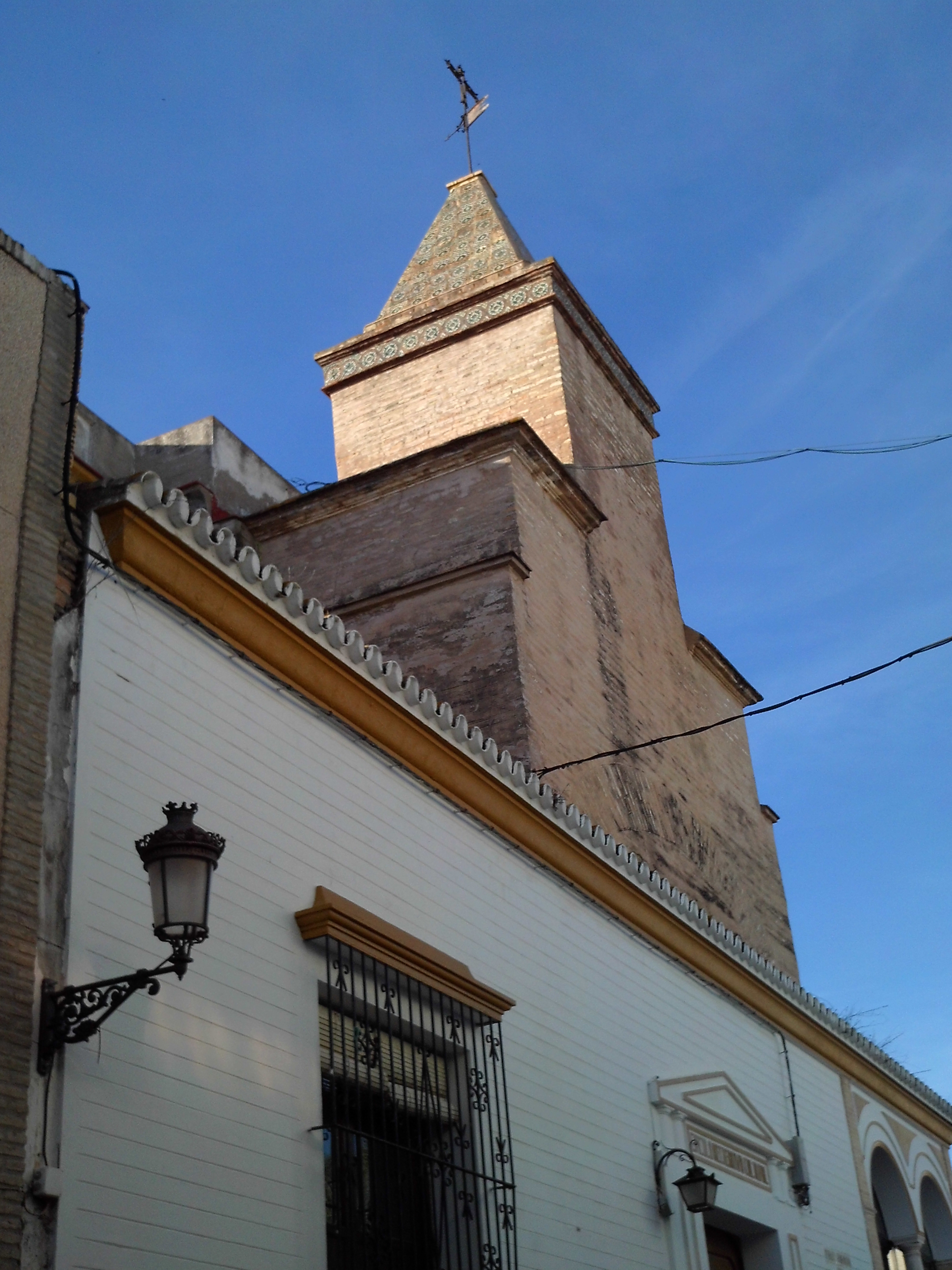
Counterweight tower over Gines' gentlemen's club, showing that the building was built over a former olive oil mill.

Gines is among the 100 municipalities, with more than 5,000 inhabitants, with the highest declared income in Spain, according to a study carried out by the Fundación de Estudios de Economía Aplicada. Another study by the Spanish Tax Agency published in 2018 indicates that Gines is the eighth municipality with the highest income in Andalusia.

According to the Statistical Institute of Andalusia, as of 2016 in Gines there are 858 establishments with economic activity, mainly dedicated, by the number of establishments, to commerce, professional and technical activities and hospitality. There is a local entrepreneurs and merchants society to look after their interests.

The Servialsa Industrial park and the Gines Plaza Shopping Park are located within the municipal district. The Pétalo Business Park will be built jointly with the bordering municipalities of Bormujos and Espartinas.

Historically, olive production was of great importance, with the creation, especially from the 18th century onwards, of several haciendas for the production of olive oil and, from the 20th century onwards, related industries, mainly dedicated to the manufacture of barrels, packaging and logistics. The last major industry in the sector to have its headquarters in the locality was the La Española factory, known for its olives and pickles, which from 1956 to 2004 was sited in the municipality. The factory was moved to the town of Aznalcázar because it had no capacity for expansion, as it was surrounded by houses due to population growth.

== Transport ==
Gines is connected to its surroundings by the Quinto Centenario motorway, the old Seville-Huelva national road and regional roads. Several lines of the Consorcio de Transportes del Área de Sevilla (Seville Metro Area Transport Consortium) pass through the town, linking it both with Seville and with other towns in the Aljarafe area. Nearby is the Salteras suburban train station, which is part of the C-5 line of the Seville suburban trains. There is also a permanent taxi stand (belonging to the Aljarafe Taxi Joint Provision Area) and the TNC companies Bolt, Cabify and Uber provide services in Gines.

=== Bus lines ===
Gines forms part of the Seville Area Transport Consortium, which is included in zone B. With the card of the Consortium it is possible to take the buses that pass through the town and transfer to other lines of the Consortium, the Seville buses or the metro. The Consortium lines that stop go through Gines are:

M-102A External Aljarafe Circular (direction A)
M-102B External Aljarafe Circular (direction B)
M-105 Salteras – Ciudad Expo Metro Station (Mairena del Aljarafe)
M-160 Seville – Gines
M-166 Seville – Sanlucar la Mayor
M-167 Seville – Villanueva del Ariscal
M-168 Sevilla – Benacazón (through Espartinas)
M-174 Sevilla – Las Pilas – La Gloria

In addition to the lines of the Consortium, the Seville – Huelva line of the company Damas has a stop in Gines.

== Main sights ==
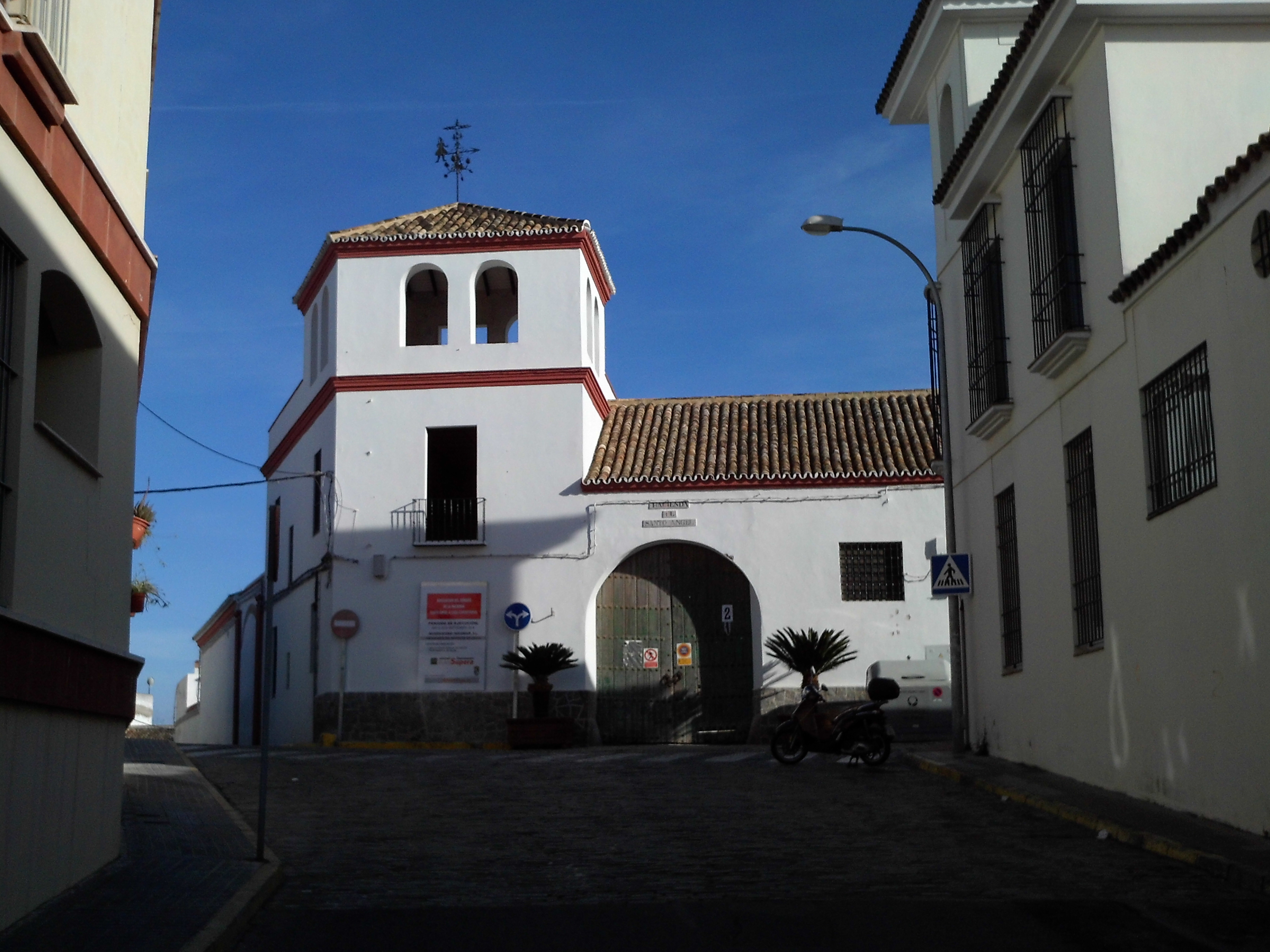
Hacienda of the Holy Angel.

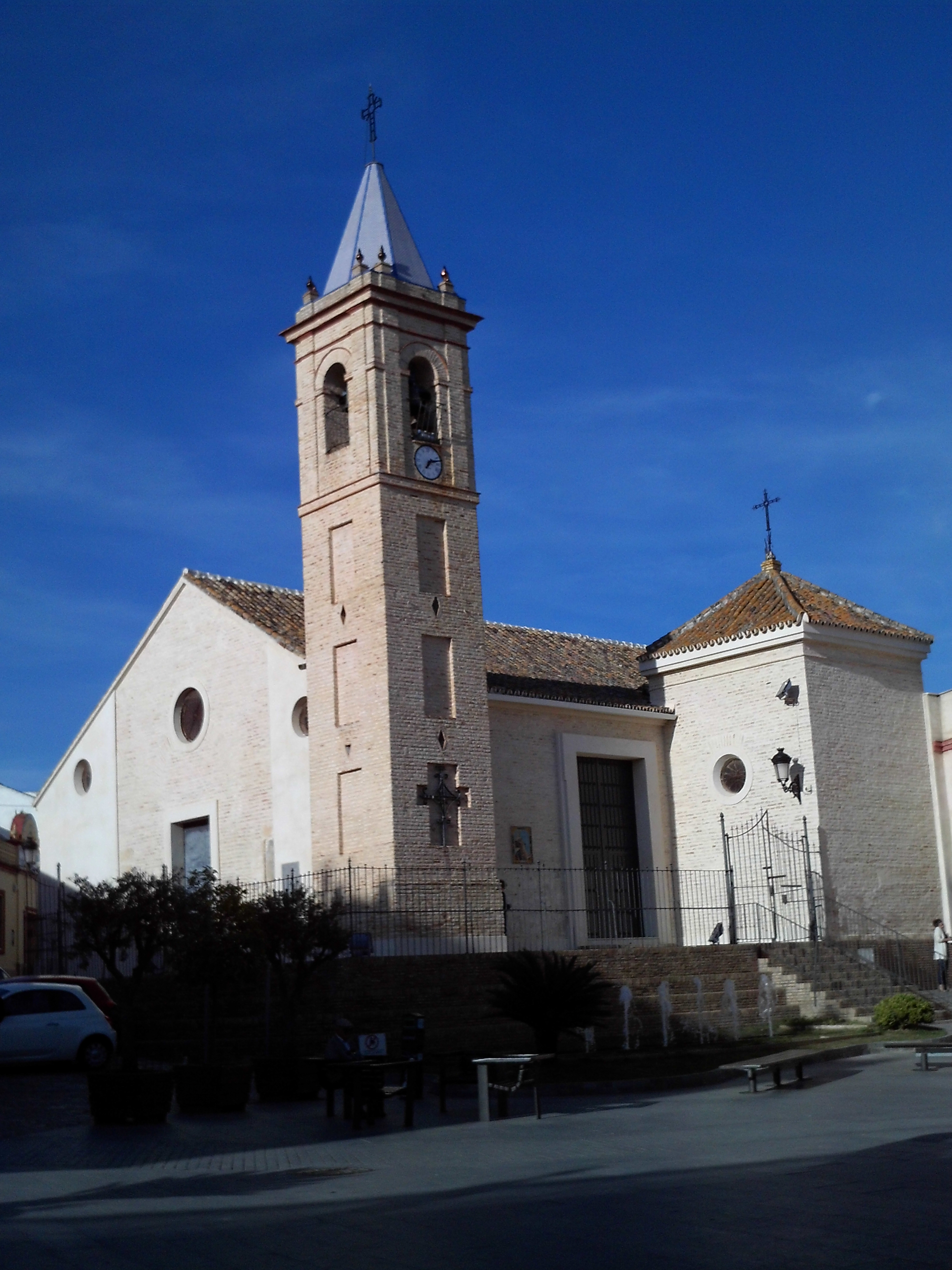
Church of the Virgin of Bethlehem.

- Church of the Virgin of Bethlehem (Iglesia de la Virgen de Belén): It was built in the 18th century over an older church. It architectural style is mudejar. Its plan is Latin cross-shaped and has a nave and two aisles. The High Altarpiece is in Rococo style, presided by the image of Our Lady of Bethlehem, an anonymous work from the end of the 16th century. In the right aisle, we can see the Christ of the Vera-Cruz, also an anonymous work from the 16th century. There are several paintings of the 17th and 18th centuries, the main one is "The Ascension of Christ", of Domingo Martínez.
- Hermitage of Saint Rosalie (Ermita de Santa Rosalía): The Hermitage is a three-nave building built in 1723. It is presided by the sculpture of Saint Rosalie of Palermo, a work from the 18th century.
- Hacienda of the Marquis of Torrenueva (Hacienda del Marqués de Torrenueva): It was the old palace of the Marquis of Torrenueva. It was built in the late 17th century and has a baroque facade. Most of the palace has residential and commercial use, but until 2002, part of it was used as the old municipal library.
- Hacienda of Saint Rosalie (Hacienda de Santa Rosalía): It was built in the 18th century and was the birthplace of Narciso Fernández, count of Heredia-Spínola. There is evidence that in later centuries it was reconverted into a convent and later a winery. In 2004 the building was acquired by the municipality and since 2011 it houses the municipal library, the school of music, and the theatre.
- Hacienda of the Holy Angel (Hacienda del Santo Ángel): It emerged in the 18th century and has an area of 3,000 m^{2}. It operated as an oil factory until the 1990s, when it was relocated to a nearby town. Due to its location, historical documentation and the existence of columns of Andalusian origin, it is believed that it was the place where Gines was founded. It is composed of three buildings: The oil mill, the foreman's house and the stables, along with several patios and gardens. It is currently being restored to become the new headquarters of the Town Hall and an oil museum.
- Park Councillor Dolores Camino (Parque Concejala Dolores Camino): It is the main park in Gines. It was built in the 1960s, and later expanded in the 1990s and 2018. It has an area of 25,000 m^{2}. It has a lake with a duck colony, a stage for performances, children's play areas (including a 40-meter zip line), picnic areas and a restaurant.

== Festivals and events ==
=== Winter ===
- Constitution Day and Paella Contest. Together with the institutional acts on the occasion of the anniversary of the Constitution, every year a multitudinous Paella Contest is held, in which hundreds of people gather in the Juan de Dios Soto Walk to taste this dish.
- Medieval and Christmas market. In December, the Juan de Dios Soto Walk, the Real Street and the Spain Square travels back in time to the Middle Ages (5th to 15th centuries), offering visitors craft stalls, thematic exhibitions of the era, music and parades.
- Christmas carols Contest. Held on days close to Christmas, this contest organized by the City Council. The most outstanding groups of bell ringers in the province and even from other parts of Andalusia and Extremadura take part in it.
- Rooster's Mass. Tradition maintained since ancient times. It is interesting for the performances of traditional Christmas carol choirs and the discovery of the Child Jesus, celebrated in the Church of the Virgin of Bethlehem at midnight.
- Cavalcade of Magi. It takes place on the eve of the Epiphany. Organized by the Association of Friends of the Three Wise Men, it derives from the primitive parades organized in the seventies. About ten carriages parade. The adoration of the Child Jesus takes place in the Spain Square.
- Candelaria Procession. February. Religious procession and presentation of newborns in the parish. Commemoration of the presentation of the Child in the church on the first Sunday in February. The Virgin of Bethlehem, local patron saint, processions through the town.
- Carnival. The competition of satirical groups of performers has become in recent years one of the most important in the province, so from 2012 it was decided to introduce a preliminary elimination phase, in addition to holding the competition entirely in the House of Culture "El Tronío". The parades of costumes and carriages flood the town with color and fantasy for everyone.
- Burial of the Sardine. This celebration was incorporated in 2008 to the festive calendar of the locality as end to the Carnival. It begins with a parade through the streets of the municipality with the great deceased sardine. The procession then arrives at the Park of the Culture, where the proclamation and various performances by carnival groups take place. The day ends with the burning of the sardine.

=== Spring ===
- Holy Week. The procession on Good Friday afternoon of the Holy Christ of the Vera Cruz and Our Lady of Sorrows, two very valuable images that are venerated in the Church of Our Lady of Bethlehem, stands out for its order and seriousness. On Easter Sunday, Holy Week closes in Gines with the procession through its streets of Our Lady of Bethlehem, patron saint of the town. Since 2012, this procession has been held in the morning, which has contributed to increasing the attendance.
- Pilgrimage to El Rocío. The Confraternity of Our Lady of El Rocío of Gines is one of the oldest and most distinguished of all those who come every year to El Rocío. The Sevillanas songs are an unmistakable part of the identity of the people of Gines. At the request of the Town Hall, in 2010 the Andalusian Regional Government declared the departure day a Festival of Tourist Interest in Andalusia, and it is also a local holiday. Since 2013, the departure day to El Rocío is the Wednesday before Pentecost.
- Corpus Christi. This is one of the celebrations with more tradition than those that take place in the municipality. The procession goes around the numerous altars that neighbours and groups place along the route. On this day, the streets are carpeted with rosemary and flowers that impregnate the air. It is a local holiday in the municipality.

=== Summer ===
- Saint Genesius (San Ginés) Fair. July. Founded in 1970, the family character of its marquee tents (casetas) are characteristic features of this Fair, which since 2000 has had a new site. The Town Hall programs great musical performances for the weekend.
- Pilgrimage of Saint Genesius (San Ginés). The image of Saint Genesius is carried in an ox cart among the numerous pilgrims who, accompanying the Saint, spend a festive day together. In 2012, the pilgrimage was moved to the pine forest that bears the name of the Saint.

=== Autumn ===
- Anniversary of the Coronation of the Virgin of Sorrows. 6 September. A floral offering commemorates the anniversary of the canonical coronation of the image.
- Una Pará en Gines. September. For four days, the event includes a large number of equestrian activities for all ages based on the pilgrimage to El Rocío tradition. Attended by over 70,000 people, has become one of the greatest tourist attractions of Gines and since 2018 is declared a Festival of Tourist Interest in Andalusia.
- Festivals of the Rosary of Gines. The Glorious Proclamation of the Holy Rosary opens the town's oldest festivity, which consist in the transfer of the miraculous image of Saint Rosalie and religious acts like the hand-kissing.

== See also ==
- List of municipalities in Seville
