= Bormujos =

Bormujos, Spain
- town
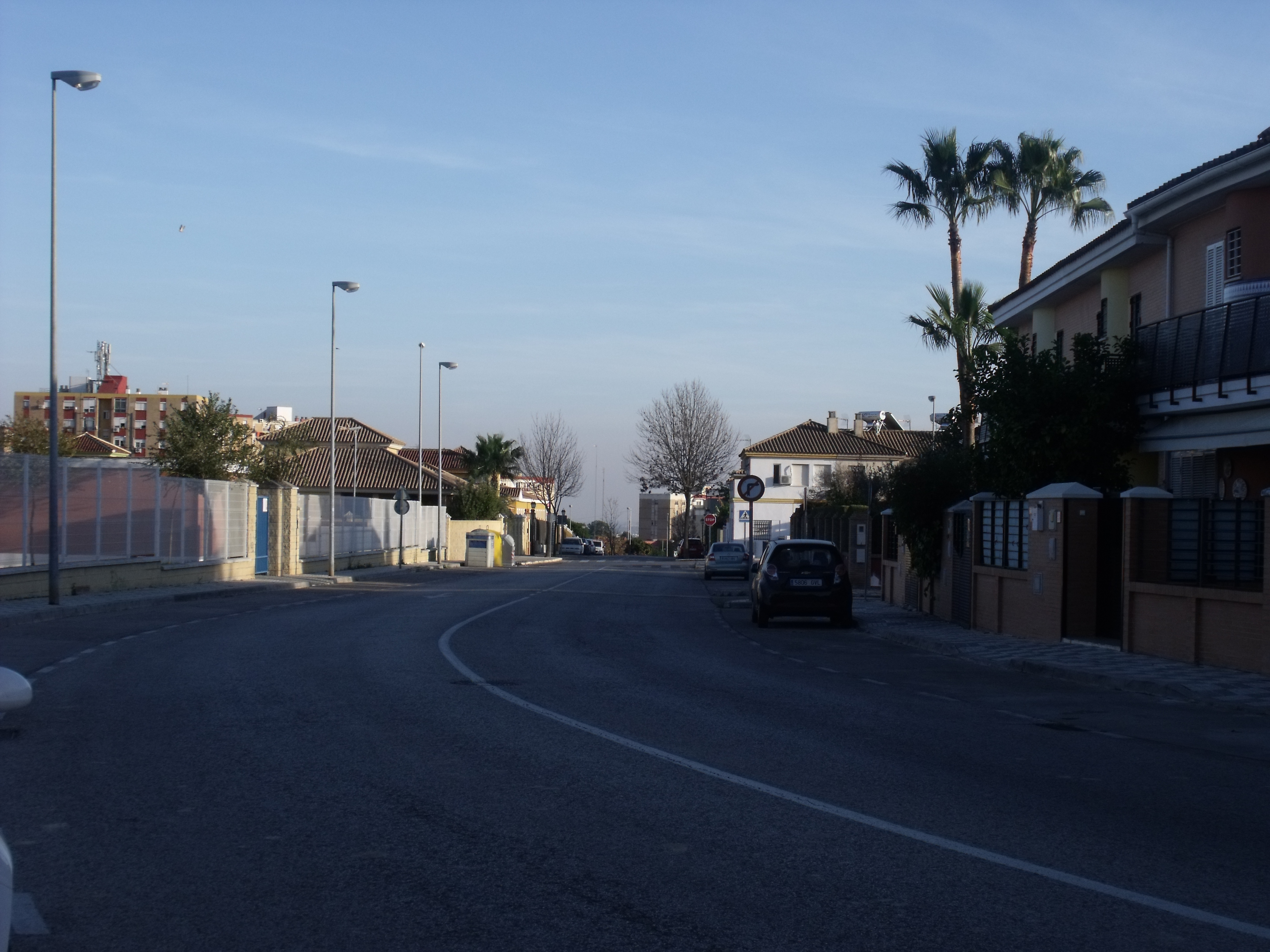
- Street of Bormujos.

- Flag Coat of arms
- Interactive map of Bormujos, Spain
- Country: Spain
- Province: Seville
- Municipality: Bormujos

Area
  - Total: 12 km^{2} (4.6 sq mi)
- Elevation: 98 m (322 ft)

Population (2025-01-01)
  - Total: 23,071
  - Density: 1,900/km^{2} (5,000/sq mi)
- Time zone: UTC+1 (CET)
  - Summer (DST): UTC+2 (CEST)
- Website: http://www.bormujos.net

Bormujos is a town located in the province of Seville, Spain.

== See also ==
- List of municipalities in Seville
