= 13th Senate of Spain =

Session of Spain after 2019 election

| ← | 12th | 14th | → |
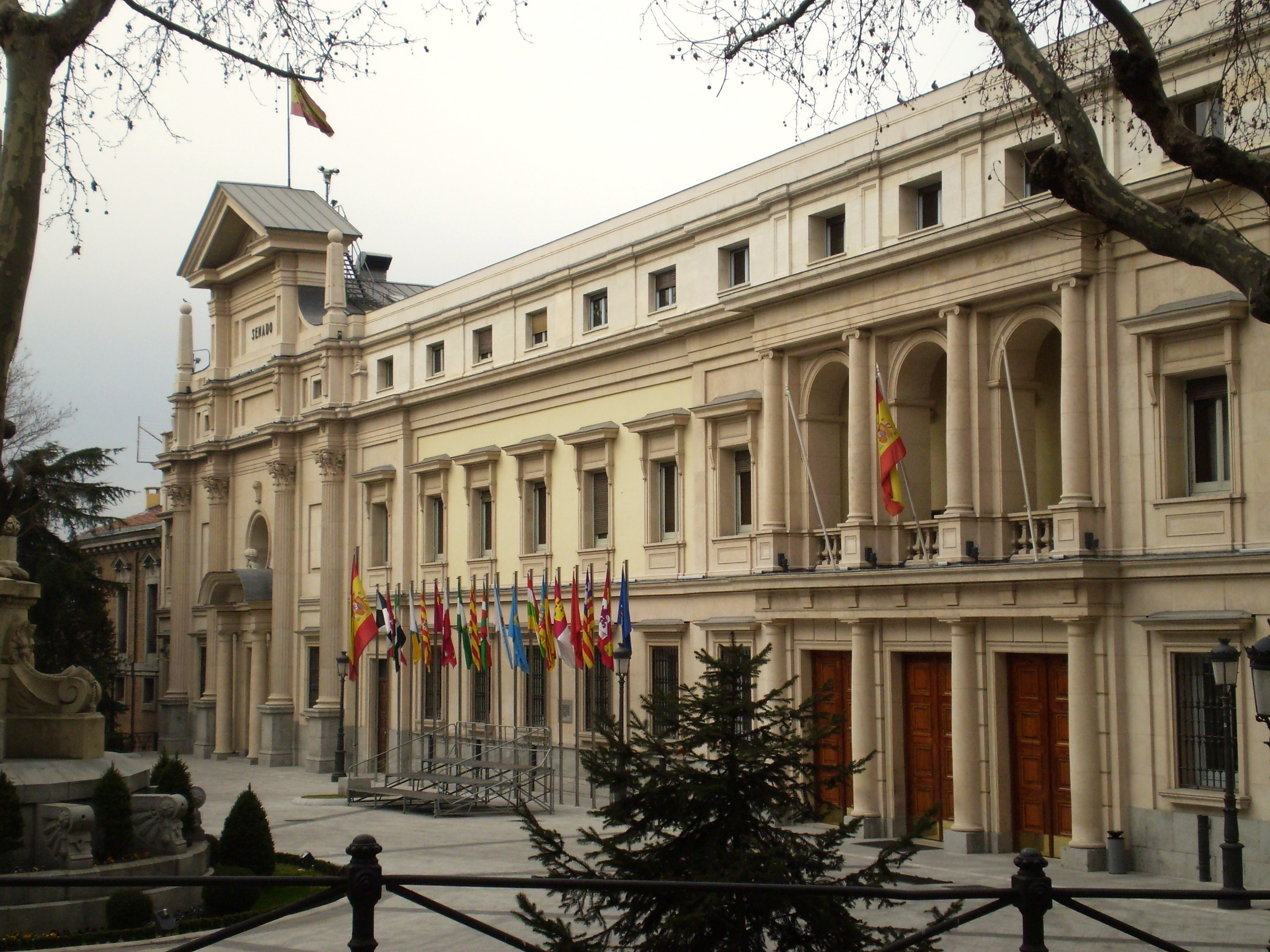

Overview
- Legislative body: Senate of Spain
- Meeting place: Palacio del Senado
- Term: 21 May 2019 – 24 September 2019
- Election: 28 April 2019
- Government: Sánchez
- Website: senado.es

Senators
- Members: 266
- President: Manuel Cruz (PSOE)
- First Vice-President: Cristina Narbona (PSOE)
- Second Vice-President: Pío García-Escudero (PP)
- First Secretary: Fernando Martínez (PSOE)
- Second Secretary: Olivia Delgado (PSOE)
- Third Secretary: Imanol Landa (EAJ)
- Fourth Secretary: Rafael Hernando (PP)

The 13th Senate of Spain was a meeting of the Senate of Spain, the upper house of the Spanish Cortes Generales, with the membership determined primarily by the results of the general election held on 28 April 2019. The Senate met for the first time on 21 May 2019 and was dissolved prematurely on 24 September 2019.

== Election ==
The 13th Spanish general election under the 1978 Constitution was held on 28 April 2019. It saw the Spanish Socialist Workers' Party (PSOE) become the largest party in the Senate for the first time since 1993, while securing its first overall majority since 1989.

| Alliance | Seats | +/− |
|---|---|---|
| PSOE | 123 | +81 |
| PP | 54 | –73 |
| ERC–Sob–ERPV | 11 | +1 |
| EAJ/PNV | 9 | +4 |
| Cs | 4 | +4 |
| JxCat–Junts | 2 | ±0 |
| UP–ECP–EC | 0 | –16 |
| Others/blanks | 5 | –1 |
| Total | 208 | ±0 |

== History ==
The new senate met for the first time on 21 May 2019 and elected Manuel Cruz (PSOE) as President of the Senate of Spain.

Other members of the Bureau of the Senate were also elected on 21 May 2019: Cristina Narbona (PSOE), First Vice-President; Pío García-Escudero (PP), Second Vice-President; Fernando Martínez (PSOE), First Secretary; Olivia Delgado (PSOE), Second Secretary; Imanol Landa (EAJ), Third Secretary; and Rafael Hernando (PP), Fourth Secretary.

President
| Candidate | | Votes |
|---|---|---|
| Manuel Cruz | PSOE | 140 |
| Ruth Goñi | Cs | 11 |
| Blank ballots | | 84 |
| Invalid ballots | | 15 |
| Total | | 250 |

Vice-President
| Candidate | | Votes |
|---|---|---|
| Cristina Narbona | PSOE | 142 |
| Pío García-Escudero | PP | 68 |
| Ruth Goñi | Cs | 10 |
| Blank ballots | | 16 |
| Invalid ballots | | 14 |
| Total | | 250 |

Secretary
| Candidate | | Votes |
|---|---|---|
| Fernando Martínez | PSOE | 102 |
| Olivia Delgado | PSOE | 99 |
| Imanol Landa | PNV | 97 |
| Rafael Hernando | PP | 70 |
| Salomé Pradas | PP | 66 |
| Ruth Goñi | Cs | 11 |
| Blank ballots | | 8 |
| Invalid ballots | | 13 |
| Total | | 466 |

In July 2019 caretaker Prime Minister Pedro Sánchez (POSE) failed to secure the necessary votes in the Congress of Deputies to form a government after the failure of coalition talks with UP–ECP. Sánchez announced on 17 September 2019 that an election would be held on 10 November 2019, the fourth in as many years. The 13th Cortes Generales was formally dissolved on 24 September 2019.

== Deaths, disqualifications, resignations, suspensions and regional legislature appointments ==
The 13th senate has seen the following deaths, disqualifications, resignations, suspensions and regional legislature appointments:

=== Elected senators ===
- 29 May 2019 – Jailed Catalan senator Raül Romeva (ERC–Sob), currently being tried on charges of rebellion, sedition, criminal organization and misuse of public funds in relation to the Catalan independence referendum and subsequent declaration of independence, is suspended from senate.
- 3 July 2019 – Francisco Valera (PSOE) resigned after being appointed vice president of the Albacete provincial council. He was replaced by María Victoria Leal (PSOE) on 4 July 2019.
- 16 July 2019 – José Valbuena (POSE) resigned after being appointed Minister of Ecological Transition of the Canary Islands. He was replaced by Pedro Meneses (PSOE) on 17 July 2019.
- 18 July 2019 – Yaiza Castilla (ASG) resigned after being appointed Minister of Tourism and Industry of the Canary Islands. She was replaced by Fabián Chinea (ASG) on 19 July 2019.
- 25 August 2019 – Antonio Amador (PSOE) resigned after being appointed communications delegate of the Teruel provincial council. He was replaced by Joaquín Noé (PSOE) on 26 August 2019.
- 8 September 2019 – Clara San Damián (PP) resigned after being appointed the regional government's delegate in Zamora. She was replaced by María Martín (PP) on 9 September 2019.

=== Appointed senators ===
- 8 May 2019 – José Montilla (PSOE) resigned.
- 11 June 2019 – Jesús Fermosel (PP), Jaime González (PP) and Juan Soler-Espiauba (PP) ceased being appointees of the Assembly of Madrid.
- 17 June 2019 – Idoia Villanueva (UP) resigned after being elected to the European Parliament.
- 19 June 2019 – Pedro Sanz (PP) ceased being the appointee of the Parliament of La Rioja.
- 26 June 2019 – Jesús Vázquez (PP), Elena Muñoz (PP) and José Manuel Sande (EM) appointed by the Parliament of Galicia.
- 27 June 2019 – Emilio Argüeso (Cs), Josefina Bueno (PSOE), Alberto Fabra (PP), Joan Lerma (PSOE) and Carles Mulet (Compromís) appointed by the Corts Valencianes.
- 1 July 2019 – Virginia Felipe (UP) resigned.
- 5 July 2019 – José Muñoz (PSOE) died.
- 10 July 2019 – Guillermo del Corral (PSOE) ceased being an appointee of the Parliament of Cantabria.
- 10 July 2019 – José Cepeda (PSOE), Tomás Marcos (Cs), Jacinto Morano (UP) and Encarnación Moya (PSOE) ceased being appointees of the Assembly of Madrid.
- 11 July 2019 – Francesc Antich (PSOE) and Toni Fuster (PP) ceased being appointees of the Parliament of the Balearic Islands.
- 11 July 2019 – José Miguel Fernández (PRC) appointed by the Parliament of Cantabria.
- 11 July 2019 – José Cepeda (PSOE) and Tomás Marcos (Cs) re-appointed by the Assembly of Madrid. Ana Camins (PP), David Erguido (PP), Pilar Llop (PSOE), Eduardo Rubiño (MM) and Carlota Santiago (Cs) appointed by the Assembly of Madrid.
- 12 July 2019 – José Vicente Marí (PP) and Vicenç Vidal (Més) appointed by the Parliament of the Balearic Islands.
- 18 July 2019 – Rafael Lemus (PSOE) and Diego Sánchez (PP) ceased being an appointees of the Assembly of Extremadura.
- 19 July 2019 – Francisco Bernabé (PP) and Francisco Oñate (PSOE) ceased being appointees of the Regional Assembly of Murcia.
- 19 July 2019 – Rafael Lemus (PSOE) re-appointed by the Assembly of Extremadura. José Antonio Monago (PP) appointed by the Assembly of Extremadura.
- 20 July 2019 – Lourdes Retuerto (PSOE) and Miguel Sánchez (Cs) appointed by the Regional Assembly of Murcia.
- 22 July 2019 – Nemesio de Lara (PSOE) ceased being an appointee of the Cortes of Castilla–La Mancha.
- 23 July 2019 – Ignacio Cosidó (PP), Antidio Fagúndez (PSOE) and Juan José Lucas (PP) ceased being appointees of the Cortes of Castile and León.
- 23 July 2019 – Carolina Agudo (PP), Jesús Fernández (PSOE) and María Teresa Fernández (PSOE) appointed by the Cortes of Castilla–La Mancha.
- 23 July 2019 – Raúl Díaz appointed by the Parliament of La Rioja.
- 24 July 2019 – Francisco Díaz (PSOE), María Teresa López (PSOE) and Javier Maroto (PP) appointed by the Cortes of Castile and León.
- 30 July 2019 – Julio Cruz (PSOE), María del Mar Julios (CCa) and Jorge Rodríguez (PP) ceased being appointees of the Parliament of the Canary Islands.
- 31 July 2019 – Asier Antona (PP), Fernando Clavijo (CCa) and Pedro Ramos (PSOE) appointed by the Parliament of the Canary Islands.
- 5 September 2019 – Marcelino Iglesias (PSOE) and Luisa Rudi ceased being an appointees of the Aragonese Corts.
- 6 September 2019 – Luisa Rudi (PP) re-appointed by the Aragonese Corts. Clemente Sánchez-Garnica (PAR) appointed by the Aragonese Corts.

== Members ==
| Name | Constituency | No. | Votes | Party | Alliance | Group | Took office | Left office | Notes |
|---|---|---|---|---|---|---|---|---|---|
| Patricia Abascal | Ibiza–Formentera | 1 | 17,598 | PSIB | PSOE | Socialists | 28 April 2019 | 23 September 2019 | |
| Pedro Acedo | Badajoz | 1 | 97,946 | PPE | PP | People's | 28 April 2019 | 23 September 2019 | |
| Sofía Acedo | Melilla | 2 | 7,487 | PP | PP | People's | 28 April 2019 | 23 September 2019 | |
| María Adrio | Pontevedra | 2 | 174,696 | PSdeG | PSOE | Socialists | 28 April 2019 | 23 September 2019 | |
| Ana Agudíez | Segovia | 1 | 26,792 | PSCyL | PSOE | Socialists | 28 April 2019 | 23 September 2019 | |
| Carolina Agudo | Castilla–La Mancha | – | Appointed | PPCM | PP | People's | 23 July 2019 | 23 September 2019 | |
| José Aguilar | Málaga | 3 | 228,652 | PSOE–A | PSOE | Socialists | 28 April 2019 | 23 September 2019 | |
| Nerea Ahedo | Biscay | 1 | 243,336 | EAJ/PNV | | Basque | 28 April 2019 | 23 September 2019 | |
| Antonio Alarcó | Tenerife | 1 | 82,448 | PPC | PP | People's | 28 April 2019 | 23 September 2019 | |
| Francisco Alcaraz | Andalusia | – | Appointed | Vox | | Mixed | 7 February 2019 (Note: Appointed by a regional legislature during a previous senate, continued to serve in 13th senate.) | 2 December 2019 (Note: Member of the permanent deputation.) | |
| Rosa Aldea | Palencia | 1 | 33,402 | PSCyL | PSOE | Socialists | 28 April 2019 | 2 December 2019 | |
| Francisco Alegre | Catalonia | – | Appointed | Cs | Cs | Citizens | 4 May 2018 | 23 September 2019 | |
| Jesús Alonso | Soria | 1 | 17,636 | PSCyL | PSOE | Socialists | 28 April 2019 | 23 September 2019 | |
| José Alonso | Valladolid | 1 | 99,115 | PPCyL | PP | People's | 28 April 2019 | 23 September 2019 | |
| Ana Alós | Huesca | 1 | 35,443 | PPA | PP | People's | 28 April 2019 | 2 December 2019 | |
| Antonio Amador | Teruel | 2 | 24,283 | PSA | PSOE | Socialists | 28 April 2019 | 25 August 2019 | Replaced by Joaquín Noé. |
| Francesc Antich | Balearics | – | Appointed | PSIB | PSOE | Socialists | 9 July 2015 | 11 July 2019 | |
| Asier Antona | Canaries | – | Appointed | PPC | PP | People's | 31 July 2019 | 2 December 2019 | |
| Francisco Aragón | Granada | 3 | 165,120 | PSOE–A | PSOE | Socialists | 28 April 2019 | 2 December 2019 | |
| María Arana | La Rioja | 3 | 53,938 | PSR | PSOE | Socialists | 28 April 2019 | 23 September 2019 | |
| Javier Arenas | Andalusia | – | Appointed | PPA | PP | People's | 7 February 2019 | 2 December 2019 | |
| Emilio Argüeso | Valencia | – | Appointed | Cs | Cs | Citizens | 27 June 2019 | 23 September 2019 | |
| María Arnáiz | Burgos | 2 | 63,306 | PSCyL | PSOE | Socialists | 28 April 2019 | 2 December 2019 | |
| Rosa Arza | Lugo | 2 | 66,345 | PPdeG | PP | People's | 28 April 2019 | 23 September 2019 | |
| José Asensi | Alicante | 1 | 258,850 | PSPV | PSOE | Socialists | 28 April 2019 | 23 September 2019 | |
| Miguel Aubà | Tarragona | 1 | 129,714 | Indep. | ERC–Sob | ERC–EHB (Note: Republican Left of Catalonia–EH Bildu) | 28 April 2019 | 23 September 2019 | |
| Vicente Azpitarte | Granada | 1 | 120,517 | PPA | PP | People's | 28 April 2019 | 23 September 2019 | |
| Sara Bailac | Lleida | 1 | 86,371 | ERC | ERC–Sob | ERC–EHB | 28 April 2019 | 23 September 2019 | |
| Marcial Barba | Valladolid | 3 | 90,862 | PSCyL | PSOE | Socialists | 28 April 2019 | 23 September 2019 | |
| José Barreiro | Lugo | 1 | 69,577 | PPdeG | PP | People's | 28 April 2019 | 2 December 2019 | |
| Julio Barros | A Coruña | 3 | 188,059 | PSdeG | PSOE | Socialists | 28 April 2019 | 23 September 2019 | |
| Mercedes Berenguer | Valencia | 2 | 386,456 | PSPV | PSOE | Socialists | 28 April 2019 | 2 December 2019 | |
| Francisco Bernabé | Murcia | – | Appointed | PPRM | PP | People's | 19 July 2018 | 19 July 2019 | |
| Idurre Bideguren | Basque Country | – | Appointed | | EH Bildu | ERC–EHB | 31 May 2019 | 23 September 2019 | |
| Jokin Bildarratz | Basque Country | – | Appointed | EAJ/PNV | | Basque | 15 December 2016 | 2 December 2019 | |
| Francisco Blanco | Asturias | 1 | 209,215 | FSA | PSOE | Socialists | 28 April 2019 | 23 September 2019 | |
| Manuel Blasco | Teruel | 1 | 21,751 | PPA | PP | People's | 28 April 2019 | 2 December 2019 | |
| José Bolaños | Ciudad Real | 3 | 96,689 | PSCM | PSOE | Socialists | 28 April 2019 | 23 September 2019 | |
| Cosme Bonet | Mallorca | 1 | 107,619 | PSIB | PSOE | Socialists | 28 April 2019 | 2 December 2019 | |
| María Borao | Teruel | 3 | 23,492 | PSA | PSOE | Socialists | 28 April 2019 | 2 December 2019 | |
| Josefina Bueno | Valencia | – | Appointed | PSPV | PSOE | Socialists | 27 June 2019 | 23 September 2019 | |
| Marisa Bustinduy | Andalusia | – | Appointed | PSOE–A | PSOE | Socialists | 7 February 2019 | 2 December 2019 | |
| Miquel Caminal | Lleida | 2 | 75,043 | ERC | ERC–Sob | ERC–EHB | 28 April 2019 | 23 September 2019 | |
| Ana Camins | Madrid | – | Appointed | PPCM | PP | People's | 11 July 2019 | 23 September 2019 | |
| Esther Carmona | El Hierro | 1 | 2,328 | PSC | PSOE | Socialists | 28 April 2019 | 2 December 2019 | |
| Jesús Caro | Ávila | 1 | 26,529 | PSCyL | PSOE | Socialists | 28 April 2019 | 23 September 2019 | |
| Fran Carrillo | Andalusia | – | Appointed | Cs | Cs | Citizens | 7 February 2019 | 23 September 2019 | |
| Laura Castel | Tarragona | 2 | 117,324 | Indep. | ERC–Sob | ERC–EHB | 28 April 2019 | 23 September 2019 | |
| Santiago Castellà | Tarragona | 1 | 85,195 | PSC | PSOE | Socialists | 28 April 2019 | 23 September 2019 | |
| Xavier Castellana | Lleida | 3 | 68,865 | ERC | ERC–Sob | ERC–EHB | 28 April 2019 | 23 September 2019 | |
| Yaiza Castilla | La Gomera | 1 | 5,611 | ASG | | Mixed | 28 April 2019 | 18 July 2019 | Replaced by Fabián Chinea. |
| María Castro | Cádiz | 1 | 208,471 | PSOE–A | PSOE | Left (Note: Confederation of the Left: Adelante Andalucía–Més per Mallorca–Coalició Compromís–Más Madrid–Catalunya en Comú–Podem) | 28 April 2019 | 2 December 2019 | |
| Alberto Catalán | Navarre | 3 | 107,796 | UPN | NA+ | Mixed | 28 April 2019 | 2 December 2019 | |
| José Cepeda | Madrid | – | Appointed | PSOE-M | PSOE | Socialists | 9 July 2015 | 10 July 2019 | |
| José Cepeda | Madrid | – | Appointed | PSOE–M | PSOE | Socialists | 11 July 2019 (Note: Re-appointed by a regional legislature.) | 23 September 2019 | |
| Daniel Chenlo | Pontevedra | 3 | 164,450 | PSdeG | PSOE | Socialists | 28 April 2019 | 23 September 2019 | |
| Fabián Chinea | La Gomera | – | – | ASG | | Mixed | 19 July 2019 | 23 September 2019 | Replaces Yaiza Castilla. |
| Fernando Clavijo | Canaries | – | Appointed | CCa | CCa–PNC | Nationalists | 31 July 2019 | 2 December 2019 | |
| Josep Cleries | Catalonia | – | Appointed | PDeCAT | JxCat | Nationalists | 4 May 2018 | 2 December 2019 | |
| Mirella Cortès | Catalonia | – | Appointed | ERC | ERC–Sob | ERC–EHB | 4 May 2018 | 23 September 2019 | |
| Antonio Cosculluela | Huesca | 1 | 42,088 | PSA | PSOE | Socialists | 28 April 2019 | 23 September 2019 | |
| Ignacio Cosidó | Castile and León | – | Appointed | PPCyL | PP | People's | 14 December 2016 | 23 July 2019 | |
| Julio Cruz | Canaries | – | Appointed | PSC | PSOE | Socialists | 21 July 2015 | 30 July 2019 | |
| Manuel Cruz | Barcelona | 1 | 741,978 | PSC | PSOE | Socialists | 28 April 2019 | 2 December 2019 | President. |
| Miguel Dalmau | Zaragoza | 1 | 172,361 | PSA | PSOE | Socialists | 28 April 2019 | 23 September 2019 | |
| Bienvenido de Arriba | Salamanca | 1 | 72,983 | PPCyL | PP | People's | 28 April 2019 | 23 September 2019 | |
| Nemesio de Lara | Castilla–La Mancha | – | Appointed | PSCM | PSOE | Socialists | 30 July 2015 | 22 July 2019 | |
| Esther del Brío | Salamanca | 3 | 62,021 | PPCyL | PP | People's | 28 April 2019 | 23 September 2019 | |
| Guillermo del Corral | Cantabria | – | Appointed | PSC | PSOE | Socialists | 15 July 2015 | 10 July 2019 | |
| María Delgado | Soria | 2 | 15,282 | PSCyL | PSOE | Socialists | 28 April 2019 | 23 September 2019 | |
| Olivia Delgado | Tenerife | 1 | 125,347 | PSC | PSOE | Socialists | 28 April 2019 | 2 December 2019 | Second Secretary. |
| Javier de Lucas | Valencia | 1 | 406,479 | Indep. | PSOE | Socialists | 28 April 2019 | 23 September 2019 | |
| María de Pablo | La Rioja | 1 | 58,367 | PSR | PSOE | Socialists | 28 April 2019 | 2 December 2019 | |
| Fernando de Rosa | Valencia | 1 | 330,696 | PPCV | PP | People's | 28 April 2019 | 2 December 2019 | |
| Francisco Díaz | Castile and León | – | Appointed | PSCyL | PSOE | Socialists | 24 July 2019 | 23 September 2019 | |
| Raúl Díaz | La Rioja | – | Appointed | PSR | PSOE | Socialists | 23 July 2019 | 23 September 2019 | |
| Elena Diego | Salamanca | 1 | 60,516 | PSCyL | PSOE | Socialists | 28 April 2019 | 23 September 2019 | |
| Ana Edo | Castellón | 2 | 91,802 | PSPV | PSOE | Socialists | 28 April 2019 | 23 September 2019 | |
| Gorka Elejabarrieta | Gipuzkoa | 1 | 99,215 | | EH Bildu | ERC–EHB | 28 April 2019 | 2 December 2019 | |
| David Erguido | Madrid | – | Appointed | PPCM | PP | People's | 11 July 2019 | 2 December 2019 | |
| Manuel Escarda | Valladolid | 1 | 99,609 | PSCyL | PSOE | Socialists | 28 April 2019 | 23 September 2019 | |
| Alfonso Escudero | Cuenca | 2 | 41,660 | PSCM | PSOE | Socialists | 28 April 2019 | 23 September 2019 | |
| Baldomero Espinosa | Badajoz | 2 | 151,296 | PSOE–E | PSOE | Socialists | 28 April 2019 | 23 September 2019 | |
| Rafael Esteban | Guadalajara | 1 | 43,448 | PSCM | PSOE | Socialists | 28 April 2019 | 23 September 2019 | |
| María Etxano | Biscay | 2 | 233,468 | EAJ/PNV | | Basque | 28 April 2019 | 23 September 2019 | |
| Alberto Fabra | Valencia | – | Appointed | PPCV | PP | People's | 27 June 2019 | 23 September 2019 | |
| Antidio Fagúndez | Castile and León | – | Appointed | PSCyL | PSOE | Socialists | 12 December 2018 | 23 July 2019 | |
| Francisco Fajardo | Lanzarote | 1 | 15,910 | PSC | PSOE | Socialists | 28 April 2019 | 23 September 2019 | |
| Virginia Felipe | Castilla–La Mancha | – | Appointed | Podemos | UP | Left | 15 October 2015 | 1 July 2019 | |
| Jesús Fermosel | Madrid | – | Appointed | PPCM | PP | People's | 9 July 2015 | 11 June 2019 | |
| Francisco Fernández | Ourense | 3 | 65,815 | PPdeG | PP | People's | 28 April 2019 | 23 September 2019 | |
| Jesús Fernández | Castilla–La Mancha | – | Appointed | PSCM | PSOE | Socialists | 23 July 2019 | 23 September 2019 | |
| José Fernández | Zamora | 1 | 35,430 | PSCyL | PSOE | Socialists | 28 April 2019 | 23 September 2019 | |
| José Miguel Fernández | Cantabria | – | Appointed | PRC | | Mixed | 11 July 2019 | 23 September 2019 | |
| Manuel Fernández | Jaén | 3 | 143,647 | PSOE–A | PSOE | Socialists | 28 April 2019 | 23 September 2019 | |
| María Fernández | Asturias | 2 | 205,332 | FSA | PSOE | Socialists | 28 April 2019 | 2 December 2019 | |
| María Fernández | Cantabria | 1 | 90,928 | PSC | PSOE | Socialists | 28 April 2019 | 2 December 2019 | |
| María Teresa Fernández | Castilla–La Mancha | – | Appointed | PSCM | PSOE | Socialists | 23 July 2019 | 23 September 2019 | |
| Antonio Ferrer | Madrid | 2 | 979,150 | PSOE–M | PSOE | Socialists | 28 April 2019 | 2 December 2019 | |
| Miguel Fidalgo | Pontevedra | 1 | 154,869 | PPdeG | PP | People's | 28 April 2019 | 23 September 2019 | |
| Carlos Floriano | Cáceres | 1 | 65,335 | PPE | PP | People's | 28 April 2019 | 2 December 2019 | |
| Juan Francisco | Ourense | 1 | 60,210 | PSdeG | PSOE | Socialists | 28 April 2019 | 23 September 2019 | |
| Toni Fuster | Balearics | – | Appointed | PPIB | PP | People's | 20 February 2019 | 11 July 2019 | |
| Sara Galván | Valladolid | 2 | 96,626 | PSCyL | PSOE | Socialists | 28 April 2019 | 23 September 2019 | |
| Gustavi García | Cantabria | 2 | 86,215 | PSC | PSOE | Socialists | 28 April 2019 | 23 September 2019 | |
| José García | Asturias | 1 | 140,683 | PPA | PP | People's | 28 April 2019 | 23 September 2019 | |
| Julio García | Guadalajara | 3 | 39,677 | PSCM | PSOE | Socialists | 28 April 2019 | 23 September 2019 | |
| María García | Granada | 2 | 172,141 | PSOE–A | PSOE | Socialists | 28 April 2019 | 23 September 2019 | |
| Maria Garcial | Menorca | 1 | 11,856 | PSIB | PSOE | Socialists | 28 April 2019 | 23 September 2019 | |
| Pío García-Escudero | Madrid | 1 | 1,009,911 | PPCM | PP | People's | 28 April 2019 | 2 December 2019 | Second Vice-President. |
| Javier Garcinuño | Cáceres | 3 | 86,582 | PSOE–E | PSOE | Socialists | 28 April 2019 | 23 September 2019 | |
| María Garmendia | Gipuzkoa | 2 | 117,378 | EAJ/PNV | | Basque | 28 April 2019 | 23 September 2019 | |
| Andrés Gil | Burgos | 1 | 65,703 | PSCyL | PSOE | Socialists | 28 April 2019 | 2 December 2019 | |
| Juan Gilabert | Seville | 3 | 372,099 | PSOE–A | PSOE | Socialists | 28 April 2019 | 23 September 2019 | |
| Carlos Giménez | Alicante | 3 | 235,819 | PSPV | PSOE | Socialists | 28 April 2019 | 23 September 2019 | |
| María Godoy | Badajoz | 3 | 150,268 | PSOE–E | PSOE | Socialists | 28 April 2019 | 23 September 2019 | |
| Esperanza Gómez | Andalusia | – | Appointed | Podemos | AA | Left | 7 February 2019 | 23 September 2019 | |
| María Gómez | Ceuta | 1 | 12,654 | PSOE | PSOE | Socialists | 28 April 2019 | 23 September 2019 | |
| Fernando Goñi | Asturias | – | Appointed | PPA | PP | People's | 25 September 2015 | 23 September 2019 | |
| Ruth Goñi | Navarre | 1 | 110,323 | Cs | NA+ | Citizens | 28 April 2019 | 2 December 2019 | |
| Ana González | La Rioja | 1 | 53,215 | PPR | PP | People's | 28 April 2019 | 23 September 2019 | |
| Jaime González | Madrid | – | Appointed | PPCM | PP | People's | 5 October 2017 | 11 June 2019 | |
| Jesús González | Huelva | 3 | 87,696 | PSOE–A | PSOE | Socialists | 28 April 2019 | 23 September 2019 | |
| Josefa González | Huelva | 2 | 91,185 | PSOE–A | PSOE | Socialists | 28 April 2019 | 23 September 2019 | |
| Sebastián González | Ávila | 2 | 31,751 | PPCyL | PP | People's | 28 April 2019 | 2 December 2019 | |
| Josep Grau | Castellón | 3 | 87,258 | PSPV | PSOE | Socialists | 28 April 2019 | 23 September 2019 | |
| José Gregorio | Toledo | 1 | 110,599 | PPCM | PP | People's | 28 April 2019 | 23 September 2019 | |
| Antonio Gutiérrez | Seville | 1 | 400,414 | PSOE–A | PSOE | Socialists | 28 April 2019 | 2 December 2019 | |
| Miguel Heredia | Málaga | 1 | 250,230 | PSOE–A | PSOE | Socialists | 28 April 2019 | 23 September 2019 | |
| María Hernández | Seville | 2 | 388,963 | PSOE–A | PSOE | Socialists | 28 April 2019 | 23 September 2019 | |
| Paloma Hernández | Fuerteventura | 1 | 9,449 | PSC | PSOE | Socialists | 28 April 2019 | 23 September 2019 | |
| Susana Hernández | Murcia | 2 | 186,757 | PSRM | PSOE | Socialists | 28 April 2019 | 2 December 2019 | |
| Rafael Hernando | Almería | 1 | 85,421 | PPA | PP | People's | 28 April 2019 | 2 December 2019 | Fourth Secretary. |
| Mar Hormigo | Andalusia | – | Appointed | Cs | Cs | Citizens | 7 February 2019 | 23 September 2019 | |
| Amaro Huelva | Huelva | 1 | 95,482 | PSOE–A | PSOE | Socialists | 28 April 2019 | 23 September 2019 | |
| Marcelino Iglesias | Aragon | – | Appointed | PSA | PSOE | Socialists | 28 July 2015 | 5 September 2019 | |
| Juan Imbroda | Melilla | 1 | 9,109 | PP | PP | People's | 28 April 2019 | 23 September 2019 | |
| María del Mar Julios | Canaries | – | Appointed | CCa | CCa–PNC | Nationalists | 21 July 2015 | 30 July 2019 | |
| Francisco Lacalle | Burgos | 1 | 63,503 | PPCyL | PP | People's | 28 April 2019 | 23 September 2019 | |
| Imanol Landa | Biscay | 3 | 231,424 | EAJ/PNV | | Basque | 28 April 2019 | 2 December 2019 | Third Secretary. |
| Fernando Lastra | Asturias | 3 | 198,863 | FSA | PSOE | Socialists | 28 April 2019 | 23 September 2019 | |
| José Latorre | Jaén | 2 | 145,824 | PSOE–A | PSOE | Socialists | 28 April 2019 | 23 September 2019 | |
| María Victoria Leal | Albacete | – | – | PSCM | PSOE | Socialists | 4 July 2019 | 23 September 2019 | Replaces Francisco Valera. |
| Rafael Lemus | Extremadura | – | Appointed | PSOE-E | PSOE | Socialists | 21 May 2015 | 18 July 2019 | |
| Rafael Lemus | Extremadura | – | Appointed | PSOE–E | PSOE | Socialists | 19 July 2019 | 2 December 2019 | |
| Joan Lerma | Valencia | – | Appointed | PSPV | PSOE | Socialists | 27 June 2019 | 2 December 2019 | |
| Carmen Leyte | Ourense | 2 | 67,082 | PPdeG | PP | People's | 28 April 2019 | 23 September 2019 | |
| Julia Liberal | Álava | 1 | 39,168 | PSE–EE | PSOE | Socialists | 28 April 2019 | 23 September 2019 | |
| Pilar Liébana | Madrid | | | Cs | Cs | Citizens | 28 April 2019 | 23 September 2019 | |
| Pilar Llop | Madrid | – | Appointed | PSOE–M | PSOE | Socialists | 11 July 2019 | 23 September 2019 | |
| Joaquín López | Murcia | 1 | 192,296 | PSRM | PSOE | Socialists | 28 April 2019 | 23 September 2019 | |
| María López | Cuenca | 3 | 40,746 | PSCM | PSOE | Socialists | 28 April 2019 | 23 September 2019 | |
| María Teresa López | Castile and León | – | Appointed | PSCyL | PSOE | Socialists | 24 July 2019 | 23 September 2019 | |
| Miguel Lorenzo | A Coruña | 1 | 185,429 | PPdeG | PP | People's | 28 April 2019 | 23 September 2019 | |
| Juan José Lucas | Castile and León | – | Appointed | PPCyL | PP | People's | 20 July 2015 | 23 July 2019 | |
| Jesús Lucía | Segovia | 2 | 24,761 | PSCyL | PSOE | Socialists | 28 April 2019 | 23 September 2019 | |
| María Luna | Córdoba | 1 | 162,475 | PSOE–A | PSOE | Socialists | 28 April 2019 | 2 December 2019 | |
| María Macías | Badajoz | 1 | 157,683 | PSOE–E | PSOE | Socialists | 28 April 2019 | 23 September 2019 | |
| Antonio Magdalena | Navarre | 1 | 107,621 | PSN | PSOE | Socialists | 28 April 2019 | 2 December 2019 | |
| Constantino Marcos | León | 3 | 90,041 | PSCyL | PSOE | Socialists | 28 April 2019 | 23 September 2019 | |
| Tomás Marcos | Madrid | – | Appointed | Cs | Cs | Citizens | 9 July 2015 | 10 July 2019 | |
| Tomás Marcos | Madrid | – | Appointed | Cs | Cs | Citizens | 11 July 2019 | 23 September 2019 | |
| José Vicente Marí | Balearics | – | Appointed | PPIB | PP | People's | 12 July 2019 | 23 September 2019 | |
| Javier Maroto | Castile and León | – | Appointed | PPCyL | PP | People's | 24 July 2019 | 2 December 2019 | |
| Francisco Márquez | Jaén | 1 | 95,261 | PPA | PP | People's | 28 April 2019 | 23 September 2019 | |
| Jordi Martí | Girona | 1 | 132,212 | ERC | ERC–Sob | ERC–EHB | 28 April 2019 | 2 December 2019 | |
| Estefanía Martín | Málaga | 2 | 241,824 | PSOE–A | PSOE | Socialists | 28 April 2019 | 23 September 2019 | |
| Jesús Martín | Ciudad Real | 1 | 103,540 | PSCM | PSOE | Socialists | 28 April 2019 | 2 December 2019 | |
| Juan Martín | Ávila | 1 | 36,519 | PPCyL | PP | People's | 28 April 2019 | 23 September 2019 | |
| María Martín | Zamora | – | – | PPCyL | PP | People's | 9 September 2019 | 23 September 2019 | Replaces Clara San Damián. |
| Ana Martínez | Alicante | 2 | 250,548 | PSPV | PSOE | Socialists | 28 April 2019 | 23 September 2019 | |
| Fernando Martínez | Almería | 1 | 96,928 | PSOE–A | PSOE | Socialists | 28 April 2019 | 2 December 2019 | First Secretary. |
| Gerardo Martínez | Soria | 2 | 14,550 | PPCyL | PP | People's | 28 April 2019 | 23 September 2019 | |
| Jorge Martínez | Palencia | 2 | 31,579 | PPCyL | PP | People's | 28 April 2019 | 23 September 2019 | |
| María Martínez | Zamora | 1 | 33,740 | PSCyL | PSOE | Socialists | 28 April 2019 | 23 September 2019 | |
| Fernando Martínez-Maíllo | Zamora | 1 | 36,180 | PPCyL | PP | People's | 28 April 2019 | 2 December 2019 | |
| Jami Matamala | Girona | 1 | 105,011 | PDeCAT | JxCat | Nationalists | 28 April 2019 | 23 September 2019 | Aligned to CNxR. |
| Sergio Matos | La Palma | 1 | 12,161 | PSC | PSOE | Socialists | 28 April 2019 | 23 September 2019 | |
| Ángel Mayo | Seville | 1 | 216,981 | Cs | Cs | Citizens | 28 April 2019 | 23 September 2019 | |
| Rodrigo Mediavilla | Palencia | 1 | 34,866 | PPCyL | PP | People's | 28 April 2019 | 23 September 2019 | |
| Juan Medina | Álava | 2 | 40,122 | EAJ/PNV | | Basque | 28 April 2019 | 23 September 2019 | |
| Pedro Meneses | Tenerife | – | – | PSC | PSOE | Socialists | 17 July 2019 | 23 September 2019 | Replaces José Valbuena. |
| Carmen Mínguez | Ciudad Real | 2 | 100,278 | PSCM | PSOE | Socialists | 28 April 2019 | 23 September 2019 | |
| Manuel Miranda | Albacete | 3 | 71,221 | PSCM | PSOE | Socialists | 28 April 2019 | 23 September 2019 | |
| César Mogo | Lugo | 1 | 62,942 | PSdeG | PSOE | Socialists | 28 April 2019 | 2 December 2019 | |
| Hamed Mohamed | Ceuta | 2 | 12,656 | PSOE | PSOE | Socialists | 28 April 2019 | 2 December 2019 | |
| Susanna Moll | Mallorca | 2 | 102,887 | PSIB | PSOE | Socialists | 28 April 2019 | 23 September 2019 | |
| José Antonio Monago | Extremadura | – | Appointed | PPE | PP | People's | 19 July 2019 | 23 September 2019 | |
| Pedro Montalvo | La Rioja | 2 | 55,382 | PSR | PSOE | Socialists | 28 April 2019 | 23 September 2019 | |
| José Montilla | Catalonia | – | Appointed | PSC | PSOE | Socialists | 4 May 2018 | 8 May 2019 | |
| Ramón Morales | Gran Canaria | 1 | 124,876 | PSC | PSOE | Socialists | 28 April 2019 | 2 December 2019 | |
| María Morán | León | 2 | 94,212 | PSCyL | PSOE | Socialists | 28 April 2019 | 23 September 2019 | |
| Jacinto Morano | Madrid | – | Appointed | Podemos | UP | Left | 8 February 2019 | 10 July 2019 | |
| María Moreno | Cáceres | 2 | 90,056 | PSOE–E | PSOE | Socialists | 28 April 2019 | 23 September 2019 | |
| Alfonso Moscoso | Cádiz | 2 | 193,227 | PSOE–A | PSOE | Socialists | 28 April 2019 | 23 September 2019 | |
| Encarnación Moya | Madrid | – | Appointed | PSOE–M | PSOE | Socialists | 9 July 2015 | 10 July 2019 | |
| Carles Mulet | Valencia | – | Appointed | IdPV | Compromís | Left | 27 June 2019 | 23 September 2019 | |
| Alfonso Muñoz | Córdoba | 2 | 153,632 | PSOE–A | PSOE | Socialists | 28 April 2019 | 23 September 2019 | |
| Ángeles Muñoz | Málaga | 1 | 183,823 | PPA | PP | People's | 28 April 2019 | 23 September 2019 | |
| Elena Muñoz | Galicia | – | Appointed | PPdeG | PP | People's | 26 June 2019 | 23 September 2019 | |
| José Muñoz | Andalusia | – | Appointed | PSOE–A | PSOE | Socialists | 7 February 2019 | 5 July 2019 | |
| Montserrat Muro | Toledo | 2 | 121,997 | PSCM | PSOE | Socialists | 28 April 2019 | 2 December 2019 | |
| Miguel Nacarino | Cáceres | 1 | 91,682 | PSOE–E | PSOE | Socialists | 28 April 2019 | 2 December 2019 | |
| Cristina Narbona | Madrid | 1 | 1,090,551 | PSOE–M | PSOE | Socialists | 28 April 2019 | 2 December 2019 | First Vice-President. |
| Micaela Navarro | Jaén | 1 | 152,227 | PSOE–A | PSOE | Socialists | 28 April 2019 | 23 September 2019 | |
| Joaquín Noé | Teruel | – | – | PSA | PSOE | Socialists | 26 August 2019 | 23 September 2019 | Replaces Antonio Amador. |
| Txema Oleaga | Biscay | 1 | 133,292 | PSE–EE | PSOE | Socialists | 28 April 2019 | 2 December 2019 | |
| Francisco Oñate | Murcia | – | Appointed | PSRM | PSOE | Socialists | 13 July 2015 | 19 July 2019 | |
| Félix Ortega | Toledo | 1 | 124,631 | PSCM | PSOE | Socialists | 28 April 2019 | 23 September 2019 | |
| Almuden Otaola | Álava | 1 | 43,490 | EAJ/PNV | | Basque | 28 April 2019 | 23 September 2019 | |
| Gonzalo Palacín | Huesca | 3 | 38,257 | PSA | PSOE | Socialists | 28 April 2019 | 23 September 2019 | |
| Marta Pascal | Catalonia | – | Appointed | PDeCAT | JxCat | Nationalists | 4 May 2018 | 23 September 2019 | |
| Rosa Peral | Álava | 3 | 38,946 | EAJ/PNV | | Basque | 28 April 2019 | 23 September 2019 | |
| Carlos Pérez | Cádiz | 1 | 140,227 | Cs | Cs | Citizens | 28 April 2019 | 23 September 2019 | |
| Elisenda Pérez | Girona | 2 | 112,723 | ERC | ERC–Sob | ERC–EHB | 28 April 2019 | 23 September 2019 | |
| Juan Pérez | Almería | 3 | 91,413 | PSOE–A | PSOE | Socialists | 28 April 2019 | 23 September 2019 | |
| Bernat Picornell | Catalonia | – | Appointed | ERC | ERC–Sob | ERC–EHB | 4 May 2018 | 2 December 2019 | |
| Inés Plaza | Almería | 2 | 91,956 | PSOE–A | PSOE | Socialists | 28 April 2019 | 23 September 2019 | |
| Modesto Pose | Pontevedra | 1 | 180,061 | PSdeG | PSOE | Socialists | 28 April 2019 | 2 December 2019 | |
| Salomé Pradas | Castellón | 1 | 77,507 | PPCV | PP | People's | 28 April 2019 | 2 December 2019 | |
| Fernando Priego | Córdoba | 1 | 113,953 | PPA | PP | People's | 28 April 2019 | 23 September 2019 | |
| Laura Prieto | Soria | 1 | 15,977 | PPCyL | PP | People's | 28 April 2019 | 23 September 2019 | |
| Javier Puente | Cantabria | 1 | 92,080 | PPC | PP | People's | 28 April 2019 | 23 September 2019 | |
| Josep Quintana | Girona | 3 | 98,008 | ERC | ERC–Sob | ERC–EHB | 28 April 2019 | 23 September 2019 | |
| Carmen Quintanilla | Ciudad Real | 1 | 86,738 | PPCM | PP | People's | 28 April 2019 | 23 September 2019 | |
| María Rábago | Cantabria | 3 | 84,792 | PSC | PSOE | Socialists | 28 April 2019 | 23 September 2019 | |
| Artemi Rallo | Castellón | 1 | 94,072 | PSPV | PSOE | Socialists | 28 April 2019 | 2 December 2019 | |
| Pedro Ramos | Canaries | – | Appointed | PSC | PSOE | Socialists | 31 July 2019 | 23 September 2019 | |
| Sergio Ramos | Gran Canaria | 1 | 83,357 | PPC | PP | People's | 28 April 2019 | 23 September 2019 | |
| Lourdes Retuerto | Murcia | – | Appointed | PSRM | PSOE | Socialists | 20 July 2019 | 23 September 2019 | |
| Mayte Rivero | Lleida | 1 | 53,679 | PDeCAT | JxCat | Nationalists | 28 April 2019 | 23 September 2019 | Aligned to CNxR. |
| Gonzalo Robles | Salamanca | 2 | 62,940 | PPCyL | PP | People's | 28 April 2019 | 2 December 2019 | |
| Jorge Rodríguez | Canaries | – | Appointed | PPC | PP | People's | 21 December 2016 | 30 July 2019 | |
| Patricia Rodríguez | Ávila | 3 | 32,358 | PPCyL | PP | People's | 28 April 2019 | 23 September 2019 | |
| Pedro Rodríguez | Valencia | 3 | 366,141 | Indep. | PSOE | Socialists | 28 April 2019 | 23 September 2019 | |
| Tontxu Rodríguez | Basque Country | – | Appointed | PSE–EE | PSOE | Socialists | 15 December 2016 | 2 December 2019 | |
| Donelia Roldán | Albacete | 2 | 74,116 | PSCM | PSOE | Socialists | 28 April 2019 | 23 September 2019 | |
| Lorena Roldán | Catalonia | – | Appointed | Cs | Cs | Citizens | 4 May 2018 | 2 December 2019 | |
| Antonio Román | Guadalajara | 1 | 38,399 | PPCM | PP | People's | 28 April 2019 | 2 December 2019 | |
| Carmelo Romero | Huelva | 1 | 61,032 | PPA | PP | People's | 28 April 2019 | 23 September 2019 | |
| Raül Romeva | Barcelona | 1 | 944,201 | ERC | ERC–Sob | Mixed | 28 April 2019 | 23 September 2019 | Suspended from 29 May 2019. |
| Eduardo Rubiño | Madrid | – | Appointed | MM | | Left | 11 July 2019 | 23 September 2019 | |
| Luisa Rudi | Aragon | – | Appointed | PPA | PP | People's | 28 July 2015 | 5 September 2019 | |
| Luisa Rudi | Aragon | – | Appointed | PPA | PP | People's | 6 September 2019 | 23 September 2019 | |
| Josep Rufà | Tarragona | 3 | 106,669 | ERC | ERC–Sob | ERC–EHB | 28 April 2019 | 23 September 2019 | |
| Víctor Ruiz | Zaragoza | 3 | 158,256 | PSA | PSOE | Socialists | 28 April 2019 | 2 December 2019 | |
| Teresa Ruiz-Sillero | Andalusia | – | Appointed | PPA | PP | People's | 7 February 2019 | 23 September 2019 | |
| Pablo Ruz | Alicante | 1 | 226,330 | PPCV | PP | People's | 28 April 2019 | 23 September 2019 | |
| Amelia Salanueva | Navarre | 2 | 107,186 | PPN | NA+ | People's | 28 April 2019 | 2 December 2019 | |
| María Salom | Mallorca | 1 | 75,485 | PPIB | PP | People's | 28 April 2019 | 2 December 2019 | |
| Diego Sánchez | Extremadura | – | Appointed | PPE | PP | People's | 21 July 2015 | 18 July 2019 | |
| Miguel Sánchez | Murcia | – | Appointed | Cs | Cs | Citizens | 20 July 2019 | 23 September 2019 | |
| Clemente Sánchez-Garnica | Aragon | – | Appointed | PAR | | Mixed | 6 September 2019 | 23 September 2019 | |
| Clara San Damián | Zamora | 3 | 34,177 | PPCyL | PP | People's | 28 April 2019 | 8 September 2019 | Replaced by María Martín. |
| José Manuel Sande | Galicia | – | Appointed | MA | EM | Left | 26 June 2019 | 23 September 2019 | |
| Saturnina Santana | Gran Canaria | 2 | 117,970 | PSC | PSOE | Socialists | 28 April 2019 | 23 September 2019 | |
| Carlota Santiago | Madrid | – | Appointed | Cs | Cs | Citizens | 11 July 2019 | 23 September 2019 | |
| Eduardo Santiago | Palencia | 2 | 31,825 | PSCyL | PSOE | Socialists | 28 April 2019 | 23 September 2019 | |
| Javier Santiago | León | 1 | 82,515 | PPCyL | PP | People's | 28 April 2019 | 23 September 2019 | |
| Juan Sanz | Segovia | 2 | 25,453 | PPCyL | PP | People's | 28 April 2019 | 23 September 2019 | |
| Paloma Sanz | Segovia | 1 | 30,362 | PPCyL | PP | People's | 28 April 2019 | 2 December 2019 | |
| Pedro Sanz | La Rioja | – | Appointed | PPR | PP | People's | 8 July 2015 | 19 June 2019 | |
| Domingo Segado | Murcia | 2 | 182,659 | PPRM | PP | People's | 28 April 2019 | 23 September 2019 | |
| Antonio Serrano | Albacete | 1 | 67,969 | PPCM | PP | People's | 28 April 2019 | 23 September 2019 | |
| María Serrano | Córdoba | 3 | 152,045 | PSOE–A | PSOE | Socialists | 28 April 2019 | 23 September 2019 | |
| Riansares Serrano | Guadalajara | 2 | 41,229 | PSCM | PSOE | Socialists | 28 April 2019 | 2 December 2019 | |
| Rosa Serrano | Huesca | 2 | 39,555 | PSA | PSOE | Socialists | 28 April 2019 | 23 September 2019 | |
| José Sierra | Burgos | 3 | 58,763 | PSCyL | PSOE | Socialists | 28 April 2019 | 23 September 2019 | |
| Juan Soler-Espiauba | Madrid | – | Appointed | PPCM | PP | People's | 9 July 2015 | 11 June 2019 | |
| Ana María Surra | Barcelona | 2 | 687,671 | ERC | ERC–Sob | ERC–EHB | 28 April 2019 | 23 September 2019 | |
| Obdulia Taboadela | A Coruña | 2 | 197,052 | PSdeG | PSOE | Socialists | 28 April 2019 | 2 December 2019 | |
| José Tofiño | Toledo | 3 | 119,081 | PSCM | PSOE | Socialists | 28 April 2019 | 23 September 2019 | |
| Violante Tomás | Murcia | 1 | 208,770 | PPRM | PP | People's | 28 April 2019 | 2 December 2019 | |
| Carmen Torralba | Cuenca | 1 | 43,096 | PSCM | PSOE | Socialists | 28 April 2019 | 23 September 2019 | |
| Elia Tortolero | Barcelona | 2 | 697,906 | PSC | PSOE | Socialists | 28 April 2019 | 2 December 2019 | |
| José Tortosa | Cuenca | 1 | 41,298 | PPCM | PP | People's | 28 April 2019 | 23 September 2019 | |
| Luke Uribe-Etxebarria | Gipuzkoa | 3 | 115,159 | EAJ/PNV | | Nationalists | 28 April 2019 | 23 September 2019 | |
| José Valbuena | Tenerife | 2 | 116,653 | PSC | PSOE | Left | 28 April 2019 | 16 July 2019 | Replaced by Pedro Meneses. |
| Francisco Valera | Albacete | 1 | 77,198 | PSCM | PSOE | Socialists | 28 April 2019 | 3 July 2019 | Replaced by María Victoria Leal. |
| María Vaquero | Gipuzkoa | 1 | 121,318 | EAJ/PNV | | Basque | 28 April 2019 | 23 September 2019 | |
| Manuel Varela | Lugo | 3 | 65,653 | PPdeG | PP | People's | 28 April 2019 | 23 September 2019 | |
| Antonio Vázquez | A Coruña | 1 | 208,400 | PSdeG | PSOE | Socialists | 28 April 2019 | 23 September 2019 | |
| Jesús Vázquez | Galicia | – | Appointed | PPdeG | PP | People's | 26 June 2019 | 23 September 2019 | |
| Miguel Vázquez | Andalusia | – | Appointed | PSOE–A | PSOE | Socialists | 7 February 2019 | 23 September 2019 | |
| Ana Velilla | Zaragoza | 1 | 140,521 | Cs | Cs | Citizens | 28 April 2019 | 23 September 2019 | |
| Cándida Verdier | Cádiz | 3 | 189,284 | PSOE–A | PSOE | Socialists | 28 April 2019 | 23 September 2019 | |
| Salvador Vidal | León | 1 | 96,241 | PSCyL | PSOE | Socialists | 28 April 2019 | 23 September 2019 | |
| Vicenç Vidal | Balearics | – | Appointed | PSM | Més | Left | 12 July 2019 | 2 December 2019 | |
| Sara Vilà | Catalonia | – | Appointed | ICV | CC–P | Left | 4 May 2018 | 23 September 2019 | |
| Maria Villalba | Teruel | 1 | 25,525 | PSA | PSOE | Socialists | 28 April 2019 | 2 December 2019 | |
| Idoia Villanueva | Navarre | – | Appointed | Podemos | UP | Left | 17 September 2015 | 17 June 2019 | |
| Ana Villar | Zaragoza | 2 | 168,282 | PSA | PSOE | Socialists | 28 April 2019 | 23 September 2019 | |
| Miguel Viso | Ourense | 1 | 69,974 | PPdeG | PP | People's | 28 April 2019 | 23 September 2019 | |
| Alejandro Zubeldia | Granada | 1 | 174,896 | PSOE–A | PSOE | Socialists | 28 April 2019 | 23 September 2019 | |

== See also ==
- 13th Cortes Generales
- 13th Congress of Deputies
