= Tomás Marcos Arias =

Spanish politician

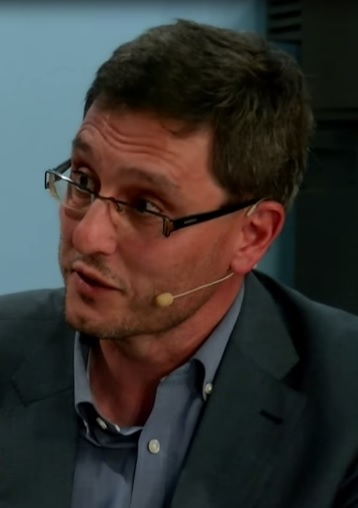

Spokesperson of the Citizens' Group in the Senate
- In office January 29, 2021 – June 8, 2021
- Preceded by: Lorena Roldán
- Succeeded by: Miguel Sánchez López

Senator in the Spanish Parliament by designation of the Assembly of Madrid
- In office July 9, 2015 – June 7, 2021

Member of the Assembly of Madrid
- In office June 9, 2015 – March 10, 2021

Personal details
- Born: 12 March 1966 (age 60) Madrid, Spain
- Party: Citizens
- Education: National University of Distance Education
- Occupation: Social Educator

Tomás Marcos Arias (Madrid, March 12, 1966) is a Spanish social educator and politician. He was the spokesman for Citizens in the Senate between January and June 2021.

== Biography ==
Born in Madrid on March 12, 1966, he has a degree in Psychology and a diploma in Communication in political campaigns and lobbying, as well as an expert in social creativity and functional diversity. He has been director of the Fundación Autismo Diario in the Community of Madrid. In the elections to the Assembly of Madrid in 2015 he was elected deputy for Ciudadanos and was subsequently appointed senator by designation of the Assembly of Madrid.

In January he was appointed spokesperson for Citizens in the Senate, replacing Lorena Roldán. In the 2021 Madrid Assembly elections, his party lost its autonomic representation in the region, and lost its seats in the Senate.
