= Dionisio García Carnero =

Spanish politician (1954–2025)

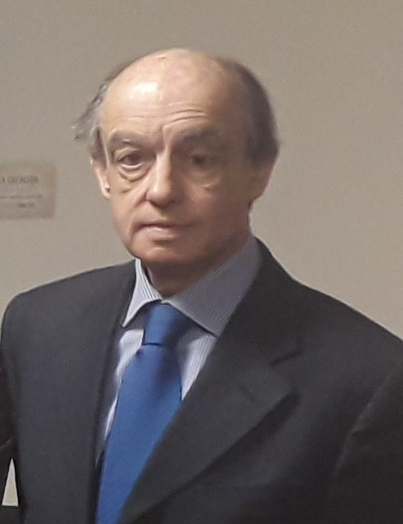

Dionisio García Carnero (Spanish: [djoˈnisjo ɣaɾˈθia kaɾˈneɾo]; 13 November 1954 – 16 July 2025) was a Spanish politician. He was a member of the People's Party.

== Life and career ==
García was born in Friera de Valverde on 13 November 1954. He was the deputy mayor of Benavente (1987–1995). He was a senator representing the Zamora constituency on two occasions, serving between 1993 and 2000, and again between 2004 and 2019.

García died on 16 July 2025, at the age of 70.
