= Javier Antón Cacho =

Spanish politician (born 1972)

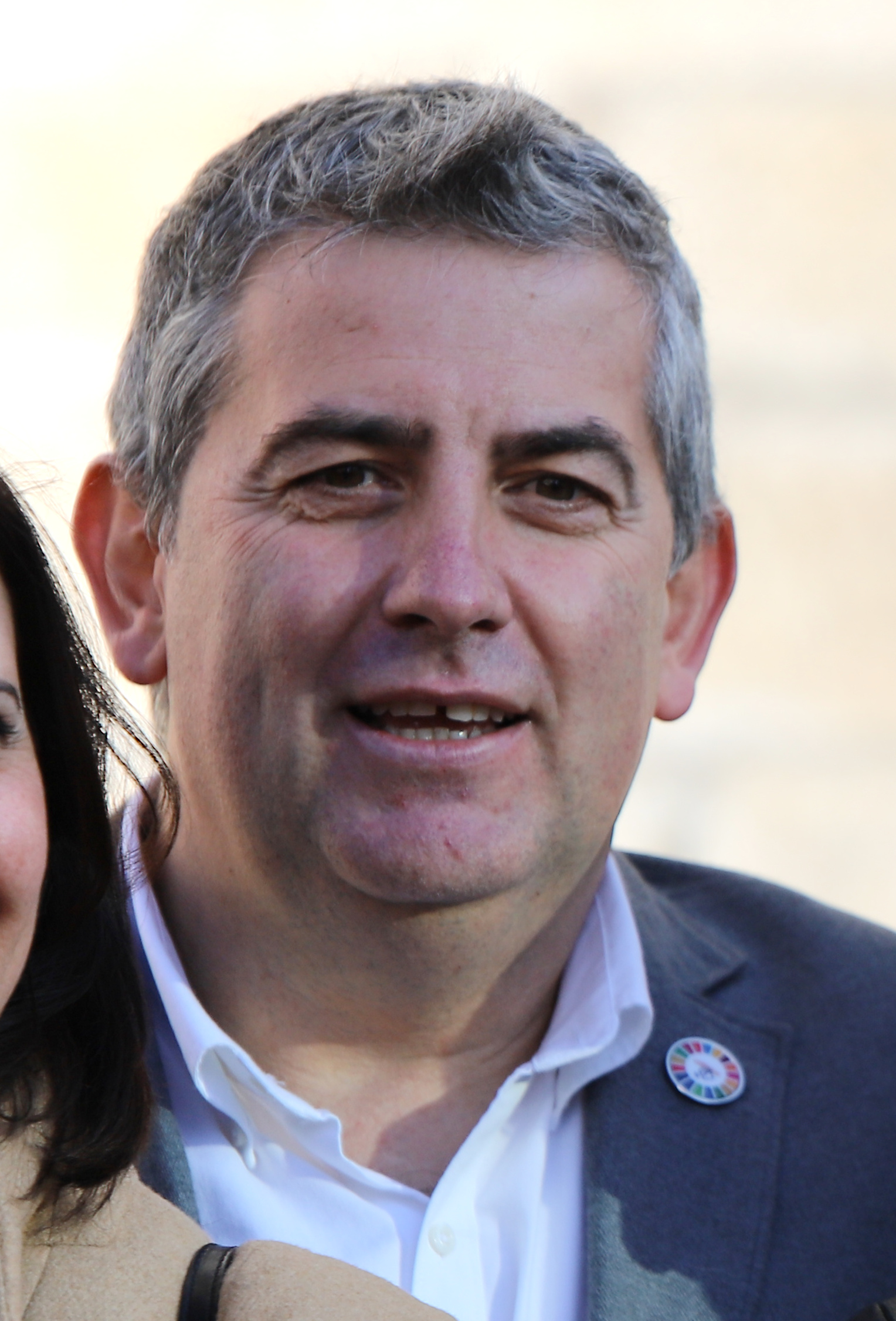
- Antón Cacho in 2020

Member of the Senate
- Incumbent
- Assumed office 17 August 2023
- Constituency: Soria

Member of the Congress of Deputies
- In office 13 January 2016 – 30 May 2023
- Constituency: Soria

Personal details
- Born: 24 October 1972 (age 53)
- Party: Spanish Socialist Workers' Party

Javier Antón Cacho (born 24 October 1972) is a Spanish politician serving as a member of the Senate since 2023. From 2016 to 2023, he was a member of the Congress of Deputies.
