= Friera de Valverde =

Coordinates: 41°54′N 5°50′W

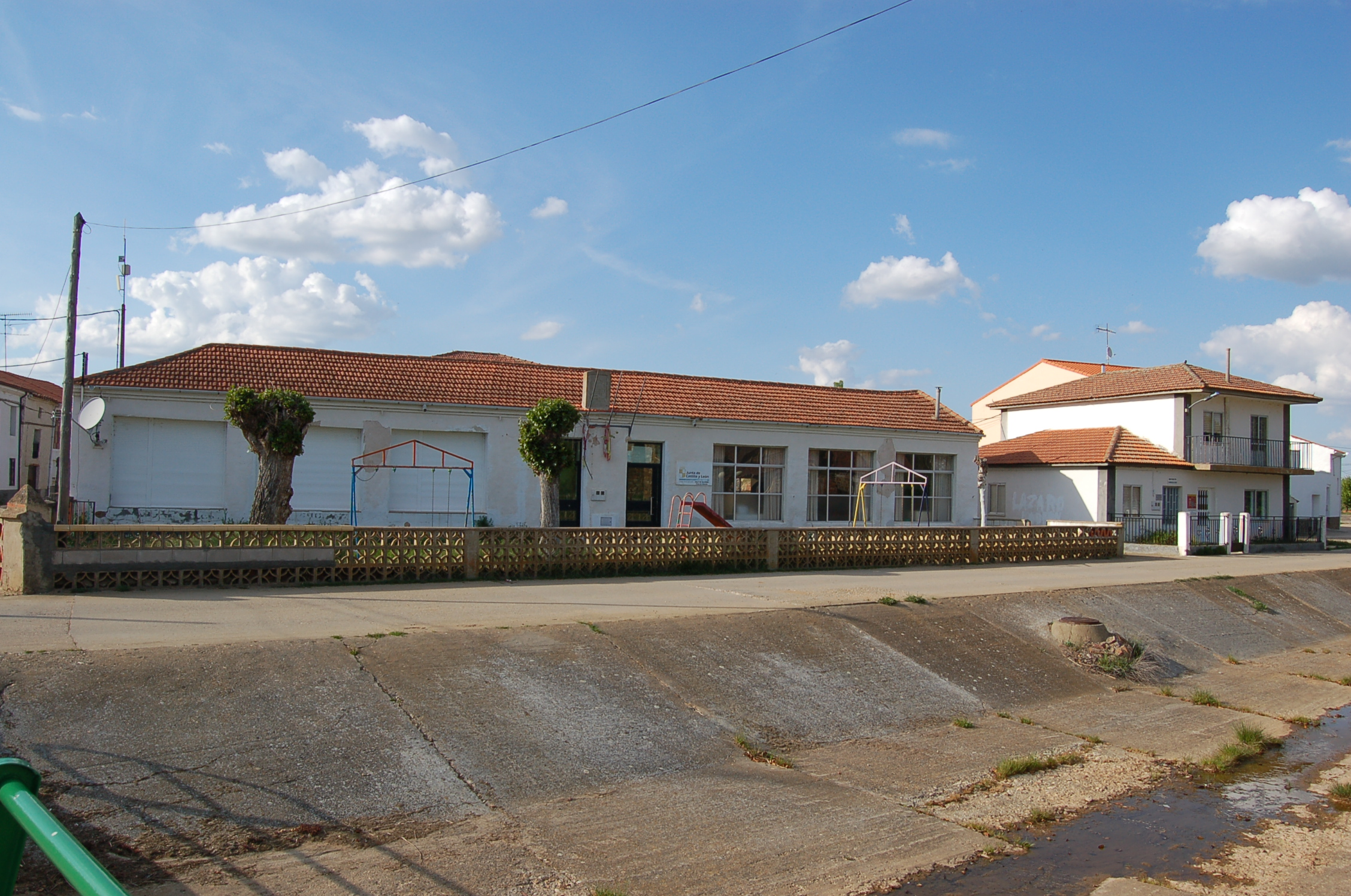
- Interactive map of Friera de Valverde
- Country: Spain
- Autonomous community: Castile and León
- Province: Zamora
- Municipality: Friera de Valverde

Area
  - Total: 19 km^{2} (7.3 sq mi)

Population (2025-01-01)
  - Total: 121
  - Density: 6.4/km^{2} (16/sq mi)
- Time zone: UTC+1 (CET)
  - Summer (DST): UTC+2 (CEST)
- Website: Official webpage

Friera de Valverde is a municipality located in the province of Zamora, Castile and León, Spain. According to the 2009 census (INE), the municipality has a population of 227 inhabitants.

== Notable people ==
- Dionisio García Carnero (1954–2025), former Senator of Zamora)
