= José Latorre =

Spanish politician (born 1987)

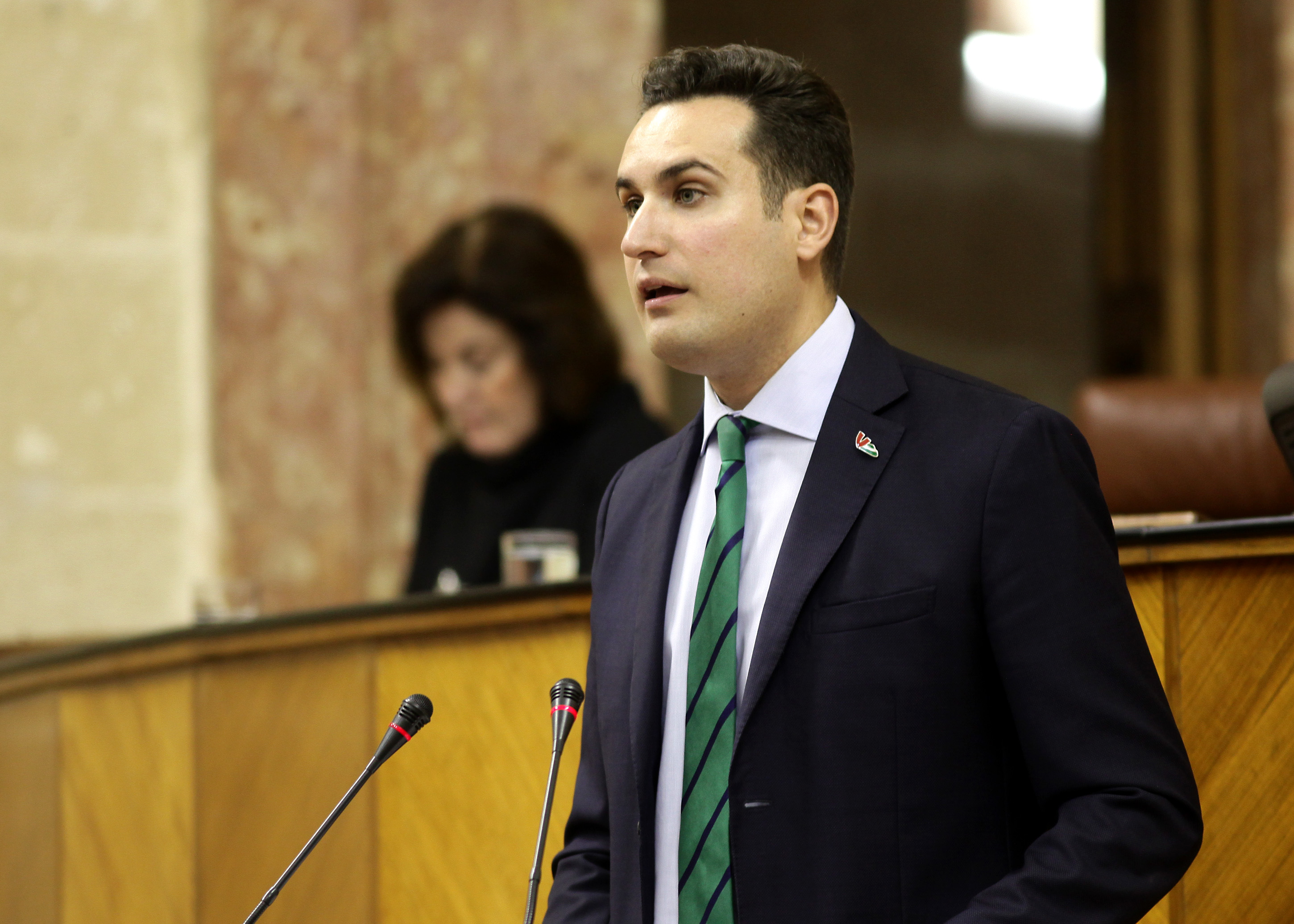
- Latorre in 2018

Member of the Senate
- Incumbent
- Assumed office 21 May 2019
- Constituency: Jaén

Personal details
- Born: 22 March 1987 (age 39)
- Party: Spanish Socialist Workers' Party

José Latorre Ruiz (born 22 March 1987) is a Spanish politician serving as a member of the Senate since 2019. From 2015 to 2018, he was a member of the Parliament of Andalusia.
