= Carmen Leyte =

Spanish politician

María del Carmen Leyte Coello (born 3 December 1953) is a Spanish doctor and politician of the People's Party (PP) who has been a member of the Senate of Spain since the 2008 general election, representing the Province of Ourense.

== Political career ==
Leyte was born in Vigo and was the mayor of Cartelle between 1991 and 2017.

In addition to her role in parliament, Leyte has been serving as a member of the Spanish delegation to the Parliamentary Assembly of the Council of Europe since 2018. In the Assembly, she is a member of the Committee on Social Affairs, Health and Sustainable Development (since 2020), Sub-Committee on the Europe Prize (since 2020), Sub-Committee on Children (since 2020), the Sub-Committee on Public Health and Sustainable Development (since 2019) and Committee on Migration, Refugees and Displaced Persons (2018–2019). In this capacity, she authored reports on vaccine-preventable diseases (2022) and Long COVID (2025).

== Personal life ==
On 12 March 2020 during the first wave of the COVID-19 pandemic in Spain, Leyte tested positive for SARS-CoV-2.
