= Vicente Azpitarte =

Spanish politician (born 1983)

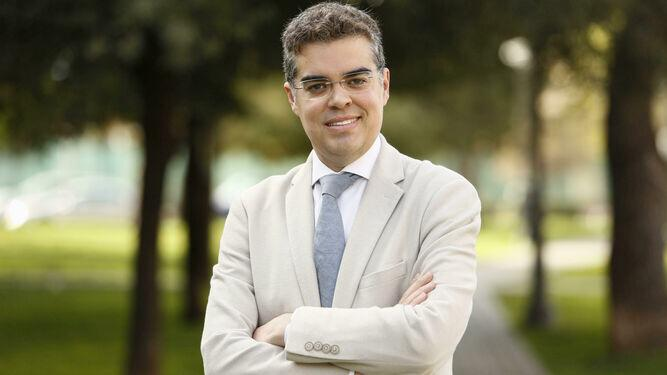
- Azpitarte in 2019

Member of the Senate
- Incumbent
- Assumed office 17 August 2023
- Constituency: Granada
- In office 21 May 2019 – 24 September 2019
- Constituency: Granada

Personal details
- Born: 27 May 1983 (age 43)
- Party: People's Party

Vicente Azpitarte Pérez (born 27 May 1983) is a Spanish politician. He has been a member of the Senate since 2023, having previously served from May to September 2019. From 2019 to 2023, he served as delegate of the Regional Government of Andalusia in Madrid.
