= Inés Plaza =

Spanish politician (born 1978)

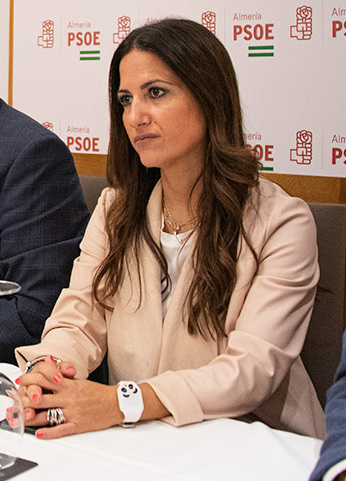
Inés Plaza in 2019

Inés María Plaza García (born 1978) is a Spanish politician from the Spanish Socialist Workers' Party. She has represented Almería in the Congress of Deputies since the 2023 Spanish general election. She was a member of the Senate of Spain from 2019 to 2023.
