= Francisco Díaz Muñoz =

Spanish politician (born 1992)

Member of the Senate
- In office 21 May 2019 – 23 April 2025
- Appointed by: Cortes of Castile and León

Personal details
- Born: 20 October 1992 (age 33)
- Party: Spanish Socialist Workers' Party

Francisco Díaz Muñoz (born 20 October 1992) is a Spanish politician serving as secretary for municipal policy of the Socialist Party of Castile and León since 2025. From 2019 to 2025, he was a member of the Senate.
