= Mirella Cortès Gès =

Spanish politician

Spokesman of the Republican Group in the Senate
- Incumbent
- Assumed office 4 May 2018
- Preceded by: Santiago Vidal Marsal

Senator in the Senate of Spain for Barcelona
- Incumbent
- Assumed office 10 November 2019

by designation of the Parliament of Catalonia
- In office 4 May 2018 – 20 May 2019

Personal details
- Born: 17 August 1958 (age 68) Sallent de Llobregat, Spain
- Party: Republican Left of Catalonia
- Occupation: Politician

Mirella Cortès Gès (Sallent de Llobregat, 17 August 1958) is a Spanish politician. A member of Republican Left of Catalonia she was mayor of Sallent de Llobregat between 2003 and 2007, and since 2016 she has been a senator in the 11th and 12th Cortes Generales.

== Career ==
In the Spanish municipal elections of 2003 she was elected mayor of Sallent de Llobregat through a coalition of Esquerra Republicana with two other political forces. This pact was not achieved again for subsequent elections and after the Spanish municipal elections of 2007 and 2011 she was a councilor in the opposition. Shortly thereafter she was appointed secretary of Municipal Policy of ERC in Bages.

In the 2015 general elections she was in sixth place on the ERC list for the province of Barcelona, and was not elected. However, in January 2016 she was proposed as a senator appointed by the Parliament of Catalonia in the 11th Cortes Generales. In the Senate she is spokesperson for the ERC.

She was reelected senator by the Catalan Parliament on 4 May 2018. Days later, on 8 May, she attempted to swear her oath of office before Senate President Pío García-Escudero in the Catalan language, expressing that she was swearing "for the freedom of political prisoners, for the return of exiles, until the consolidation of the Catalan republic" and that she was promising "by legal imperative." García-Escudero did not accept it and made her modify and repeat her oath several times, even agreeing to swear in Catalan and Spanish.
