= Idoia Villanueva =

Spanish politician

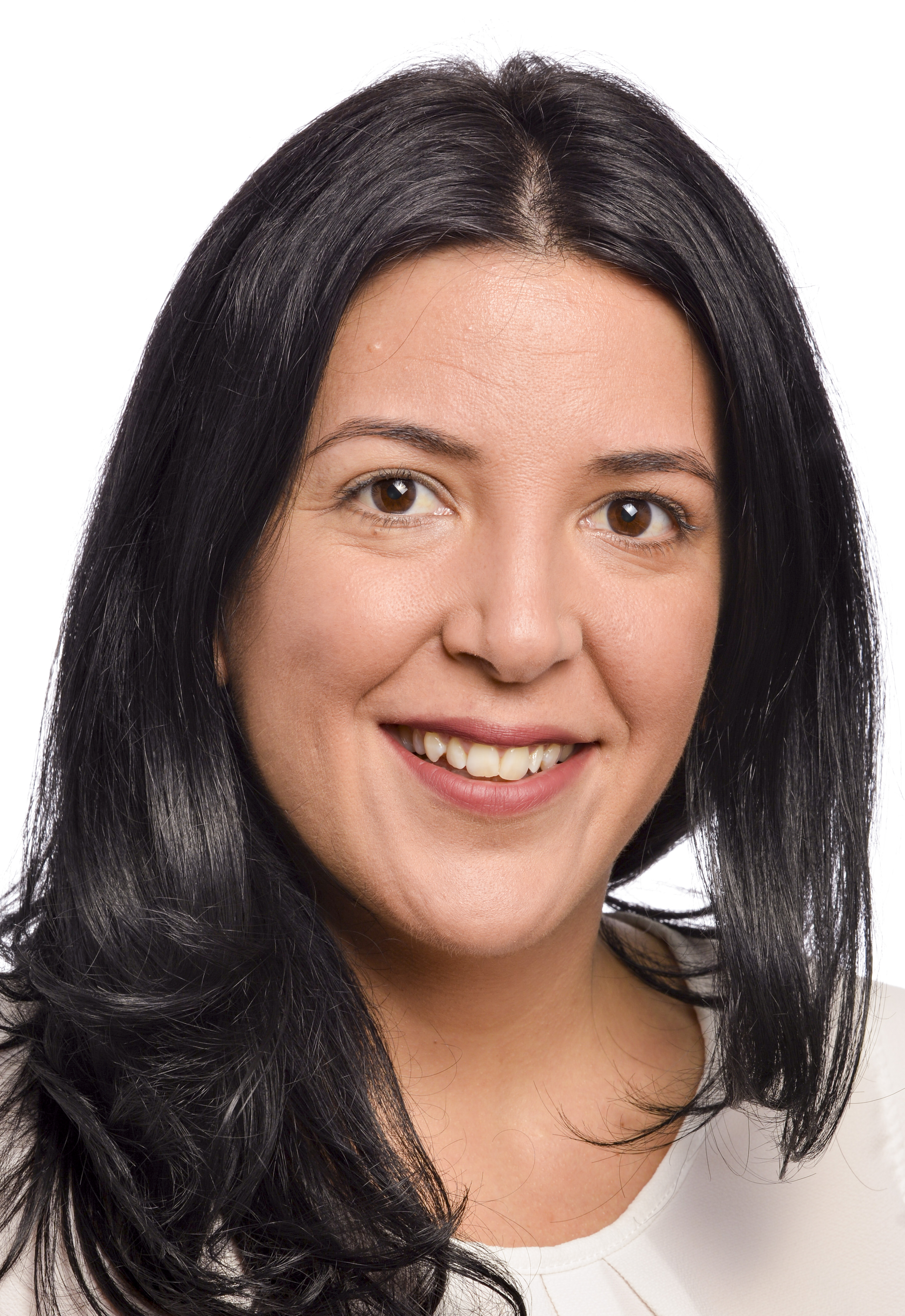

Member of the European Parliament
- Incumbent
- Assumed office 2 July 2019
- Constituency: Spain

Senator
- In office 2015–2019
- Appointed by: Parliament of Navarre

Personal details
- Born: 17 July 1980 (age 46) Pamplona, Spain
- Party: Podemos

Idoia Villanueva Ruiz (Spanish pronunciation: [iˈðoʝa βiʎaˈnweβa]; born 1980) is a Spanish politician and engineer. A member of Podemos, she serves as Member of the European Parliament integrated within the European United Left–Nordic Green Left political group since 2019. She previously was a member of the Senate of Spain from 2015 to 2019.

== Biography ==
Born in Pamplona on 17 July 1980, she earned a degree in IT engineering from the University of the Basque Country (UPV); she later obtained a master's degree in Business Management at the Autonomous University of Madrid (UAM). She worked for ten years in the management and development of tech projects. She was proposed to the post of Senator by Podemos, and, thus, she was designated as member of the Upper House in September 2015 by the Parliament of Navarre. She served as Podemos spokesperson in the Committee on Foreign Affairs and the Committee for the European Union. She joined the Podemos' executive board (the "Coordination Council") in February 2017 replacing Ángela Ballester. In October 2018, she was announced as prospective party candidate for the 2019 European Parliament election in Spain, and she was ultimately included in the fourth place of the Unidas Podemos Cambiar Europa electoral list. (Note: She highlighted that the basic lines of the party platform for the election included the vow to "terminate tax havens" and to "secure a green and feminist horizon".)

She was elected MEP. She joined the Committee on Foreign Affairs (AFET), as well as the Delegation for relations with the People's Republic of China (D-CN), the Delegation for Relations with India (D-IN) and the Delegation to the ACP–EU Joint Parliamentary Assembly (DACP), serving as vice-chair in the latter body.
