= Rafael Hernando Fraile =

Spanish attorney and politician

Rafael Hernando MP
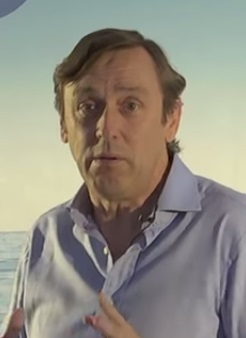

Spokesperson of the Popular Group in the Congress of Deputies
- In office 16 December 2014 – 26 July 2018
- Preceded by: Alfonso Alonso
- Succeeded by: Dolors Montserrat

Member of the Congress of Deputies for Almería Province
- Incumbent
- Assumed office 7 June 1993

Member of the Spanish Senate from Guadalajara
- In office 29 October 1989 – 13 April 1993

Member of the Cortes of Castile-La Mancha from Guadalajara
- In office 10 June 1987 – 29 October 1989

Personal details
- Born: Rafael Antonio Hernando Fraile; 13 November 1961 (age 64) Guadalajara, Castile-La Mancha, Spain
- Party: People's Party
- Occupation: Attorney; Politician

Rafael Antonio Hernando Fraile (born 13 November 1961) is a Spanish attorney and politician who represents Almería Province in the Spanish Congress of Deputies. He was the spokesperson of the People's Party in Congress between 2014 and 2018. He has also been the President of New Generations.

Hernando was born in Guadalajara, Castile-La Mancha.
