= Ana Martínez Zaragoza =

Spanish politician (born 1981)

Member of the Senate
- Incumbent
- Assumed office 28 April 2019
- Constituency: Alicante

Personal details
- Born: 29 September 1981 (age 45)
- Party: Spanish Socialist Workers' Party

Ana Martínez Zaragoza (born 29 September 1981) is a Spanish politician serving as a member of the Senate since 2019. She has been a municipal councillor of Guardamar del Segura since 2015.
