= Teresa Ruiz-Sillero =

Spanish politician (born 1968)

Member of the Senate
- Incumbent
- Assumed office 7 February 2019
- Appointed by: Parliament of Andalusia

Personal details
- Born: 15 October 1968 (age 57)
- Party: People's Party

María Teresa Ruiz-Sillero Bernal (born 15 October 1968) is a Spanish politician serving as a member of the Senate since 2019. From 2008 to 2018, she was a member of the Parliament of Andalusia.
