= José Muñoz Sánchez =

Spanish politician (1962–2019)

José Muñoz Sánchez (5 March 1962 – 5 July 2019) was a Spanish politician who served as a Senator since 2018 until his death.
