= Patricia Rodríguez Calleja =

Spanish politician (born 1977)

Member of the Congress of Deputies
- Incumbent
- Assumed office 27 July 2023
- Constituency: Ávila

Member of the Senate
- In office 21 May 2019 – 30 May 2023
- Constituency: Ávila

Personal details
- Born: 28 March 1977 (age 49)
- Party: People's Party

Patricia Rodríguez Calleja (born 28 March 1977) is a Spanish politician serving as a member of the Congress of Deputies since 2023. From 2019 to 2023, she was a member of the Senate.
