= Elia Tortolero =

Spanish politician (born 1988)

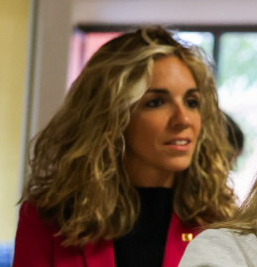
- Tortolero in 2024

Member of the Senate
- In office 28 April 2019 – 2 December 2019
- Constituency: Barcelona

Personal details
- Born: 18 June 1988 (age 37)
- Party: Socialists' Party of Catalonia

Elia Tortolero Orejuela (born 18 June 1988) is a Spanish politician serving as delegate of the government of Catalonia in Catalunya Central since 2024. From April to December 2019, she was a member of the Senate.
