= Antidio Fagúndez =

Spanish politician (born 1976)

Member of the Congress of Deputies
- Incumbent
- Assumed office 3 December 2019
- Constituency: Zamora

Member of the Senate
- In office 12 December 2018 – 23 July 2019
- Appointed by: Cortes of Castile and León

Personal details
- Born: 13 February 1976 (age 50)
- Party: Spanish Socialist Workers' Party

Antidio Fagúndez Campo (born 13 February 1976) is a Spanish politician serving as a member of the Congress of Deputies since 2019. From 2018 to 2019, he was a member of the Senate.
