= Rafael Lemus =

Spanish politician (born 1975)

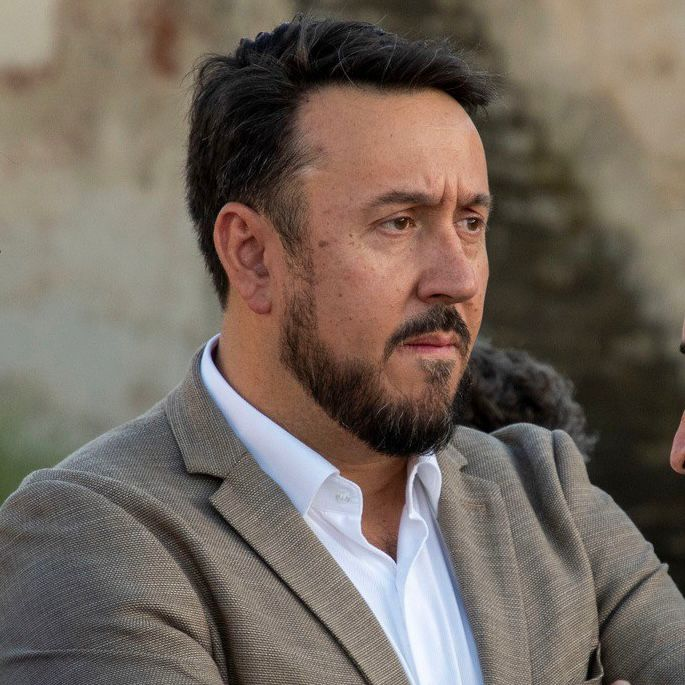
- Lemus in 2023

Member of the Senate
- Incumbent
- Assumed office 21 July 2015
- Appointed by: Assembly of Extremadura (2015–2023)
- Constituency: Badajoz (2023–present)

Personal details
- Born: 12 April 1975 (age 51)
- Party: Spanish Socialist Workers' Party

Rafael Damián Lemus Rubiales (born 12 April 1975) is a Spanish politician serving as a member of the Senate since 2015. He was a member of the Assembly of Extremadura from 2003 to 2007 and from 2011 to 2024.
