= Sara Bailac =

Spanish politician (born 1986)

Member of the Senate
- Incumbent
- Assumed office 25 May 2019
- Constituency: Lleida

Personal details
- Born: 14 February 1986 (age 40)
- Party: Republican Left of Catalonia

Sara Bailac i Ardanuy (born 14 February 1986) is a Spanish politician serving as a member of the Senate since 2019. She has served as spokersperson of the Republican Left of Catalonia in the Senate since 2023.
