= Fernando Martínez-Maíllo =

Spanish politician (born 1969)

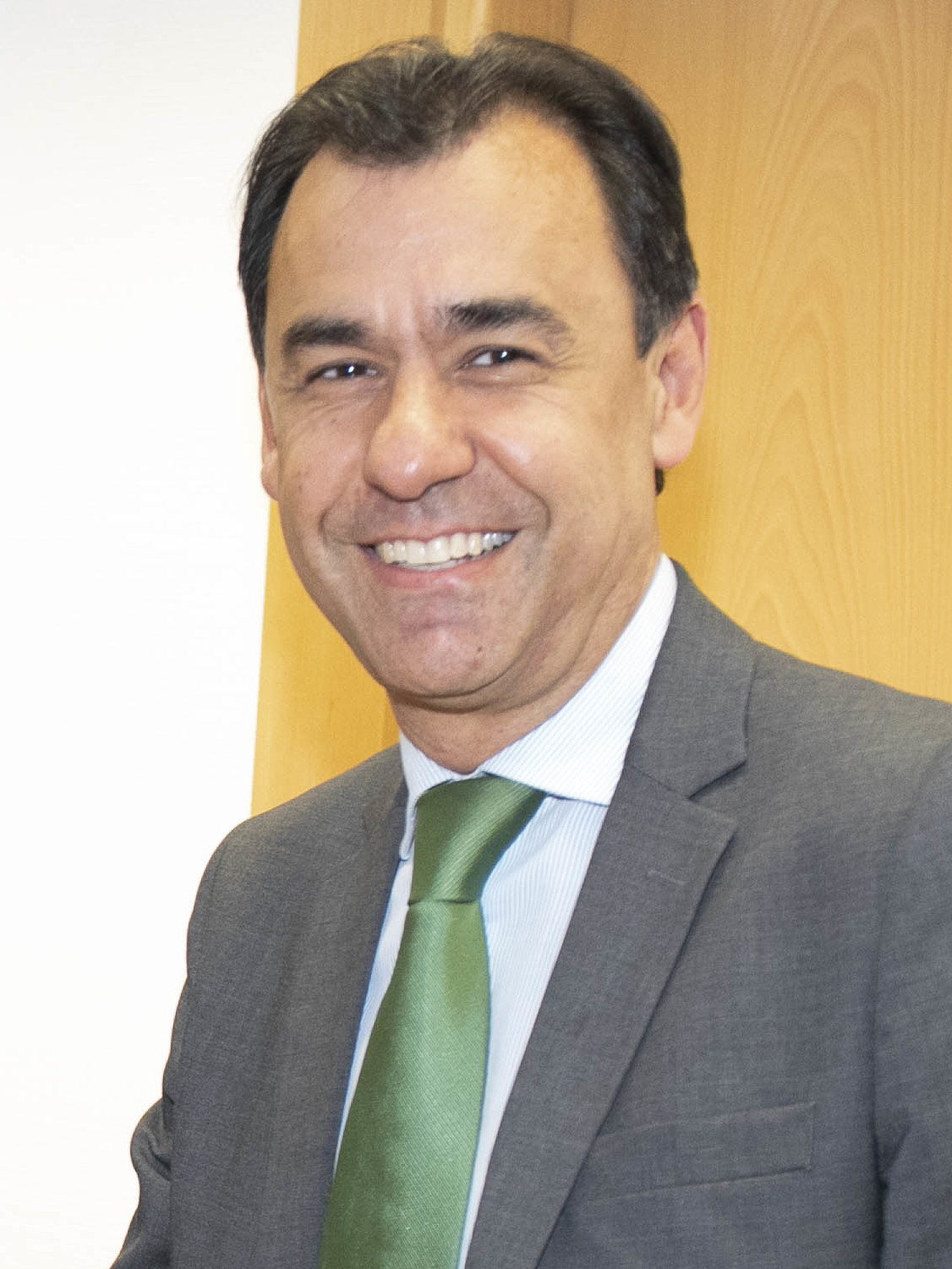
- Martínez-Maíllo in 2018

Member of the Senate
- Incumbent
- Assumed office 21 May 2019
- Constituency: Zamora

Personal details
- Born: 28 September 1969 (age 56)
- Party: People's Party

Fernando Martínez-Maíllo Toribio (born 28 September 1969) is a Spanish politician serving as a member of the Senate since 2019. He was a member of the Congress of Deputies from 2000 to 2004 and from 2016 to 2019. From 2003 to 2015, he served as president of the provincial deputation of Zamora.
