= Nerea Ahedo =

Spanish politician

- Born: Nerea Ahedo Ceza; March 31, 1966 (age 60); Bilbao, Spain
- Occupation: Politician
- Political party: Basque Nationalist Party

Nerea Ahedo Ceza (born March 31, 1966) is a Spanish politician who is a member of the Basque Nationalist Party (PNV). She was born in Bilbao, and has been a senator for Vizcaya since December 20, 2015, in the eleventh and twelfth legislatures.
