= José Cepeda (politician) =

Spanish politician (born 1985)

José Cepeda MEP
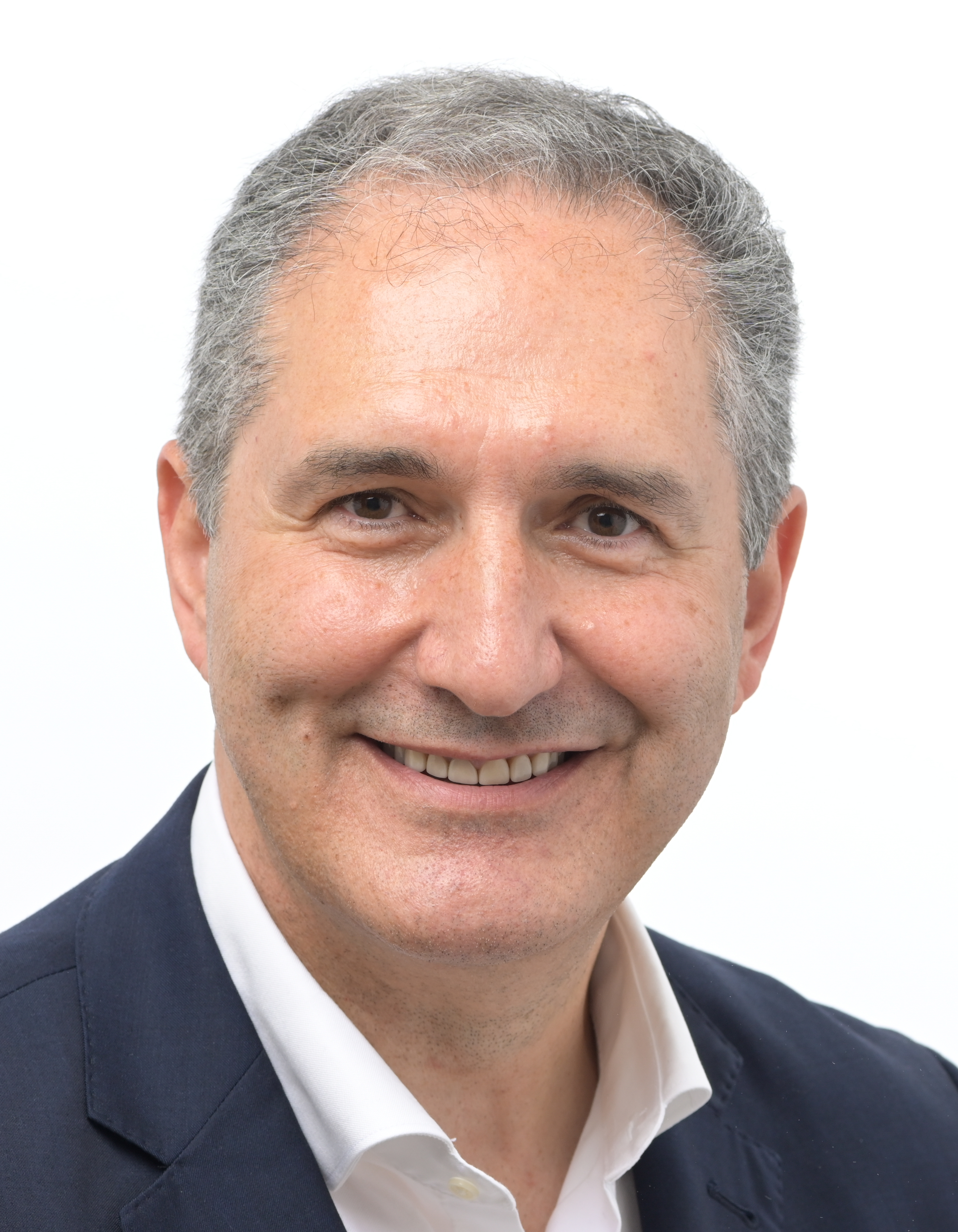

Member of the European Parliament
- Incumbent
- Assumed office 16 July 2024
- Constituency: Spain

Member of the Assembly of Madrid
- In office 10 June 2003 – 10 June 2024

Member of the Senate
- In office 17 September 2021 – 13 July 2023
- Appointed by: Assembly of Madrid
- In office 7 July 2015 – 8 July 2021
- Appointed by: Assembly of Madrid

Personal details
- Born: José Carmelo Cepeda García de León; 19 July 1968 (age 58)
- Party: Spanish Socialist Workers' Party
- Other political affiliations: Party of European Socialists

José Carmelo Cepeda García de León (Spanish pronunciation: [xoˈse θeˈpeða]; born 19 July 1968) is a Spanish politician of the Spanish Socialist Workers' Party who was elected member of the European Parliament in 2024. As of December 2025, he is the vice-chair of the Delegation for relations with the countries of Central America. He previously served as a member of the Assembly of Madrid for two decades, and as senator of Spain, vice president of the Inter-Parliamentary Union, and member of the Council of Europe.

== Biography ==
In 2013, he was awarded the Antena de Plata by the Association of Radio and Television Professionals for his participation in the program “Aquí en la Onda” on the Onda Cero radio station. In 2015, he received the Arco Europeo Communication Award for his work and dedication in the field of political communication.
