= José Vicente Marí Bosó =

Spanish politician (born 1970)

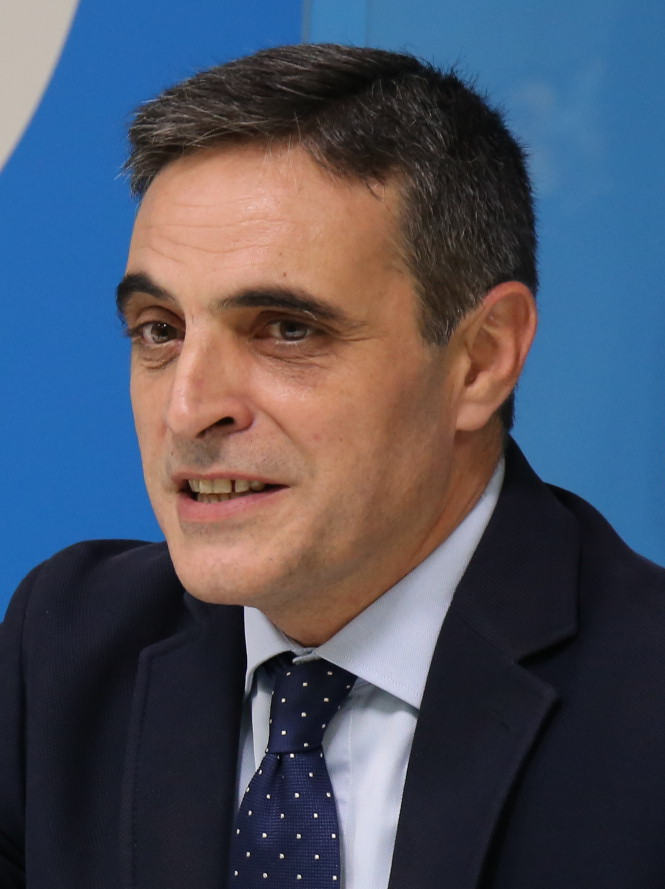
- Marí Bosó in 2017

Member of the Congress of Deputies
- Incumbent
- Assumed office 17 August 2023
- Constituency: Balearic Islands
- In office 13 January 2016 – 5 March 2019
- Constituency: Balearic Islands

Member of the Senate
- In office 21 May 2019 – 29 May 2023
- Appointed by: Parliament of the Balearic Islands

Personal details
- Born: 23 July 1970 (age 55)
- Party: People's Party

José Vicente Marí Bosó (born 23 July 1970) is a Spanish politician. He has been a member of the Congress of Deputies since 2023, having previously served from 2016 to 2019. From 2019 to 2023, he was a member of the Senate.
