= Lorena Roldán =

Spanish politician

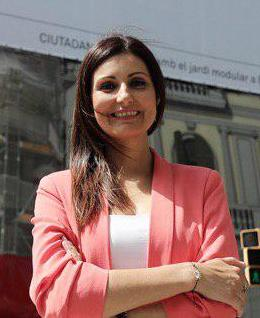

Member of the Parliament of Catalonia
- Incumbent
- Assumed office 10 June 2024
- Constituency: Tarragona
- In office 12 March 2021 – 12 May 2024
- Constituency: Barcelona
- In office 17 January 2018 – 12 January 2021
- Constituency: Tarragona

Personal details
- Born: 7 August 1981 (age 45) Tarragona, Catalonia, Spain
- Party: People's Party
- Other political affiliations: Citizens (2014–2020)
- Education: University of Rovira i Virgili

Lorena Roldán Suárez (born 7 August 1981) is a Spanish politician. She has served as a member of the Parliament of Catalonia since 2015. She was a senator designated by the Catalan parliament from 2018 to 2021 and again from 2024 to 2025. Previously a member of Citizens, she joined the People's Party in 2020.

== Biography ==
Roldán was born in Tarragona, Catalonia, as the only child of a family of maternal Asturian and paternal Andalusian descent. She has an uncle who was voted onto the city council for the Popular Unity Candidacy (CUP), a Catalan separatist party. She obtained a bachelor's and a master's degree in law from the local University of Rovira i Virgili.

Roldán took part in the Catalan Way, a pro-independence event in 2013. She later said that this was down to pressure from her employers at the provincial deputation of Tarragona.

Roldán joined Citizens (Cs) in 2014. She was elected to her city's council in July 2015, and resigned that seat three months later when she was elected to the Parliament of Catalonia by the Tarragona constituency. In April 2018, she was named to the Senate of Spain by the Citizens group in the Parliament of Catalonia. She became the party's spokesperson in the Senate.

In July 2019, Roldán took 86.6% of the votes in the primaries to be Cs' candidate for President of the Government of Catalonia in the 2021 Catalan regional election. In August 2020, the party's executive led by Inés Arrimadas unanimously stripped her of the candidacy and gave it to Carlos Carrizosa, with the reasoning that it wanted a candidate who had only held public office at the regional level.

Roldán was the candidate for president of the Generalitat in an October 2019 motion of no confidence in incumbent Quim Torra. The motion failed with 40 votes in favour from her party and the People's Party (PP), 76 votes against, and 17 abstentions by the Socialists' Party of Catalonia (PSC).

On 30 December 2020, Roldán defected to the PP. In her announcement speech, she praised Citizens founder Albert Rivera, but did not mention Arrimadas. She was elected to the Parliament of Catalonia again in March 2021, this time by the Barcelona constituency as second on the list behind People's Party of Catalonia leader Alejandro Fernández; she did not officially join the party until that October. In April 2022, she became her new party's spokesperson in Catalonia.
