= Miguel Sánchez López =

Spanish lawyer, criminologist and politician

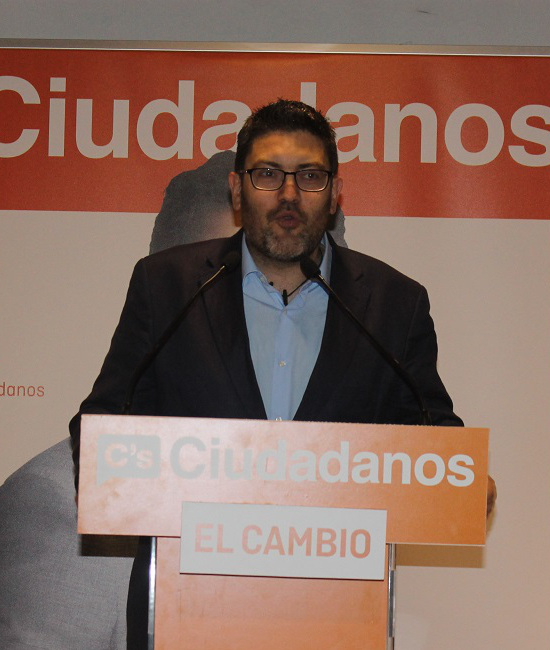

Senator in the Cortes Generales by designation of the Regional Assembly of Murcia
- Incumbent
- Assumed office June 20, 2019

Member of the Regional Assembly of Murcia
- In office June 15, 2015 – June 19, 2019

Councillor of the Caravaca de la Cruz City Council
- In office June 2011 – November 3, 2014

Personal details
- Born: 1972 (age 53–54) Caravaca de la Cruz, Spain
- Party: Citizens (since 2014); UPyD
- Education: University of Murcia
- Occupation: Politician

Miguel Sánchez López (Caravaca de la Cruz, 1972) is a Spanish lawyer, criminologist and politician with professional offices in Murcia and Caravaca de la Cruz, and Citizens candidate for the Presidency of the Region of Murcia in 2015. Since June 2019 he has been a senator by regional designation of the Regional Assembly of Murcia, being the only senator of Citizens and spokesman in the Upper house of the same.

== Biography ==
Miguel Sánchez was born in Caravaca de la Cruz, Murcia. He studied two degrees, graduating in Law and Criminology from the University of Murcia. He is also a Bankruptcy Administrator and Director of Free Time.

At the end of the 90's, he presided over the Youth Council of the Region of Murcia, and participated as a cooperant of the Diocese of Cartagena in different projects in Latin America, specifically in La Paz, Bolivia.

In 2011 he joined UPyD, and was elected councilor in the City Council of Caravaca de la Cruz by this formation, a position he defended until November 3, 2014, when he resigned, when the scandal of the Roblecillo Case came to light, where, the then Mayor of Caravaca, Domingo Aranda, and his entire government team, were charged with corruption.

In February 2014, she was a member of the alternative candidacy for the internal elections to chair the Territorial Council of UPyD in the Region of Murcia, emerging victorious, but annulled by the party's Electoral Commission for a comment on Facebook.

After the internal crisis produced in UPyD, added to the expulsion of Francisco Sosa Wagner for his public approach to Ciudadanos, Miguel Sanchez led the massive flight of a hundred affiliates to this party.

After presenting 434 valid endorsements, compared to 129 for his rival and current chamber colleague Luis Fernández, he also won the elections with a 42% backing of the party's affiliates in the Region. Thus, he was elected in March 2015 as Ciudadanos' candidate for the Presidency of the Region of Murcia.

In the May 2015 regional elections, he won four seats in the Regional Assembly of Murcia (one for the second constituency and three for the third) and 79,057 votes. He supported the PP candidate, Pedro Antonio Sánchez, as the new president of Murcia, after reaching an investiture pact, remaining in the opposition.
