= 14th Senate of Spain =

←	13th	15th	→
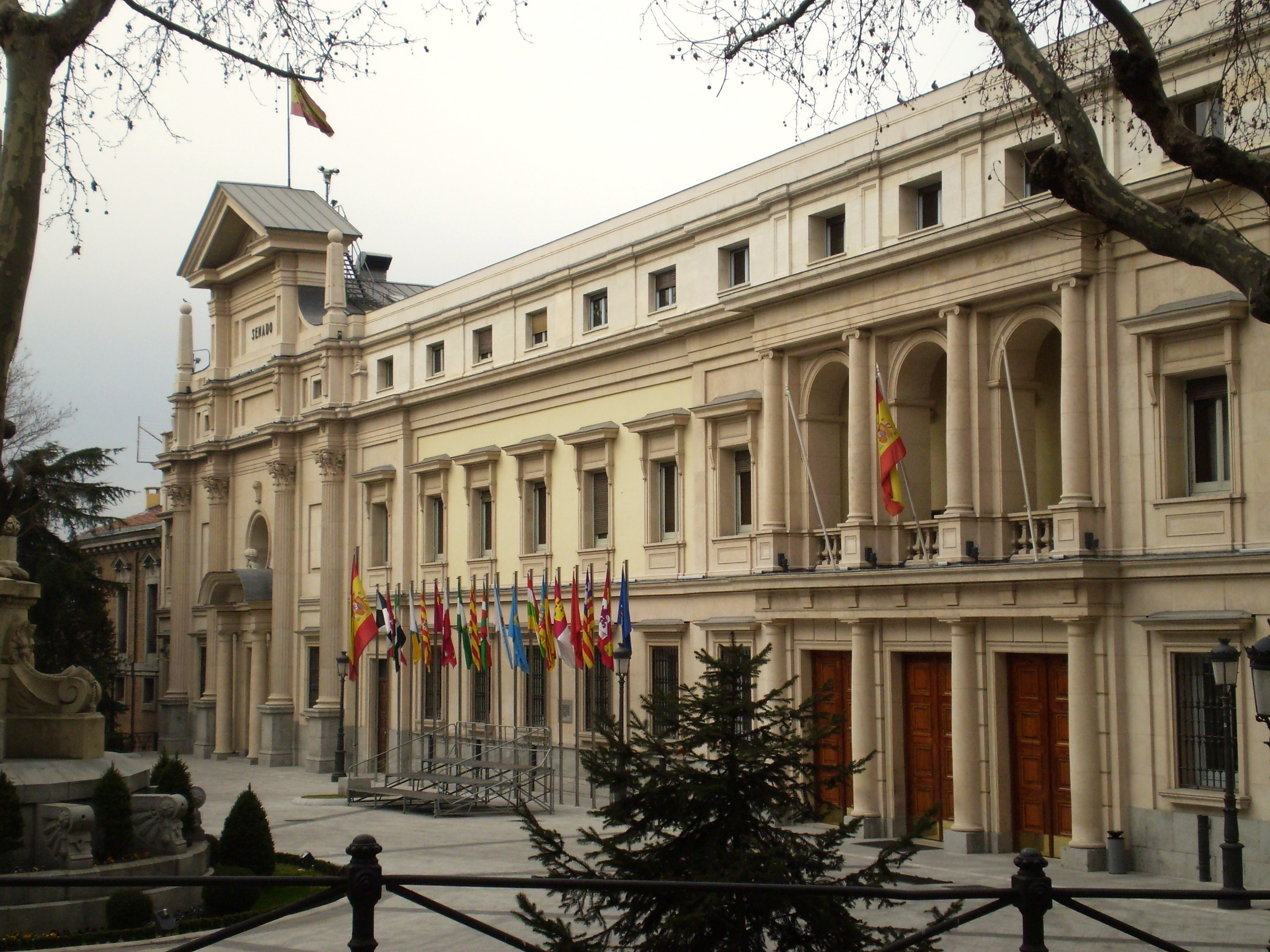

Overview
- Legislative body: Senate of Spain
- Meeting place: Palacio del Senado
- Term: 3 December 2019 – 30 May 2023
- Election: 10 November 2019
- Government: Sánchez
- Website: senado.es

Senators
- Members: 265
- President: Pilar Llop (PSOE) (2019-2021); Ander Gil (PSOE) (2021–2023)
- First Vice-President: Cristina Narbona (PSOE)
- Second Vice-President: Pío García-Escudero (PP)
- First Secretary: Francisco Fajardo (PSOE)
- Second Secretary: Imanol Landa (EAJ)
- Third Secretary: Rafael Hernando (PP)
- Fourth Secretary: Cristina Ayala (PP)

The 14th Senate of Spain was a meeting of the Senate of Spain, the upper house of the Spanish Cortes Generales, with the membership determined primarily by the results of the general election held on 10 November 2019. The Senate met for the first time on 3 December 2019. According to the Constitution of Spain the maximum legislative term of the senate is 4 years from the preceding election.

== Election ==
The 14th Spanish general election under the 1978 Constitution was held on 10 November 2019. It saw the Spanish Socialist Workers' Party (PSOE) remaining the largest party in the Senate, but falling short of a majority.

Alliance	Seats	+/−
PSOE	93	–30
PP	83	+29
ERC–Sob–ERPV	11	±0
EAJ/PNV	9	±0
JxCat–Junts	3	+1
Vox	2	+2
EH Bildu	1	±0
Cs	0	–4
Others	6	+2
Total	208	±0

== History ==
The new senate met for the first time on 3 December 2019 and after two rounds of voting Pilar Llop (PSOE) was elected as President of the Senate of Spain.

Other members of the Bureau of the Senate were also elected on 3 December 2019: Cristina Narbona (PSOE), First Vice-President; Pío García-Escudero (PP), Second Vice-President; Francisco Fajardo (PSOE), First Secretary; Imanol Landa (EAJ), Second Secretary; Rafael Hernando (PP), Third Secretary; and Cristina Ayala (PP), Fourth Secretary.

President
Candidate		Votes	
Candidate		Round 1	Round 2
Pilar Llop	PSOE	132	130
Pío García-Escudero	PP	107	109
José Marín	Vox	2	—N/a
Blank ballots		8	8
Invalid ballots		15	16
Absentees		0	1
Vacant		1	1
Total		265	265

Vice-President
Candidate		Votes
Cristina Narbona	PSOE	130
Pío García-Escudero	PP	107
José Marín	Vox	1
Juan Ros	Vox	1
Blank ballots		8
Invalid ballots		16
Absentees		1
Vacant		1
Total		265

Secretary
Candidate		Votes
Francisco Fajardo	PSOE	131
Imanol Landa	PNV	126
Rafael Hernando	PP	109
Cristina Ayala	PP	107
José Marín	Vox	2
Juan Ros	Vox	2
Blank ballots		2
Invalid ballots		15
Total		494

== Deaths, resignations and regional legislature appointments ==
The 14th senate has seen the following deaths, resignations and regional legislature appointments:

=== Elected senators ===
- 11 February 2020 – María García (PSOE) resigned after being appointed government delegate in Andalusia. She will be replaced by Abelardo Vico (PSOE).

=== Appointed senators ===
- 19 December 2019 – Jacobo González-Robatto (Vox) appointed by the Parliament of Andalusia.

== Members ==
Name	Constituency	No.	Votes	Party	Alliance	Group	Took office	Left office	Notes
Patricia Abascal	Ibiza–Formentera	1	15,574	PSIB	PSOE	Socialists	10 November 2019		
Sofía Acedo	Melilla	2	9,080	PP	PP	People's	10 November 2019		
María Adrio	Pontevedra	2	160,446	PSdeG	PSOE	Socialists	10 November 2019		
Ana Agudíez	Segovia	1	25,891	PSCyL	PSOE	Socialists	10 November 2019		
Carolina Agudo	Castilla-La Mancha	–	Appointed	PPCM	PP	People's	23 July 2019 (Note: Appointed by a regional legislature during a previous senate, continued to serve in 14th senate.)		
José Aguilar	Málaga	3	209,692	PSOE-A	PSOE	Socialists	10 November 2019		
Nerea Ahedo	Biscay	1	230,304	EAJ/PNV		Basque	10 November 2019		
Antonio Alarcó	Tenerife	1	94,195	PPC	PP	People's	10 November 2019		
Rosa Aldea	Palencia	1	31,890	PSCyL	PSOE	Socialists	10 November 2019		
Francisco Alegre	Catalonia	–	Appointed	Cs	Cs	Citizens	4 May 2018		
María Alía	Toledo	2	122,152	PPCM	PP	People's	10 November 2019		
Jesús Alonso	Soria	1	16,263	PSCyL	PSOE	Socialists	10 November 2019		
Ana Alós	Huesca	1	37,769	PPA	PP	People's	10 November 2019		
María Álvarez	Asturias	–	Appointed	FSA	PSOE	Socialists	28 November 2019		
Asier Antona	Canaries	–	Appointed	PPC	PP	People's	31 July 2019		
Francisco Aragón	Granada	3	151,108	PSOE-A	PSOE	Socialists	10 November 2019		
José Aranda	Zaragoza	1	162,580	PPA	PP	People's	10 November 2019		
Javier Arenas	Andalusia	–	Appointed	PPA	PP	People's	7 February 2019		
Emilio Argüeso	Valencia	–	Appointed	Cs	Cs	Citizens	27 June 2019		
María Arnáiz	Burgos	2	64,033	PSCyL	PSOE	Socialists	10 November 2019		
Rosa Arza	Lugo	2	67,701	PPdeG	PP	People's	10 November 2019		
José Asensi	Alicante	1	244,327	PSPV	PSOE	Socialists	10 November 2019		
Miguel Aubà	Tarragona	1	120,622	Indep.	ERC–Sob	ERC–EHB (Note: Republican Left of Catalonia–EH Bildu)	10 November 2019		
Cristina Ayala	Burgos	2	67,742	PPCyL	PP	People's	10 November 2019		Fourth Secretary.
Sara Bailac	Lleida	1	78,411	ERC	ERC–Sob	ERC–EHB	10 November 2019		
José Barreiro	Lugo	1	69,692	PPdeG	PP	People's	10 November 2019		
José Barrios	Zamora	2	35,571	PPCyL	PP	People's	10 November 2019		
Mercedes Berenguer	Valencia	2	382,882	PSPV	PSOE	Socialists	10 November 2019		
Francisco Bernabé	Murcia	3	196,810	PPRM	PP	People's	10 November 2019		
Idurre Bideguren	Basque Country	–	Appointed		EH Bildu	ERC–EHB	31 April 2019		
Jokin Bildarratz	Basque Country	–	Appointed	EAJ/PNV		Basque	15 December 2016		
Francisco Blanco	Asturias	1	189,325	FSA	PSOE	Socialists	10 November 2019		
Manuel Blasco	Teruel	1	20,925	PPA	PP	People's	10 November 2019		
José Bolaños	Ciudad Real	3	87,886	PSCM	PSOE	Socialists	10 November 2019		
Cosme Bonet	Mallorca	1	91,522	PSIB	PSOE	Socialists	10 November 2019		
Josefina Bueno	Valencia	–	Appointed	PSPV	PSOE	Socialists	27 June 2019		
Marisa Bustinduy	Andalusia	–	Appointed	PSOE-A	PSOE	Socialists	7 February 2019		
Miquel Caminal	Lleida	2	71,084	ERC	ERC–Sob	ERC–EHB	10 November 2019		
Ana Camins	Madrid	–	Appointed	PPCM	PP	People's	11 July 2019		
Francisco Cañizares	Ciudad Real	1	90,261	PPCM	PP	People's	10 November 2019		
María Cantalapiedra	Valladolid	1	114,823	PPCyL	PP	People's	10 November 2019		
Esther Carmona	El Hierro	1	2,025	PSC	PSOE	Socialists	10 November 2019		
Jesús Caro	Ávila	1	23,773	PSCyL	PSOE	Socialists	10 November 2019		
Fran Carrillo	Andalusia	–	Appointed	Cs	Cs	Citizens	7 February 2019		
Verónica Casal	A Coruña	3	181,281	PPdeG	PP	People's	10 November 2019		
Laura Castel	Tarragona	2	113,512	Indep.	ERC–Sob	ERC–EHB	10 November 2019		
Santiago Castellà	Tarragona	1	71,199	PSC	PSOE	Socialists	10 November 2019		
Xavier Castellana	Lleida	3	66,067	ERC	ERC–Sob	ERC–EHB	10 November 2019		
Assumpció Castellví	Catalonia	–	Appointed	Junts	JxCat	Nationalists (Note: Nationalists: Together for Catalonia–Canarian Coalition/Canarian Nationalist Party)	22 May 2020		Left the PDeCAT in Aug. 2020.
María Castro	Cádiz	1	187,722	PSOE-A	PSOE	Socialists	10 November 2019		
Alberto Catalán	Navarre	3	101,945	UPN	NA+	Mixed	10 November 2019		
José Cepeda	Madrid	–	Appointed	PSOE-M	PSOE	Socialists	11 July 2019		
Josep Cervera	Girona	2	94,236	Junts	JxCat	Nationalists	10 November 2019		Left the PDeCAT in Aug. 2020.
Fabián Chinea	La Gomera	1	3,628	ASG		Mixed	10 November 2019		
Fernando Clavijo	Canaries	–	Appointed	CCa	CCa–PNC	Nationalists	31 July 2019		
Josep Cleries	Catalonia	–	Appointed	Junts	JxCat	Nationalists	4 May 2018		Left the PDeCAT in Aug. 2020.
Mirella Cortès	Barcelona	1	842,875	ERC	ERC–Sob	ERC–EHB	10 November 2019		
Antonio Cosculluela	Huesca	1	38,650	PSA	PSOE	Socialists	10 November 2019		
Manuel Cruz	Barcelona	1	633,890	PSC	PSOE	Socialists	10 November 2019		
Miguel Dalmau	Zaragoza	1	160,893	PSA	PSOE	Socialists	10 November 2019		
Bienvenido de Arriba	Salamanca	1	80,381	PPCyL	PP	People's	10 November 2019		
Manel de la Vega	Catalonia	–	Appointed	PSC	PSOE	Socialists	27 November 2019		
Félix de las Cuevas	Cantabria	3	87,274	PPC	PP	People's	10 November 2019		
Esther del Brío	Salamanca	3	69,663	PPCyL	PP	People's	10 November 2019		
María Delgado	Soria	2	15,175	PSCyL	PSOE	Socialists	10 November 2019		
Olivia Delgado	Tenerife	1	119,557	PSC	PSOE	Socialists	10 November 2019		
Javier de Lucas	Valencia	1	392,987	Indep.	PSOE	Socialists	10 November 2019		
María de Pablo	La Rioja	1	58,009	PSR	PSOE	Socialists	10 November 2019		
Fernando de Rosa	Valencia	1	392,210	PPCV	PP	People's	10 November 2019		
Francisco Díaz	Castile and León	–	Appointed	PSCyL	PSOE	Socialists	24 July 2019		
Raúl Díaz	La Rioja	–	Appointed	PSR	PSOE	Socialists	23 July 2019		
Elena Diego	Salamanca	1	57,000	PSCyL	PSOE	Socialists	10 November 2019		
Ana Edo	Castellón	2	85,841	PSPV	PSOE	Socialists	10 November 2019		
Joaquín Egea	Teruel	1	20,686	TE		Mixed	10 November 2019		
Gorka Elejabarrieta	Gipuzkoa	1	102,759		EH Bildu	ERC–EHB	10 November 2019		
David Erguido	Madrid	–	Appointed	PPCM	PP	People's	11 July 2019		
Adelina Escandell	Catalonia	–	Appointed	ERC	ERC–Sob	ERC–EHB	27 November 2019		
Manuel Escarda	Valladolid	1	96,378	PSCyL	PSOE	Socialists	10 November 2019		
Alfonso Escudero	Cuenca	2	39,340	PSCM	PSOE	Socialists	10 November 2019		
Baldomero Espinosa	Badajoz	2	136,687	PSOE-E	PSOE	Socialists	10 November 2019		
Rafael Esteban	Guadalajara	1	42,048	PSCM	PSOE	Socialists	10 November 2019		
María Etxano	Biscay	2	222,904	EAJ/PNV		Basque	10 November 2019		
Alberto Fabra	Valencia	–	Appointed	PPCV	PP	People's	27 June 2019		
Francisco Fajardo	Lanzarote	1	15,400	PSC	PSOE	Socialists	10 November 2019		First Secretary.
Francisco Fernández	Ourense	3	64,233	PPdeG	PP	People's	10 November 2019		
Jesús Fernández	Castilla-La Mancha	–	Appointed	PSCM	PSOE	Socialists	23 July 2019		
José Fernández	Zamora	1	32,683	PSCyL	PSOE	Socialists	10 November 2019		
José Miguel Fernández	Cantabria	–	Appointed	PRC		Mixed	11 July 2019		
Manuel Fernández	Jaén	3	133,728	PSOE-A	PSOE	Socialists	10 November 2019		
María Fernández	Asturias	2	186,063	FSA	PSOE	Socialists	10 November 2019		
María Fernández	Palencia	3	34,261	PPCyL	PP	People's	10 November 2019		
Mercedes Fernández	Asturias	1	156,799	PPA	PP	People's	10 November 2019		
María Fernández	Cantabria	1	83,561	PSC	PSOE	Socialists	10 November 2019		
María Teresa Fernández	Castilla-La Mancha	–	Appointed	PSCM	PSOE	Socialists	23 July 2019		
Xoaquín Fernández	Galicia	–	Appointed	PSdeG	PSOE	Socialists	20 November 2019		
Antonio Ferrer	Madrid	2	962,347	PSOE-M	PSOE	Socialists	10 November 2019		
Carlos Floriano	Cáceres	1	70,218	PPE	PP	People's	10 November 2019		
Francisco Fragoso	Badajoz	1	110,538	PPE	PP	People's	10 November 2019		
Juan Francisco	Ourense	1	53,572	PSdeG	PSOE	Socialists	10 November 2019		
Sara Galván	Valladolid	2	94,597	PSCyL	PSOE	Socialists	10 November 2019		
María García	Granada	2	157,071	PSOE-A	PSOE	Socialists	10 November 2019	11 February 2020	Replaced by Abelardo Vico.
Pío García-Escudero	Madrid	1	1,226,205	PPCM	PP	People's	10 November 2019		Second Vice-President.
Javier Garcinuño	Cáceres	3	79,738	PSOE-E	PSOE	Socialists	10 November 2019		
María Garmendia	Gipuzkoa	2	117,205	EAJ/PNV		Basque	10 November 2019		
Ander Gil	Burgos	1	65,138	PSCyL	PSOE	Socialists	10 November 2019		President.
Juan Gilabert	Seville	3	348,890	PSOE-A	PSOE	Socialists	10 November 2019		
María Godoy	Badajoz	3	136,389	PSOE-E	PSOE	Socialists	10 November 2019		
Ruth Goñi	Navarre	1	102,988	Cs	NA+	Citizens	10 November 2019		
Ana González	La Rioja	1	61,779	PPR	PP	People's	10 November 2019		
Jesús González	Huelva	3	85,727	PSOE-A	PSOE	Socialists	10 November 2019		
José González	Guadalajara	2	40,310	PPCM	PP	People's	10 November 2019		
Josefa González	Huelva	2	88,887	PSOE-A	PSOE	Socialists	10 November 2019		
Pilar González Modino	Andalusia	–	Appointed		AA	Left (Note: Confederation of the Left: Adelante Andalucía–Més per Mallorca–Más Madrid–Coalició Compromís–Geroa Bai–Catalunya en Comú–Podem)	28 November 2019		
Sebastián González	Ávila	2	34,635	PPCyL	PP	People's	10 November 2019		
Jacobo González-Robatto	Andalusia	–	Appointed	Vox		Mixed	19 December 2019		
José Gregorio	Toledo	1	126,803	PPCM	PP	People's	10 November 2019		
Javier Guerra	Pontevedra	1	158,755	PPdeG	PP	People's	10 November 2019		
Antonio Gutiérrez	Seville	1	374,741	PSOE-A	PSOE	Socialists	10 November 2019		
María Heredia	Soria	1	16,299	PPCyL	PP	People's	10 November 2019		
Miguel Heredia	Málaga	1	227,084	PSOE-A	PSOE	Socialists	10 November 2019		
María Hernández	Seville	2	364,752	PSOE-A	PSOE	Socialists	10 November 2019		
Paloma Hernández	Fuerteventura	1	9,336	PSC	PSOE	Socialists	10 November 2019		
Rafael Hernando	Almería	1	102,428	PPA	PP	People's	10 November 2019		Third Secretary.
Mar Hormigo	Andalusia	–	Appointed	Cs	Cs	Citizens	7 February 2019		
Amaro Huelva	Huelva	1	91,662	PSOE-A	PSOE	Socialists	10 November 2019		
Juan Imbroda	Melilla	1	10,163	PP	PP	People's	10 November 2019		
Juan Juncal	A Coruña	2	188,448	PPdeG	PP	People's	10 November 2019		
Francisco Lacalle	Burgos	1	67,878	PPCyL	PP	People's	10 November 2019		
Imanol Landa	Biscay	3	220,156	EAJ/PNV		Basque	10 November 2019		Second Secretary.
José Ignacio Landaluce	Cádiz	1	154,115	PPA	PP	People's	10 November 2019		
Amaya Landín	Cantabria	2	97,872	PPC	PP	People's	10 November 2019		
Fernando Lastra	Asturias	3	180,622	FSA	PSOE	Socialists	10 November 2019		
José Latorre	Jaén	2	135,192	PSOE-A	PSOE	Socialists	10 November 2019		
Rafael Lemus	Extremadura	–	Appointed	PSOE-E	PSOE	Socialists	19 July 2019		
Joan Lerma	Valencia	–	Appointed	PSPV	PSOE	Socialists	27 June 2019		
Carmen Leyte	Ourense	2	66,682	PPdeG	PP	People's	10 November 2019		
Julia Liberal Liberal	Álava	1	37,204	PSE-EE	PSOE	Socialists	10 November 2019		
Pilar Llop	Madrid	–	Appointed	PSOE-M	PSOE	Socialists	11 July 2019		
Fernando López	Andalusia	–	Appointed	PSOE-A	PSOE	Socialists	12 September 2019		
Jordi López	Menorca	1	10,406	PPIB	PP	People's	10 November 2019		
María Teresa López	Castile and León	–	Appointed	PSCyL	PSOE	Socialists	24 July 2019		
Miguel Lorenzo	A Coruña	1	197,532	PPdeG	PP	People's	10 November 2019		
María Luna	Córdoba	1	147,838	PSOE-A	PSOE	Socialists	10 November 2019		
María Macías	Badajoz	1	141,687	PSOE-E	PSOE	Socialists	10 November 2019		
Antonio Magdalena	Navarre	1	82,809	PSN	PSOE	Socialists	10 November 2019		
Tomás Marcos	Madrid	–	Appointed	Cs	Cs	Citizens	11 July 2019		
José Vicente Marí	Balearics	–	Appointed	PPIB	PP	People's	12 July 2019		
José Marín	Murcia	1	182,638	Vox		Mixed	10 November 2019		
Javier Maroto	Castile and León	–	Appointed	PPCyL	PP	People's	24 July 2019		
Francisco Márquez	Jaén	1	140,337	PPA	PP	People's	10 November 2019		
Jordi Martí	Girona	1	116,664	ERC	ERC–Sob	ERC–EHB	10 November 2019		
Beatriz Martín	Teruel	2	19,060	TE		Mixed	10 November 2019		
Estefanía Martín	Málaga	2	220,436	PSOE-A	PSOE	Socialists	10 November 2019		
Jesús Martín	Ciudad Real	1	92,472	PSCM	PSOE	Socialists	10 November 2019		
Juan Martín	Ávila	1	37,865	PPCyL	PP	People's	10 November 2019		
María Martín	Zamora	3	33,423	PPCyL	PP	People's	10 November 2019		
Ana Martínez	Alicante	2	238,631	PSPV	PSOE	Socialists	10 November 2019		
Fernando Martínez	Almería	1	87,519	PSOE-A	PSOE	Socialists	10 November 2019		
Gerardo Martínez	Soria	2	16,060	PPCyL	PP	People's	10 November 2019		
Jorge Martínez	Palencia	2	37,375	PPCyL	PP	People's	10 November 2019		
María Martínez	Cuenca	2	40,732	PPCM	PP	People's	10 November 2019		
Vicente Martínez	Castellón	2	83,915	PPCV	PP	People's	10 November 2019		
Fernando Martínez-Maíllo	Zamora	1	36,025	PPCyL	PP	People's	10 November 2019		
Koldo Martínez	Navarre	–	Appointed	Zabaltzen	GB	Left	27 September 2019		
Robert Masih	Barcelona	3	620,703	ERC	ERC–Sob	ERC–EHB	10 November 2019		
Jami Matamala	Girona	1	110,351	Junts	JxCat	Nationalists	10 November 2019		Left the PDeCAT in Aug. 2020.
Rodrigo Mediavilla	Palencia	1	38,609	PPCyL	PP	People's	10 November 2019		
Juan Medina	Álava	2	41,447	EAJ/PNV		Basque	10 November 2019		
Pedro Meneses	Tenerife	2	112,327	PSC	PSOE	Socialists	10 November 2019		
Carmen Mínguez	Ciudad Real	2	90,374	PSCM	PSOE	Socialists	10 November 2019		
Manuel Miranda	Albacete	1	69,892	PSCM	PSOE	Socialists	10 November 2019		
César Mogo	Lugo	1	55,284	PSdeG	PSOE	Socialists	10 November 2019		
Susanna Moll	Mallorca	2	87,196	PSIB	PSOE	Socialists	10 November 2019		
José Antonio Monago	Extremadura	–	Appointed	PPE	PP	People's	19 July 2019		
Pedro Montalvo	La Rioja	2	55,876	PSR	PSOE	Socialists	10 November 2019		
Ramón Morales	Gran Canaria	1	117,441	PSC	PSOE	Socialists	10 November 2019		
María Morán	León	2	86,327	PSCyL	PSOE	Socialists	10 November 2019		
María Moreno	Cáceres	2	82,280	PSOE-E	PSOE	Socialists	10 November 2019		
Rubén Moreno	Valencia	2	369,835	PPCV	PP	People's	10 November 2019		
Alfonso Moscoso	Cádiz	2	174,324	PSOE-A	PSOE	Socialists	10 November 2019		
Carles Mulet	Valencia	–	Appointed	IdPV	Compromís	Left	27 June 2019		
Alfonso Muñoz	Córdoba	2	140,768	PSOE-A	PSOE	Socialists	10 November 2019		
Ángeles Muñoz	Málaga	1	218,244	PPA	PP	People's	10 November 2019		
David Muñoz	Ceuta	1	10,071	PP	PP	People's	10 November 2019		
Elena Muñoz	Galicia	–	Appointed	PPdeG	PP	People's	20 November 2019		
Montserrat Muro	Toledo	2	115,444	PSCM	PSOE	Socialists	10 November 2019		
Miguel Nacarino	Cáceres	1	83,271	PSOE-E	PSOE	Socialists	10 November 2019		
Cristina Narbona	Madrid	1	1,058,583	PSOE-M	PSOE	Socialists	10 November 2019		First Vice-President.
Micaela Navarro	Jaén	1	140,844	PSOE-A	PSOE	Socialists	10 November 2019		
Txema Oleaga	Biscay	1	120,371	PSE-EE	PSOE	Socialists	10 November 2019		
Félix Ortega	Toledo	1	117,567	PSCM	PSOE	Socialists	10 November 2019		
Almuden Otaola	Álava	1	44,409	EAJ/PNV		Basque	10 November 2019		
María Otero	Asturias	–	Appointed	FSA	PSOE	Socialists	28 November 2019		
Gonzalo Palacín	Huesca	3	35,791	PSA	PSOE	Socialists	10 November 2019		
Marta Pascal	Catalonia	–	Appointed	PDeCAT	JxCat	Nationalists	4 May 2018	4 March 2020	Resigned to join the PNC.
María Adelaida Pedrosa	Alicante	2	247,328	PPCV	PP	People's	10 November 2019		
Rosa Peral	Álava	3	40,414	EAJ/PNV		Basque	10 November 2019		
Borja Pérez	La Palma	1	12,735	PPC	PP	People's	10 November 2019		
Elisenda Pérez	Girona	2	104,529	ERC	ERC–Sob	ERC–EHB	10 November 2019		
Pablo Pérez	Segovia	2	32,245	PPCyL	PP	People's	10 November 2019		
Bernat Picornell	Catalonia	–	Appointed	ERC	ERC–Sob	ERC–EHB	4 May 2018		
Inés María Plaza García	Almería	2	85,827	PSOE-A	PSOE	Socialists	10 November 2019		
Luis Plaza	Valladolid	2	108,906	PPCyL	PP	People's	10 November 2019		
María Carmen Isabel Pobo	Teruel	2	19,820	PPA	PP	People's	10 November 2019		
Modesto Pose	Pontevedra	1	164,705	PSdeG	PSOE	Socialists	10 November 2019		
Salomé Pradas	Castellón	1	88,350	PPCV	PP	People's	10 November 2019		
Fernando Priego	Córdoba	1	130,900	PPA	PP	People's	10 November 2019		
Javier Puente	Cantabria	1	102,966	PPC	PP	People's	10 November 2019		
Artemi Rallo	Castellón	1	87,092	PSPV	PSOE	Socialists	10 November 2019		
Pedro Ramos	Canaries	–	Appointed	PSC	PSOE	Socialists	31 July 2019		
Sergio Ramos	Gran Canaria	1	97,298	PPC	PP	People's	10 November 2019		
Lourdes Retuerto	Murcia	–	Appointed	PSRM	PSOE	Socialists	20 July 2019		
Mayte Rivero	Lleida	1	53,691	Junts	JxCat	Nationalists	10 November 2019		Left the PDeCAT in Aug. 2020.
Gonzalo Robles	Salamanca	2	76,978	PPCyL	PP	People's	10 November 2019		
José Robles	Granada	1	139,361	PPA	PP	People's	10 November 2019		
Patricia Rodríguez	Ávila	3	33,419	PPCyL	PP	People's	10 November 2019		
Ramón Rodríguez	Albacete	2	70,869	PPCM	PP	People's	10 November 2019		
Tontxu Rodríguez	Basque Country	–	Appointed	PSE-EE	PSOE	Socialists	15 December 2016		
Luis Rodríguez-Comendador	Almería	2	98,213	PPA	PP	People's	10 November 2019		
Pilar Rojo	Pontevedra	2	154,434	PPdeG	PP	People's	10 November 2019		
Donelia Roldán	Albacete	2	67,625	PSCM	PSOE	Socialists	10 November 2019		
Lorena Roldán	Catalonia	–	Appointed	Cs	Cs	Citizens	4 May 2018		
Pedro Rollán	Madrid	2	1,153,526	PPCM	PP	People's	10 November 2019		
Antonio Román	Guadalajara	1	43,281	PPCM	PP	People's	10 November 2019		
Juan Ros	Ceuta	1	11,284	Vox		Mixed	10 November 2019		
Eduardo Rubiño	Madrid	–	Appointed	MM		Left	11 July 2019	12 July 2021	Replaced by Pablo Perpinyà.
Luisa Rudi	Aragon	–	Appointed	PPA	PP	People's	6 September 2019		
Josep Rufà	Tarragona	3	104,835	ERC	ERC–Sob	ERC–EHB	10 November 2019		
Víctor Ruiz	Zaragoza	3	151,378	PSA	PSOE	Socialists	10 November 2019		
Teresa Ruiz-Sillero	Andalusia	–	Appointed	PPA	PP	People's	7 February 2019		
Pablo Ruz	Alicante	1	262,256	PPCV	PP	People's	10 November 2019		
Amelia Salanueva	Navarre	2	104,424	PPN	NA+	People's	10 November 2019		
María Salom	Mallorca	1	93,266	PPIB	PP	People's	10 November 2019		
José Sánchez	Huelva	2	54,564	PPA	PP	People's	10 November 2019		
Miguel Sánchez	Murcia	–	Appointed	Cs	Cs	Citizens	20 July 2019		
Clemente Sánchez-Garnica	Aragon	–	Appointed	PAR		Mixed	6 September 2019		
Saturnina Santana	Gran Canaria	2	111,576	PSC	PSOE	Socialists	10 November 2019		
Carlota Santiago	Madrid	–	Appointed	Cs	Cs	Citizens	11 July 2019		
Javier Santiago	León	2	85,666	PPCyL	PP	People's	10 November 2019		
José Luis Sanz	Seville	1	256,950	PPA	PP	People's	10 November 2019		
Juan Sanz	Segovia	3	27,943	PPCyL	PP	People's	10 November 2019		
Paloma Sanz	Segovia	1	33,340	PPCyL	PP	People's	10 November 2019		
Antonio Serrano	Albacete	1	74,357	PPCM	PP	People's	10 November 2019		
María Serrano	Córdoba	3	140,252	PSOE-A	PSOE	Socialists	10 November 2019		
Riansares Serrano	Guadalajara	2	40,295	PSCM	PSOE	Socialists	10 November 2019		
Rosa Serrano	Huesca	2	36,686	PSA	PSOE	Socialists	10 November 2019		
Antonio Silván	León	1	85,627	PPCyL	PP	People's	10 November 2019		
Ana María Surra	Barcelona	2	711,195	ERC	ERC–Sob	ERC–EHB	10 November 2019		
Violante Tomás	Murcia	1	247,098	PPRM	PP	People's	10 November 2019		
Carmen Torralba	Cuenca	1	40,372	PSCM	PSOE	Socialists	10 November 2019		
José Tortosa	Cuenca	1	41,754	PPCM	PP	People's	10 November 2019		
Luke Uribe-Etxebarria	Gipuzkoa	3	115,120	EAJ/PNV		Basque	10 November 2019		
María Vaquero	Gipuzkoa	1	120,481	EAJ/PNV		Basque	10 November 2019		
Manuel Varela	Lugo	3	65,672	PPdeG	PP	People's	10 November 2019		
Antonio Vázquez	A Coruña	1	185,015	PSdeG	PSOE	Socialists	10 November 2019		
Jesús Vázquez	Galicia	–	Appointed	PPdeG	PP	People's	20 November 2019		
Juan Vázquez	Murcia	2	235,078	PPRM	PP	People's	10 November 2019		
Miguel Vázquez	Andalusia	–	Appointed	PSOE-A	PSOE	Socialists	7 February 2019		
Cándida Verdier	Cádiz	3	171,797	PSOE-A	PSOE	Socialists	10 November 2019		
Abelardo Vico	Granada	–	–	PSOE-A	PSOE	Socialists			Replaces María García.
Salvador Vidal	León	1	88,069	PSCyL	PSOE	Socialists	10 November 2019		
Vicenç Vidal	Balearics	–	Appointed	PSM	Més	Left	12 July 2019		
Sara Vilà	Catalonia	–	Appointed	ICV	UP	Left	4 May 2018		
Ana Villar	Zaragoza	2	157,873	PSA	PSOE	Socialists	10 November 2019		
Miguel Viso	Ourense	1	68,349	PPdeG	PP	People's	10 November 2019		
Carlos Yécora	La Rioja	2	59,582	PPR	PP	People's	10 November 2019		
Alejandro Zubeldia	Granada	1	160,596	PSOE-A	PSOE	Socialists	10 November 2019		

== See also ==
- 14th Cortes Generales
- 14th Congress of Deputies

== Bibliography ==
- "Otras Disposiciones: Junta Electoral Provinciales – Elecciones generales. Proclamación de candidaturas" (PDF). Boletín Oficial del Estado (in Spanish). No. 248. Madrid, Spain: Government of Spain. 15 October 2019. pp. 113461–113748. ISSN 0212-033X.
- "Otras Disposiciones: Junta Electoral Central – Elecciones generales. Resultados" (PDF). Boletín Oficial del Estado (in Spanish). No. 289. Madrid, Spain: Government of Spain. 2 December 2019. pp. 132125–132133. ISSN 0212-033X.
