= Zenzano =

- Populated place
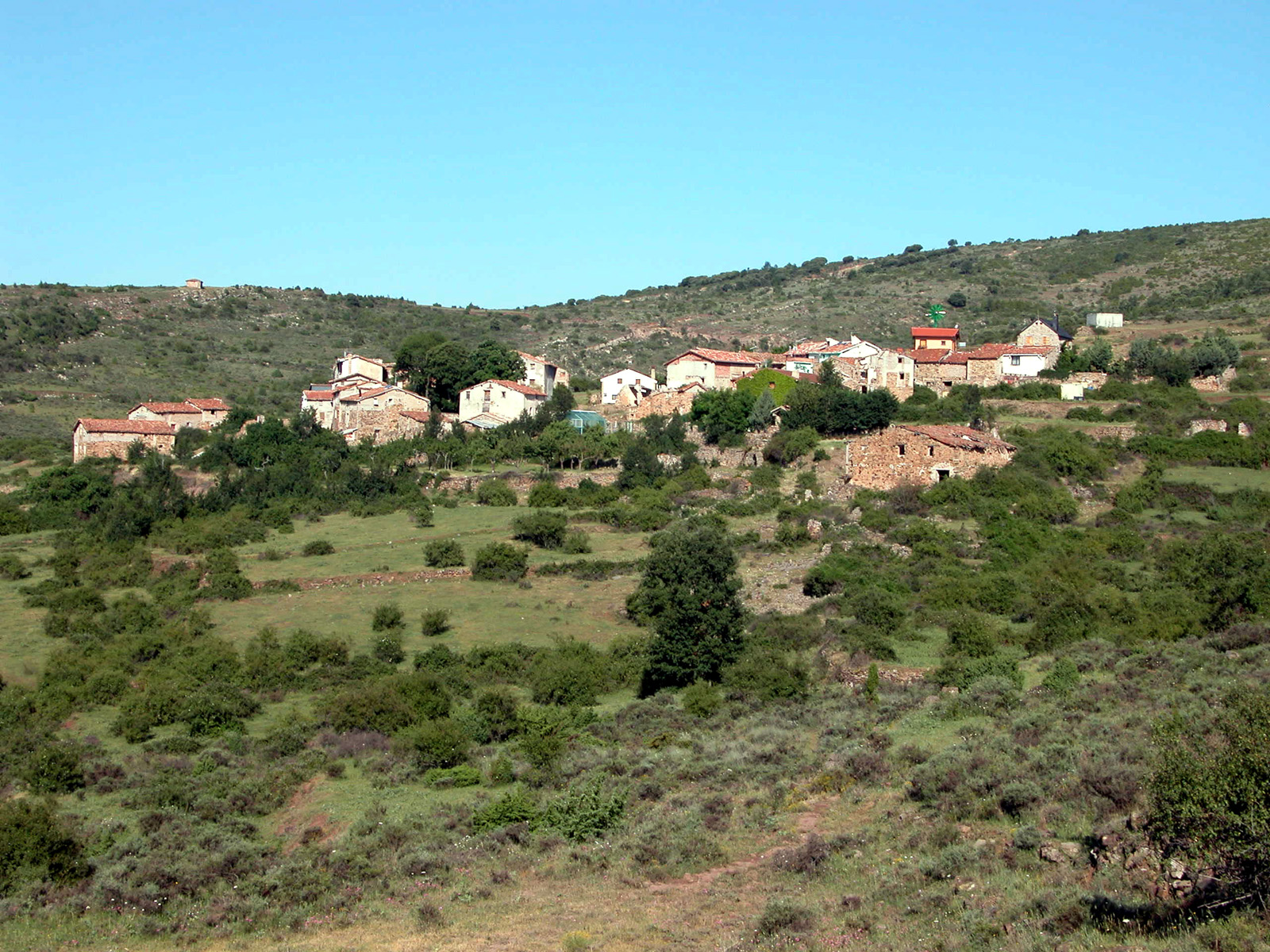
- View of Zenzano.

- Location within La Rioja, Spain Location within Spain
- Country: Spain
- Autonomous community: La Rioja
- Comarca: Logroño

Population
  - Total: 12
- Postal code: 26131

Zenzano is a village in the municipality of Lagunilla del Jubera, in the province and autonomous community of La Rioja, Spain. As of 2018, it had a population of 12 people.

== Employment and trade during the 20th century ==
In the last century, Zenzano was a town that, during its existence, was always dedicated exclusively to the agriculture of wheat, barley and oats (i.e., basic necessities for survival). As for livestock, it was always a town dedicated to goat and sheep farming, according to some of its neighbors.

== Human geography ==
In this census, it was called Villanueva de San Prudencio: 1842. Between the 1981 census and the previous one, this municipality disappeared because it was integrated into the municipality 26083 (Lagunilla del Jubera).
