= Antonio Silván =

Spanish politician (born 1962)

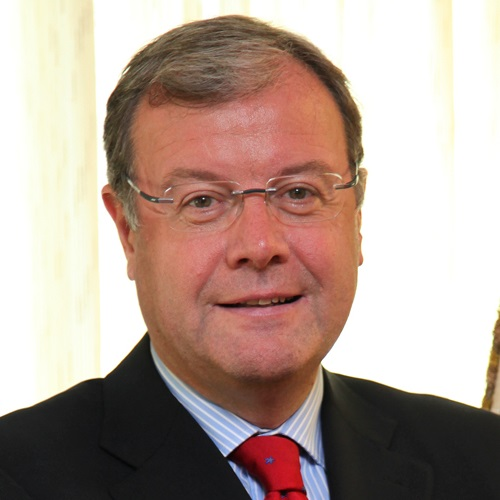
- Silván in 2017

Member of the Senate
- Incumbent
- Assumed office 10 November 2019
- Constituency: León

Personal details
- Born: 9 June 1962 (age 64)
- Party: People's Party

Antonio Silván Rodríguez (born 9 June 1962) is a Spanish politician serving as a member of the Senate since 2019. From 2015 to 2019, he served as mayor of León.
