= Paloma Hernández =

Spanish politician (born 1981)

Member of the Senate
- Incumbent
- Assumed office 28 April 2019
- Constituency: Fuerteventura

Personal details
- Born: 30 October 1981 (age 44)
- Party: Spanish Socialist Workers' Party

Paloma Hernández Cerezo (born 30 October 1981) is a Spanish politician serving as a member of the Senate since 2019. From 2015 to 2019, she served as councillor for tourism, beaches and public health of Puerto del Rosario.
