= Palencia (Senate constituency) =

Constituency of the Senate of Spain

Coordinates: 42°25′N 4°30′W

- Senate of Spain; Electoral constituency
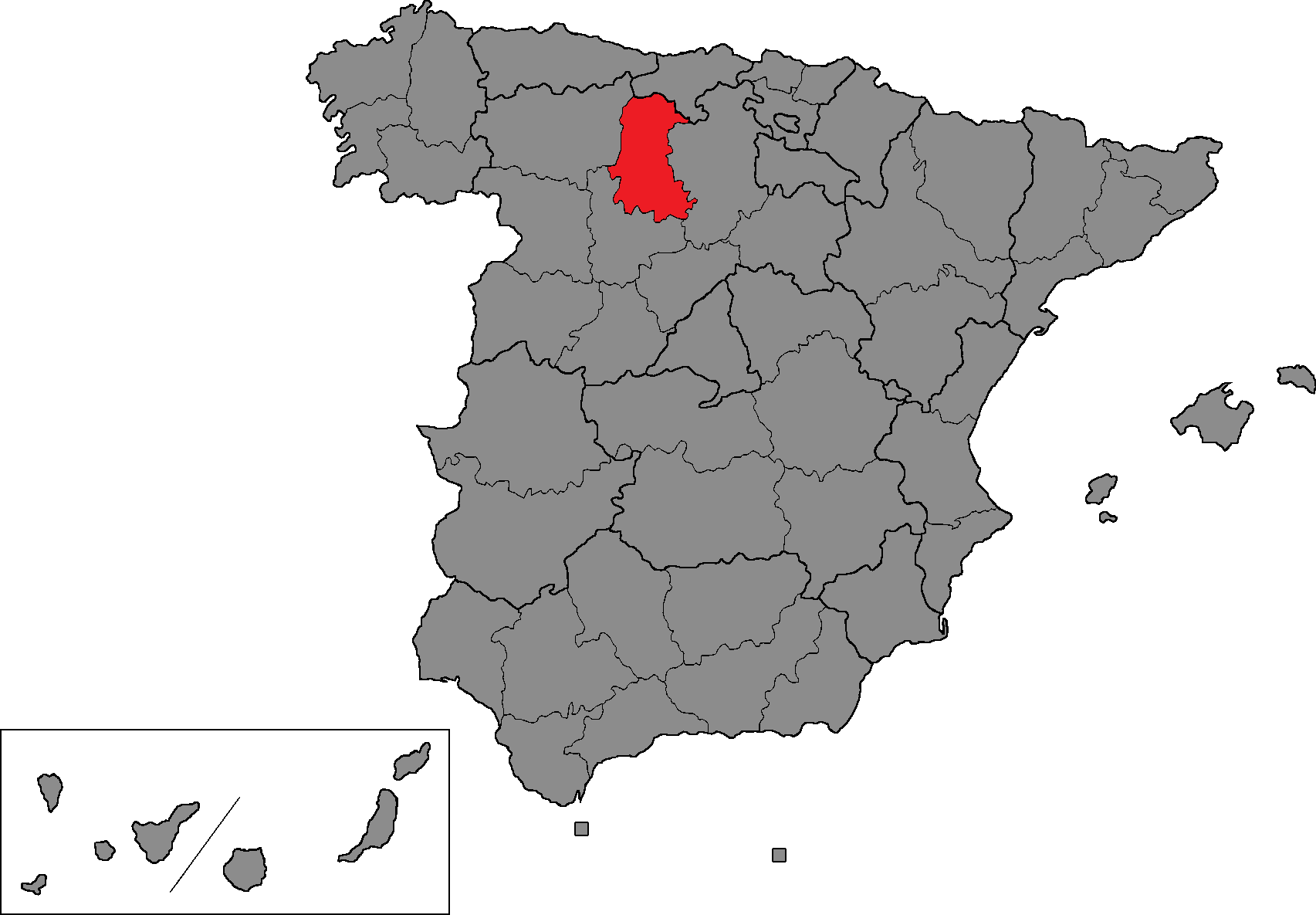
- Location of Palencia within Spain
- Province: Palencia
- Autonomous community: Castile and León
- Population: ▲158,115 (2024)
- Electorate: ▼137,642 (2023)
- Major settlements: Palencia

Current constituency
- Created: 1977
- Seats: 4
- Members: PP (3); PSOE (1)

Palencia is one of the 60 constituencies represented in the Senate of Spain, the upper chamber of the Spanish parliament, the Cortes Generales. The constituency (whose boundaries correspond to those of the homonymous province) elects four senators. The electoral system uses open-list (Note: Parties can group candidates into lists, although each candidate is treated separately for the purpose of the voting procedure.) partial block voting, with electors voting for individual candidates instead of parties. Electors can vote for up to three candidates.

== Electoral system ==
The constituency was created as per the Political Reform Law and was first contested in the 1977 general election. The Law provided for the provinces of Spain to be established as multi-member districts in the Senate, with this regulation being maintained under the Spanish Constitution of 1978. Additionally, the Constitution requires for any modification of the provincial limits to be approved under an organic law, needing an absolute majority in the Cortes Generales.

Voting is based on universal suffrage, comprising all Spanish nationals over 18 years of age with full political rights, provided that they have not been deprived of the right to vote by a final sentence. The only exception was in 1977, when this was limited to nationals over 21 years of age and in full enjoyment of their political and civil rights. Amendments in 2011 required non-resident citizens to apply for voting, a system known as "begged" voting (Spanish: Voto rogado). which was abolished in 2022. Further, amendments in 2018 granted the right to vote to those legally incapacitated. 209 Senate seats (207 in 1977, 208 from 1978 to 2026) are elected using open-list partial block voting: voters in constituencies electing four seats can choose up to three candidates; in those with two or three seats, up to two; and in single-member districts, one. Each of the 47 peninsular provinces is allocated four seats, while in insular provinces—such as the Balearic and Canary Islands—the districts are the islands themselves, with the larger ones (Mallorca, Gran Canaria and Tenerife) being allocated three seats each, and the smaller ones (Menorca, Ibiza, Formentera, Fuerteventura, La Gomera, El Hierro, Lanzarote and La Palma) one each. (Note: La Gomera and El Hierro comprised a single constituency for the 1977 election. A constitutional reform in 2026 awarded Formentera an independent senator separate from Ibiza.) Ceuta and Melilla elect two seats each. Until 1985, the law also provided for by-elections to fill Senate seats vacated up to two years into the legislature; subsequently, any vacancies arising after the proclamation of candidates and during the legislative term are filled by the next candidates on the party lists or, when required, by designated substitutes.

The electoral law allows for parties and federations registered in the interior ministry, alliances and groupings of electors to present lists of candidates. Parties and federations intending to form an alliance are required to inform the relevant electoral commission within 10 days of the election call—15 before 1985—whereas groupings of electors need to secure the signature of at least one percent of the electorate in the constituencies for which they seek election—one permille of the electorate, with a compulsory minimum of 500 signatures, until 1985—disallowing electors from signing for more than one list. Also since 2011, parties, federations or alliances that have not obtained a mandate in either chamber of the Cortes at the preceding election are required to secure the signature of at least 0.1 percent of electors in the aforementioned constituencies. Amendments in 2007 required a balanced composition of men and women in the electoral lists, so that candidates of either sex made up at least 40 percent of the total composition; further amendments in 2024 required the use of a zipper system.

== Senators ==
Senators for Palencia 1977–
Key to parties PSOE UCD PP CP AP
Legislature	Election	Distribution
Constituent	1977	1 / 3
1st	1979	1 / 3
2nd	1982	3 / 1
3rd	1986	2 / 2
4th	1989	1 / 3
5th	1993	1 / 3
6th	1996	1 / 3
7th	2000	1 / 3
8th	2004	1 / 3
9th	2008	1 / 3
10th	2011	1 / 3
11th	2015	1 / 3
12th	2016	1 / 3
13th	2019 (Apr)	2 / 2
14th	2019 (Nov)	1 / 3
15th	2023	1 / 3

== General elections ==
=== 2023 ===
Summary of the 23 July 2023 Senate of Spain election results
Candidates	Parties and coalitions	Popular vote	
Candidates	Parties and coalitions	Votes	%
Jorge Domingo Martínez Antolín	PP	40,209	43.02
Carlos Alfonso Polanco Rebolleda	PP	38,797	41.51
María José Ortega Gómez	PP	38,690	41.39
Rosa María Aldea Gómez	PSOE	34,272	36.66
• Jesús Manuel López Infante	PSOE	31,633	33.84
• Fernando Eulogio Hernández Portela	PSOE	30,294	32.41
• Ricardo Carrancio Sangrador	Vox	10,441	11.17
• Yenifer Fernández Calleja	Vox	9,482	10.14
• Carolina González Camino	Vox	9,173	9.81
• Ester Becerril Fernández	Sumar	6,672	7.13
• Alberto Riol de Prado	Sumar	5,070	5.42
• Manuel Fidel Ramos Ibáñez	VP	3,158	3.37
• María Victoria Díaz Arranz	EV	1,125	1.20
• Natalia Martínez Antolín	PACMA	795	0.85
• Alejandro Rojo Trigueros	EV	680	0.72
• Rubén Cabezón Milla	PCTE	365	0.39
• Marta Fernández Calvo	PUM+J	346	0.37
• Julio César de Alaíz Martínez	FE de las JONS	243	0.25
• David Caballero Merino	Recortes Cero	147	0.15
• María Montserrat González Martín	CJ	122	0.13
• Óscar Córdova Molina	CJ	54	0.05
Blank ballots		1,863	1.99
Total		266,095	
Valid votes		93,464	97.25
Invalid votes		2,642	2.74
Votes cast / turnout		96,106	74.59
Abstentions		32,732	25.40
Registered voters		128,838	

=== November 2019 ===
Summary of the 10 November 2019 Senate of Spain election results in Palencia
Candidates	Parties and coalitions	Popular vote	
Candidates	Parties and coalitions	Votes	%
Rodrigo Mediavilla Pérez	PP	38,609	41.01
Jorge Domingo Martínez Antolín	PP	37,375	39.70
María del Carmen Fernández Caballero	PP	34,261	36.39
Rosa María Aldea Gómez	PSOE	31,890	33.87
• Eduardo Santiago Calleja	PSOE	30,669	32.58
• Gema Sanfélix Boubeta	PSOE	30,051	31.92
• Luis Javier Zurro Hernández	Vox	12,071	12.82
• Luis Álvaro Villoldo Pelayo	Podemos–IU	7,654	8.13
• Elena León Hernández	Cs	7,353	7.81
• Rosa María Rebolledo Manuel	Podemos–IU	7,339	7.80
• Eduardo Velázquez Martín	Podemos–IU	6,451	6.85
• Juan José Espegel Morte	Cs	5,941	6.31
• María Llorente Tejedor	Cs	5,498	5.84
• Alba García Roldán	PACMA	1,235	1.31
• Florencio Blas Benito	PACMA	720	0.76
• Ernesto Miguel Nungesser Luengo	R. Cero–GV–PCAS–TC	616	0.65
• José Ignacio García Valdecasas Medina	PUM+J	513	0.54
• Julio César de Alaiz Martínez	FE–JONS	367	0.39
Blank ballots		2,268	2.41
Total		94,143	
Valid votes		94,143	97.40
Invalid votes		2,513	2.60
Votes cast / turnout		96,656	68.39
Abstentions		44,665	31.61
Registered voters		141,321	

== Bibliography ==
- Ley 1/1977, de 4 de enero, para la Reforma Política (Fundamental Law 1/1977). Official State Gazette (in Spanish). 4 January 1977. BOE-A-1977-165.
- Real Decreto-ley 20/1977, de 18 de marzo, sobre Normas Electorales (Royal Decree-Law 20/1977). Official State Gazette (in Spanish). 18 March 1977. BOE-A-1977-7445.
- Constitución Española (Constitution). Official State Gazette (in Spanish). 27 December 1978. BOE-A-1978-31229.
- Ley Orgánica 5/1985, de 19 de junio, del Régimen Electoral General (Organic Law 5/1985). Official State Gazette (in Spanish). 19 June 1985. BOE-A-1985-11672.
- Carreras de Odriozola, Albert; Tafunell Sambola, Xavier (2005) [1989]. Estadísticas históricas de España, siglos XIX-XX (PDF) (in Spanish). Vol. 1 (II ed.). Bilbao: Fundación BBVA. pp. 1072–1097. ISBN 84-96515-00-1. Archived from the original (PDF) on 24 September 2015.
