= Julia Liberal Liberal =

Spanish politician

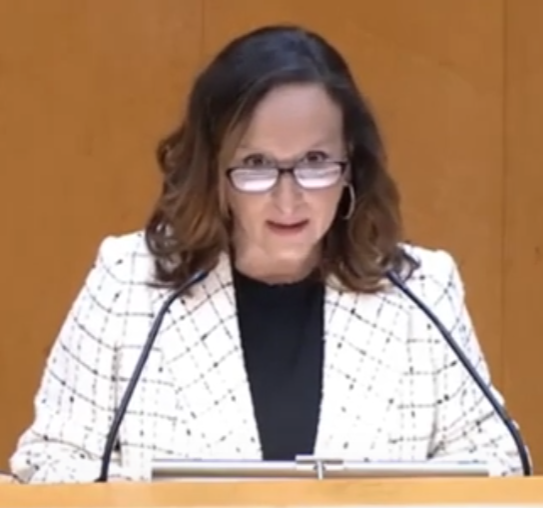
- Speaking at a plenary session in 2020

Member of the Senate of Spain
- Incumbent
- Assumed office 2019
- Constituency: Álava

Personal details
- Born: 1967 (age 57–58)
- Political party: Spanish Socialist Workers' Party

Julia María Liberal Liberal (born 1967) is a Spanish politician from the Spanish Socialist Workers' Party. She has been a member of the Senate of Spain for Álava since 2019.

== See also ==
- 14th Senate of Spain
- 15th Senate of Spain
