= Ourense (Senate constituency) =

Senate constituency in Spain

Coordinates: 42°10′N 7°30′W

- Senate of Spain; Electoral constituency
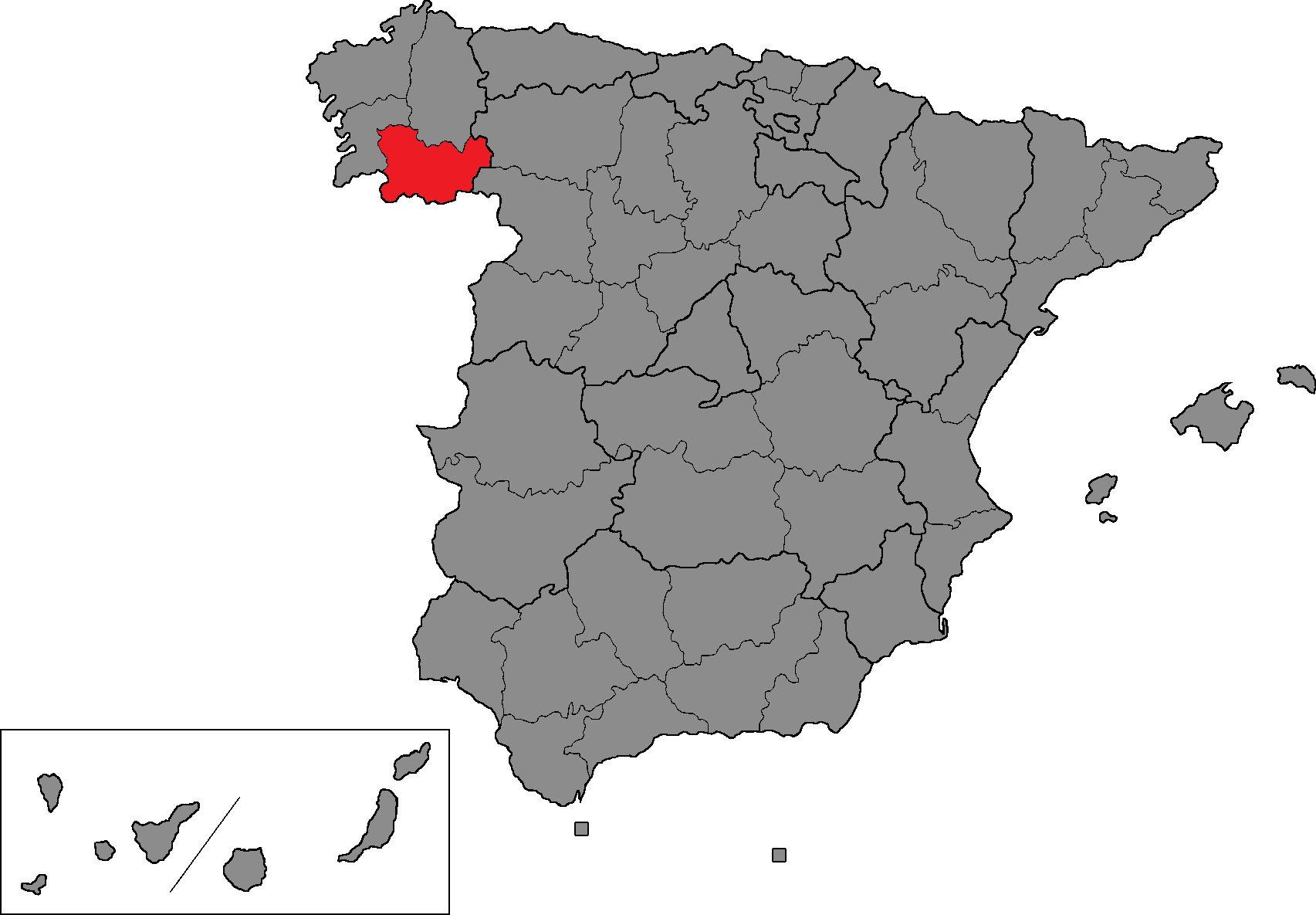
- Location of Ourense within Spain
- Province: Ourense
- Autonomous community: Galicia
- Population: ▲304,592 (2024)
- Electorate: ▼355,765 (2023)
- Major settlements: Ourense

Current constituency
- Created: 1977
- Seats: 4
- Members: PP (3); PSOE (1)

Ourense is one of the 60 constituencies represented in the Senate of Spain, the upper chamber of the Spanish parliament, the Cortes Generales. The constituency (whose boundaries correspond to those of the homonymous province) elects four senators. The electoral system uses open-list (Note: Parties can group candidates into lists, although each candidate is treated separately for the purpose of the voting procedure.) partial block voting, with electors voting for individual candidates instead of parties. Electors can vote for up to three candidates.

== Electoral system ==
The constituency was created as per the Political Reform Law and was first contested in the 1977 general election. The Law provided for the provinces of Spain to be established as multi-member districts in the Senate, with this regulation being maintained under the Spanish Constitution of 1978. Additionally, the Constitution requires for any modification of the provincial limits to be approved under an organic law, needing an absolute majority in the Cortes Generales.

Voting is based on universal suffrage, comprising all Spanish nationals over 18 years of age with full political rights, provided that they have not been deprived of the right to vote by a final sentence. The only exception was in 1977, when this was limited to nationals over 21 years of age and in full enjoyment of their political and civil rights. Amendments in 2011 required non-resident citizens to apply for voting, a system known as "begged" voting (Spanish: Voto rogado). which was abolished in 2022. Further, amendments in 2018 granted the right to vote to those legally incapacitated. 209 Senate seats (207 in 1977, 208 from 1978 to 2026) are elected using open-list partial block voting: voters in constituencies electing four seats can choose up to three candidates; in those with two or three seats, up to two; and in single-member districts, one. Each of the 47 peninsular provinces is allocated four seats, while in insular provinces—such as the Balearic and Canary Islands—the districts are the islands themselves, with the larger ones (Mallorca, Gran Canaria and Tenerife) being allocated three seats each, and the smaller ones (Menorca, Ibiza, Formentera, Fuerteventura, La Gomera, El Hierro, Lanzarote and La Palma) one each. (Note: La Gomera and El Hierro comprised a single constituency for the 1977 election. A constitutional reform in 2026 awarded Formentera an independent senator separate from Ibiza.) Ceuta and Melilla elect two seats each. Until 1985, the law also provided for by-elections to fill Senate seats vacated up to two years into the legislature; subsequently, any vacancies arising after the proclamation of candidates and during the legislative term are filled by the next candidates on the party lists or, when required, by designated substitutes.

The electoral law allows for parties and federations registered in the interior ministry, alliances and groupings of electors to present lists of candidates. Parties and federations intending to form an alliance are required to inform the relevant electoral commission within 10 days of the election call—15 before 1985—whereas groupings of electors need to secure the signature of at least one percent of the electorate in the constituencies for which they seek election—one permille of the electorate, with a compulsory minimum of 500 signatures, until 1985—disallowing electors from signing for more than one list. Also since 2011, parties, federations or alliances that have not obtained a mandate in either chamber of the Cortes at the preceding election are required to secure the signature of at least 0.1 percent of electors in the aforementioned constituencies. Amendments in 2007 required a balanced composition of men and women in the electoral lists, so that candidates of either sex made up at least 40 percent of the total composition; further amendments in 2024 required the use of a zipper system.

== Senators ==
Senators for Ourense 1977–
Key to parties CDG PSOE UCD PP CP AP
Legislature	Election	Distribution
Constituent	1977	1 / 3
1st	1979	1 / 3
2nd	1982	1 / 3
3rd	1986	1 / 3
4th	1989	1 / 3
5th	1993	1 / 3
6th	1996	1 / 3
7th	2000	1 / 3
8th	2004	1 / 3
9th	2008	1 / 3
10th	2011	1 / 3
11th	2015	1 / 3
12th	2016	1 / 3
13th	2019 (Apr)	1 / 3
14th	2019 (Nov)	1 / 3
15th	2023	1 / 3

== General elections ==
=== 2023 ===
Summary of the 23 July 2023 Senate of Spain election results
Candidates	Parties and coalitions	Popular vote	
Candidates	Parties and coalitions	Votes	%
María del Carmen Leyte Coello	PP	84,654	48.92
Luis Menor Pérez	PP	83,530	48.27
Rosa María Sánchez Gándara	PP	81,727	47.23
Rafael Rodríguez Villarino	PSOE	50,579	29.23
• Miguel Bautista Carballo	PSOE	47,648	27.53
• María Alida Iglesias Gil	PSOE	46,404	26.81
• María Cristina Cid Fernández	BNG	19,813	11.45
• Xurxo Rodríguez Méndez	BNG	15,720	9.08
• Xosé Carballido Presas	BNG	14,321	8.27
• Manuel Nogueira Pérez	Sumar	10,482	6.05
• Lidia López Arteaga	Sumar	8,569	4.95
• Lilian Cerdeira Mosquera	Vox	6,848	3.95
• Carlos Alberto Garrido López	Sumar	6,485	3.74
• Domingo Benito Otero Besteiro	Vox	6,175	3.56
• Miguel Ángel Rojas Silva	Vox	5,881	3.39
• Margarita Pascal Misiti	PACMA	1,793	1.03
• Quique Rodríguez Portabales	PUM+J	457	0.26
• Adrián Nido García	PCTG	387	0.22
• Juan Diego Conde Eguileta	Recortes Cero	312	0.18
• María del Mar Fernández Dibuja	CCD	169	0.09
• Manuel Álvarez Fernández	CCD	97	0.05
• Bruno Blanco Tourón	CCD	68	0.03
Blank ballots		3,221	1.86
Total		495340	
Valid votes		173,026	97.38
Invalid votes		4,642	2.61
Votes cast / turnout		177,668	71.25
Abstentions		71,686	28.74
Registered voters		249354	

=== November 2019 ===
Summary of the 10 November 2019 Senate of Spain election results in Ourense
Candidates	Parties and coalitions	Popular vote	
Candidates	Parties and coalitions	Votes	%
Miguel Ángel Viso	PP	68,349	41.03
María del Carmen Leyte Coello	PP	66,682	40.03
Francisco José Fernández Pérez	PP	64,233	38.56
Juan Carlos Francisco Rivera	PSdeG–PSOE	53,572	32.16
• Marina Tallón Núñez	PSdeG–PSOE	51,248	30.76
• José Antonio Pérez Domínguez	PSdeG–PSOE	48,727	29.25
• Gloria María Viana Rivera	BNG	14,339	8.61
• Xosé Lois González Vázquez "O Carrabouxo"	BNG	12,944	7.77
• Alfonso Victor Ferreiro Outomuro	Podemos–EU	11,954	7.18
• Celsa Ferreiro Varela	Podemos–EU	10,759	6.46
• Julio Rodríguez Garrido	Vox	10,577	6.35
• Celso Sánchez González	BNG	10,362	6.22
• Manuel Nogueira Pérez	Podemos–EU	8,903	5.34
• Montserrat Lama Novoa	Cs	7,756	4.66
• Luis Garayzábal Pedrosa	Cs	5,888	3.53
• Marcos Chao Amaro	Cs	5,407	3.25
• Natalia Conde Gestido	PACMA	2,758	1.66
• Daniel Carrascosa Díez	PACMA	1,636	0.98
• Celia Rodríguez Rodríguez	Recortes Cero–GV	757	0.45
• Quique Rodríguez Portabales	PUM+J	728	0.44
• José Jesús Ramos Martínez	PCTG	615	0.37
Blank ballots		4,353	2.61
Total		166,599	
Valid votes		166,599	96.87
Invalid votes		5,383	3.13
Votes cast / turnout		171,982	47.73
Abstentions		188,320	52.27
Registered voters		360,302	

== Bibliography ==
- Ley 1/1977, de 4 de enero, para la Reforma Política (Fundamental Law 1/1977). Official State Gazette (in Spanish). 4 January 1977. BOE-A-1977-165.
- Real Decreto-ley 20/1977, de 18 de marzo, sobre Normas Electorales (Royal Decree-Law 20/1977). Official State Gazette (in Spanish). 18 March 1977. BOE-A-1977-7445.
- Constitución Española (Constitution). Official State Gazette (in Spanish). 27 December 1978. BOE-A-1978-31229.
- Ley Orgánica 5/1985, de 19 de junio, del Régimen Electoral General (Organic Law 5/1985). Official State Gazette (in Spanish). 19 June 1985. BOE-A-1985-11672.
- Carreras de Odriozola, Albert; Tafunell Sambola, Xavier (2005) [1989]. Estadísticas históricas de España, siglos XIX-XX (PDF) (in Spanish). Vol. 1 (II ed.). Bilbao: Fundación BBVA. pp. 1072–1097. ISBN 84-96515-00-1. Archived from the original (PDF) on 24 September 2015.
