= Miguel Ángel Viso =

Spanish politician (born 1971)

Member of the Senate
- In office 28 April 2019 – 29 May 2023
- Constituency: Ourense

Member of the Congress of Deputies
- In office 5 January 2016 – 5 March 2019
- Constituency: Ourense

Personal details
- Born: 9 October 1971 (age 54)
- Party: People's Party

Miguel Ángel Viso Diéguez (born 9 October 1971) is a Spanish politician serving as a member of the Parliament of Galicia since 2024. From 2019 to 2023, he was a member of the Senate. From 2016 to 2019, she was a member of the Congress of Deputies.
