= Rosa María Aldea Gómez =

Spanish politician (born 1970)

Member of the Senate
- Incumbent
- Assumed office 13 January 2016
- Constituency: Palencia

Personal details
- Born: 1 March 1970 (age 56)
- Party: Spanish Socialist Workers' Party

Rosa María Aldea Gómez (born 1 March 1970) is a Spanish politician serving as a member of the Senate since 2016. She has served as mayor of Cisneros since 2007.
