= Carlos Yécora =

Spanish politician (born 1981)

Member of the Senate
- Incumbent
- Assumed office 10 November 2019
- Constituency: La Rioja

Personal details
- Born: 31 May 1981 (age 45)
- Party: People's Party

Carlos Yécora Roca (born 31 May 1981) is a Spanish politician serving as a member of the Senate since 2019. He has served as mayor of Lagunilla del Jubera since 2019.
