= Robert Masih Nahar =

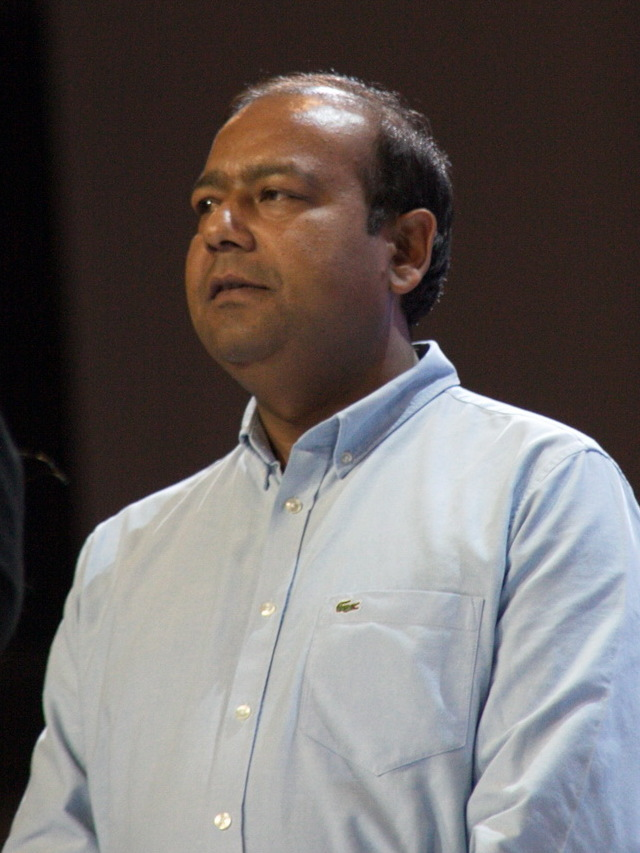

Robert Masih Nahar (born 5 September 1974) is an Indian-born Spanish politician from Catalonia. He became a member of the Senate of Spain in 2017.

== Life and career ==
Robert Masih Nahar was born Gurdaspur, Punjab on 5 September 1974.

He earned a degree in chemistry.

He moved to Barcelona in 2005. He started to promote cricket in Catalonia in 2009. He founded the Catalonia Cricket Club, the Union of Catalan Sport Cricket Clubs and the Catalan Cricket Federation. He is the first player, promoter of the sport and representative of the Catalan International Cricket Committee.

He acquired Spanish citizenship through marriage.

In 2017, he replaced the former judge Santiago Vidal as an ERC Senator.
