= Cristina Ayala (politician) =

Spanish politician

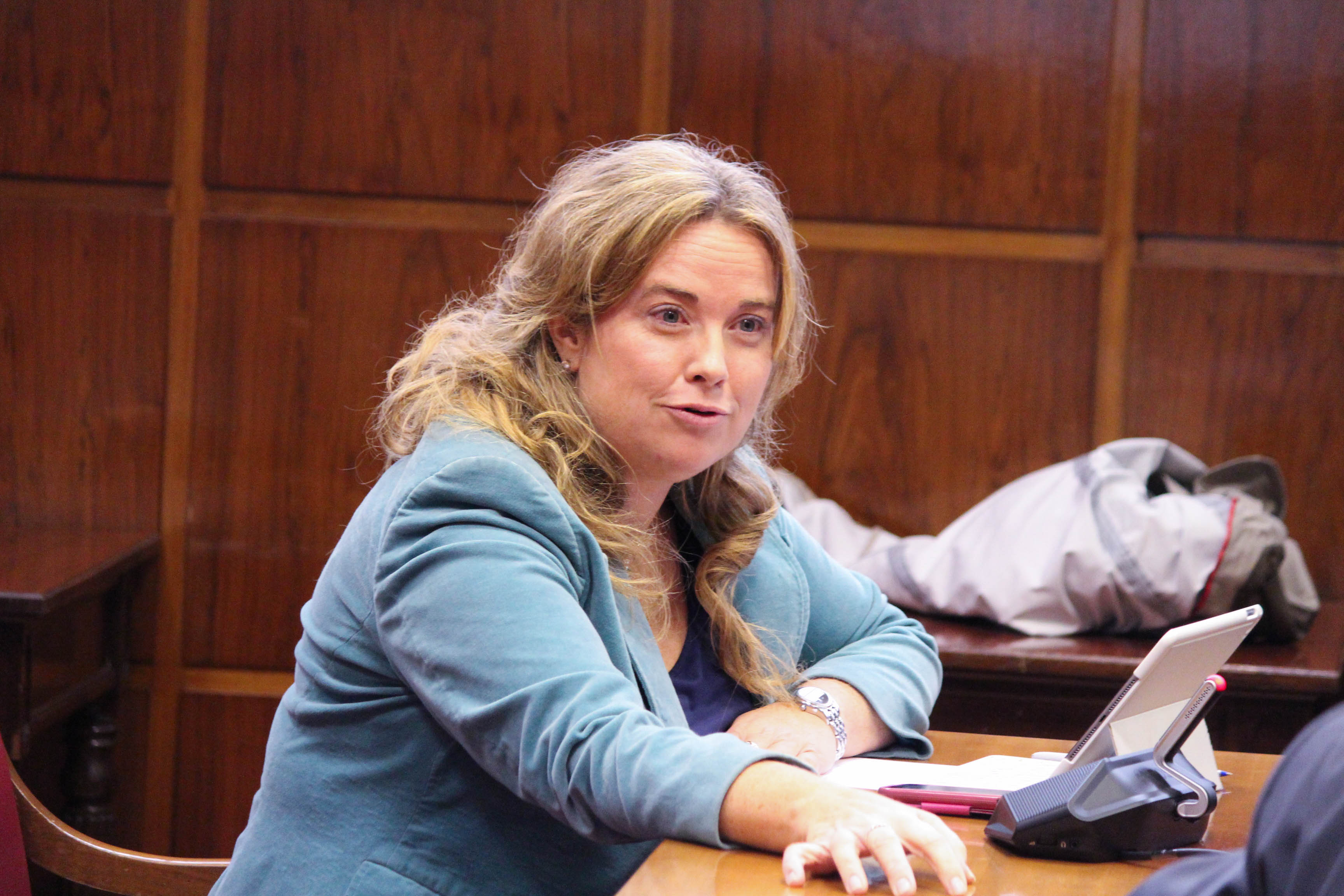

Mayor of Burgos
- Incumbent
- Assumed office 17 June 2023
- Preceded by: Daniel de la Rosa
- Succeeded by
Other offices
Senator
In office 26 June 2016 – 17 August 2023
Constituency	Burgos
Procurador of the Cortes of Castile and León
In office 27 May 2007 – 20 June 2015
Constituency	Burgos
Provincial Deputy of Burgos
In office 25 May 2003 – 27 May 2007
Councillor of the Burgos City Council
In office 17 June 2023 –

Personal details
- Born: 17 June 1972 (age 54) Burgos, Spain
- Party: People's Party

Cristina Ayala Santamaría (born 17 June 1972) is a Spanish People's Party (PP) politician. After serving as a city councillor in Burgos (2003–2007) and a deputy in the Cortes of Castile and León (2007–2015) she was elected to the Senate of Spain (2015–2023). She left this post upon being elected the first woman mayor of Burgos.

== Early and personal life ==
Born in Burgos in Castile and León, Ayala graduated with a law degree from the University of Burgos, and also obtained two master's degrees in environmental education and in local development. Before entering politics, she practiced law and was part of a group for rural development in Castrojeriz. As of 2022, she is married and has a son and a daughter.

== Political career ==
Ayala was voted onto her hometown's city council in 2003, on the People's Party (PP) list led by incoming mayor Juan Carlos Aparicio. She was elected a deputy of the Cortes of Castile and León in the 2007 and 2011 regional elections.

Ayala was elected to the Senate of Spain in the 2015 general election, as the PP took three of four seats in the Burgos constituency. In May 2016 she reimbursed part of her first month's pay – which had been authorised by the Senate – as it included unemployment benefits. She believed the payment to be an error. In November 2018, she was part of a senate commission investigating allegations of plagiarism in the doctoral thesis of the prime minister of Spain, Pedro Sánchez.

In January 2023, Ayala was named as the PP candidate for mayor of Burgos, the first woman in this position. She announced in April that she would leave the Senate if elected mayor. The incumbent Spanish Socialist Workers' Party (PSOE) was the most voted party with 12 of 27 seats, while the PP rose from 7 to 11, meaning it would govern if an agreement could be reached with the four councillors from Vox. The PP and Vox reached an agreement, with Vox leader Fernando Martínez-Acitores becoming deputy mayor and his party being put in charge of several areas of government. She was invested on 17 June as the first female mayor of Burgos.
