= José Marín Gascón =

Spanish politician

Spanish Senator
- Incumbent
- Assumed office 10 November 2019

Personal details
- Born: Jose Manuel Marin Gascón; 20 February 1960 (age 66) Madrid, Spain
- Party: Vox
- Education: University of Murcia

José Manuel Marín Gascón (born 20 February 1960 in Madrid) is a Spanish physician, professor and politician who is a directly elected Senator for the Vox party.

Marín Gascón holds a degree in medicine from the University of Murcia and worked as a sports physician. He has also taught physiotherapy at the Universidad Católica San Antonio de Murcia.

During the November 2019 Spanish general election he was directly elected as a Senator for Vox representing the Murcia constituency. In the Senate, he focuses on matters related to the constitution.
