= Antonio Alarcó Hernandez =

Spanish politician

Antonio Alarco Hernandez
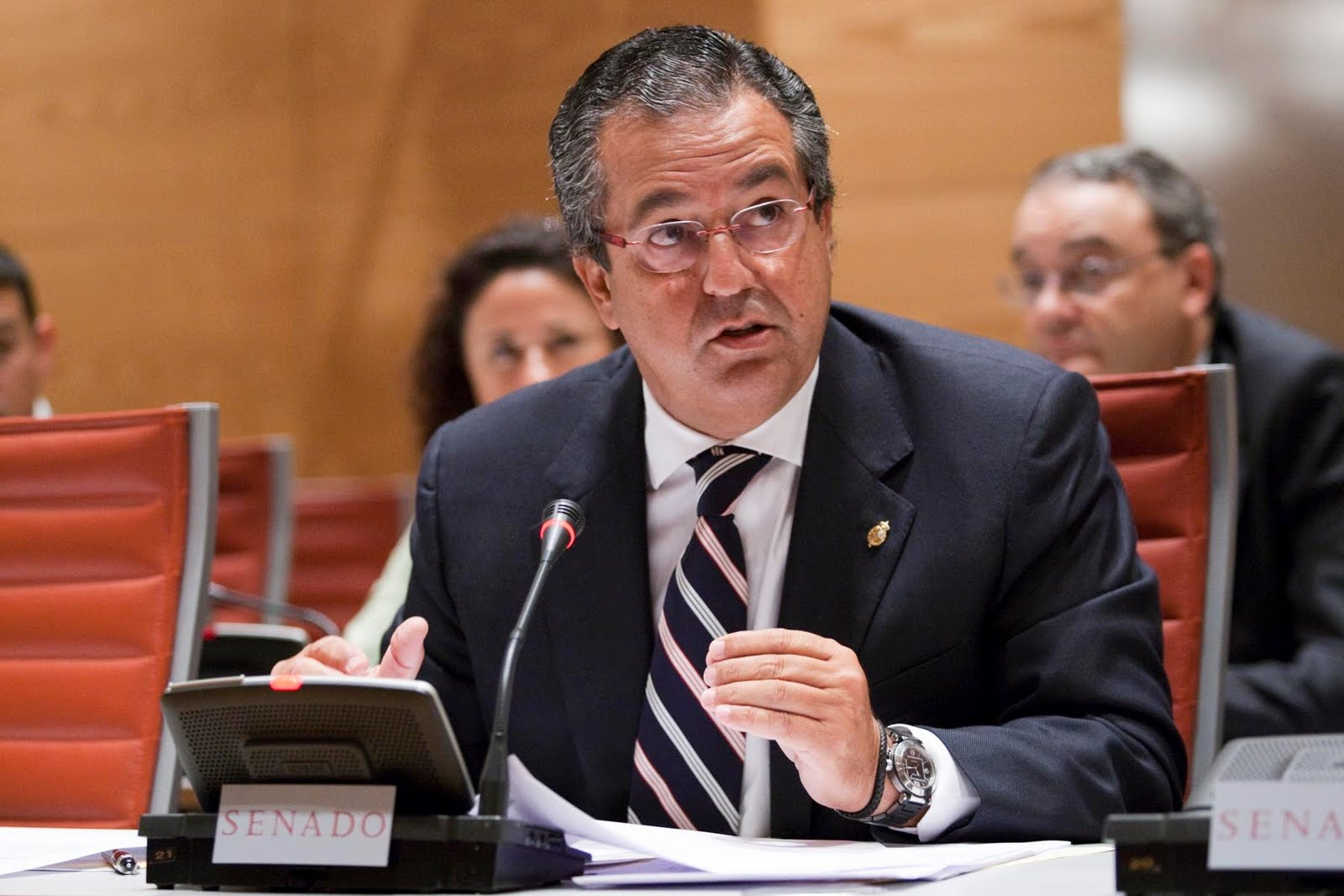

Senator in the 14th Cortes Generales
- Incumbent
- Assumed office Since 1 April 2008

Personal details
- Born: 31 August 1951 (age 75) Santa Cruz de Tenerife
- Education: University of La Laguna

Antonio Alarco Hernandez (born 31 August 1951 in Santa Cruz de Tenerife, Spain) is a Spanish politician, surgeon and professor. He was elected into the senate of Spain since 2008 representing Tenerife under the People's Party (Spain). He has served on the 9th, 10th, 11th, 12th, 13th and 14th Cortes Generales of Spain. He is a professor of surgery at the University of La Laguna and a physician.

== Biography ==
Hernandez was born and raised in Santa Cruz de Tenerife on 31 August 1951. He attended University of La Laguna where he studied Medicine and Surgery and graduated with a Bachelors. He also obtained a Doctorate degree in 1980 in the same field. Later, he became a doctor in Information Sciences and a doctor in Sociology.

In 1980, Hernandez was appointed professor of pathology and surgical clinic at the Faculty of Medicine of the University of La Laguna. Since 1996, he has also been the professor of surgery at the same university. He is the chief physician at Hospital Universitario de Canarias. He has authored numerous books, published in national and international magazines.

== Political career ==
Hernandez is a member of the People's Party (Spain) where he was elected senator since 2008. He is a member of the permanent council in the Spanish senate. He is a member of the Senate house committee on Health, Consumption and Social Welfare Commission. Since 2015, he has been the leader of the People's Party in the Municipality of San Cristóbal de La Laguna, where he is a councilor in the City Council.
