= Lagunilla del Jubera =

- Municipality
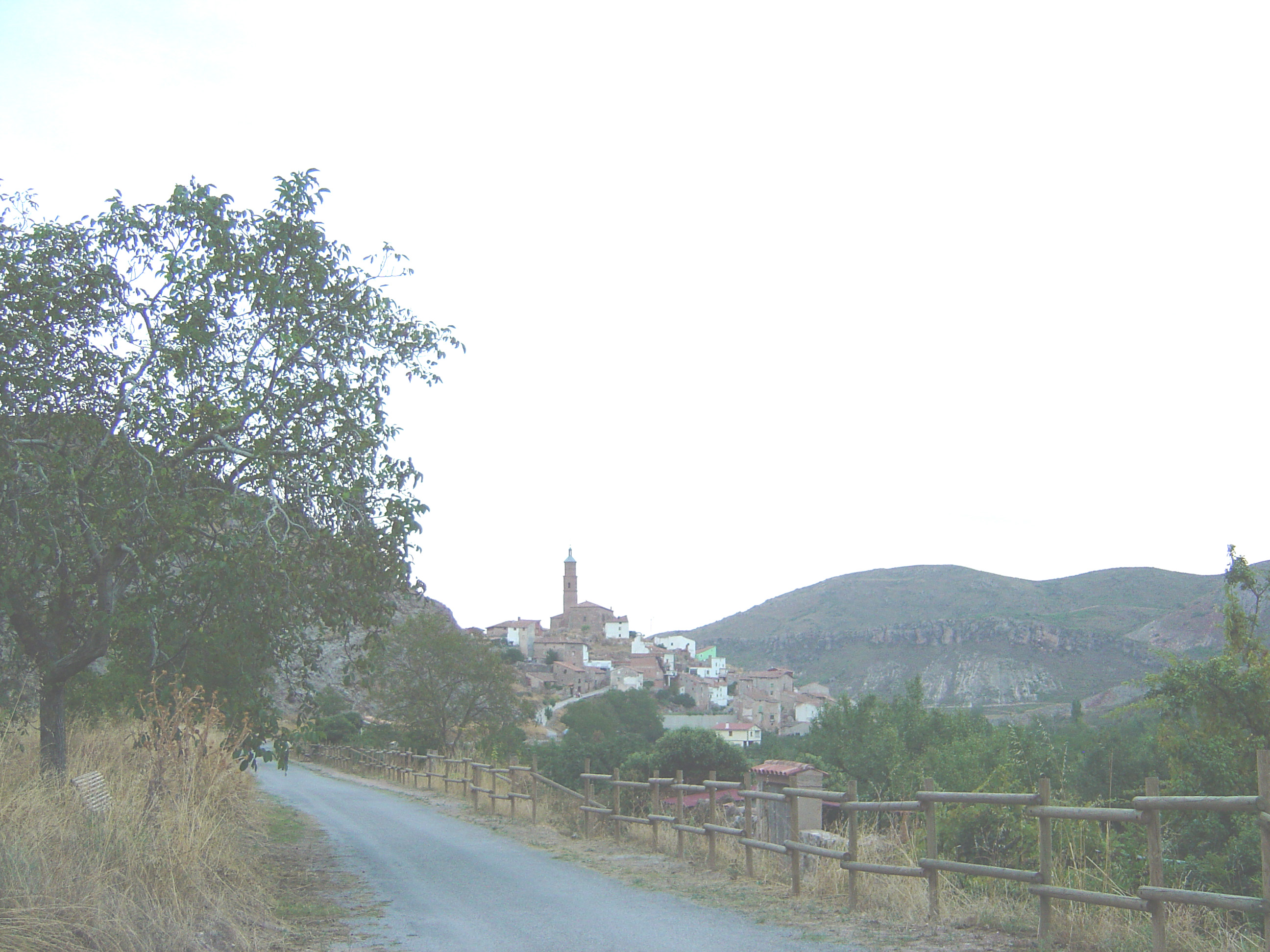

- Location within La Rioja, Spain Location within Spain
- Country: Spain
- Autonomous community: La Rioja
- Comarca: Logroño

Government
  - Mayor: Carlos Yécora (PP)

Area
  - Total: 34.3 km^{2} (13.2 sq mi)
- Elevation: 612 m (2,008 ft)

Population (2025-01-01)
  - Total: 385
  - Density: 11.2/km^{2} (29.1/sq mi)
- Time zone: UTC+1 (CET)
  - Summer (DST): UTC+2 (CET)
- Website: www.lagunilladeljubera.org

Lagunilla del Jubera is a municipality in the autonomous community of La Rioja, northern Spain, located in the Jubera River valley 19 kilometers (12 miles) from the capital, Logroño. Its population in the 2011 census was 325, and its area is 34.3 square kilometres (13.2 sq mi). The town has a Mediterranean climate, with hot dry summers and cold winters. Although agriculture has declined in the area, grains and grapes are still grown and livestock raised on a small scale.
