= Emilio Argüeso Torres =

Spanish politician

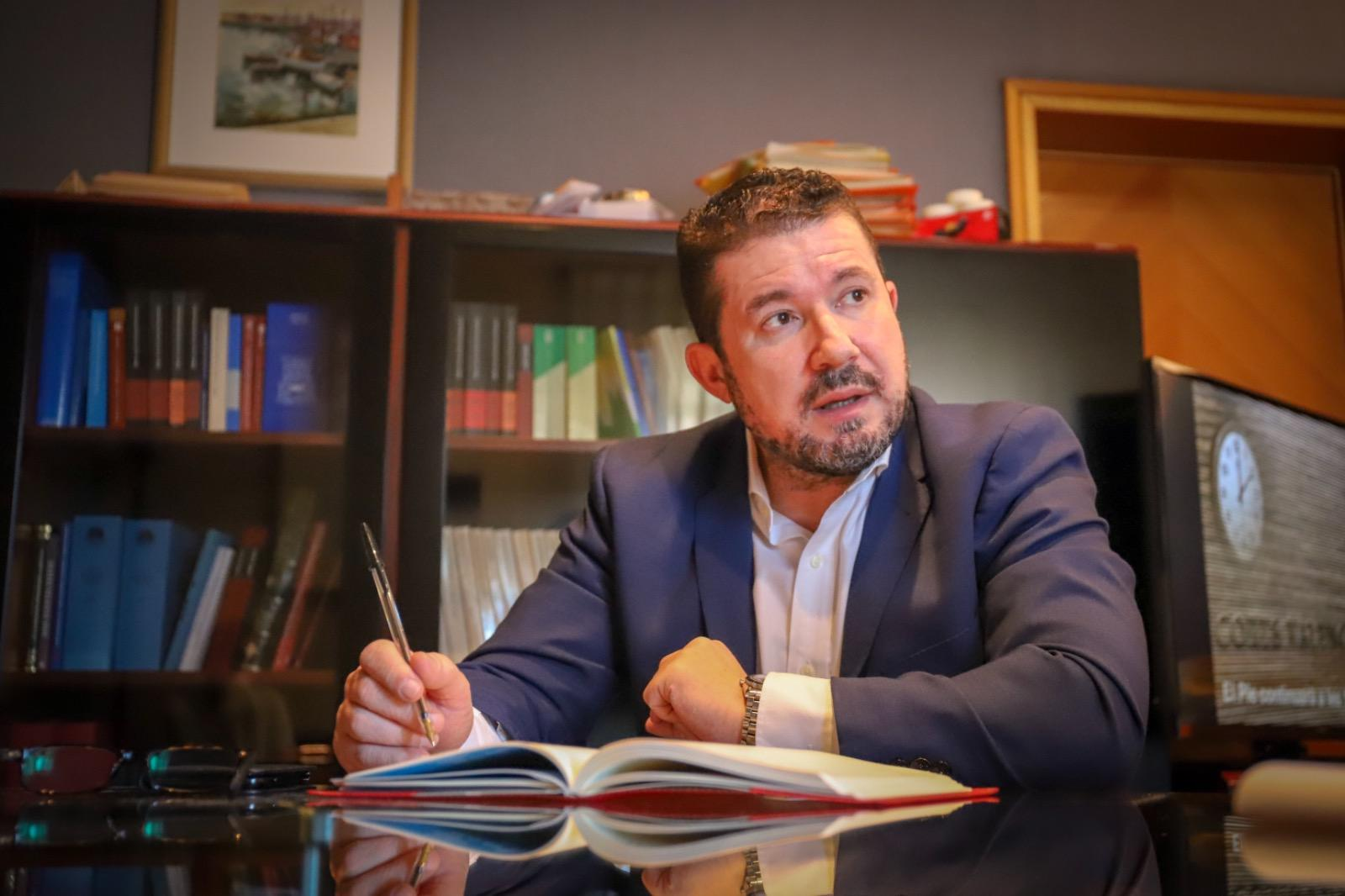

Senator in the Cortes Generales by appointment of the Cortes Valencianas
- Incumbent
- Assumed office 27 June 2019

Personal details
- Born: 20 February 1969 (age 57) Alicante, Spain

Emilio Argüeso Torres (born 20 February 1969 in Alicante, Spain) is a Spanish politician, lawyer and criminologist. He is a senator by appointment in the Senate of Spain representing the Valencian Parliament or Cortes Valencianas. He was appointed into the Senate of Spain by the Valencian Parliament on 27 June 2019.

== Biography ==
Torres was born in Alicante, on 20 February 1969. He obtained a degree in Law and Criminology from the University of Murcia and also has a master's degree in Forensic Sciences from University of Murcia. He began his political career in the late 1980s actively participating in local politics in Elche, but without holding any public office due to any political background. He joined the Civil Guard, but later he left to join the local Police of Spain, being sent to work in the Murcian municipalities of Archena and Totana; where he was Chief of Police and Director of the Security and Emergencies Area.

After the regional elections of 2015, he was elected as a Deputy in the Valencian Parliament, having presented himself as number 2 on the list of Citizens for the electoral district of Alicante. As a deputy in the Cortes Valencianas, he was the Vice President of the Parliamentary Commission for Coordination, Organization and Regime of the institutions of the Generalitat, First Secretary of the Commission of Regulations and of the Statutes of the deputies and deputies and is also a Member of the Commissions of Petitions, of Interior Government and of the Special Commission of Citizen Participation.

During the 9th legislature he was the First Secretary of the Corts Valencianas. He is currently the senator representing Valencia in the Senate of Spain since 27 June 2019, after being appointed by the Valencian Parliament.
