= Jacobo González-Robatto =

Spanish politician (born 1987)

Jacobo González-Robatto Perote
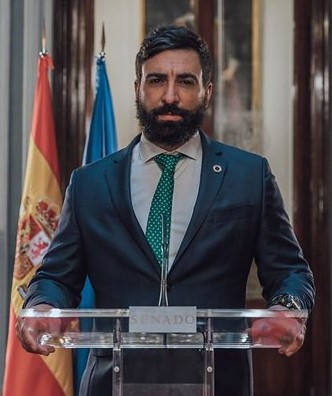

Spanish Senator designated by the Parliament of Andalusia
- Incumbent
- Assumed office 19 December 2019

Member of the Parliament of Andalusia
- Incumbent
- Assumed office 2 December 2018

Personal details
- Born: 14 October 1987 (age 38) Madrid, Spain
- Party: Vox
- Children: 2
- Education: CUNEF University

Jacobo González-Robatto Perote (born October 14, 1987) is a Spanish politician who is a member of the Parliament of Andalusia for the Vox party and since 2019 Vox's spokesman in the Spanish Senate.

== Biography ==
Robatto was born Madrid before moving to Seville. His father was president of the Pescanova company and an executive for the People's Party. Although born Jacobo, he is known as "Coco" by family and colleagues. He graduated with an MBA from CUNEF University and worked as a management consultant in the tourism sector. He has also been involved in humanitarian projects in Africa.

Robatto has two sons from a relationship with Spanish fashion designer Rocío Osorno.

== Political career ==
Robatto was introduced into Vox by its leader Santiago Abascal and he subsequently worked as a financial secretary for the party. In 2018, he was elected to the Parliament of Andalusia along with eleven other Vox deputies and in 2019 was appointed as a Senator by the party.

In politics, he has called for a move to "revive Hispanidad culturally" in Spain and Latin America.
