= Pablo Pérez Coronado =

Spanish politician, economist and professor

Member of the Spanish Parliament
- Incumbent
- Assumed office 26 June 2023

Senator in the Spanish Parliament
- In office 10 November 2019 – 30 May 2023

Segovia city councillor
- In office 27 March 2009 – 28 May 2023

Personal details
- Born: December 26, 1984 (age 41) Salamanca, Spain
- Party: People's Party
- Education: IES Andrés Laguna; University of Valladolid
- Occupation: Politician

Pablo Pérez Coronado (26 December 1984, Salamanca, Spain) is a Spanish politician, economist and professor of the People's Party, currently a member of the Spanish Parliament in the XV legislature, and has also been a senator in the XIV legislature as well as a councillor and mayoral candidate for the same party in the city of Segovia.

== Biography ==
Although he was born in Salamanca on 26 December 1984, he has always lived in Segovia. He graduated in Business Administration and Management from the University of Valladolid and also as an EFA-certified Asset Manager from the Spanish Institute of Financial Analysts. From 2007 to 2008 he worked at Bankinter as a private banking manager and then from 2008 to 2010 as an investment advisor. Since 2009 he has been a lecturer at the University of Valladolid and from 2010 to 2019 he has been appointed director of Renta 4 Banco.

In 2012 he was appointed director of the private entity Gestión y Calidad Turística Ciudad de Segovia, S.A.U., a commercial company created by Segovia City Council and chaired by its then mayor Pedro Arahuetes.

== Political career ==
At the age of 17 he joined the New Generations of the People's Party, which he would preside from 2006 to 2014. In the 2007 municipal elections he was a candidate for councillor in Segovia, but after not being elected, he had to wait until 27 March 2009, when, following the resignation of two councillors from his party, he took over the post. He was a councillor until the municipal elections of 2023, when he no longer stood.

In the municipal elections of 2019 he was a candidate for mayor, not without some controversy for having been imposed as mayor by party actors from outside Segovia, in these elections the mayor Clara Luquero managed to revalidate her position and Pablo Pérez was the leader of the opposition in the city council.

In the general elections of November 2019 he was elected senator and in the Spanish general elections of 2023 he headed the list of the People's Party for the Congress of Deputies, winning the position of deputy with two of the three seats to be distributed, in both elections he ran for the constituency of Segovia.
