= 2024–2026 Spanish sexual misconduct allegations =

Political scandal in Spain

A series of allegations emerged in Spain throughout 2024 to 2026, concerning the involvement of Spanish politicians and other prominent media figures in cases of gender-based violence and sexual harassment and assault.

Starting in October 2024 with allegations of sexual misconduct against the former Podemos political party founder and Sumar politician Íñigo Errejón, public focus shifted to multiple cases affecting various other parties, such as the ruling Spanish Socialist Workers' Party (most notably over the "Salazar affair" in July and December 2025, concerning allegations taking place in the prime minister's office), and the People's Party, which ruled in most of the country's autonomous communities at the time (with the "Móstoles affair" receiving broad coverage in February 2026). Alleged cases of sexual misconduct emerging during this period also involved politicians from the Vox and Together for Catalonia parties, the late Prime Minister Adolfo Suárez, or singer Julio Iglesias.

While most cases were independent and unconnected to each other, and some did not result in successful criminal proceedings nor in complaints being filed, the sudden emergence of allegations during this period drew comparisons to the sexual misconduct allegations that led up to the MeToo movement, triggering a cascade of resignations and dismissals while highlighting structural flaws in the internal management of political parties and other institutions, a lack of effective prevention mechanisms, non-compliance with internal anti-harassment protocols, and the persistence of a "culture of silence".

== First wave of allegations (October 2024) ==
=== Errejón affair ===
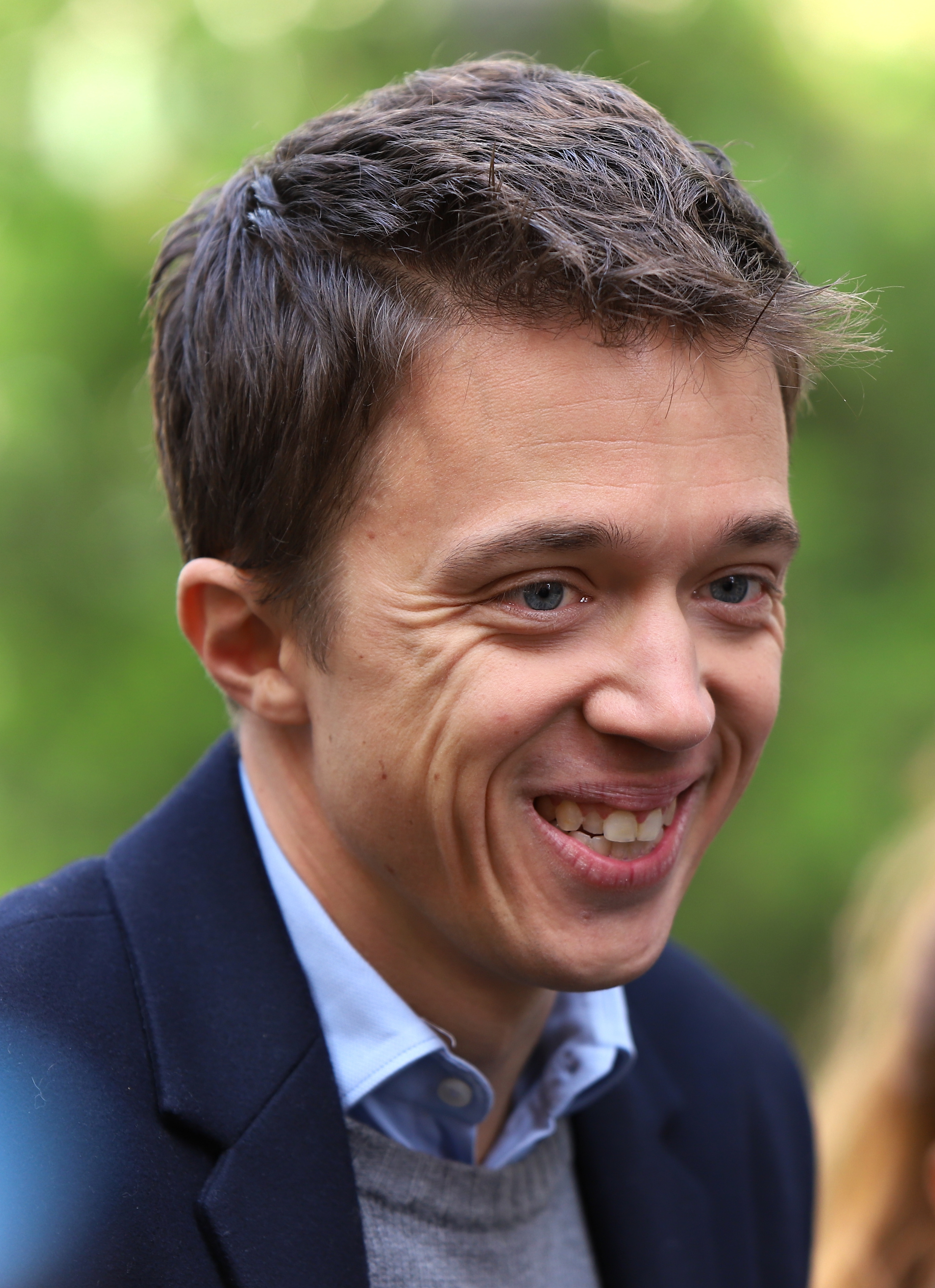
Sumar spokesperson in the Congress of Deputies, Íñigo Errejón, resigned from his posts in October 2024 amidst accusations of sexual harassment to several women.

On 24 October 2024, former Podemos founder and Sumar spokesperson in the Congress of Deputies, Íñigo Errejón, published a letter on X where he announced his abandonment of institutional politics, leaving his Congress seat and all his political responsibilities. This followed an anonymous accusation made two days earlier on journalist Cristina Fallarás's Instagram account, where an unnamed personality (later revealed to be him) was accused of sexually harassing several women.

The following day, on 25 October, actress Elisa Mouliaá filed a complaint against Errejón for sexual assault based on events that allegedly took place in September 2021. Based on the accusation, the press uncovered other alleged, anonymous accounts. On 29 October, public figure Aída Nízar claimed to have filed a harassment complaint against Errejón in 2015, though this was later archived due to the alleged crime having expired under the statute of limitations.

The Errejón affair unleashed a political crisis between political parties Sumar and Podemos, as suspicions of a cover-up during the middle of the electoral campaign for the 2023 general election about harassment in Castellón emerged. The leader of the Sumar alliance (also the second deputy prime minister and labour minister of Spain) Yolanda Díaz, apologised for their delay in acting against Errejón, claiming that she had personally ordered the late deputy to stand down as soon as he acknowledged "sexist and degrading attitudes to women". The affair also saw Más Madrid dismissing regional deputy Loreto Arenillas, the party's spokesperson for feminism and Errejón's former chief of staff, after accusing her of allegedly attempting to cover-up the scandal. The party's guarantees committee later ruled Arenillas's dismissal as unlawful, with the party acknowledging in March 2025 that it acted wrongly with Arenillas, who ultimately vacated her Assembly seat.

Judicial proceedings against Errejón over the Mouliaá's case continued throughout 2025 and became a recurring focus of media interest, owing to a number of revelations including the declaration by two witnesses that the actress pressured them to endorse her version of events against Errejón, a lawsuit from Errejón against Mouliaá for alleged slander after she accused him of extorting these witnesses, and the contradictory versions of both Errejón and Mouliaá during the investigation. On 14 November 2025, the investigating judge proposed bringing Errejón to trial, considering that there was "evidence" that he sexually assaulted Mouliaá; Errejón's defense appealed the decision on the grounds that the actress had allegedly committed perjury and accusing her of making money on television by telling the story of her lawsuit. The prosecutor's office in Madrid announced on 17 December 2025 that it would not charge Errejón for the alleged sexual assault and would request the closure of the case. On 4 February 2026, Mouliaá announced the withdrawal of her complaint against Errejón citing alleged "health reasons", though she retracted this decision on 10 February.

On 25 February 2026, it was revealed that a second actress had filed a complaint against Errejón for another alleged sexual assault. This second complaint was archived on 13 March because the alleged victim did not ratify it within the legal deadline, owing to her being "an actress of recognized public notoriety and projection" who wanted to remain anonymous.

=== Incidents in Andalusia ===
On 23 October 2024, a local police official in Estepona filed a complaint for an alleged crime of sexual harassment against the local People's Party (PP) mayor, José María García Urbano, who responded by framing it as a false accusation. The complaint was extended to cover an alleged crime of embezzlement after it transpired that Urbano had employed the police official's wife, allegedly a witness to the harassment. The investigation on the alleged harassment was initially closed on 27 January 2025 over exchanged messages between Urbano and the alleged victim revealing "full consent", but it was reopened in June 2025, this time over an alleged gender-based violence crime, as the victims claimed their consent was out of fear of possible reprisals from Urbano. Embezzlement charges on the mayor were maintained owing to suspicions that Urbano employeed the person without she ever showing up to work. Urbano reimbursed the city council for the salary paid to his "female friend" (5,200 euros) in November 2025, in what was described as an attempt to lessen any possible penalty for the alleged embezzlement. The investigating judge determined that the disputed hiring was "a mere legal fiction", prompting the prosecutor's office in Marbella to asked for a five-and-a-half-year prison sentence for Urbano in January 2026. Opposition parties in the city council demanded the mayor's resignation for these events, as well as the pending gender-related violence charges.

On 28 October 2024, mayor of Algeciras and PP senator José Ignacio Landaluce was also accused of sexual misconduct against two party's councilwomen, after the publication of several WhatsApp chat screenshots by far-right agitator Alvise Pérez. In December 2025, and amidst increased public scrutiny of sexual misconduct allegations in Spanish politics (a result of the Salazar affair), the Spanish Socialist Workers' Party (PSOE) would file a criminal complaint against Landaluce for embezzlement, influence-peddling and sexual assault; this would prompt Landaluce to temporarily step back from the PP and from the party's parliamentary group in the Senate, while maintaining his "absolute innocence". This specific complaint was archived by the prosecutor's office on 15 January 2026, owing to a lack of evidence to initiate an investigation. On 17 December 2025, new evidence emerged questioning Landaluce's handling of the case, including a fellow party member's alleged attempts to pressure one of the victims to feign a mental disorder and retract her statements. The revelations caused discomfort among the PP's ranks, who hoped for Landaluce to voluntarily step aside from the Algeciras mayorship and "avoid further problems for the party". The PP's spokesperson in the Senate, Alicia García, commented on Landaluce's situation that, owing to his resignation both from the party's membership and parliamentary group, she and her party had "nothing further to add on this matter". On 19 December, Landaluce filed a complaint against Alvise Pérez after the latter threatened him on social media with releasing further information about sexual harassment and abuse of power if he did not resign.

On 2 December 2024, the former Vox spokesperson in Huércal de Almería, Arturo Ramón Torres Escamilla, was tried for two alleged counts of sexual assault against a minor—one of them continuous—for events that occurred between 2019 and 2021. On 9 January 2025, the media reported that Torres Escamilla had been found guilty on both counts, sentenced to nine years in prison and ordered to pay 25,000 euros in compensation to the victim.

== Allegations trickle in (early-to-mid 2025) ==
On 31 January 2025, it was revealed that a former political advisor to Together for Catalonia (Junts) had filed a formal complaint to the European Parliament against Toni Comín, elected MEP, for alleged sexual and psychological harassment taking place until the chamber's 2024 election. Comín branded the accusations as unfounded and aimed at damaging him politically, while Junts opened an internal investigation on the issue. On 17 March 2026, the Parliament found the presented evidence as "credible" and "sufficient" for a judicial investigation, while offering to cover the victim's costs of taking the case to court. The next day, it emerged that the Junts party had suspended the internal investigation on Comín in February (despite being aware of the Parliament's resolution upholding the victim's complaint), as well as providing the MEP with the victim's written statements and other confidential information.

On 4 June 2025, the Sea minister of the Galician government, Alfonso Villares, resigned from his post over a judicial investigation for alleged sexual assault following a complaint—filed several months earlier—from television presenter Paloma Lago. In his farewell, Villares asserted his innocence, but claimed that his resignation came over a desire to focus his efforts on defending himself, as well as to renounce the legal immunity granted by his cabinet post. On 22 December, the investigating court archived the case and sent it to the provincial court of A Coruña to issue a final decision.

Francisco "Paco" Salazar, an aide to the prime minister of Spain and a prominent PSOE member (which was about to take on the party's organization secretary role following the resignation of its former holder—Santos Cerdán—over the Koldo case), resigned from his posts on 5 July 2025 after allegations of sexual harassment by a number of former women subordinates, which caused significant outrage and public backlash at a time when the Spanish government was being hit by a number of scandals. The then government's spokesperson (also a PSOE member), Pilar Alegría, claimed that her party "totally" rejected "sexist behaviours", while announcing that the PSOE would "vigorously" take measures against them.

== Second wave of allegations (December 2025) ==
=== Salazar affair and "PSOE's MeToo" ===
In December 2025, it emerged that the allegations against Paco Salazar had been made months before his July firing and that the PSOE had mishandled its internal investigation into the allegations, together with new testimonies about Salazar's alleged inappropriate conduct. Government spokesperson Pilar Alegría labeled Salazar's alleged comments to some of his subordinate employees as "disgusting". The government's regional delegate in Asturias and former PSOE deputy secretary-general, Adriana Lastra, urged the party to "fulfil its commitment to women’s independence, safety and freedom" as well as to hand over details of the allegations against Salazar to prosecutors. On 7 December, three incumbent female legislators of the party (Andrea Fernández, Carmela Silva and Araceli Martínez) called in an opinion piece in the El País newspaper for "profound transformations that guarantee, full, real and effective equality".

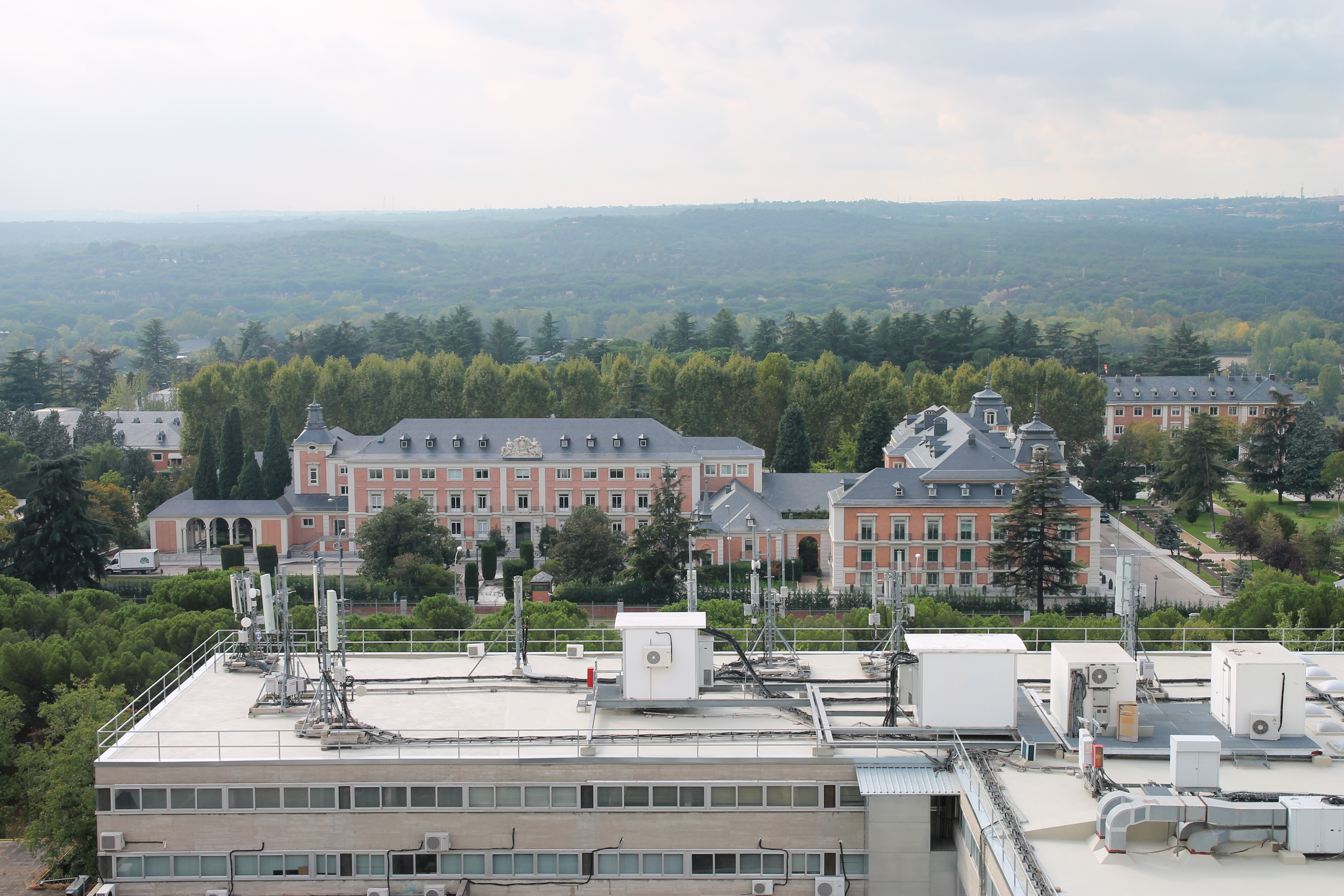
The "Salazar affair" in 2025 saw the resignation or dismissal of two PSOE members in the office of the Prime Minister of Spain and triggered a cascade of allegations within the party, which was compared to the MeToo movement.

Subsequent revelations led to the dismissal of another official in the prime minister's office, Antonio Hernández, who was accused by victims as having been "accomplice" to Salazar's alleged misconduct, though Hernández denied any wrongdoing. The PSOE admitted a "lack of diligence" in handling the complaints against Salazar, which went unaddressed for five months due to a purported computer error, while the PSOE's organization secretary, Rebeca Torró, formally apologized to women within the party for "communication failures" regarding internal reports of sexual harassment. Prime minister and PSOE leader, Pedro Sánchez, assumed "personal responsibility" for the errors and announced his party's support to Salazar's alleged victims if they filed criminal complaints against him, but rejected accusations on his government's alleged lack of commitment to feminism over the affair and boasted of the legislation approved under his tenure to ensure gender balance in key sectors, promote gender equality and fight gender-related violence.

Aitor Hernández-Morales of Politico, Rocío Gil Grande of RTVE and Isabelle Piquer of Le Monde compared public frustration over the events to a version of the MeToo movement within the Socialists' ranks, including the emergence of further cases of alleged sexual misconduct seeing numerous resignations, such as the party leader in Torremolinos (Antonio Navarro), the party's national secretary of studies and programs (Javier Izquierdo, also a senator), the mayor of Belalcázar (Francisco Luis Fernández Rodríguez), the party's deputy secretary in the province of Valencia and mayor of Almussafes (Toni González), and the mayor of Monforte de Lemos and president of the provincial deputation of Lugo (José Tomé). According to Inés Fernández-Pontes of Euractiv, the scandal triggered "a political storm reaching deep into Prime Minister Pedro Sánchez's inner circle", observing that it risked affecting PSOE's support among women, which was one of their major bases of support among the Spanish population. The cases were seen as particularly damaging for the PSOE's public standing as the party championed the defense of feminism and the fight against gender-based violence. Judicial proceedings against Salazar were closed on 15 January 2026, owing to a lack of evidence and the lack of complaint from the alleged victims. On 28 January, the PSOE announced a review of its anti-harassment protocols in response to the internal crisis triggered by the allegations, as well as requiring its officials and workers to take mandatory training courses on equality and harassment prevention. On 5 February, during a parliamentary hearing in the Spanish Senate related to the Koldo case, Salazar rejected all harassment allegations and claimed that his decision to resign in July 2025 was taken "for family reasons" and not because he acknowledged any guilt.

The Tomé affair in particular became notable after the regional PSOE leader in Galicia, José Ramón Gómez Besteiro, admitted on 12 December 2025 to having prior knowledge of allegations against the Lugo deputation president through a "third person". Besteiro's revelation prompted the resignation of the party's regional equality lead, Silvia Fraga, out of "disagreements" with the party leadership. Tomé's PSOE membership was suspended by the party on 10 December, and he resigned as provincial president on 30 December while claiming to be the victim of a false accusation, but he remained as local mayor of the Monforte de Lemos municipality as an independent amid protests from feminist groups. Victims of José Tomé's alleged sexual harassment denounced the events to the prosecutor's office in January 2026, On 28 January, a magazine show in the Cuatro TV channel, Código 10, claimed to have accessed a total of eight internal complaints against Tomé. with an investigation being opened in March for alleged crimes of sexual harassment and abuse of power. Some of the complainants in the case accused the PSOE of inaction and of trying to cover up the case by ignoring them and offering, but not providing, legal and psychological help.

On 1 January 2026, a local councilwoman in Logrosán filed a complaint through the PSOE's internal channels against José Luis Quintana, the president of the interim committee running the party in Extremadura and the government's regional delegate, for alleged workplace harassment. Both Quintana and the regional party denied the accusations, claiming that the councilwoman was "never employed" by him, and announced legal actions for alleged defamation and in defense of the former's honor.

Other cases of the "PSOE's MeToo" had different developments and coverage. On 16 February, the prosecutor's office in Málaga filed a complaint against Navarro, the former PSOE's leader in Torremolinos, for alleged sexual harassment and violations of sexual freedom and privacy. On 26 February, the mayor of Almussafes, Toni González, threatened a lawsuit against regional party leader Diana Morant for calling him a "whoremonger", while providing the PSOE with notarized documents with which he intended to prove that the alleged victim behaved with consent towards him. The PSOE expelled González as a member on 6 March 2026, arguing that his public statements against his alleged victims were in violation of the party's values.

=== Scandal spills over to other parties ===
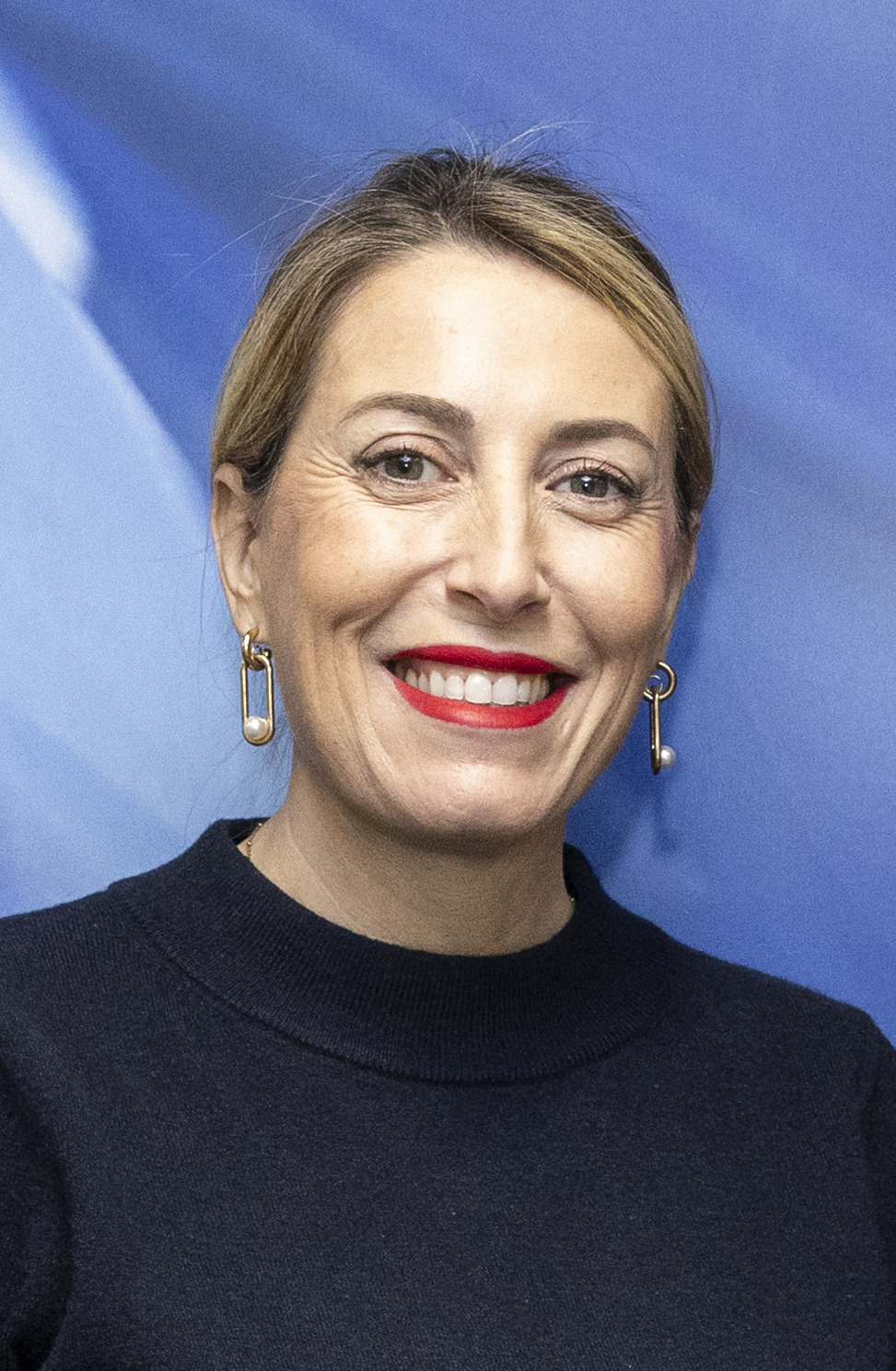
Misconduct allegations affected María Guardiola's 2025 regional election campaign.

On 10 December 2025, it was revealed that a former municipal employee in Xàbia had reported an alleged case of sexual harassment involving the local Vox spokesperson and second deputy mayor, José Marcos Pons. While Marcos asserted his innocence and rejected any wrongdoing, the local PP mayor dismissed him from his post following mounting pressure from the opposition in the city council, though it later transpired that she had been aware of the case since July. The mayor justified her delay by claiming that the alleged victim had asked her not to make it public. On 9 February 2026, the victim formally filed a criminal complaint against Marcos, with the judicial police gathering testimonies regarding the alleged sexual harassment in the ensuing days.

On 17 December 2025, Vox's social media manager, Javier Esteban, resigned from his post after a complaint was filed against him for an alleged sexual assault on a 16-year old, who also reported knowing two other cases of minors in a similar situation. The ABC newspaper also revealed that Esteban had used the party's official social media accounts to flirt with minors. The accused rejected any wrongdoing and claimed that the complaint against him was in retaliation for having reported that "hundreds of thousands of euros" collected for the victims of the 2024 Valencian floods by Revuelta (a youth organization with ties to Vox) never reached their intended recipients. Vox leader Santiago Abascal called the complaint against Esteban a "fabrication" and accused PP and PSOE of a "dirty campaign" against his party. In April 2026, Esteban was indicted for an alleged crime of sexual assault over these events.

In the middle of the December 2025 electoral campaign of the 2025 Extremaduran regional election, revelations emerged that the official driver of regional premier María Guardiola—also her cousin—had a conviction for minor coercion of his ex-partner and was included in the system for monitoring of gender-based violence victims and aggressors. The regional government of Extremadura subsequently fired the driver while Guardiola denied having any prior knowledge of this situation. Also in this context, and on the same date, a PP councilwoman in Navalmoral de la Mata denounced sexist behavior and treatment from the party's local mayor, Enrique Hueso; that she had (unsuccessfully) requested protection from her party; and that their response—recorded in an audio from the PP's regional spokesperson, José Ángel Sánchez Juliá—was to "hang on, you know how he is" while her complaint was concealed. Both the mayor and regional president Guardiola rejected the events and framed the councilwoman's accusations as political spite for not having been included on the electoral lists. On 23 December, after the regional election, the Navalmoral councilwoman clarified that she had never accused the mayor of any crime and that she regretted the "interpretations".

On 18 December 2025, elDiario.es revealed that the PP mayor of Jérica and advisor in the provincial deputation of Castellón, Jorge Peiró, was under investigation by the High Court of Justice of the Valencian Community for the alleged sexual assault of two minors, with a local court in Segorbe having issued a restraining order against him a few months prior. Peiró denied any wrongdoing while the PP suspended his party membership and dismissed him from his advisor post. Peiró claimed that the local and provincial parties had previous knowledge of the judicial investigation, but that they had only acted against him when it was made public.

=== Adolfo Suárez ===
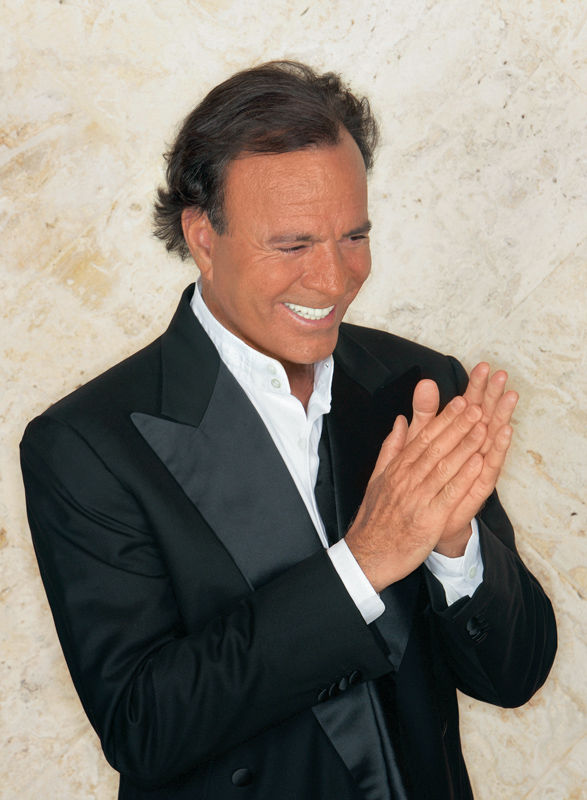
Accusations of sexual harassment against singer Julio Iglesias in January 2026 were the subject of media and political interest.

On 9 December 2025, a woman filed a complaint for sexual assault (which would have allegedly took place in the 1980s) against former prime minister Adolfo Suárez, deceased in 2014, beginning when she was 17 and he was 50. Suárez's secretary reportedly disputed the accusations made against her former employer. After the complaint was made public, the parties in the Spanish government, PSOE and Sumar, both expressed their solidarity with the victim of the alleged assault, whereas Podemos demanded the removal of tributes to Suárez's figure. Several media critical of Sánchez's government, such as El Mundo and El Español, published opinion pieces framing the complaint as an attempt to cover up news about the "corruption and sexual abuse scandals" affecting the PSOE at the time.

Criminal proceedings were archived on 20 February 2026, owing to the events being beyond the statute of limitations and the impossibility to claim any criminal liability because of Suárez's death.

=== Julio Iglesias ===
On 13 January 2026, singer Julio Iglesias was accused by two former employees of alleged sexual assault. The Minister of Equality of Spain, Ana Redondo, called for a thorough investigation into the sexual assault allegations against Iglesias. Madrilenian president and regional PP leader, Isabel Díaz Ayuso, immediately defended Iglesias as being the victim of a "lynching against a person who is not a politician", whereas PP national leader Alberto Núñez Feijóo deviated from this stance and called for the judicial investigation to be respected. Iglesias denied the allegations, saying that he had "never abused, coerced or disrespected any woman", adding that they were "false and painful".

The charges against Iglesias were dropped by Spanish prosecutors on 23 January 2026, after they concluded that the National Court of Spain did not have jurisdiction to investigate the events, which allegedly occurred at his residences in the Dominican Republic and the Bahamas. On 24 February, Iglesias announced complaints against the second deputy prime minister and labour minister of Spain, Yolanda Díaz, for libel and slander over comments accusing him of "sexual abuse" and establishing "a regime of slavery with a power structure based on permanent aggression”; and against the media outlets that published the informations against him, Univision and elDiario.es. On 25 February, elDiario.es reported on one of the women who accused Iglesias of sexual assault claiming to being followed by a Spanish private detective.

== Third wave of allegations (February 2026) ==
=== Móstoles affair ===
On 4 February 2026, it was revealed that the ruling PP in the Community of Madrid had attempted to cover-up an alleged sexual and workplace harassment case involving the mayor of the city of Móstoles, Manuel Bautista, against a local party councilwoman, who had been forced to resign from her position and leave the party after the internal proceedings were dismissed.

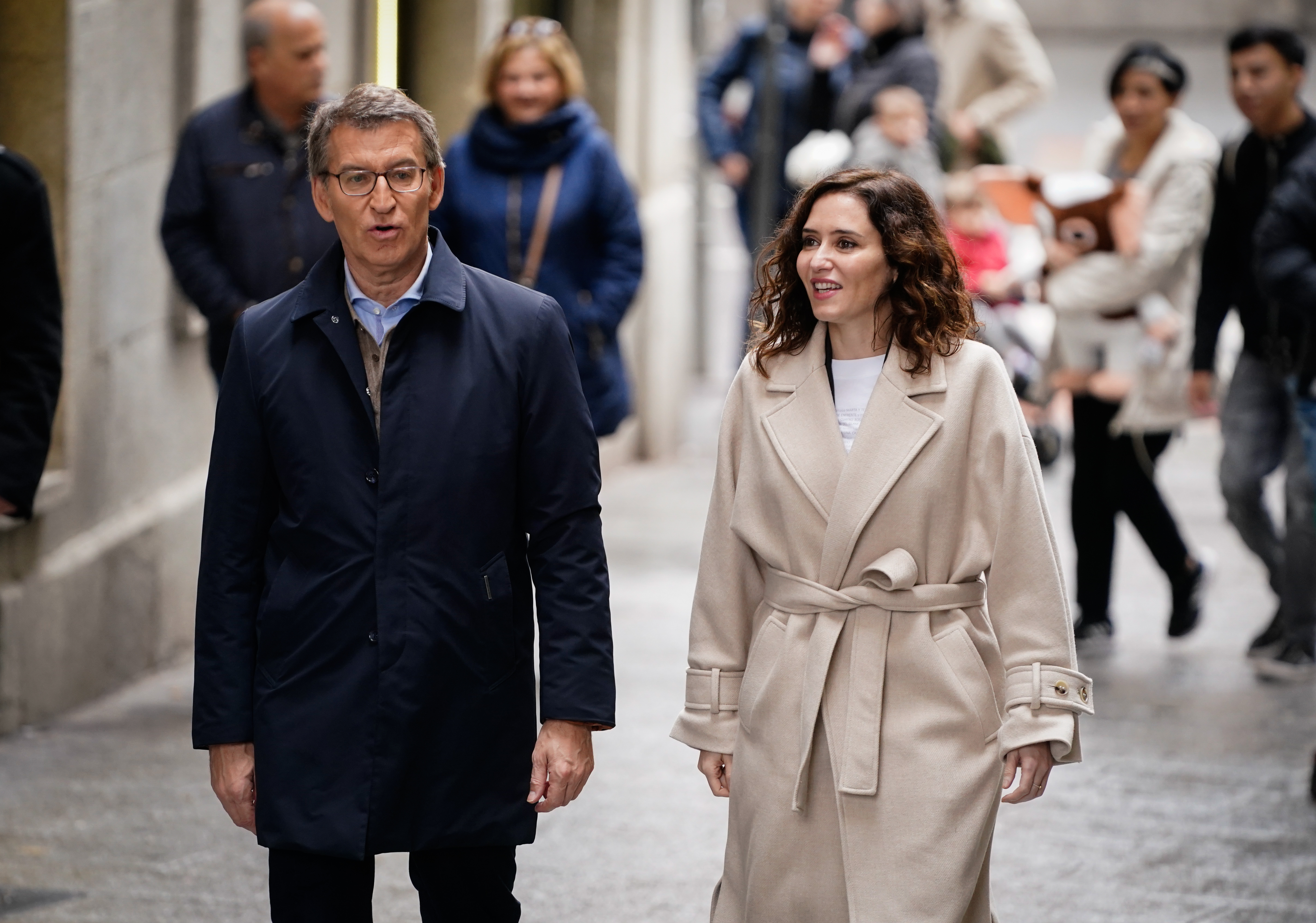
Amid accusations in February 2026 of covering-up an alleged sexual harassment scandal involving the mayor of Móstoles, national and regional PP leaders, Alberto Núñez Feijóo and Isabel Díaz Ayuso, described the affair as "fabricated".

The councilwoman had allegedly asked the party for support throughout 2024, including through a letter sent directly to the regional party leader and Madrilenian president, Isabel Díaz Ayuso, but this was met with attempts from the top two regional party officials after Ayuso, Alfonso Serrano (secretary-general) and Ana Millán (deputy secretary for organization), to minimize the incident and thwart any legal complaint; as well as with an alleged intensification of the harassment by the mayor after he learned that the councilwoman had filed an internal complaint. While Ayuso herself and the national opposition leader, Alberto Núñez Feijóo, denied any wrongdoing and claimed it was "a fabricated case", the victim announced legal actions against both the accused mayor (for sexual harassment and other offences) and against the regional government of Madrid (for the leaking of personal emails and private data without her consent, in what was dubbed by several media as an unsuccessful attempt to rebuke her), which materialized in a complaint being filed on 17 February. The regional PP branch, in turn, threatened to file a complaint against the former councilwoman for "fabricating evidence". The PP initially announced on 20 February that it would publish the full internal file on the harassment case, but then backtracked by claiming that it "contained confidential information".

The media featured a series of stories on how the scandal affected the former councilwoman's political circle: on 16 February, one of her former advisors resigned from her post as digitization coordinator in the city council, citing "consistency with the allegations that have been made public" and "in accordance with a duty of commitment to truthfulness"; on 24 February, Ayuso removed those close to the former councilwoman from the leadership of her party's parliamentary group in the Assembly of Madrid, including the group's deputy spokesperson, Elisa Vigil; then on 2 March, a Móstoles councillor who had supported the victim, Raúl Gallego (also Vigil's partner), resigned from his post over internal pressure he claimed to have suffered from his party for giving credence to the accusations against the mayor. Bautista insisted on his innocence and announced legal action to defend his honor during a city council plenary held on 24 February 2026, but opposition parties in the region demanded his resignation, with the case sparking a political crisis within the Community of Madrid as the regional PP became entangled in its own contradictions regarding the handling of the harassment complaint. On 26 February, Vox supported the PP in blocking an inquiry committee in the city council to investigate the harassment allegations against the mayor. In this context, the PP tried to frame another possible case of sexual harassment in the Móstoles city council, opened in 2024 against a state official, as inaction on the part of the Ministry for Digital Transformation and the Civil Service under one of Ayuso's political rivals at the time, Óscar López. López's ministry replied by claiming that the case had been left unresolved because of Ayuso's regional government ignoring their requests to provide further information.

The Móstoles affair has been described by the media, and used by political rivals, as evidencing the PP's alleged double standards in handling cases of sexual harassment within its ranks compared to how it deals with those that occur in other parties, while drawing comparisons to the Nevenka affair in the 2000s. The affair was also commented as leading to Alfonso Serrano (one of Ayuso's most trusted lieutenants) to fall out of favor with the Madrilenian president, after inadvertently allowing himself to be recorded pressuring the councilwoman to retract her harassment complaints, as well as attempting to justify Bautista's alleged behaviour with an unfortunate "how do you flirt?" statement to reporters.

In July 2026, Bautista was formally charged for sexual and workplace harassment in the ongoing judicial probe.

=== DAO affair ===
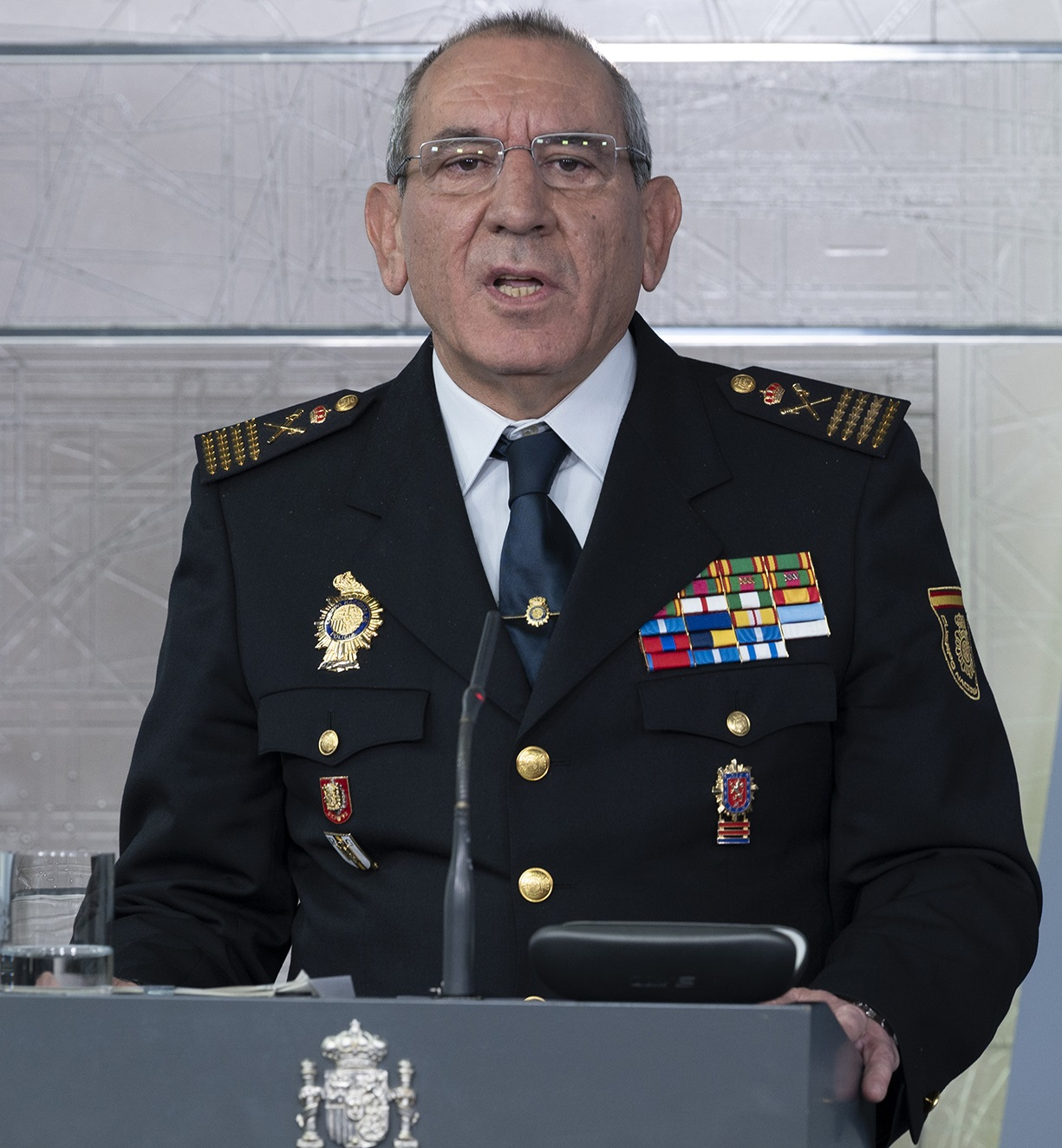
Deputy operational director (DAO) of the National Police Corps, José Ángel González, resigned in February 2026 over accusations of alleged rape.

On 17 February 2026, the deputy operational director (abbreviated as DAO) of the National Police Corps, José Ángel González, was accused of an alleged rape in April 2025 by a junior police inspector, triggering a political crisis which prompted González's resignation the next day. Concurrently, one of González's advisors, Óscar San Juan, was removed from his position after being accused of participating in an intimidation campaign against the victim to prevent her from reporting the incident. Subsequently, the victim's name and personal data were leaked in WhatsApp groups for police officers.

Pedro Sánchez's government replied by affirming that they had not been aware of the complaint until it was published in the media, and that it had acted "with empathy, coherently, and firmly", but offered to hand over the resignation of the Interior minister, Fernando Grande-Marlaska, if the victim believed he had "failed her". Marlaska had also came under fire for alleged "preferential treatment" to González (reported to still being allowed to use his official car and residence) and San Juan (who had been reassigned as head of the Scientific Police brigade). On 25 February, Marlaska announced an "extraordinary" review of the National Police's anti-harassment protocols after admitting they had failed in the former DAO's case.

The week after his resignation, a National Police commissioner filed a complaint against González for alleged "abuse of authority, coercion and a crime against moral integrity", while a second woman threatened to file another lawsuit after accusing González of "intimidating her" and "forcing her to lose her job" as a police officer. The DAO affair brought public focus on the use of authority within hierarchical structures such as those existing in police forces, with a similar workplace and sexual harassment case involving a former commissioner at the Spanish embassy in India, Emilio de la Calle—already under judicial investigation by the National Court, and with previous complaints to the Interior ministry regarding alleged abusive actions—being unveiled by El País on 27 February 2026.

=== Other 2026 cases ===
On 13 February 2026, the mayor of La Algaba, Diego Manuel Agüera, was accused of alleged sexual abuse of a minor, leading the party to open an investigation one month after learning of the case through its internal channels. The prosecutor's office subsequently ordered the opening of criminal proceedings after a formal complaint was filed against Agüera, leading to him voluntarily resigning from all of his posts and requesting the party to suspend his membership "so that the party does not get involved in an issue that has nothing to do" with it, while asserting his innocence.

Criminal proceedings were opened on 17 February against the chief of the municipal police of Alcalá de Henares, Luis Antonio Moreno, after two women filed complaints against him for alleged crimes of gender-related violence, injuries and domestic abuse. While these accusations joined others taking place in the summer of 2025—when Moreno had been accused of alleged workplace and sexual harassment, mistreatment, slander and libel offences that occurred during his time as commissioner in Torrejón de Ardoz—Alcalá's mayor Judith Piquet rejected taking any action against Moreno until there was "a final court ruling", and owing to previous events occurring "within a different administration". On 25 February, Moreno resigned from his post owing to "strictly personal reasons", while Piquet distanced herself from the decision.

On 26 February, the Ministry of Science, Innovation and Universities took note of an internal complaint for alleged sexual harassment filed in November 2025 against the managing director of the Spanish National Cancer Research Centre, José Manuel Bernabé, forcing his dismissal the next day. Bernabé claimed that the complaint was a consequence of him denouncing "dozens of corrupt practices" by his predecessor in the post, which included the employment contract of the alleged victim.

On 27 February, the local PSOE in Gijón suspended the membership of a former councillor, Iván Álvarez, after a complaint from a member regarding an alleged case of sexual harassment was received through the party's internal channels. Sources close to Álvarez commented that he had no contact with the alleged victim for over 15 months and that he had "a clear conscience and trust in that everything will be clarified".

El País reported on 27 March that two Vox employees in Barcelona were fired after reporting on alleged sexual harassment by Miguel Martínez, a district councilor for the party.

October 2026 saw two new sexual misconduct complaints against Algeciras mayor José Ignacio Landaluce, one of which over an incident that had allegedly taken place in July that same year. As a result, the local PP demanded Landaluce's resignation as mayor for the first time.

== Impact ==
The emergence of sexual misconduct allegations from 2024 to 2026, affecting Spanish politicians and other prominent public figures, drew comparisons to the Nevenka affair in the 2000s, while highlighting structural flaws in the internal management of political parties and other institutions, as well as lack of effective prevention mechanisms, non-compliance with internal anti-harassment protocols, and the persistence of a "culture of silence". For the PSOE, the allegations damaged its public standing as a champion in the defense of feminism and the fight against gender-based violence at a time when the Spanish government of Pedro Sánchez was beleaguered with judicial investigations on corruption scandals. As a result, it risked affecting PSOE's support among women (which was one of their major bases of support among the Spanish population) as well as the continued support of its parliamentary allies, which warned against the continued string of scandals.

Other cases brought public focus on the misuse of authority within hierarchical structures, where high-ranking officials allegedly exploited their authority to silence subordinates, and the extent to which rape culture remained present in society. In March 2026, El País reported that, since 2018, only 516 internal complaints for sexual harassment had been filed in the General State Administration (out of a workforce of 540,000), of which only 115 cases had been estimated; this complaint rate was described as a structural problem that highlighted "internal hierarchy and distrust in protocols, fear of reprisals and stigmatization" as possible reasons.

== See also ==
- Catholic Church sexual abuse cases in Europe
- Disputes involving the Spain women's national football team
- Grok sexual deepfake scandal
- La Manada rape case
- La Manada sex abuse case of Pozoblanco
- Rubiales case
