= Andrea Fernández (politician) =

Spanish politician (born 1992)

Excellency Sir/Madam Andrea Fernández
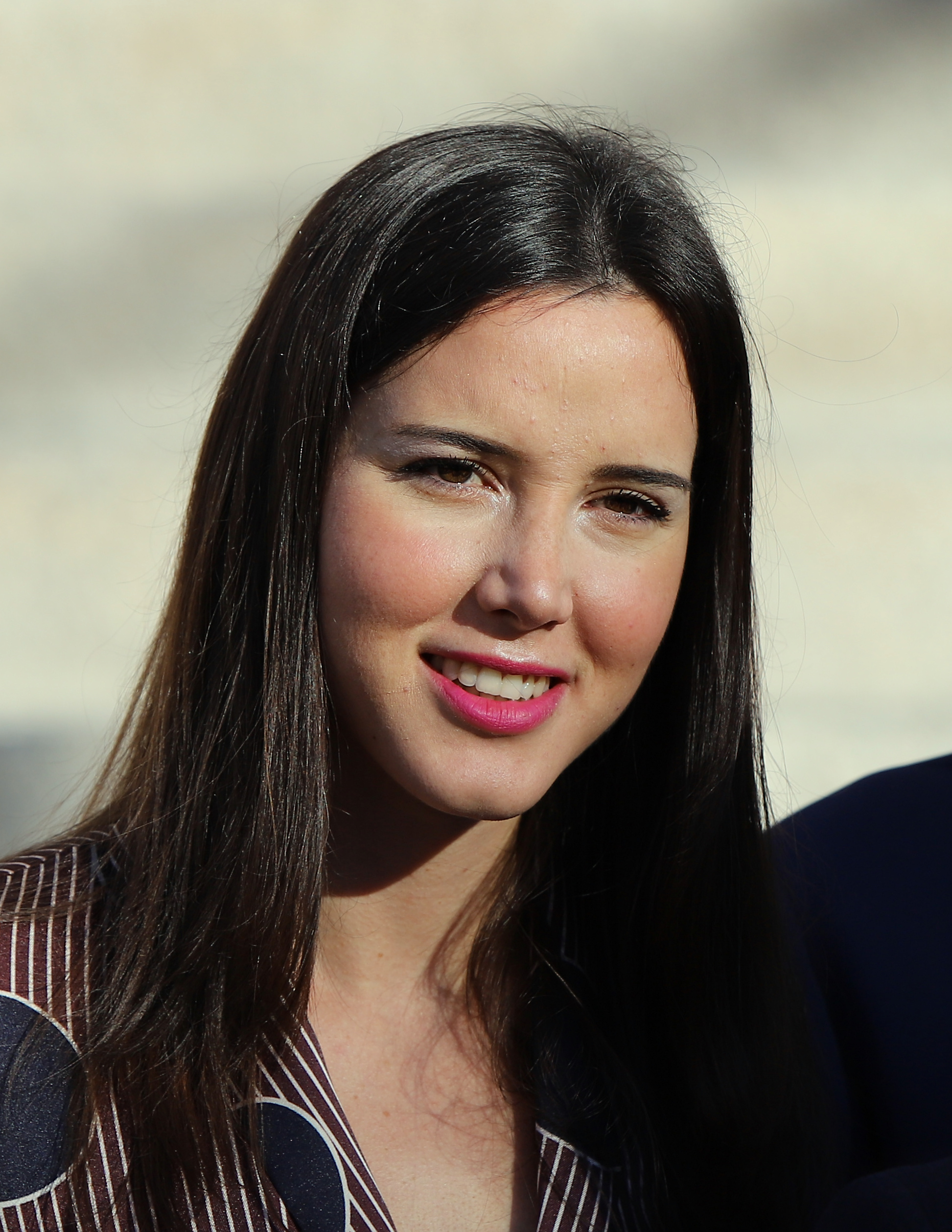

Member of the Congress of Deputies
- Incumbent
- Assumed office 2018

Secretary of Equality of the Spanish Socialist Workers' Party (PSOE)
- Incumbent
- Assumed office 2021

Personal details
- Born: Andrea Fernández Benéitez; 20 October 1992 (age 33) Valencia de Don Juan, Spain
- Party: Spanish Socialist Workers' Party
- Education: University of León (LL.B., LL.M.); National University of Distance Education (BA)
- Profession: lawyer, politician

Andrea Fernández Benéitez (born 20 October 1992) is a Spanish lawyer and politician. She is a member of the Congress of Deputies and the Secretary of Equality of the Spanish Socialist Workers' Party (PSOE).

== Early life ==
She earned a bachelor's degree in law at the University of León. Later, she earned a master's degree in legal practice, also at the University of León. After passing the Spanish Bar Examination, she obtained the title of lawyer (license) and joined the Bar Association of León (ICAL) in 2017.

She worked as a corporate lawyer at Grupo Empresarial AST, in León.

== Political career ==
In 2014, she joined the socialist group of Valencia de Don Juan and was part of the candidacy for the municipal elections of 2015. Since 2017, she has been Secretary of Equality of the Provincial Executive of the PSOE of León.

In 2019, she was ranked number two in the PSOE list for the province of León to the Congress of Deputies, and after the general elections of 28 April, she obtained a seat as a member of the Congress of Deputies. In the general elections of November 2019, she again occupied the second place in the electoral lists of the PSOE for the province of León, revalidating her deputy certificate.

On 17 October 2021, she joined the Federal Executive Commission of the PSOE as Secretary of Equality.

== Positions held ==
- Secretary of Equality of the Provincial Executive of the PSOE of León
- Member of the Congress of Deputies (2019-)
- Secretary of Equality of the PSOE (2021-)
