= Justo Garrán Moso =

Spanish politician

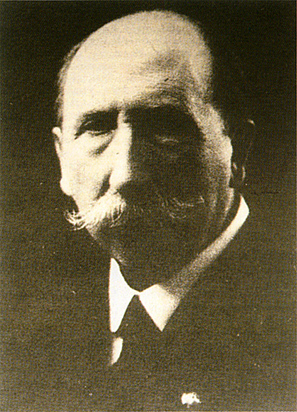
- Born: Justo Garrán Moso; 1867; Olite, Spain
- Died: 1942 (aged 74–75); Pamplona, Spain
- Occupations: Lawyer; publisher; politician
- Known for: politician
- Political party: PSP, Carlism

Justo Pastor Román Garrán Moso (1867–1942) was a Spanish Catholic lawyer, publisher and politician, related to Valladolid and Navarre. He owned and managed a local vallisoletano newspaper, Diario Regional (1908–1926). In terms of ideology he was closest to Traditionalism. In terms of politics Garrán approached various right-wing currents, in-between maurismo, Integrism, corporativist Christian Democracy, primoderiverismo and Francoism, yet he was most associated with Carlism. His career climaxed during two terms in the Cortes (1919–1920, 1923); he was also member of the primoderiverista quasi-parliament, Asamblea Nacional Consultiva (1928–1930). He served in the Navarrese self-government, Diputación Foral (1928–1930), and was member of the republican Tribunal de Garantías Constitucionales (1933–1936). Garrán was also the author of few theoretical treaties, dedicated to Church-state relations and to separate Basque-Navarrese legal establishments.

== Family and youth ==
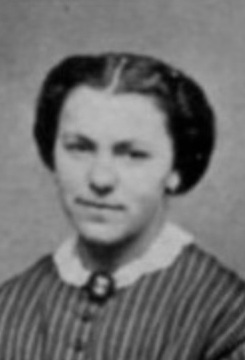
mother

The Garráns have been for generations related to Valladolid. Justo's great-grandfather, Nemesio Garrán Martínez, was regidor of the city, where he represented "artes y oficios"; in the Napoleonic period he voiced against resistance and advocated loyalty to “rey D. José Napoleon I". Justo's grandfather, Esteban Garrán Vitores (1797 -1865), was "propietario fabricante de sombreros" and in the 1830s also served as regidor. Justo's father, Mauricio Garrán Román (1827–1898), graduated as engineer; initially posted to Tarragona, he briefly worked as jefe of Obras Públicas in Pamplona and Burgos, until in the mid-1860s he assumed the same role in Barcelona. For some 10 years he was heavily involved in development of its harbor infrastructure and until today he is considered one of key people in its history. In the mid-1880s he moved to Ministerio de Ultramar and then Ministerio de Fomento, in the Caminos, Canales y Puertos section; he also published some works on engineering.

During his service in Navarre, Garrán Román married Josefa María Micaela Moso Navarlaz (1831–1921) from Olite. Her ancestors belonged to hidalguia related to Tafalla; the Navarlaz owned more land than the Moso. Her father, Juan Moso Villanueva, “tesorero de rentas”, acquired prestigious status when following death of her mother he remarried with descendant to Conde de Espoz y Mina. Mauricio Garrán Román and Micaela Moso Navarlaz will have 4 children; apart from Justo also Mauricio, María and Josefa. In line with professional assignments of Mauricio the family soon moved to Barcelona, where the young Justo spent his childhood and adolescence; he obtained bachillerato in Ciudad Condal, before they moved to Madrid. In the mid-1880s he enrolled in law at Universidad Central and was an excellent student. Garrán Moso graduated in 1891, with his thesis titled La división de poderes. El poder moderador. The same year he was admitted to Colegio de Abogados de Madrid. He was initially employed in the law firm of Germán Gamazo (in some sources "despacho Maura-Gamazo") before returning to Valladolid to open his own office.

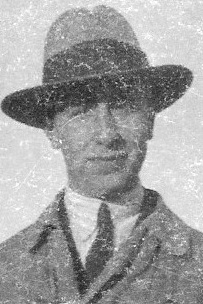
son Mauricio

In 1900 Justo Garrán married a Pamplonesa, Catalina Moso Subiza (1870-1925). Both were fairly closely related as they had the same grandfather, Juan Moso Villanueva; Justo was his descendant from the first marriage, and Catalina from the second one. Her father, II. Conde de Espoz y Mina, was a prestigious Navarrese aristocrat and served as diputado foral in the mid-1870s. The couple settled in Valladolid, where Justo practiced and owned urban real estates, inherited from his father, though from his maternal ancestors he inherited also some rural estate in Olite. Justo and Catalina had 3 children, born between 1901 and 1912: Mauricio, María and José Garrán Moso. Both sons engaged in Carlism and served as requetés during the civil war. José became a well-known Navarrese politician of early Francoism; he served as alcalde of Pamplona (1940–1941) and FET leader and civil governor of Biscay (1941–1942). None of Justo's grandchildren from Garrán Arraiza, Huarte Garrán and Garrán Sagarra families became a public figure.

== Early public engagements (until 1919) ==
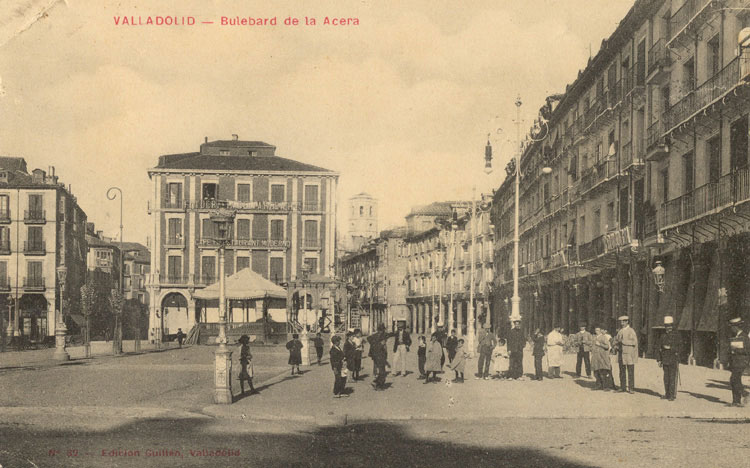
Valladolid, turn of the centuries

Garrán's ascendants were associated with Liberalism. His paternal grandfather commanded liberal militia during the First Carlist War, while his father was “un alfonsino declarado”; his maternal grandfather was related to the iconic liberal Espoz y Mina family. However, the young Justo did not follow suit. Already during his academic period he co-signed letters which protested alleged anti-religious governmental policy and were published in the Integrist (1885) or Catholic (1888) papers. Following death of his father, Garrán burnt his liberal books. In the 1890s he engaged in local Catholic organisations and emerged as their prominent member; in 1901 in name of Unión de Católicos de Valladolid he was signing various declarations. In the 1903 elections he ran for the Cortes as the Unión de Católicos candidate; he lost. In 1905 an Integrist newspaper claimed he would run again, this time as a Carlist candidate; it is not clear whether he lost or withdrew.

In the early 1900s Garrán engaged in a local daily flavored with Integrism, El Porvenir; at least since 1905 he was member of its “sociedad editora” and at least since 1906 he was its director. However, due to unspecified conflict within the board he stepped down in 1907. In 1908 and with his own money he set up a new daily, Diario Regional. It adhered to intransigent Catholic line and formed part of so-called “buena prensa”; according to contemporary scholar it advanced clericalism. Diario soon became a popular Valladolid newspaper; with the circulation of 5,000 it was second only to its main competitor, El Norte de Castilla, owned by a liberal political Santiago Alba. Garrán did not manage his newspaper on the commercial basis; he envisaged it as part of a religious mission, carefully vetted adverts in terms of morality and covered periodic debts with his own money. It is not clear whether Diario supported any specific political current. Apparently some readers associated it with Traditionalism; in 1910 the Carlist jefé regional thought it necessary to declare Diario Regional an “enemigo nuestro”, called all Carlists to stop reading it and Carlist newspapers to stop reprinting its articles.

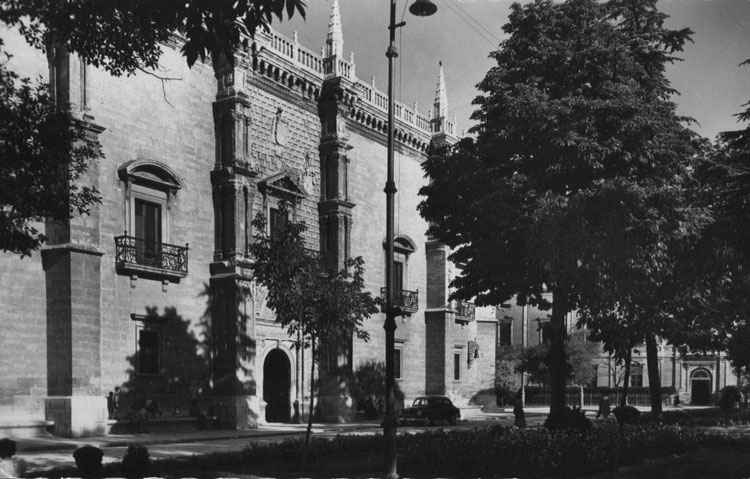
University of Valladolid

Having turned 40 Garrán was already a local prestigious vallisoletano figure. Since 1900 he was related to the local Universidad Literaria de Valladolid, first in Claustro de Doctores but in 1914 he was nominated catedrático numerario de derecho mercantil. He was in executive of numerous charity initiatives (like Patronado de Niños Desamparados de Valladolid), lay Catholic organisations (he served as secretary of Apostolado de Oración in Valladolid) and other associations (e.g. he remained active in the local branch of Liga Anti-duelista). As owner of numerous plots in the city, since 1907 he served also as vicepresidente of Asociación de Propietarios de Fincas Urbanas; in 1915 he entered the board of Banco Castellano. In the early 1910s he co-founded and animated the local branch of Acción Social Popular, though it was only in 1916 that he entered its Junta directiva. In 1918 he purchased El Porvenir and merged it with Diario Regional.

== Cortes deputy (1919-1923) ==
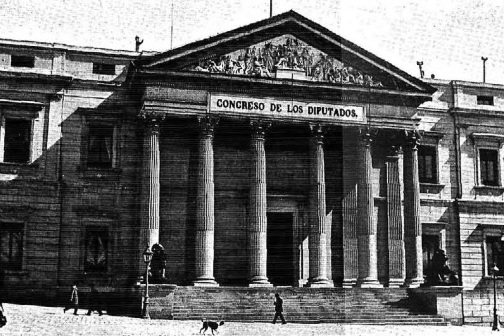
Congress of Deputies, 1910s

During the 1919 general elections Garrán fielded his candidature for Congress of Deputies, yet he was not formally associated with any political grouping. Some papers referred to him as to a “maurista”, member of a splinter right-wing faction of the decomposing Conservative Party, led by Antonio Maura. Others presented him as a candidate “de Acción Social Católica”. However, he was most frequently presented as “católico independiente” or simply as a Catholic politician. Garrán fared far worse than the maurista candidate Julio Pimentel and the liberal one Santiago Alba, but he narrowly managed to defeat another liberal competitor, Antonio Royo Villanova; he gathered 8.907 votes out of 22.491 votes in total. His tenure lasted slightly longer than a year, as the chamber was dissolved in 1920. During this period he barely made himself known, not a single time mentioned in the press.

Prior to the 1920 elections Garrán was expected to renew his bid from Valladolid, though according to some titles as “católico regionalista” he would rather run for the senate. Eventually he did not compete for the lower chamber, while it is not clear whether he took part in behind-the-scenes negotiations about the upper one. In the early 1920s he engaged in various initiatives calibrated as efforts to defuse social conflict by means of Christian teaching. He lectured in Casa Social Católica, spoke at “mitin social popular”, delivered address at the rally of ACNDP in Madrid. In 1922 he was among co-founders of Partido Social Popular, yet he did not assume any formal role in the party. However, according to some scholars in the early 1920s he rather moved from nascent Christian Democratic format to corporativismo. In 1923 he published Apuntes histórico críticos sobre las regalías de la corona, a treaty on relations between the state and the Church; the message was that the 1851 concordat was outdated and a new one was needed.

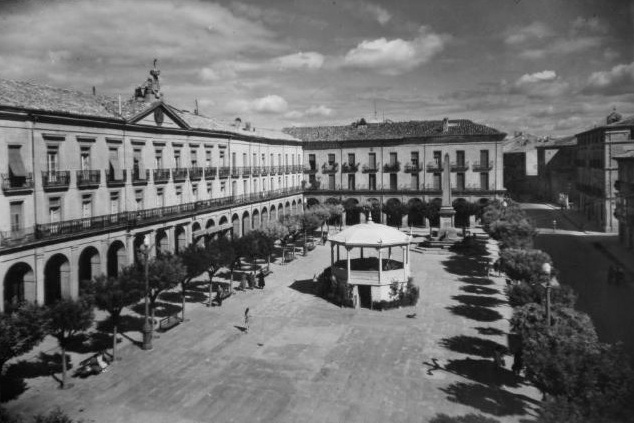
Tafalla, 1920s

In the last general elections held during the restoration era, in 1923, Garrán again appeared as “católico independente”, though some thought him "afín a mauristas". This time he decided to compete not in Valladolid, but in the Navarrese Tafalla, the electoral district which included his native Olite. His candidature was floated by the local Integrist politician José Sánchez Marco, and got endorsed by the Integrists. He ran under the "Dios, Patria y Fueros" motto and declared himself defender of Navarrese foralism. Initially he was pitted against a Carlist, Esteban Martínez-Velez; eventually the latter admitted that Garrán was “natural del país” and “católico-fuerista”, and withdrew in his favor. Also the conservative datista candidate Conde del Vado withdrew in favor of Garran. Eventually he competed against a liberal garciaprietista candidate Pedro Arza Uriz and emerged decisively victorious, having gathered 5.800 votes. This time his tenure in the Cortes was even shorter; he took the oath in May, but already in September the Primo de Rivera coup terminated the period of liberal democracy, resulting in dissolution of the parliament.

== Primoderiverista (1923-1931) ==
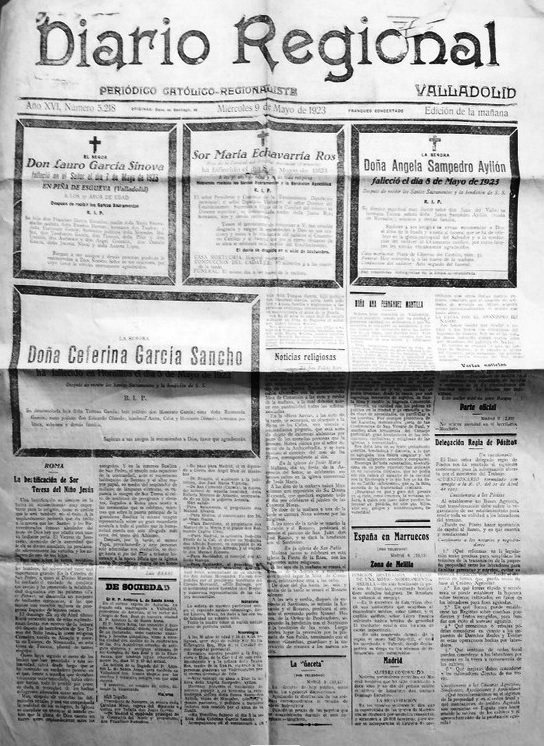
Diario Regional (1923)

Garrán with no reservations voiced in support of the dictatorship. In 1924 he was among co-founders of the Valladolid branch of Unión Patriótica (UP), the primoderiverista quasi-party. He took part in numerous local propaganda rallies which backed the Directorio, and as owner of Diario Regional he unequivocally promoted the new regime. However, since he kept running the newspaper as part of an apostolic pursuit, it was generating increasing losses that Garrán found more and more difficult to absorb. Eventually, following 18 years he withdrew from the project. In 1926 (some sources claim that in 1927) he sold the business to a newly set company, Diario Regional S.A.; its ownership was vastly dispersed among numerous members of local bourgeoisie; he retained the largest share of 4.8%.

In the mid-1920s Garrán renewed his relations with Navarre. In 1924 he published an article which advocated a Navarrese UP policy as not only maintenance of separate local establishments, but also restoration of the lost ones and creating new bodies; he called for a corporative regional parliament named Junta General del Reino. Present-day scholar considers the project “en la órbita del foralismo tradicionalista” and notes that it surely must have clashed with centralizing vision of the Directorio, which led to conflicts between Madrid and Pamplona over the new Estatuto Municipal and so-called cupo. However, this did not lead to deterioration of Garrán's position within the regime structures. The Navarrese UP branch launched his candidature for Diputación Foral, the local self-government, at the time its members appointed by the Ministry of Interior. He received support from 28 local ayuntamientos and in 1928 he was nominated as representative of the Tafalla merindad. His first step in the office was wiring the message of support to Primo. The same year the Diputación delegated him to Asamblea Nacional Consultiva, the quasi-parliament set by the regime.

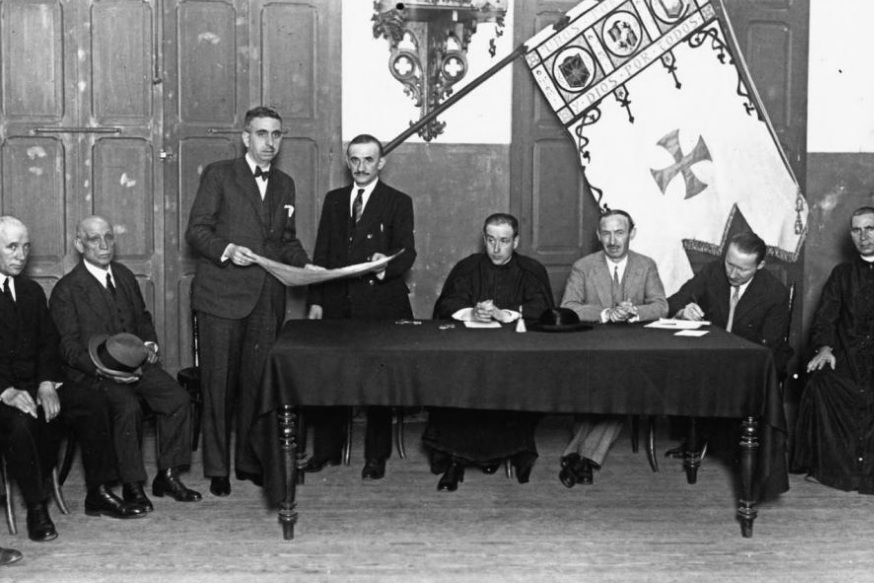
Garrán in La Conciliación, 1931

Though he continued with Valladolid-related roles in Asociación de Propietarios de Fincas Urbanas and Banco Castellano, in the late 1920s Garrán got increasingly engaged also in the Navarrese business. In 1929 he ascended to presidency of Federación Católico-Social de Navarra (FCSN), a powerful regional agricultural organisation, controlled by mid-size and large terratenientes; it grouped 99 Sindicatos Agrícolas or Cajas Rurales and had 13,291 members. He also lobbied for setup of a landholders’ organization, which would materialize in early 1931 as Asociación de Propietarios Terratenientes de Navarra, and entered the executive of Sociedad de Socorros Mutuos "La Conciliación". The fall of Primo marked a turn for the worse; in 1930 he lost the seat both in Diputación and in Asamblea; local press criticised Garrán for his support for the dictatorship. His presidency in FCSN expired either in 1930 or in 1931. In anticipation of forthcoming general elections, in February 1931 he was listed as one of prospective Pamplonese candidates (as “católico independiente”) to the Cortes.

== Carlist (1931-1936) ==
Carlist standard

In the newly established Second Republic initially Garrán was busy engaged against the secular governmental policy. In 1931 he signed numerous protest letters, either on his own behalf – e.g. in relation to would-be expulsion of religious orders, or in name of La Conciliación; the same year he joined Asociación Defensora de Religiosos Vasco-Navarros. At the time a plan for a Basque-Navarrese autonomous region was widely discussed. Its first version was drafted by Socieded de Estudios Vascos, the organisation where he hold membership; Garrán supported it and its modified version, named "Estatuto de Estella". However, once the statute has been rejected by the republican Cortes and appointed comisiones gestoras came out with a new draft, he firmly spoke against it; in his view this "estatuto nacionalista" promoted separatism and stripped the would-be autonomy of defensive measures versus the Madrid-advanced secularization; in 1932 Navarre opted out of the scheme.

In the early 1930s Garrán neared Carlism. In May 1932 he took part in a Valladolid meeting, which formally set up a regional branch of the united Carlist organisation, Comunión Tradicionalista. Later he presided over Carlist rallies in the city, e.g. in the local theatre or opening new premises. In 1933 he entered Consejo de Administración of Editorial Tradicionalista S.A., the Carlist publishing house. The same year Junta Regional Tradicionalista de Pamplona nominated him as candidate to Tribunal de Garantías Constitucionales, where he was elected from Navarre. In 1934 he gave lectures on Carlist doctrine, printed in the party newspaper El Pensamiento Navarro, served as presidente honorario of Centro Tradicionalista in Valladolid, and took part in a broadly-designed scheme of Traditionalist lectures across the country; he was assigned to a section dedicated to “orientación general”. However, according to some scholars he merely “se integró informalmente en el tradicionalismo”; some maintain that Garrán “no se declaró nunca carlista”, and some list him either among the Integrists or as part of generic right.

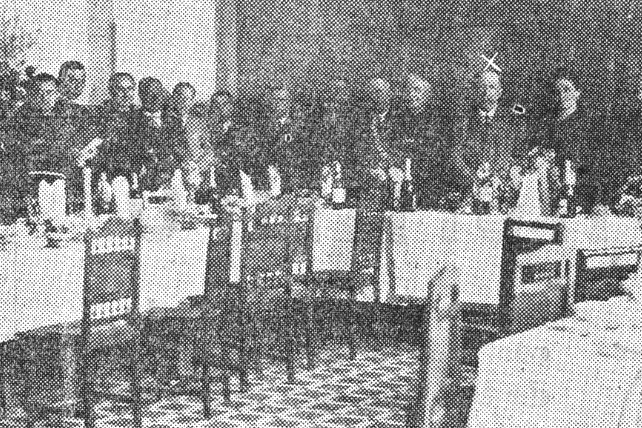
opening of Garrán-funded school in Olite, 1935 (he is marked with X)

In 1935 Garrán published in Pamplona a 300-page work, titled El Sistema Foral de Navarra y Provincias Vascongadas. It was a historiographic and juridical treaty on separate Basque-Navarrese legal establishments. Tailored as a response to Basque nationalist designs, stained by “los principios radicales y marxistas”, it advanced the vision of two separate paths. In case of Vasconia, Garrán advocated Junta General and Diputacion Foral for every province and the regional Consejo Vascongado, with sort of auxiliary role and minor legislative powers; the proposal was entirely incompatible with the project of Basque autonomy, at the time processed by the parliament. In case of Navarre, Garrán recommended re-establishment of Consejo Foral Administrativo as the regional executive. By scholars the scheme is described as “en la órbita del tradicionalismo”. The author called all Basques and Carlists to co-operate to bring the scheme to life. The work barely made an impact; though noticed in Navarrese papers, it was ignored among the Basque nationalists and the Madrid legislators.

== Last years (1936 and afterwards) ==
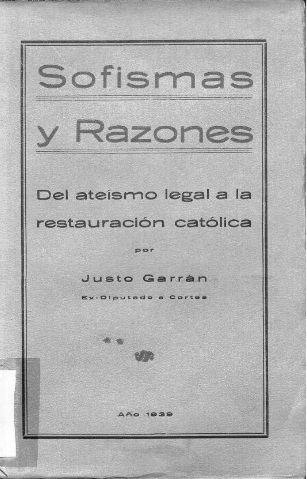
Sofizmas y Razones

During the July Coup Garrán resided in Valladolid, the city easily seized by the rebels. According to his daughter, during the mayhem that followed he sheltered numerous left-wingers in his house. In August 1936 Junta Central Carlista de Guerra de Navarra, the regional wartime Carlist executive, nominated him to Comisión para la Reintegración Foral. The task of this body was to work out the scheme of Basque-Navarrese status in the new Spain, yet there is no further information either on its works or on Garrán's role. In February 1937 general Dávila nominated him president of Tribunal Tutelar de Menores de Pamplona, a Navarrese corrective institution for minors; he would hold this position until death. In August 1937 a “Justo Garrán y Moso” was officially listed as alférez provisional. There is no further information on his public activities, either in politics or in business, except few isolated press notes on his taking part in Carlism-flavored cultural events.

In 1939 Garrán published a book, Sofismas y Razones. Del ateísmo legal a la restauración católica. The 280-page pamphlet, approved by ecclesiastic censhorship, was continuation of his 1923 work, Apuntes histórico críticos sobre las regalías de la corona, though this time the author focused mostly on culture and education in relations between the state and the Church. Formally fully aligned with propaganda of the emerging Francoist regime, the book contained numerous references to “glorioso Movimiento Nacional” and “el illustre Caudillo”. In terms of content, it was a call to do away with the 19th-century concordat and with all the secular republican legislation and to “reanudar la observancia de las festividades religiosas, dignificar el matrimonio cristiano y sanear con toda eficacia la enseñanza”. In terms of detailed solutions Garrán refrained from any suggestions, though the chapter La solución futura advanced a vision of friendly partnership between the state and the Church. In Falangist press the work was greeted with a lukewarm welcome as well-researched, but generally outdated.

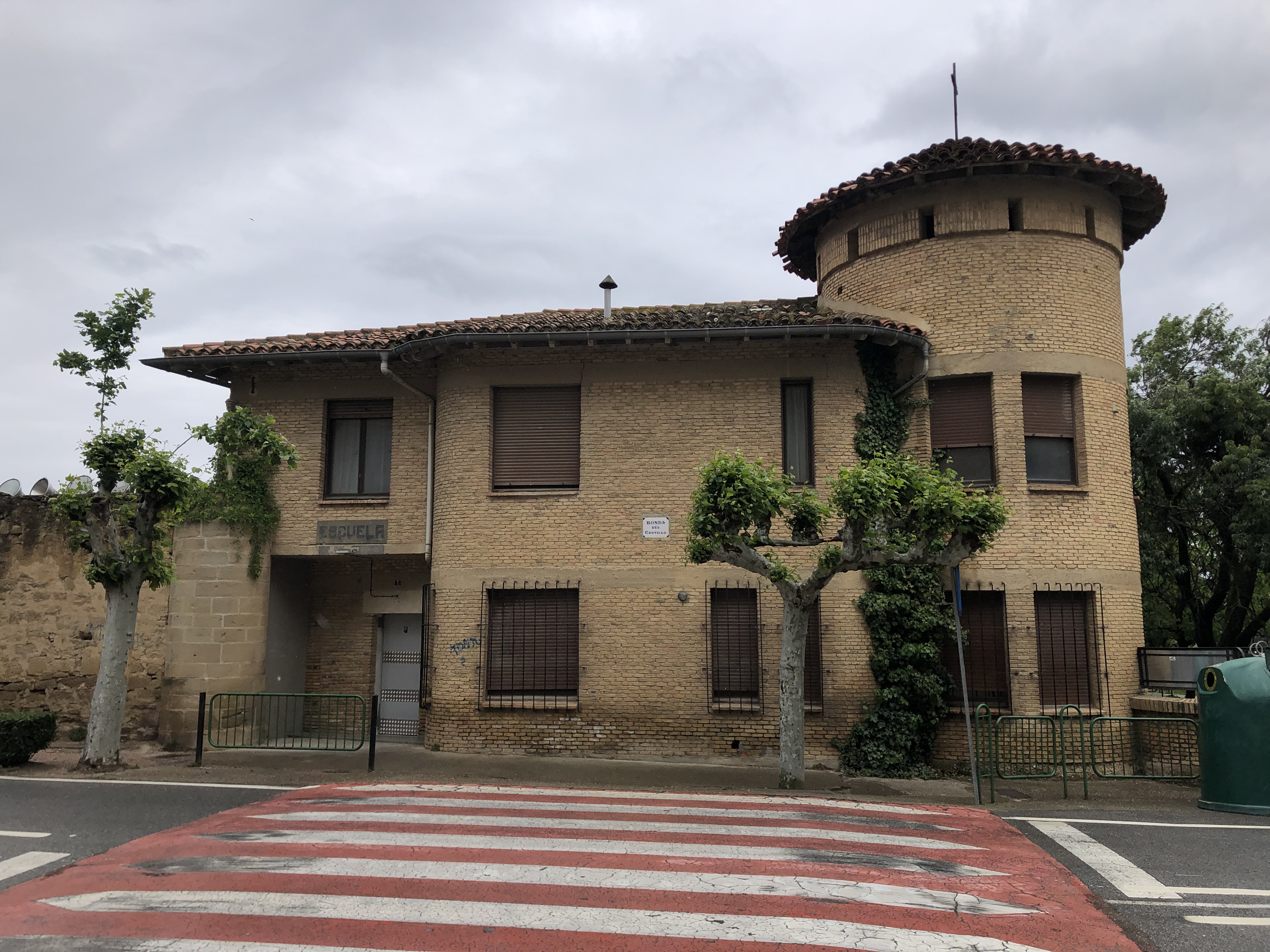
building of former Garrán-funded school in Olite, present view

At the turn of the decades Garrán withdrew into privacy, and it was his son José who briefly emerged as holder of high administrative positions in Navarre and Biscay. Justo limited himself to publishing few pieces in a Carlist periodical La Avalancha; he was last recorded in public discourse in 1941, as the author of an article on so-called ley paccionada, a Navarre-related regulation introduced 100 years earlier. Until death he presided over few local Catholic organisations. Garrán's passing away was not acknowledged in nationwide press; local Pamplona and Valladolid titles published rather brief obituary articles. Later his name went into almost total oblivion; except a large 1957 article in Diario Regional, which hailed Garrán as the founder of the daily, he disappeared from public discourse. Today his pamphlets might appear in bibliographic listings in works on fuerismo or state-Church relations; he earned very brief biographical pieces in few online encyclopedias and in one historiographic dictionary.

== See also ==
- Traditionalism
- Carlism
- Integrism
