= I Am Nevenka =

- Theatrical release poster
- Spanish: Soy Nevenka
- Directed by: Icíar Bollaín
- Written by: Icíar Bollaín; Isa Campo
- Based on: Hay algo que no es como me dicen: el caso Nevenka Fernández contra la realidad by Juan José Millás; El poder de la verdad by Nevenka Fernández
- Produced by: Koldo Zuazua; Juan Moreno; Guillermo Sempere
- Starring: Mireia Oriol; Urko Olazabal; Ricardo Gómez
- Cinematography: Gris Jordana
- Edited by: Nacho Ruiz Capillas
- Music by: Xavi Font
- Production companies: Kowalski Films; Feelgood Media; Nva Peli AIE
- Distributed by: Buena Vista International
- Release dates: 21 September 2024 (Zinemaldia); 27 September 2024 (Spain)
- Running time: 118 minutes
- Country: Spain
- Language: Spanish

I Am Nevenka (Spanish: Soy Nevenka) is a 2024 biographical drama film directed by Icíar Bollaín from a screenplay by Bollaín and Isa Campo starring Mireia Oriol and Urko Olazabal. It depicts the sexual harassment case involving Ismael Álvarez and Nevenka Fernández, respectively mayor and municipal councillor in the local government of Ponferrada, which elicited strong public scrutiny and controversy in early 21st-century Spain.

== Plot ==
The plot dramatizes the case of Nevenka Fernández, a young municipal finance councillor in Ponferrada who faced widespread scrutiny and societal backlash in Spain after filing a complaint against Mayor Ismael Álvarez for sexual harassment, winning her case notwithstanding.

== Cast ==
- Mireia Oriol as Nevenka Fernández
- Urko Olazabal as Ismael Álvarez
- Ricardo Gómez as Lucas
- Carlos Serrano
- Lucía Veiga as ̣Charo Velasco
- Luis Moreno
- Javier Gállego
- Mercedes del Castillo
- Font García

== Production ==
The screenplay was written by Icíar Bollaín alongside Isa Campo. The film is a Movistar Plus+ original produced by Kowalski Films, Feelgood Media, and Nva Peli AIE; in association with Garbo Produzioni. Shooting locations included Bilbao and Zamora.

== Release ==
I Am Nevenka was presented on 21 September 2024 at the 72nd San Sebastián International Film Festival, as a part of the festival's official selection. It also made it to the slate of the 20th Zurich Film Festival for its international premiere, and main competition section of 55th International Film Festival of India, where it competed for Golden Peacock award.

The film was released theatrically in Spain on 27 September 2024 by Buena Vista International. Epicentre Film acquired French rights to the film.

== Reception ==
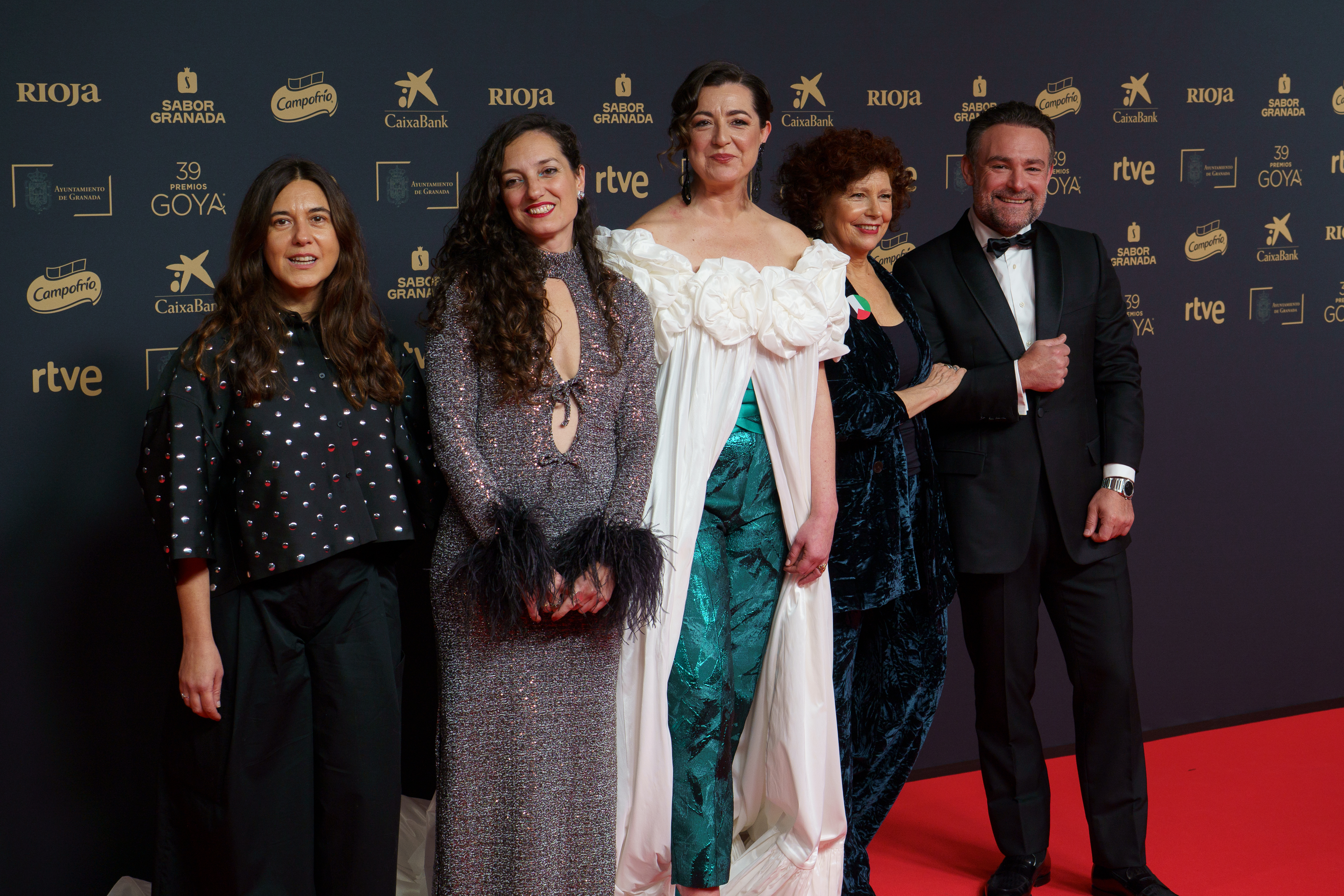
Campo, Jordana, Veiga, Bollaín, and Olazabal attending the 39th Goya Awards.

On the review aggregator website Rotten Tomatoes, 73% of 11 critics' reviews are positive, with an average rating of 6.1/10.

Alfonso Rivera of Cineuropa wrote that the film "is impeccably crafted", but "has a tendency to lean towards TV-movie territory, taking minimal risk in its mise-en-scène".

Eulàlia Iglesias of Fotogramas rated the film 3 out of 5 stars, highlighting Olazabal's performance as the best thing about the film, while considering that if you have seen the series, the film tastes of little.

Gregorio Belinchón of El País assessed that I Am Nevenka is "important and necessary, but cinema cannot be built from the label of 'a necessary film'", although, fortunately, the film overcomes this burden.

David Jenkins of Little White Lies commented that I Am Nevenka is "a trashy, tabloid-y film, but it's a fine one, and a story that still needs to be told again, and again, and again".

=== Accolades ===
Award	Ceremony date	Category	Recipient(s)	Result	Ref.
San Sebastián International Film Festival	28 September 2024	Golden Seashell	I Am Nevenka	Nominated	
San Sebastián International Film Festival	28 September 2024	Euskadi Basque Country 2030 Agenda Award	I Am Nevenka	Won	
International Film Festival of India	28 November 2024	Golden Peacock	I Am Nevenka	Nominated	
Forqué Awards	14 December 2024	Cinema and Education in Values	I Am Nevenka	Nominated	
Feroz Awards	25 January 2025	Best Main Actor in a Film	Urko Olazabal	Nominated	
CEC Medals	3 February 2025	Best Adapted Screenplay	Icíar Bollaín, Isa Campo	Nominated	
CEC Medals	3 February 2025	Best Actor	Urko Olazabal	Nominated	
CEC Medals	3 February 2025	Best New Actress	Lucía Veiga	Won	
Goya Awards	8 February 2025	Best Adapted Screenplay	Iciar Bollain, Isa Campo	Nominated	
Goya Awards	8 February 2025	Best Actor	Urko Olazabal	Nominated	
Goya Awards	8 February 2025	Best New Actress	Lucía Veiga	Nominated	
Goya Awards	8 February 2025	Best Cinematography	Gris Jordana	Nominated	
Actors and Actresses Union Awards	10 March 2025	Best Film Actor in a Leading Role	Urko Olazabal	Nominated	
Actors and Actresses Union Awards	10 March 2025	Best Film Actress in a Minor Role	Esther Isla	Won	
Platino Awards	27 April 2025	Film and Values Education	I Am Nevenka	Nominated	

== See also ==
- List of Spanish films of 2024
