= Nevenka Fernández =

Spanish economist (born 1974)

Councillor of Ponferrada
- In office 1999–2000

Personal details
- Born: Nevenka Fernández García; 25 October 1974 (age 52)
- Education: Universidad CEU San Pablo
- Occupation: Economist and politician

Nevenka Fernández García (born 25 October 1974) is a Spanish economist. She was the councillor of Finance of Ponferrada between 1999 and 2000.

Nevenka Fernández is known for being the first Spanish woman to obtain the conviction of a politician, Ismael Álvarez (mayor of Ponferrada for the People's Party), for sexual harassment.

== Career ==
With a degree in economics from the CEU-San Pablo University and a master's degree in Auditing from the Complutense University of Madrid, she worked at Arthur Andersen in Madrid. She finished her degree shortly before the 1999 municipal elections when Carlos López Riesco made her the offer to be number three on the list of the People's Party of Ponferrada led by Ismael Álvarez. After the electoral victory, she took over the Finance Department of the Ponferrada City Council.

In September 2000 she asked for a leave from the City Hall due to depression and in March 2001 she denounced Mayor Ismael Álvarez for sexual harassment.

After difficulties in finding work in Spain following the sexual harassment complaint, she emigrated to Chester, United Kingdom, and later to Ireland, where she currently lives.

== In popular culture ==
In 2024 the film I'm Nevenka was finished shooting, directed by Icíar Bollaín who co-wrote the script with Isa Campo. The film was shot in Zamora because no municipal permission was obtained to shoot it in Ponferrada. The actress who plays Nevenka is Mireia Oriol, while the actor Urko Olazabal plays Ismael Álvarez.

== See also ==
- 2024–2026 Spanish sexual misconduct allegations
- José Ángel González Jiménez
