= José Ignacio Landaluce =

Spanish politician

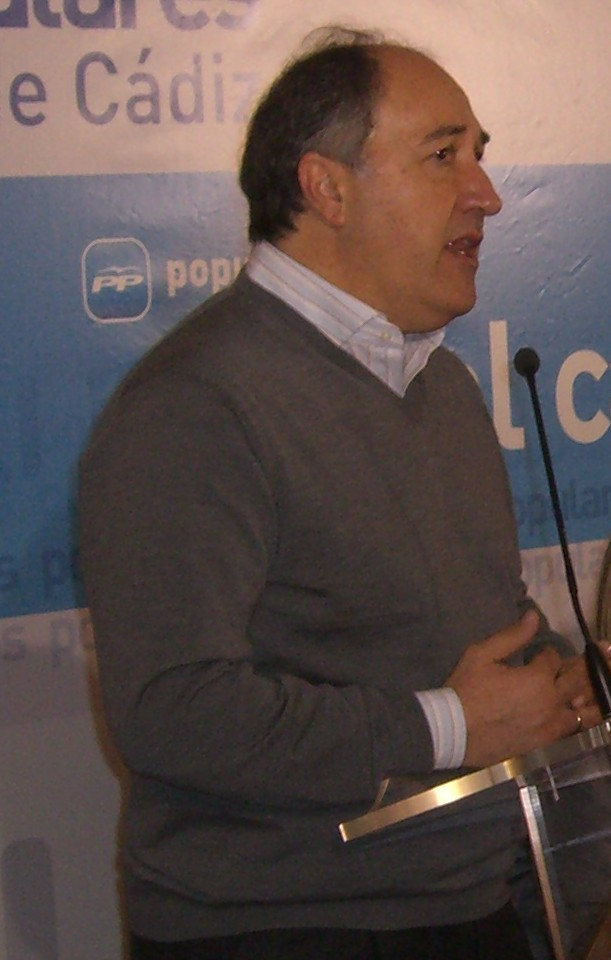

Mayor of Algeciras
- In office 2011–2026

Personal details
- Born: 1 February 1959 (age 67)
- Party: People's Party

José Ignacio Landaluce Calleja (born 1 February 1959) is a Spanish politician from the People's Party and surgeon who has been a member of the Congress of Deputies, representing Cadiz Province between 1996 and 2000 and from 2008 to 2015, and was the mayor of Algeciras until 2026.

Landaluce is known for his opposition to the British sovereignty of Gibraltar. The territory's Chief Minister said in 2023 that Landaluce has an "unhealthy obsession" with Gibraltar. From 2024 he was the subject of political scrutiny over alleged sexual harassment allegations.
