= Alejandro Royo-Villanova =

Spanish politician (1941–2026)

Member of the Congress of Deputies for Valladolid
- In office 12 November 1982 – 23 April 1986

Member of the Senate of Spain for Valladolid
- In office 11 November 1977 – 31 August 1982

Personal details
- Born: Alejandro Royo-Villanova Payá; 7 April 1941 Madrid, Spain
- Died: 5 August 2026 (aged 85) Cartagena, Spain
- Party: PP; UCD
- Education: Complutense University of Madrid (Lic.); University of Strasbourg
- Occupation: Lawyer

Alejandro Royo-Villanova Payá (7 April 1941 – 5 August 2026) was a Spanish politician. A member of the People's Party and the Union of the Democratic Centre, he served in the Senate from 1977 to 1982 and in the Congress of Deputies from 1982 to 1986.

Royo-Villanova died in Cartagena on 5 August 2026, at the age of 85.
