= The Pact (2018 Spanish film) =

- Theatrical release poster
- Spanish: El pacto
- Directed by: David Victori
- Written by: Jordi Vallejo; David Victori
- Produced by: Edmon Roch; Jordi Gasull; Victoria Borrás
- Starring: Belén Rueda; Darío Grandinetti; Mireia Oriol
- Cinematography: Elías M. Félix
- Edited by: Guillermo de la Cal; David Victori
- Music by: Miquel Coll i Trulls
- Production companies: Ikiru Films; 4Cats Pictures; Sony Pictures International Productions; El Pacto La Película AIE
- Distributed by: Sony Pictures Entertainment Iberia
- Release date: 17 August 2018
- Country: Spain
- Language: Spanish

The Pact (Spanish: El pacto) is a 2018 Spanish supernatural horror thriller film directed by David Victori which stars Belén Rueda, Darío Grandinetti and Mireia Oriol.

== Plot ==
Desperately seeking to save the life of her ailing daughter Clara, who has just entered a coma, Mónica strikes a Faustian-like bargain that entails the prospect of beginning to kill people.

== Cast ==
- Belén Rueda as Mónica
- Darío Grandinetti as Álex
- Mireia Oriol as Clara
- Jordi Recasens as Fran
- Patxi Santamaria as Santero
- Antonio Durán "Morris"
- Carlus Fàbrega
- Josean Bengoetxea
- Vanessa Buchaca
- Frederic Llobregat

== Production ==
The Pact, David Victori's directorial feature debut, is an Ikiru Films, 4Cats Pictures, Sony Pictures International Productions and El Pacto La Película AIE production, with the participation of TVE, TVC, Movistar+ and Vodafone and support from ICAA and ICEC. Shooting wrapped in 2017; shooting locations included Barcelona.

== Release ==
Distributed by Sony Pictures Entertainment Iberia, the film was theatrically released on 17 August 2018 in Spain, where it grossed €447,210 in the opening weekend, good enough for a top-4 picture in the box office.

== Reception ==
Beatriz Martínez of Fotogramas scored 3 out of 5 stars, highlighting the power of the moral questions the film raises as well as Belén Rueda's performance as the best things about the film while considering the film's lack of originality as a drawback, writing that the film "suffers from its formulaic nature and the repetition of patterns".

Jordi Costa of El País suggested that the people behind the film were seeking a market-driven approach by "reiterating formulas that have previously proven their cost-effectiveness and solvency" but that, even if there is nothing wrong with the former, "the problem is that there is also nothing really disturbing, potentially Luciferian" in the film.

Reviewing for El Mundo's magazine Metrópoli, Francisco Marinero rated the film with 1 out of 5 stars writing about "a diffuse plot in which Belén Rueda shines for her way of playing the film's protagonist with talent, which has now become a profession".

Jonathan Holland of The Hollywood Reporter described The Pact as "elegant, very atmospheric and cleverly worked out", but "surprisingly" failing at delivering "the emotional connections that could have taken it to the next level".

== See also ==
- List of Spanish films of 2018
