= Ismael Álvarez (politician) =

Spanish politician (born 1950)

Ismael Álvarez Rodríguez (born 13 July 1950) is a Spanish former politician. As a member of the People's Party, he was a councillor in Ponferrada between 1991 and 2002, and the city's mayor from 1995. He was also a member of the Cortes of Castile and León from 1999 to 2002, and of the Senate of Spain from 1993 to 1996.

In 2002, Álvarez was convicted of the sexual harassment of Nevenka Fernández, a councillor in his local government. He was the first Spanish politician to be convicted of the offence, and resigned his offices. He returned to politics as the leader of a localist party and was re-elected to the council in 2011, resigning in 2013 per a pact with the Spanish Socialist Workers' Party.

== Biography ==
=== Early life and career ===
Álvarez was born in Dehesas (León) in Ponferrada. He graduated with a law degree.

Running for the People's Party (PP), he was elected to the city council in 1991 and was the leader of the opposition to Celso López Gavela, mayor since 1979 of the Spanish Socialist Workers' Party (PSOE). In 1995, López Gavela did not run and the PP gained three seats, making Álvarez mayor. As mayor, he had factories opened in the city to counteract the decline of the mining industry.

=== Sexual harassment conviction ===
In March 2001, Nevenka Fernández, the councillor in charge of finances in Álvarez's government, resigned and accused him of a year-long campaign of sexual harassment. He was convicted in May 2002. In November 2003, the Supreme Court of Spain upheld his conviction but reduced the punishment upon ruling that there was not an abuse of authority; his fine was reduced from €6,480 to €2,160, in addition to €12,000 compensation to Fernández.

The case resulted in the first conviction of a Spanish politician for sexual harassment. In 2024, the case was portrayed in the film I'm Nevenka, with Urko Olazabal as Álvarez.

=== Return to politics ===
In September 2010, Álvarez announced he would be running for a new party in the 2011 local elections. His Independientes Agrupados de Ponferrada (IAP) won five seats and held the balance of power, allowing Carlos López Riesco to become mayor. On 9 March 2013, after supporting a PSOE motion to remove López Riesco and replace him with Samuel Folgueral Arias, he resigned per the agreement. In April 2015, he announced that his party would dissolve and not contest the upcoming election.
