= José Ángel Alonso Pérez =

Spanish politician (born 1993)

Member of the Senate
- Incumbent
- Assumed office 17 August 2023
- Constituency: Valladolid
- In office 21 May 2019 – 24 September 2019
- Constituency: Valladolid

Member of the Congress of Deputies
- In office 3 December 2019 – 17 August 2023
- Constituency: Valladolid

Personal details
- Born: 22 February 1993 (age 33)
- Party: People's Party

José Ángel Alonso Pérez (born 22 February 1993) is a Spanish politician. He has been a member of the Senate since 2023, having previously served from May to September 2019. From 2019 to 2023, he was a member of the Congress of Deputies. He has served as mayor of Villalón de Campos since 2015.
