= El Norte de Castilla =

Spanish newspaper

- Type: Daily newspaper
- Owner: Grupo Vocento
- President: Alejandro Royo-Villanova
- Editor-in-chief: Angel Ortiz
- Founded: 1854
- Language: Spanish
- Headquarters: Valladolid, Castile and León, Spain
- Circulation: 18,000 (as of 2024)
- Website: elnortedecastilla.es

El Norte de Castilla (transl. The North of Castile) is a Spanish-language daily newspaper based in Valladolid, Spain. After Faro de Vigo, founded in 1853, El Norte de Castilla is one of the oldest daily newspapers in the country, tracing its origins to 1854. The main edition is published in Valladolid, but editions are published for Palencia, Salamanca, and Segovia. The paper has a widely accessed Spanish-language website and is considered to be the most reliable and influential periodical in Castile.

== History ==
The newspaper can be traced to 1854, when Mariano Pérez Mínguez and Pascual Pastor created El Avisador ("The Reminder"). In 1856, this paper merged with a local competitor, El Correo de Castilla ("The Castile Courier"). El Norte de Castilla was established in April 1856 by the amalgamation of these two papers; the first issue of the newly formed paper was published on 17 October 1856. In 1870, the paper was acquired by Gaviria and Zapatero, and was sold in 1893 to César Silió y Cortés and Santiago Alba y Bonifaz, who would both later become Ministers of the President. They occupied the positions of director and manager, respectively. It was under their leadership that the paper was published daily.

Cortés was replaced in his position by Antonio Royo Villanova, of whom the present chairman of the board, Alejandro Royo-Villanova, is a descendant.

From 1958 to 1963, the director was Miguel Delibes, who later become one of Spain's greatest novelists. Among the young journalists then working for Delibes, Francisco Umbral started here, leaving for Madrid in 1961, where he became a writer, and Manu Leguineche would become a war correspondent. From 1963 to 1967, Delibes's position was filled by Félix Antonio González, a Spanish poet. In 1992, the publication was integrated into the "Grupo Correo", which was later subsumed by Grupo Vocento. The illustrator José Orcajo was a cartoonist at the paper at this time.

As of March 2014 the chairman of the board was Alejandro Royo-Villanova, and the CEO was Ángel de las Heras.

El Norte de Castilla launched its digital edition in 1997. Its web page offers three primary services: multimedia service, interactivity with subscribers via blogs, and hypertext interpolation. The website is ranked as the 24,055th most visited website in the world, and the 703rd most visited in Spain.
