= Mireia Oriol =

Catalan actress

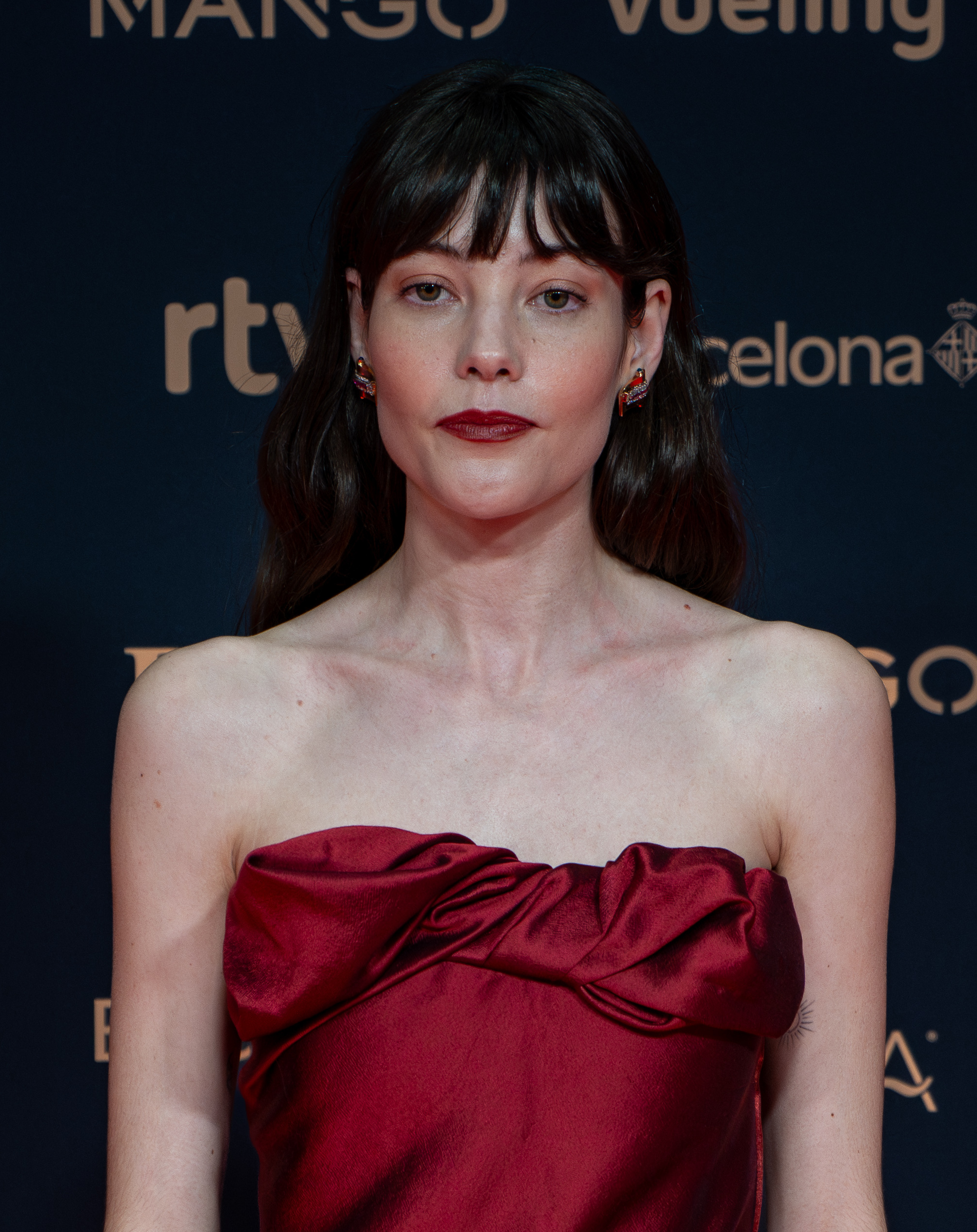
- Oriol in 2026
- Born: 1996 (age 29–30); Argentona, Catalonia, Spain
- Occupation: Actress

Mireia Oriol (born 1996) is a Spanish actress from Catalonia.

== Life and career ==
Oriol was born in Argentona, Maresme in 1996. She made her feature film debut as an actress at age 13 in horror picture ESO, Entidad Sobrenatural Oculta (2009), portraying a ghost girl. She began working as a model at age 16. She began a degree in audiovisual studies in Barcelona and later, at age 20, she joined the Giles Foreman Acting Centre for Acting in London, where she lived for two years.

Her sophomore acting credit in a feature film was in supernatural thriller The Pact (2018), starring as Clara alongside Belén Rueda and Darío Grandinetti. Early television work include performances in Catalan soap opera Com si fos ahir (2018) and Flooxer miniseries Terror.app. She made her directorial debut by co-helming the short film Sans moi je n'existe pas. She earned recognition for her portrayal of Lorena in Catalan sports drama series The Hockey Girls. In 2020, she featured in films Tocats pel foc and The Art of Return. In 2022, she starred as the title character in supernatural thriller series Alma (aka The Girl in the Mirror), earning a Zapping Award for Best Actress for her performance. In 2023 she starred as Fiona in TV3 series La mirada de la Fiona. In 2024, she was cast to star as Nevenka Fernández in Icíar Bollaín's re-telling of a famous case of sexual harassment in the Ayuntamiento of Ponferrada in I'm Nevenka.
