= All Spain Bar Examination =

Spanish law examination

- Type: Public examination
- Administrator: Government of Spain; Ministry of Justice
- Skills tested: Law; Legal Topics; Common legal subjects Specific legal subjects
- Purpose: admission to legal practice in Spain
- Year started: 2014 (11 years ago)
- Duration: 4 hours
- Offered: Once a year
- Restrictions on attempts: No Limits
- Regions: Spain
- Languages: Spanish; Catalan; Galician; Basque
- Prerequisites: Must hold a bachelor's degree in Law, a master's degree in Law and Legal Practice and have done a legal internship
- Fee: Yes
- Website: Ministry of Justice - All Spain Bar Examination

The All Spain Bar Examination is a public examination in Spain for the admission to practice law and obtaining the lawyer's license.

After passing the examination, the candidate is issued the lawyer's license and is able to practice law throughout all Spain.

The bar examination is convened and conducted by the Ministry of Justice. It is a single examination for the entire territory of Spain and for all aspiring lawyers from all over Spain. The examination takes place at the same time throughout Spanish territory. There are around twenty examination centers throughout Spain. The examination is called annually (once a year).

The first time the examination was carried out was in 2014. It is also called "entrance examination" ("entrance" to the legal practice).

== Objective ==
All Spain Bar Examination is a certification exam conducted once a year by Ministry of Justice of Spain for law graduates willing to start practice of profession as Lawyer. The exam is conducted to assess basic level knowledge of a member and lay down minimum benchmark for entering into practice of law in addition to assessing candidate's analytical skills. After passing the bar examination, the candidate is awarded certificate of practice by the Ministry of Justice of Spain.

== Eligibility ==
To be a candidate for the bar examination and attend it, applicants must meet the following requirements: must hold a bachelor's degree in law (4 years), a master's degree in Law and Legal Practice (2 years) and have done a legal internship in a law firm (6 months). Once the candidate has the official titles (certificate) of the bachelor's degree and the master's degree, and has done the legal internship, would be able to enroll the examination.

In addition to the above, the candidate must be of legal age, and not be disqualified from legal practice by court ruling.

== Backgrounds ==
Law 34/2006, of October 30, on admission to legal practice and Royal Decree 775/2011, of June 3, on the regulation of admission to legal practice, reformed the admission system to legal practice in Spain. Among others, they created a public bar examination, a single exam for all of Spain, in which applicants had to demonstrate their aptitude for legal practice, and whose passing would lead to the issuance of a lawyer's license.

According to article 17 of the Royal Decree 775/2011, of 3 June, the exam is written and consists of two parts that are done on the same day. The first exercise consists of an objective test of multiple answers and the second exercise of the evaluation will consist of solving a practical case previously chosen by the applicant among several alternatives.

The examination model was developed with the Resolution of September 7, 2012, of the General Directorate of Relations with the Administration of Justice, which established all the content of the test.

Article 8 of the Resolution established that the aptitude test would consist of two phases:

- The first phase will consist of the resolution, in writing and in Spanish, of a practical case, to be chosen from among those proposed by the Evaluation Commission. The Evaluation Commission will choose from among these subjects those topics that, due to their essentially practical content, must be the subject of the test, and may opt for the selection of different assumptions and practical cases depending on the number of applicants and the training they have accredited. Applicants will have a maximum of six hours to resolve the practical case.
- The second phase will consist of the reading of the exercise carried out, before the Evaluation Commission, which may open a question session about the object of the test, as well as about the Spanish Judicial Organization and Professional Deontology, for a maximum period of fifteen minutes.

However, the current model of the test was established in 2014. Royal Decree 150/2014, of March 7, modified article 17, modifying the exam model. Royal Decree 150/2014 established that the state test would consist of "an objective written test of theoretical-practical content with multiple responses."

== Examination model ==
The examination is based on the resolution of different questions and practical legal cases with a multiple choice answer. The evaluation has a total duration of 4 hours. The examination consists of:

- 50 questions on «Common subjects to the legal practice».
- 25 questions on «Specific subjects» (according to the legal specialty that the candidate has chosen)

In addition, the questionnaire includes six reservation questions for the section «Common subjects exercising the legal profession» and two for each legal specialty of the section «Specific subjects».

In the part of «Common subjects to the legal practice» the examination content includes subjects and topics such as: European Union Law, International Law, Constitutional Law, Professional Ethics, Professional Standards, ...

On the other hand, for the «Specific subjects», candidates must choose a legal specialty for the exam. The legal specialties in the exam are grouped into the following four:

- civil law and commercial law (and civil procedural law)
- criminal law (and criminal procedural law)
- administrative law, public law and tax law (and administrative procedural law)
- labour law (and labour procedural law)

== Bar examination controversies ==
The Spanish lawyers asked many years ago for an exam to regulate admission to the legal practice, but many took this examination as a screen that limits the possibilities of being admitted to practice.

In 2017, in the face of many complaints from the Spanish lawyers community calling the exam "easy", the Minister of Justice Rafael Catalá toughened the exam, but even so it did not satisfy the Spanish lawyers community and the Minister said that he would take measures and raise the degree of difficulty. That year, in 2017, there were 5,400 candidates to the examination.

Another controversy arose over the place and language of the tests. At first, the bar examination could only be taken in Madrid and in Spanish language. Candidates who lived far away or who studied law in one of the other languages of Spain complained, so other locations were set up to take the bar examination and from that moment the examination could be done in Spanish, Catalan, Galician and Basque.

Due to the high percentage of people who sit and pass the exam (in the 2018 call, 77.6% of applicants passed the exam, but 97.3% were eligible to practice, given that it is a weighted grade), the Spanish lawyers community filed several complaints and is currently negotiating a new, tougher entrance test with the Ministry of Justice.

In 2020, due to the COVID-19 pandemic, the bar examination was postponed until July (it is normally carried out in March).

In 2023, the content of the exam was expanded with more topics and questions.

== See also ==
- General Council of Spanish Lawyers
