= Valladolid (Senate constituency) =

Senate of Spain constituency

Coordinates: 41°35′N 4°40′W

- Senate of Spain; Electoral constituency
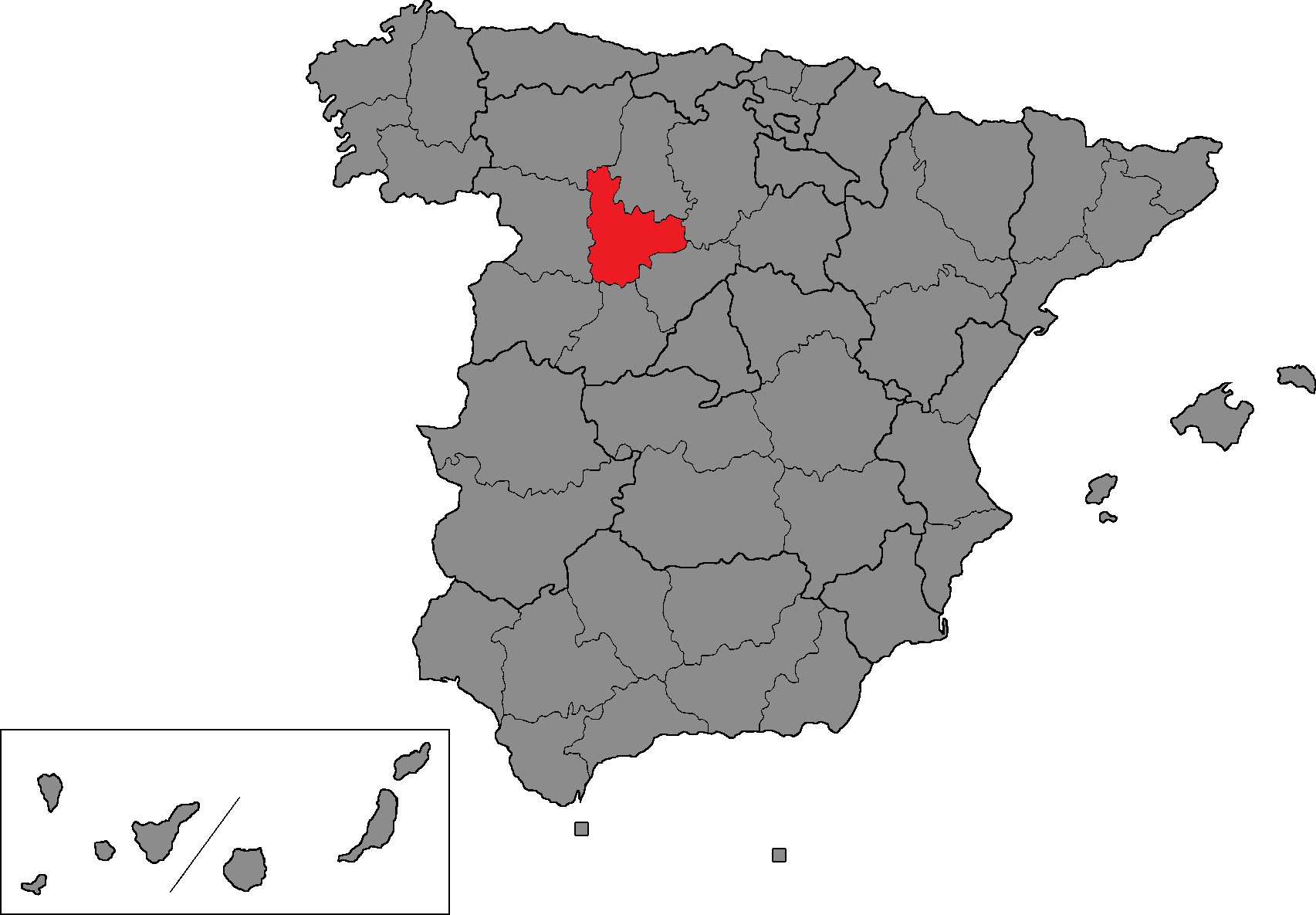
- Location of Valladolid within Spain
- Province: Valladolid
- Autonomous community: Castile and León
- Population: ▲525,398 (2024)
- Electorate: ▼431,381 (2023)
- Major settlements: Valladolid, Medina del Campo, Laguna de Duero

Current constituency
- Created: 1977
- Seats: 4
- Members: PP (3); PSOE (1)

Valladolid is one of the 60 constituencies represented in the Senate of Spain, the upper chamber of the Spanish parliament, the Cortes Generales. The constituency (whose boundaries correspond to those of the homonymous province) elects four senators. The electoral system uses open-list (Note: Parties can group candidates into lists, although each candidate is treated separately for the purpose of the voting procedure.) partial block voting, with electors voting for individual candidates instead of parties. Electors can vote for up to three candidates.

== Electoral system ==
The constituency was created as per the Political Reform Law and was first contested in the 1977 general election. The Law provided for the provinces of Spain to be established as multi-member districts in the Senate, with this regulation being maintained under the Spanish Constitution of 1978. Additionally, the Constitution requires for any modification of the provincial limits to be approved under an organic law, needing an absolute majority in the Cortes Generales.

Voting is based on universal suffrage, comprising all Spanish nationals over 18 years of age with full political rights, provided that they have not been deprived of the right to vote by a final sentence. The only exception was in 1977, when this was limited to nationals over 21 years of age and in full enjoyment of their political and civil rights. Amendments in 2011 required non-resident citizens to apply for voting, a system known as "begged" voting (Spanish: Voto rogado). which was abolished in 2022. Further, amendments in 2018 granted the right to vote to those legally incapacitated. 209 Senate seats (207 in 1977, 208 from 1978 to 2026) are elected using open-list partial block voting: voters in constituencies electing four seats can choose up to three candidates; in those with two or three seats, up to two; and in single-member districts, one. Each of the 47 peninsular provinces is allocated four seats, while in insular provinces—such as the Balearic and Canary Islands—the districts are the islands themselves, with the larger ones (Mallorca, Gran Canaria and Tenerife) being allocated three seats each, and the smaller ones (Menorca, Ibiza, Formentera, Fuerteventura, La Gomera, El Hierro, Lanzarote and La Palma) one each. (Note: La Gomera and El Hierro comprised a single constituency for the 1977 election. A constitutional reform in 2026 awarded Formentera an independent senator separate from Ibiza.) Ceuta and Melilla elect two seats each. Until 1985, the law also provided for by-elections to fill Senate seats vacated up to two years into the legislature; subsequently, any vacancies arising after the proclamation of candidates and during the legislative term are filled by the next candidates on the party lists or, when required, by designated substitutes.

The electoral law allows for parties and federations registered in the interior ministry, alliances and groupings of electors to present lists of candidates. Parties and federations intending to form an alliance are required to inform the relevant electoral commission within 10 days of the election call—15 before 1985—whereas groupings of electors need to secure the signature of at least one percent of the electorate in the constituencies for which they seek election—one permille of the electorate, with a compulsory minimum of 500 signatures, until 1985—disallowing electors from signing for more than one list. Also since 2011, parties, federations or alliances that have not obtained a mandate in either chamber of the Cortes at the preceding election are required to secure the signature of at least 0.1 percent of electors in the aforementioned constituencies. Amendments in 2007 required a balanced composition of men and women in the electoral lists, so that candidates of either sex made up at least 40 percent of the total composition; further amendments in 2024 required the use of a zipper system.

== Senators ==
Senators for Valladolid 1977–
Key to parties PSOE UCD PP CP AP
Legislature	Election	Distribution
Constituent	1977	1 / 3
1st	1979	1 / 3
2nd	1982	3 / 1
3rd	1986	3 / 1
4th	1989	1 / 3
5th	1993	1 / 3
6th	1996	1 / 3
7th	2000	1 / 3
8th	2004	1 / 3
9th	2008	1 / 3
10th	2011	1 / 3
11th	2015	1 / 3
12th	2016	1 / 3
13th	2019 (Apr)	3 / 1
14th	2019 (Nov)	1 / 3
15th	2023	1 / 3

== General elections ==
=== 2023 ===
Summary of the 23 July 2023 Senate of Spain election results
Candidates	Parties and coalitions	Popular vote	
Candidates	Parties and coalitions	Votes	%
Jesús Julio Carnero García	PP	129,458	41.95
José Ángel Alonso Pérez	PP	128,009	41.48
María Arenales Serrano Argüello	PP	126,238	40.90
José Javier Izquierdo Roncero	PSOE	104,749	33.94
• Sara María Galván Lobato	PSOE	102,798	33.31
• Marcial Barba González	PSOE	96,180	31.16
• Luis Alberto Matarranz Herreras	Vox	40,450	13.10
• Víctor Miguel Menéndez Quintana	Vox	37,029	11.99
• Marina Fernández Salvador	Vox	36,175	11.72
• Marina Echebarria Sáenz	Sumar	28,097	9.10
• José Ángel García De La Parte	Sumar	21,541	6.98
• Rosana De Castro Blanco	Sumar	20,824	6.74
• María José Vían Del Pozo	EV	3,318	1.07
• Juan Carlos Viña Muñoz	PACMA	2,074	0.67
• David San José Lobato	EV	1,942	0.62
• María Aránzazu López Escudero	PACMA	1,740	0.56
• Arturo González Sanz	EV	1,562	0.50
• Leticia Fernández Fernández	None of the Above	1,367	0.44
• José María Viña Muñoz	PACMA	1,171	0.37
• Lorena Moratinos Delgado	UdCa	1,148	0.37
• José Merida de la Fuente	None of the Above	904	0.29
• David Núñez Muñoz	PCTE	890	0.28
• José Ignacio Miguel Pampliega	PUM+J	838	0.27
• Eva Molledo Gaite	None of the Above	811	0.26
• Óscar Sánchez Rico	FE de las JONS	645	0.20
• Jovino Noval Ordoñez	UdCa	599	0.19
• Isaías Frías Cousillas	Recortes Cero	415	0.13
Blank ballots		4,847	1.57
Total		895,819	
Valid votes		308,588	98.05
Invalid votes		6,119	1.94
Votes cast / turnout		314,707	75.86
Abstentions		100,103	24.13
Registered voters		414,810	

== Bibliography ==
- Ley 1/1977, de 4 de enero, para la Reforma Política (Fundamental Law 1/1977). Official State Gazette (in Spanish). 4 January 1977. BOE-A-1977-165.
- Real Decreto-ley 20/1977, de 18 de marzo, sobre Normas Electorales (Royal Decree-Law 20/1977). Official State Gazette (in Spanish). 18 March 1977. BOE-A-1977-7445.
- Constitución Española (Constitution). Official State Gazette (in Spanish). 27 December 1978. BOE-A-1978-31229.
- Ley Orgánica 5/1985, de 19 de junio, del Régimen Electoral General (Organic Law 5/1985). Official State Gazette (in Spanish). 19 June 1985. BOE-A-1985-11672.
- Carreras de Odriozola, Albert; Tafunell Sambola, Xavier (2005) [1989]. Estadísticas históricas de España, siglos XIX-XX (PDF) (in Spanish). Vol. 1 (II ed.). Bilbao: Fundación BBVA. pp. 1072–1097. ISBN 84-96515-00-1. Archived from the original (PDF) on 24 September 2015.
