= Admission to legal practice in Spain =

The admission to legal practice in Spain is the legal prerequisites that must be followed in Spain for the admission to practice law, for receiving a license to practice law.

In Spain, in order for lawyers to practice law they must be in possession of the Lawyer's Professional Title (lawyer's license) and they must be joined to a bar association of Spain (any of the 83 bar associations of Spain). In Spain it is compulsory (legally mandatory) to be joined to a bar association (it could be any of all Spain). In total there are 6 years of training in order to practice law.

In order to practice law (and to get the lawyer's license), the following requirements are necessary (legally mandatory): a bachelor's degree in law (4 years), a master's degree in Law and Legal Practice (2 years), a legal internship (6 months, within those two years) and passing the All Spain Bar Examination (convened annually by the Government of Spain). Once the bar examination has been passed, the Minister of Justice issues the Lawyer's Professional Title (lawyer's license). Finally, with the lawyer's title, one can join any bar association and practice law.

In Spain, in total there are 6 years of training in order to practice law. The current system was created by the Law 34/2006 and the Royal Decree 775/2011, of 3 June. The first time the All Spain Bar Examination was convened (the new system) was in 2014 by virtue of the Royal Decree 150/2014, of March 7.

The current system had a gradual implementation (from 2006 to 2014). In 2006 the Law that established the new access was approved, in 2011 the complementary application regulations were approved and finally in 2014 it was fully implemented with additional rules of execution.

== Background ==
Until 2011, a person could gain access to the legal profession and become a lawyer just with the Licenciate Degree in Law (Licenciatura en Derecho), not to be confused with the current bachelor's degree (Bolonia). It was possible for new graduates to just join any Bar Association and practice law.

This situation however, involved an imbalance in the system of accessing the legal profession between countries because there were countries where you could practice law directly with only a law degree (Spain), while in others, a postgraduate degree was required, and in others, a postgraduate degree and state examination. This imbalanced situation brought many foreign citizens, in whose countries postgraduate and state examination was required, to Spain and through this legal loophole they acceded to legal practice without postgraduate or state examination.

However, with the entry into the European Union, which sought political and economic integration, the Bologna Process arrived and unified ways of accessing legal practice in European countries. To this we must also add the complaints of the legal profession in Spain (many lawyers put pressure on the government). For all this, the access system was changed.

The EU's Directive 2005/36/EC of the European Parliament and of the Council of 7 September 2005 on the recognition of professional qualifications aimed to unite all legal practice systems.

== Current system ==
Spain reformed the accessing the legal profession with the Law 34/2006, of 30 October, on Admission to legal practice. Later to apply and develop this Law, the Government of Spain passed the Royal Decree 775/2011, of 3 June, which approves the application regulations for the Law 34/2006.

In 2014 the Government of Spain passed the Royal Decree 150/2014, of March 7, which approves the additional rules of execution and application of the Law 34/2006.

In order to obtain the Lawyer's Professional Title, it is now necessary to have the following (in total, six years):

- Bachelor's Degree in Law
- Master's Degree in Legal Practice
- Legal Internship
- Bar Examination

Those six years of training are basic training to be a lawyer. After that, lawyers who want to specialize in a certain law must take an LLM (civil, commercial, criminal...).

== Bachelor's degree in Law ==
The Bachelor's Degree in Law (in Spain) is the academic degree conferred on those who have successfully completed a law study process at a university or institution of higher studies. Not to be confused with the (old) licenciate degree in law.

It is important to differentiate between two types of degrees in law (licenciate/bachelor's): the one previous to the Bologna Process and the later one. The one previous to the Bologna Process (licenciate degree in law) was composed of 5 years (it itself included the specialization and there was no legal internship). The current one consists of 4 years (bachelor's degree).

== Master's degree in Legal Practice ==
The master's degree in Legal Practice is a postgraduate academic degree, pursued by those holding a bachelor's degree in Law and it is the basic professional degree for admission into legal practice. It is a type or a subclass of a Master of Laws, but they should not be confused, they are not the same. This is a compulsory master's degree for admission to legal practice. It is not for specialization, it is for becoming a lawyer. After that, lawyers who want to specialize must take an LLM.

In Spain this master has different names according to the university that offers it, including: Master's Degree in Access to the Legal Profession, Master's Degree in Access to Law, Master's Degree in Legal Practice, Master's Degree in Advocacy... It does not have a unified official name, but the content is the same. For example, Garrigues (law firm) together with University of Nebrija offers it and it is called "Master's Degree in Legal Practice".

The master's degree in legal practice is made up of one or two years depending on the university that offers it and consists of 90 ECTS credits.

This master's degree it is not for specialization, it is for becoming a lawyer and for that reason sometimes it is offered together with a LLM, in a double máster's degree program (master's degree in legal practice + LLM of specialization).

== Legal internship ==
As to the legal internship, according to article 17 of the Royal Decree 775/2011, of 3 June, which approves the rules set by the LAC, it will involve a minimum of 30 ECTS credits, which means a minimum of 750 hours (6 months).

== Bar Examination ==
The (general) Bar Examination is a State compulsory examination for the entire national territory (unified exam). It is convened annually and administered by the Government of Spain.

According to article 17 of the Royal Decree 775/2011, of 3 June, the exam is written and consists of two parts that are done on the same day. The first exercise consists of an objective test of multiple answers and the second exercise of the evaluation will consist of solving a practical case previously chosen by the applicant among several alternatives.

The evaluation test has a total duration of 4 hours and consists of:

- 50 questions on «Common subjects in the practice of the legal profession».
- 25 questions on «Specific subjects» according to the legal specialty (civil and commercial, criminal, administrative and labor)
- In addition, the questionnaire includes six reservation questions for the section «Common subjects exercising the legal profession» and two for each legal specialty of the section «Specific subjects».

The result of the State Test is pass or fail.

== Lawyer's Professional Title ==
The Lawyer's Professional Title is the professional license in Spain to practice law, which allows legal practice in Spain and the EU. It was created in 2006 by the Law 34/2006. Until this law came into force, the "title" or "license" of Lawyer did not exist as such in Spain.

Once you have passed the State Examination for Access to the Legal Profession, the Ministry of Justice of the Spanish Government gives you the Lawyer's Professional Title and with it you can join a Bar Association and practice law.

Article 1. Object and purpose of the law.

1. Esta ley tiene por objeto regular las condiciones de obtención del título profesional de abogado y el título profesional de procurador de los tribunales, como colaboradores en el ejercicio del derecho fundamental a la tutela judicial efectiva, con el fin de garantizar el acceso de los ciudadanos a un asesoramiento, defensa jurídica y representación técnica de calidad.

2. La obtención del título profesional de abogado en la forma determinada por esta ley es necesaria para el desempeño de la asistencia letrada en aquellos procesos judiciales y extrajudiciales en los que la normativa vigente imponga o faculte la intervención de abogado, y, en todo caso, para prestar asistencia letrada o asesoramiento en Derecho utilizando la denominación de abogado; todo ello sin perjuicio del cumplimiento de cualesquiera otros requisitos exigidos por la normativa vigente para el ejercicio de la abogacía.

4. La obtención de los títulos profesionales de abogado o procurador será requisito imprescindible para la colegiación en los correspondientes colegios profesionales.

— Law 34/2006, of 30 October

In this way, the aforementioned Law created this professional title that before 2006 did not exist in Spain as such, and it established that it is the basic requirement to be able to join a Bar Association and practice law.

== Joining a Bar Association ==
In Spain it is mandatory to join a Bar Association to practice law and the requirement to join a Bar Association is to be in possession of the Lawyer's Professional Title.

The incorporation into a single Bar Association is sufficient to practice throughout the national territory, being that Bar Association the sole professional domicile or principal domicile of the lawyer.

== Legal framework ==
- Law 34/2006, of 30 October, on Admission to legal practice
- Royal Decree 775/2011, of 3 June, which approves the application regulations for the Law 34/2006
- Royal Decree 150/2014, of March 7, which approves the additional rules of execution and application of the Law 34/2006
- Resolution of September 7, 2012, of the General Directorate of Justice, by which the Bar Examination is summoned for admission to legal practice in Spain
