= Javier Izquierdo =

Spanish politician (born 1970)

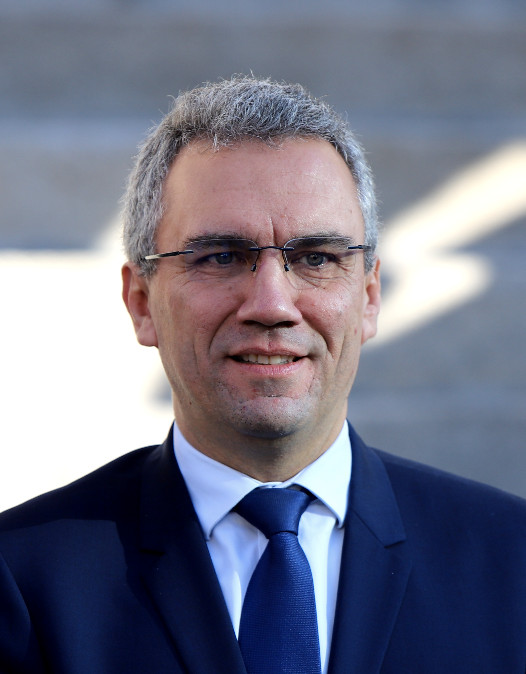
- Izquierdo in 2020

Member of the Senate
- Incumbent
- Assumed office 23 July 2023
- Constituency: Valladolid

Member of the Congress of Deputies
- In office 21 May 2019 – 11 February 2020
- Succeeded by: Julio del Valle de Íscar
- Constituency: Valladolid

Personal details
- Born: 17 February 1970 (age 56)
- Party: Spanish Socialist Workers' Party

José Javier Izquierdo Roncero (born 17 February 1970) is a Spanish politician serving as a member of the Senate since 2023. From 2019 to 2020, he was a member of the Congress of Deputies.
