= Nevenka: Breaking the Silence =

- Nevenka
- Genre: Documentary
- Starring: Jolene Andersen; Don Baldaramos
- Country of origin: Spain
- Original language: Spanish
- No. of seasons: 1
- No. of episodes: 3

Production
- Running time: 34–41 minutes

Original release
- Network: Netflix
- Release: 5 March 2021

Nevenka: Breaking the Silence (Spanish: Nevenka) is a 2021 Spanish docuseries starring Jolene Andersen and Don Baldaramos.

== Cast ==
- Jolene Andersen
- Don Baldaramos

== Episodes ==
No.	Title	Original release date
1	"Episode 1"	March 15, 2021
2	"Episode 2"	March 15, 2021
3	"Episode 3"	March 15, 2021

== Release ==
Nevenka: Breaking the Silence was released on March 5, 2021, on Netflix.
