= José Ángel González Jiménez =

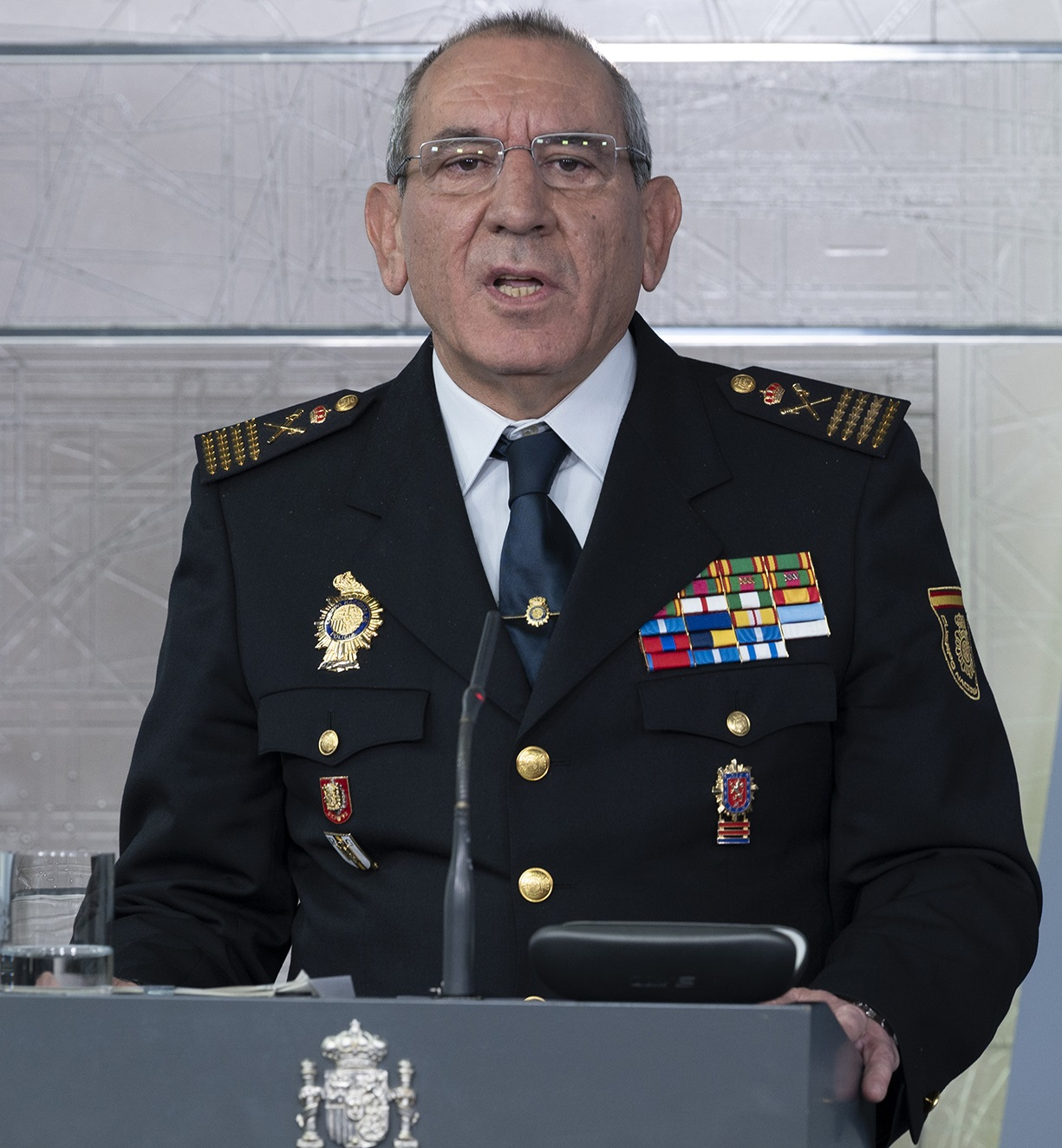
- Commissioner González in 2020
- Born: December, 19, 1959 (66 years old); La Rioja, Spain
- Allegiance: Spain
- Branch: National Police Corps
- Service years: 1984-2026

José Ángel González Jiménez (December 19, 1959) is a Spanish police commissioner, deputy director of operations the National Police Corps from October 2018 until his resignation in February 2026, after being investigated by a Court of Violence against Women for an alleged sexual assault committed against a subordinate (see DAO affair for further information).

== Life ==
Born in La Rioja, Spain 1959, he entered the National Police in 1984 after completing military training at the General Military Academy in Zaragoza, where he reached the rank of lieutenant before moving into the Police Intervention Units González was due to retire at the end of 2024. But the Government kept him in his position through a modification of the Police Personnel Regime included in the decree of aid for the DANA storm, arguing that in an emergency situation such as the disaster in the Valencian Community on October 29, 2024, "it would be highly dysfunctional to proceed with the replacement of the person who, at the head of the Operational Deputy Directorate, is directing and coordinating on the ground the operational functions of the National Police officers."

In 2002 he was promoted to commissioner and assigned to the Immigration and Borders Brigade in Alicante.

in 2005 he was appointed provincial commissioner of Valladolid, a position he held for nine years.

In March 2014 he was appointed chief of police of Melilla. a position he held until April 2017, when he was appointed chief of police of Aragon.

In October 2018, he was transferred to the central services of the General Directorate of the Police after being appointed Deputy Director of Operations of the National Police Corps by, Fernando Grande-Marlaska. During his time as second-in-command of the National Police, he was part of the Operational Coordination Center (CECOR), which aimed to guarantee public safety after the "procés" verdict.

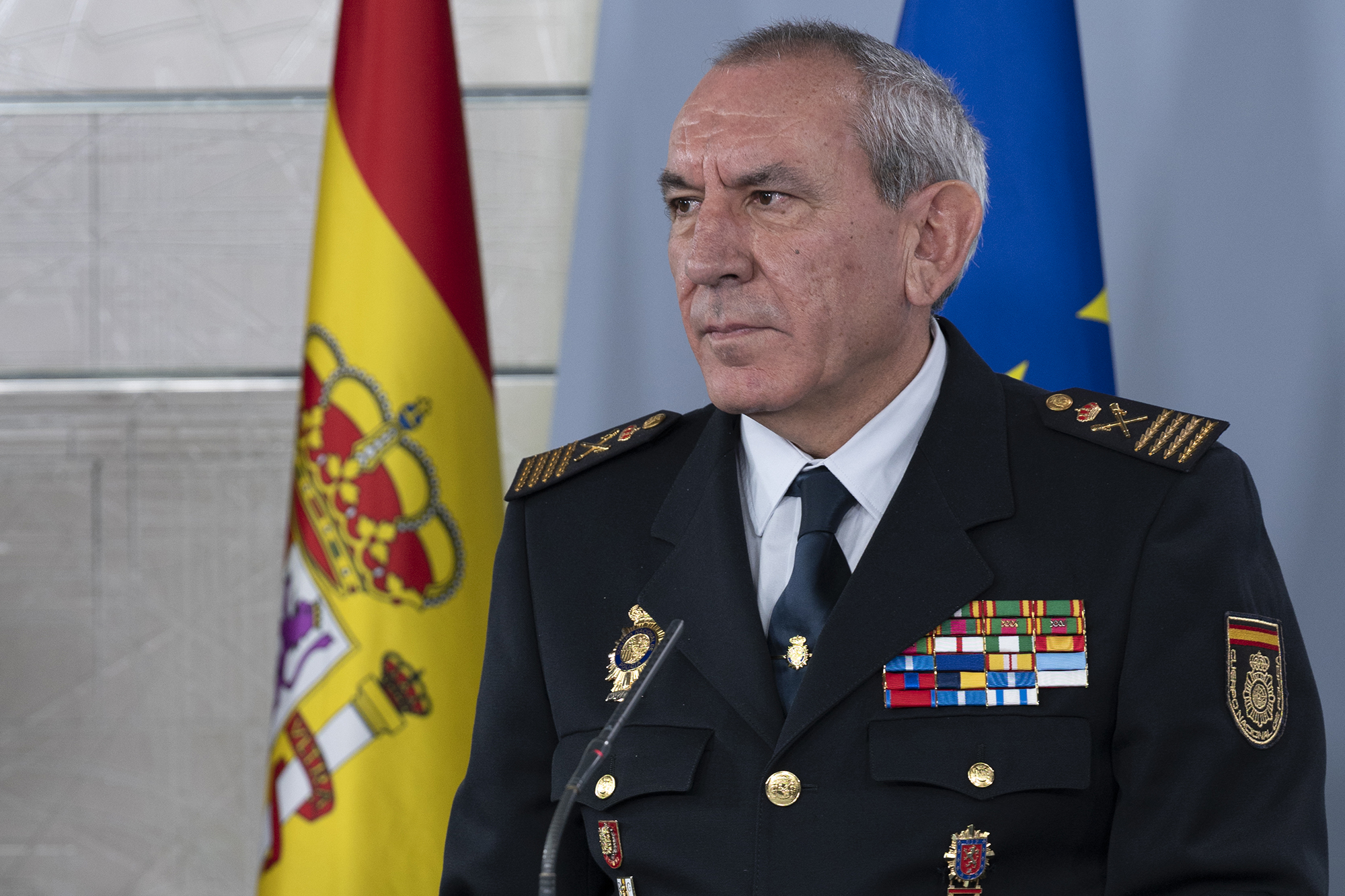
González during a press conference on March 30, 2020.

In 2023 he was awarded the Cross of Military Merit. The next year, he was awarded the Order of Merit of the Civil Guard.

== Sexual assault allegations ==
His career came to an end after, resigning on February 17 2026, after a female police inspector filed a complaint accusing him of sexual assault. The case triggered political turmoil, with the inspector’s lawyer stating that she was devastated after her identity was leaked online. The allegations became public on February 18, 2026, prompting González Jiménez to resign from his position as DAO. The scandal unfolded at a moment when the Spanish government was already under scrutiny, and the opposition accused officials of attempting to conceal the case. Reporting described the situation as a major crisis within the National Police and a damaging episode for Prime Minister Pedro Sánchez’s administration. The complaint, includes an audio recording. His resignation took effect on February 19th. Gemma Barroso will temporarily fill his position. Óscar San Juan, was suspended from his position after being accused of participating in an intimidation campaign against the victim to prevent her from reporting the incident. On February 23rd, a second woman accused Jose of harassment, contacting the lawyer of the inspector who filed the sexual assault complaint against González to inform him that she, too, had suffered harassment. Sources consulted suggest it does not involve sexual assault.
