= Payoyo =

Payoyo may refer to:

- The demonym for Villaluenga del Rosario, Spain
- Payoyo cheese
- Payoya goat
