= Von Mühlenen =

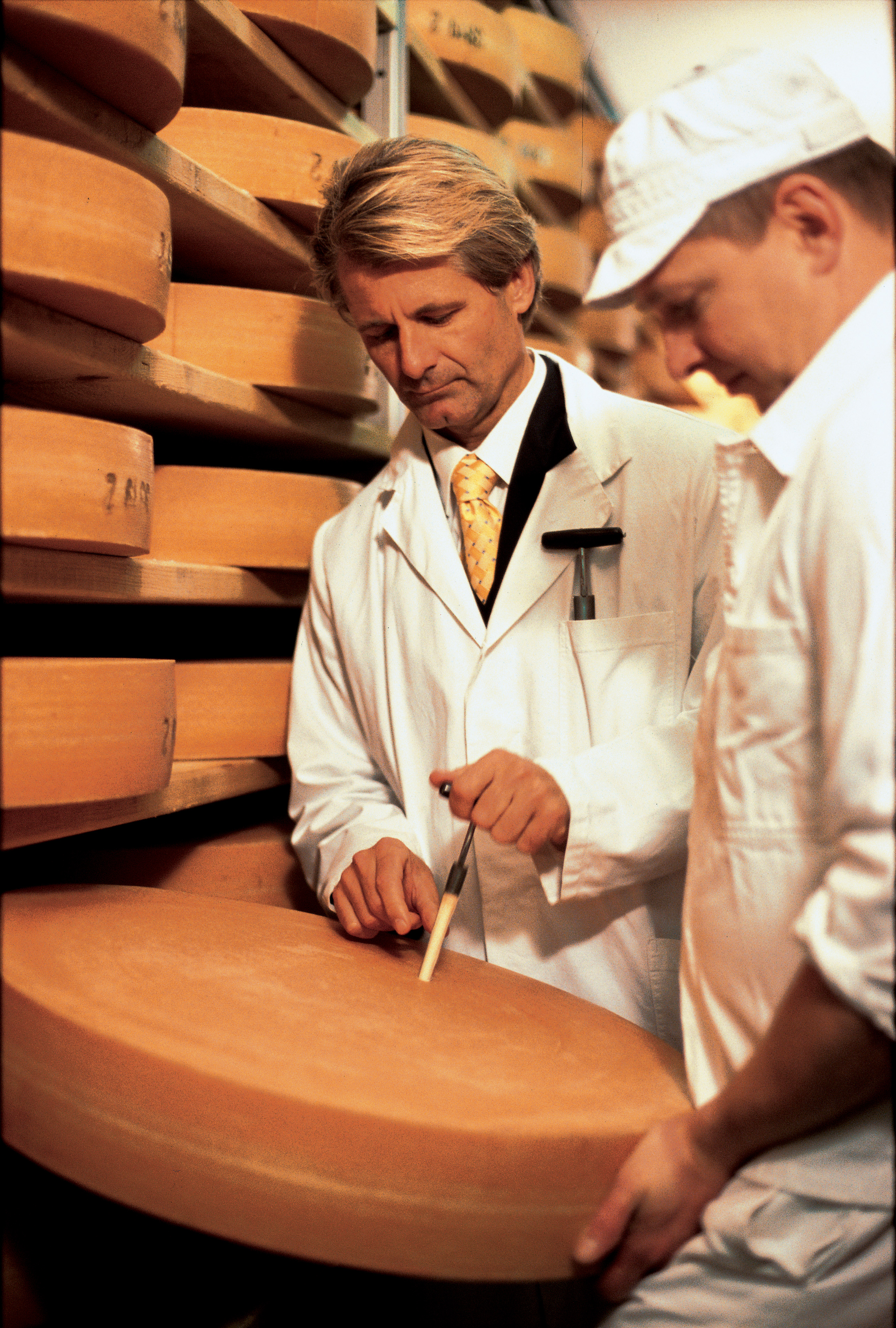
Affineur Walo von Mühlenen checking a cheese.

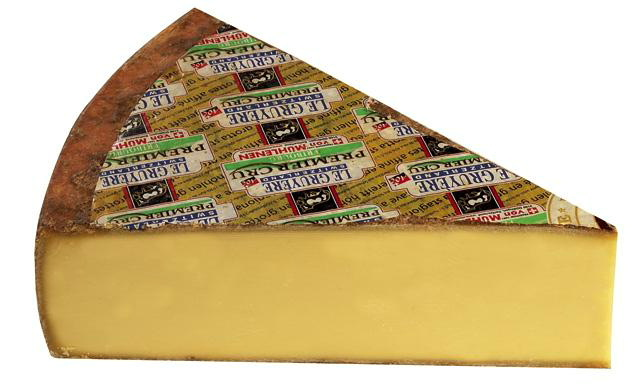
A Le Gruyère Premier Cru from Von Mühlenen.

Von Mühlenen is a Swiss cheese brand from Düdingen (canton of Fribourg).

It has over fifteen dairies making various cheeses sold under the Von Mühlenen brand.

It has won the main prize in World Cheese Awards several times: In 1992 and 2005 for Le Gruyère Premier Cru, in 2002 and 2015 for Le Gruyère AOC Reserve.

== History ==
- 1864: Established by Andreas von Mühlenen (1845–) in Bern
- 1910: Continued by his son Ernst von Mühlenen (–1934), also joined by his brother Eugen von Mühlenen.
- 1934: Continued by his son Walo von Mühlenen (–1972)
- c. 1970: Moved to Fribourg
- 1972: Continued by his son Roger von Mühlenen.
- 1996: Continued by his son Walo von Mühlenen
- 2006: Sold to the Cremo SA dairy of Villars-sur-Glâne.

== Affineur Walo of Mühlenen ==
Since the 2006 sale, the von Mühlenens established a new brand Affineur Walo of Mühlenen in 2011, located in nearby Granges Paccot. In the 2015 World Cheese Awards Walo was awarded twelve medals for various cheeses, among these for "Super Gold" the spicy semi-hard Stärnächäs and Armailii de la Gruyère.
