= Alfonso Moscoso =

Spanish politician (born 1972)

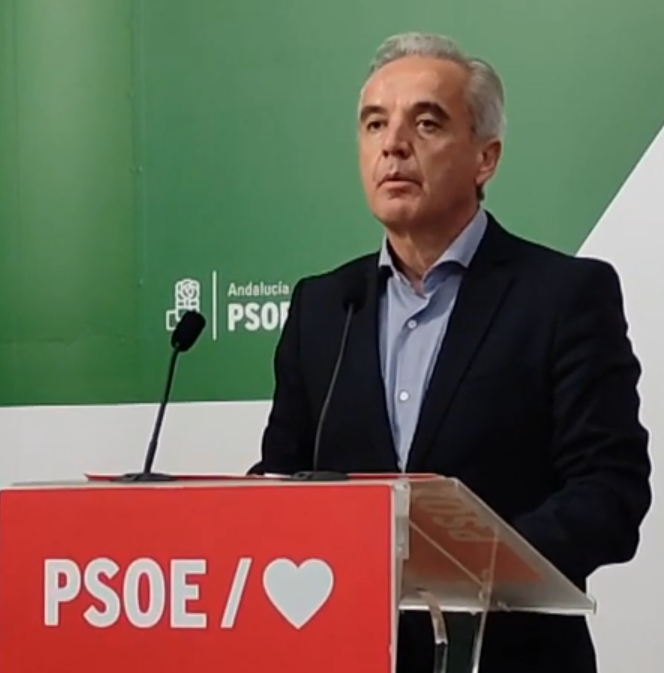
- Moscoso in 2025

Member of the Senate
- Incumbent
- Assumed office 28 April 2019
- Constituency: Cádiz

Personal details
- Born: 28 June 1972 (age 54)
- Party: Spanish Socialist Workers' Party

Alfonso Carlos Moscoso González (born 28 June 1972) is a Spanish politician serving as a member of the Senate since 2019. He has served as mayor of Villaluenga del Rosario since 1999.
