= Kraftkar =

Norwegian blue cheese

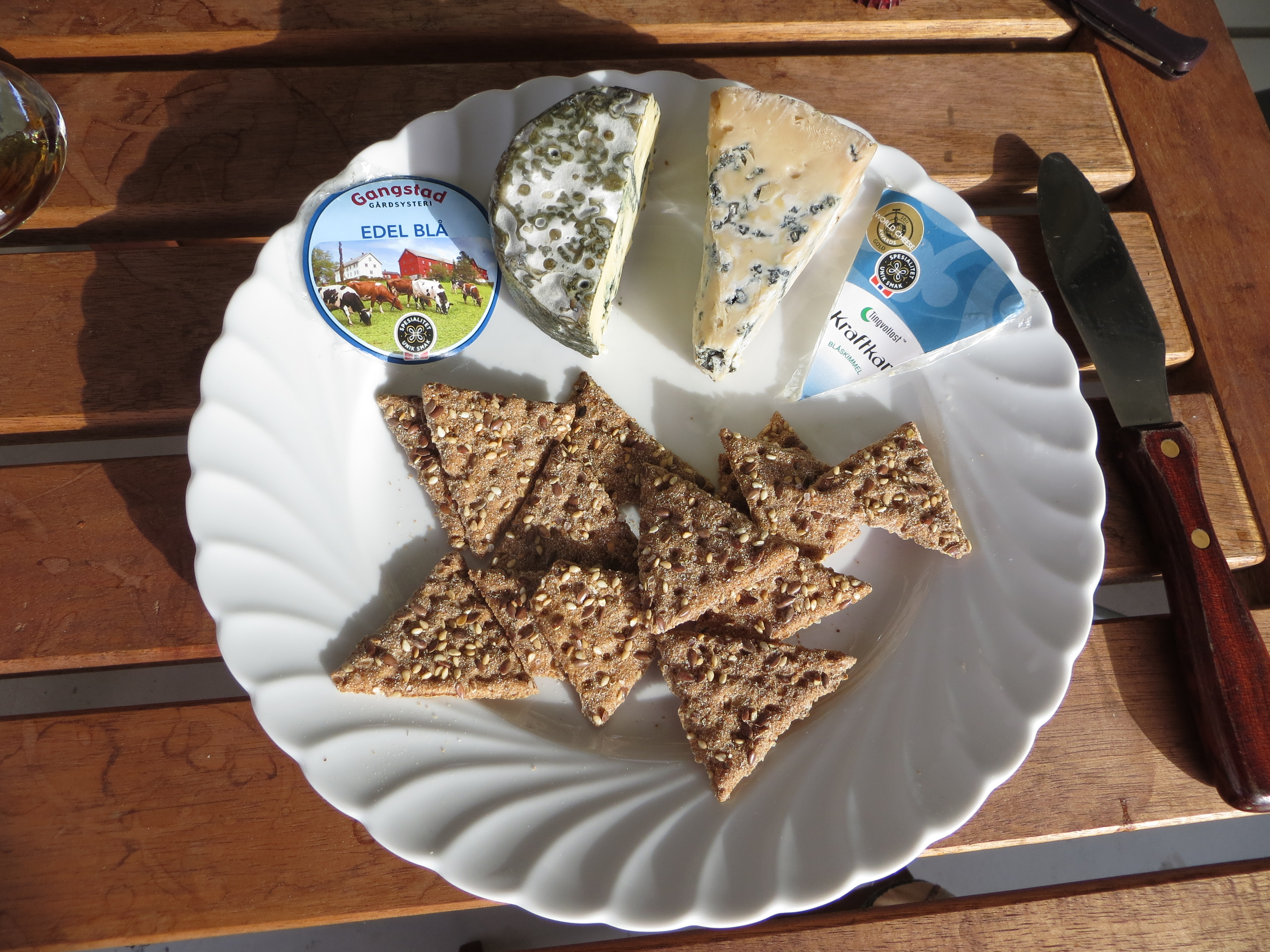
- Country of origin: Norway
- Region, town: Tingvoll Municipality
- Region: Nordmøre
- Source of milk: Cows
- Pasteurized: Yes
- Fat content: 35%
- Protein content: 23%
- Dimensions: 18 cm (diameter)
- Weight: 1.8 kg
- Aging time: 6 months

Kraftkar is a Norwegian blue cheese originating from Tingvoll Municipality, Nordmøre. It is made from unskimmed cow's milk and cream, with injected culture of the mold Penicillium roqueforti.

The name Kraftkar (lit. 'strongman') relates to the legendary farmhand Tore Nordbø and his supernatural strength and size.

== History ==
Produced by the cheesemaker Tingvollost, Kraftkar was first introduced in 2004.

== Awards ==
Kraftkar was awarded gold medal for blue cheese at the World Cheese Awards in 2011, gold medal at the International Cheese Awards in 2013, and silver medal at the 2015 World Cheese Awards. At the 2016 World Cheese Awards in San Sebastián, Kraftkar was selected "World Champion" (all categories), among more than 3,000 participating cheeses from 35 countries.

== See also ==
- List of cheeses
- Danish blue cheese varieties:
  - Danablu
  - Castello Blue
  - Saga
