= Payoyo cheese =

Spanish goat and sheep cheese

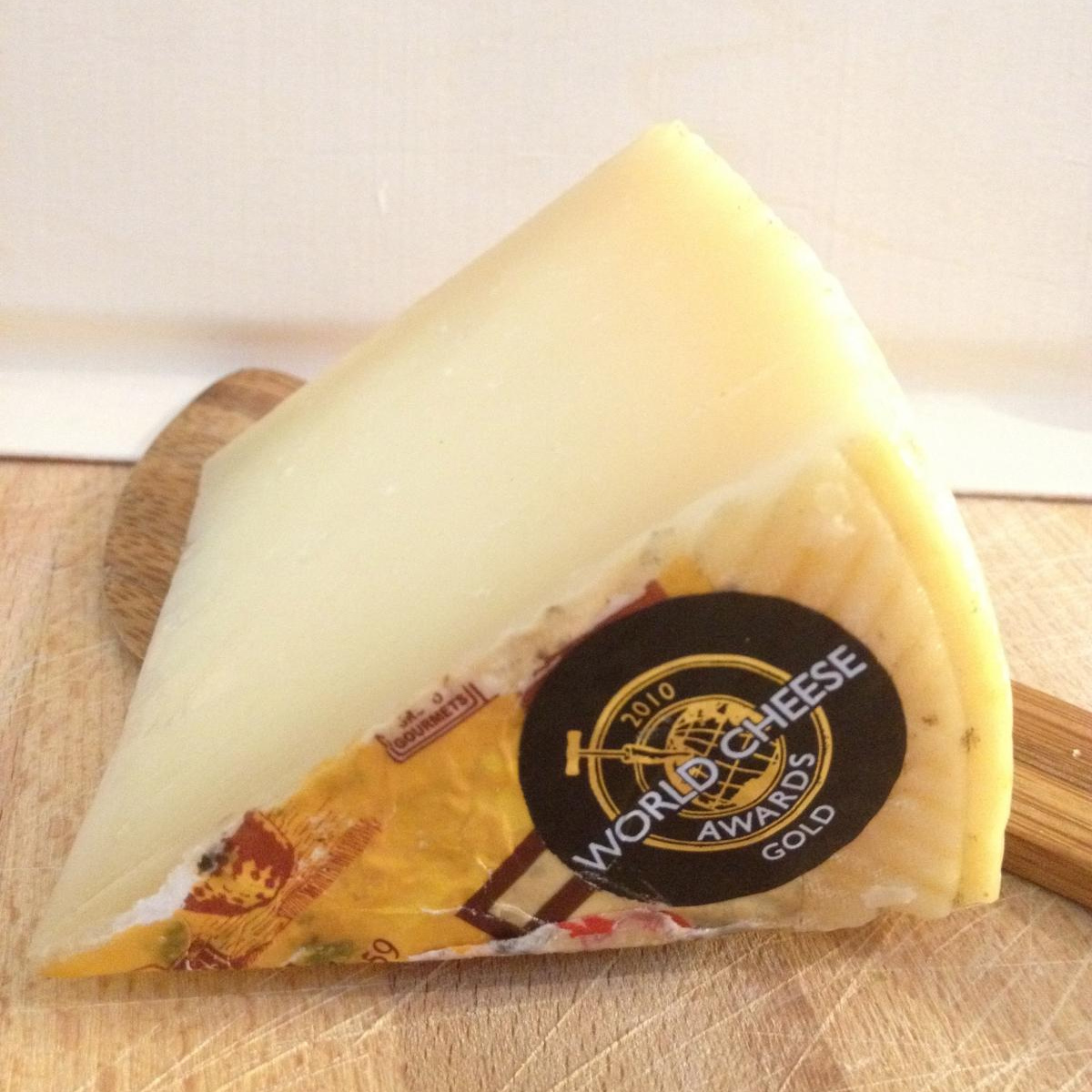
- Other names: Queso de cabra payoya
- Country of origin: Spain
- Region: Sierra de Grazalema
- Source of milk: Goats & ewes
- Texture: Firm
- Dimensions: height 10 cm (3.9 in) diameter 17 cm (6.7 in)
- Weight: 2.5 kg (5.5 lb)
- Aging time: 3-6 months
- Certification: pending

Payoyo cheese (Spanish: queso payoyo or queso de cabra payoya) is a type of cheese made from the milk of Payoya goats and Merina grazalemeña sheep in Villaluenga del Rosario and other areas of the Sierra de Grazalema, Spain. It began production in 1997 and has become a staple of Spanish delicatessen. The term payoyo is the demonym for Villaluenga del Rosario.

In 1986, ten years before the name "payoyo cheese" was popularized by Queso Payoyo SL, production of the same type of cheese had begun in the nearby village of El Bosque by the company El Bosqueño. In 2016, El Bosqueño's payoyo cheese finished third at the World Cheese Awards. In 2018, La Pastora de Grazalema, another brand of payoyo cheese, was ranked no. 1 in the category "best mixed-milk cheeses" at the Salón de Gourmets, IFEMA, Madrid.

== Name ==
The term payoyo is the demonym for Villaluenga del Rosario, the smallest and highest municipality in the province of Cádiz. The name derives from payo, a Romani word used to describe non-Romani people. Villaluenga's inhabitants, who worked agricultural land rather than following a nomadic lifestyle, referred to themselves as payos when asked if they belonged to the Romani ethnic group. Over time, the local demonym evolved to payoyos, which was subsequently adopted as the name for the native Payoya goat breed raised in the area.

== Distribution ==
Payoyo cheeses are distributed throughout Spain and exported to countries such as the United Kingdom, the United States, South Korea, Japan, Italy, Sweden and Belgium. They have received several prestigious both national and international awards.
