= Tingvollost =

Norwegian cheesemaker

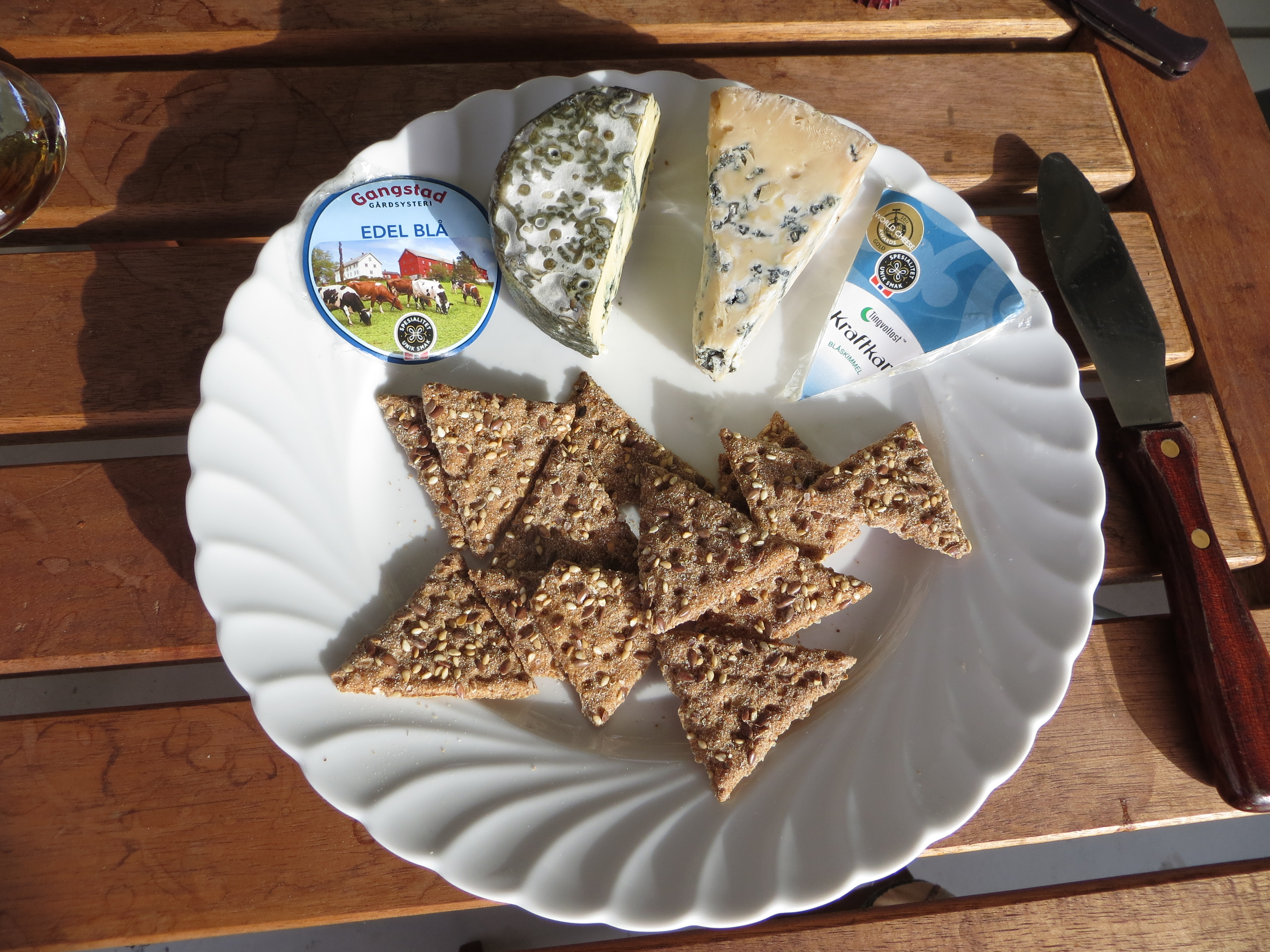
Tingvollost Kraftkar (upper right), with Edel Bla another cheese, upper left.

Tingvollost (established in 2003) is a Norwegian cheesemaker in Tingvoll Municipality, making blue cheese and white mold cheeses from cow's milk. Annual production in 2014 was 21 tons of cheese based on 200 000 liters milk.

Perhaps best known is the Kraftkar blue cheese that became World Champion in World Cheese Awards 2016. It first won the national championship in 2009 as well as medaled in the Nordic Cheese Competition in Denmark. It won gold in World Cheese Awards 2011, in which year they also brought home the national and nordic gold. The next year they again won Nordic, beating the Svedjan and Kastrup. In 2013 the Vismann took silver (a milder version of Kraftkar). During World Cheese Awards 2014 in London, they won bronze with the Edel frue (soft white) and Mild mester (semi-hard white). Mild Mester was in 2015 made a "Super Gold" and among 62 cheeses nominated to win World Cheese Awards 2015 in Birmingham, Edel frue and Vismann, taking bronze, while Kraftkar won silver.

Kraftkar was elected as World Champion in World Cheese Awards 2016, held in San Sebastián, competing with 3,021 cheeses from 31 countries.

== Background ==
It was founded in 2003 by the Waagen family in conjunction with the Saghaug Gård, a farm dating from the 1300s. Production manager Egil Smith-Meyer, chief executive officer is Kristin Waagen, daughter of farmer Gunnar Waagen and senior cheese maker Solvår Waagen who describes production as handmade (no machinery).

The startup was partially due to minister of agriculture Lars Sponheim in 2003 allowing milk farmers to make cheese from their own milk (not from the TINE quota).

== See also ==
- List of cheesemakers
- World Cheese Awards
