= Gruyère =

Swiss medium-hard Alpine cheese

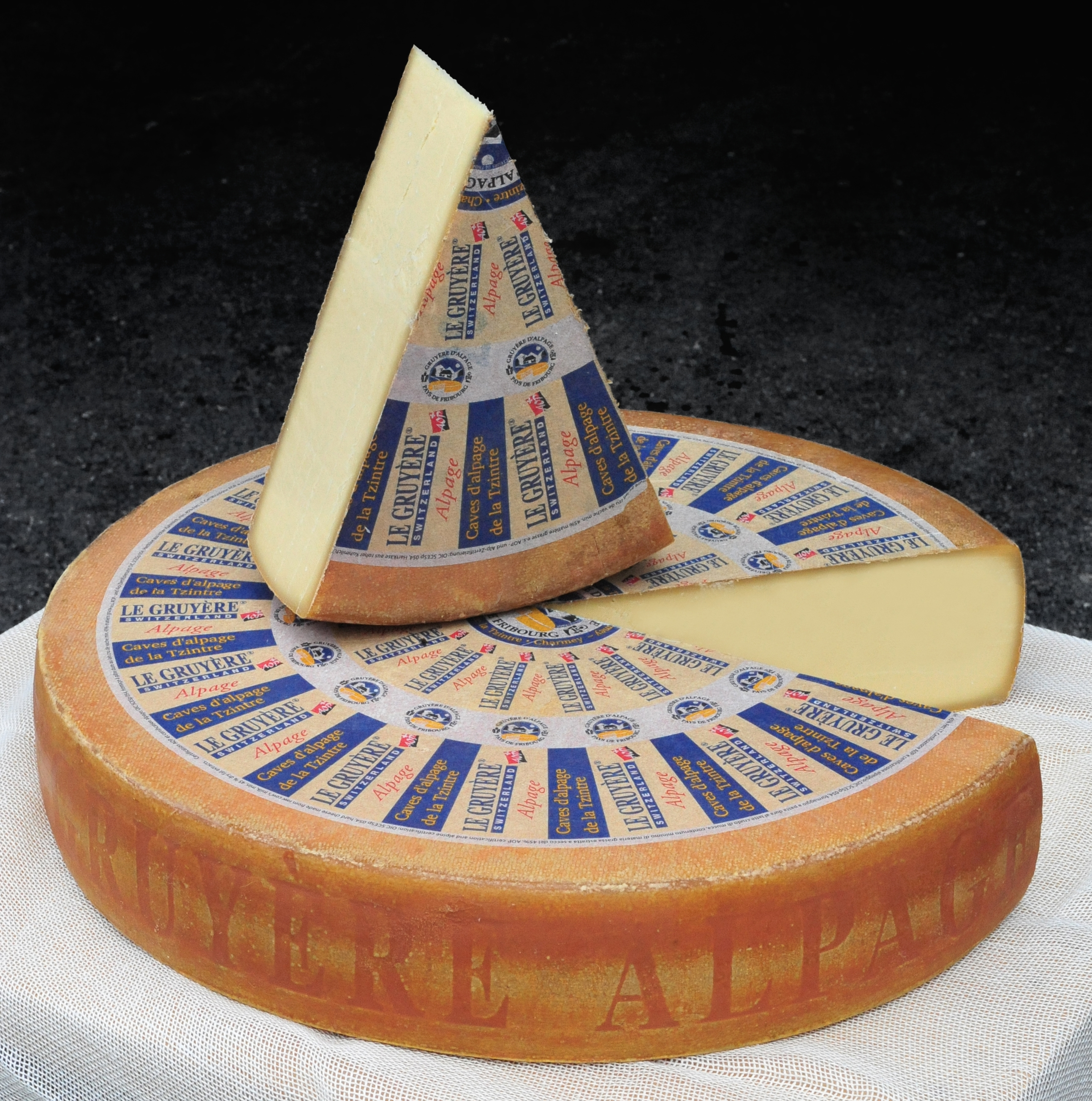
- Country of origin: Switzerland
- Region: Canton of Fribourg
- Town: Gruyères
- Source of milk: Cows
- Pasteurized: No
- Aging time: 5–12 months (typical)
- Certification: Swiss AOC 2001–2013; Swiss AOP since 2013

Gruyère (UK: /ˈɡruːjɛə, ˈɡriːjɛə/, US: /ɡruːˈjɛər, ɡriˈ-/, French: [ɡʁɥijɛʁ]; German: Greyerzer, Italian: Groviera, Arpitan: Gruviére suisso) is a hard Swiss cheese that originated in the Fribourg, Vaud, Neuchâtel, Jura, and Bern cantons in Switzerland. It is named after the town of Gruyères in Fribourg. In 2001, Gruyère gained the appellation d'origine contrôlée (AOC), which became the appellation d'origine protégée (AOP) as of 2013.

Gruyère is classified as a Swiss-type or Alpine cheese and is sweet but slightly salty, with a flavour that varies widely with age. It is often described as creamy and nutty when young, becoming more assertive, earthy, and complex as it matures. When fully aged (five months to a year), it tends to have small cracks that impart a slightly grainy texture. Unlike Emmental, with which it is often confused, modern Gruyère has few if any eyes, the small holes that can develop in Swiss-type cheese during aging; although in the 19th century, this was not always the case. It is the most popular Swiss cheese in Switzerland and in most of Europe.

== Uses ==
Gruyère is used in many ways in countless dishes. It is considered a good cheese for baking, because of its distinctive but not overpowering taste. For example, in quiche, Gruyère adds savoriness without overshadowing the other ingredients. It is a good melting cheese, particularly suited for fondues, along with Vacherin Fribourgeois and Emmental. It is also traditionally used in French onion soup, as well as in the croque-monsieur, a classic French toasted ham and cheese sandwich. Gruyère is also used in chicken and veal cordon bleu. It is a fine table cheese, and when grated, it is often used with salads and pastas. It is used, grated, atop le tourin, a garlic soup from France served on dried bread. White wines, such as Riesling, pair well with Gruyère. Sparkling cider and Bock beer are also beverage affinities.

== Production ==
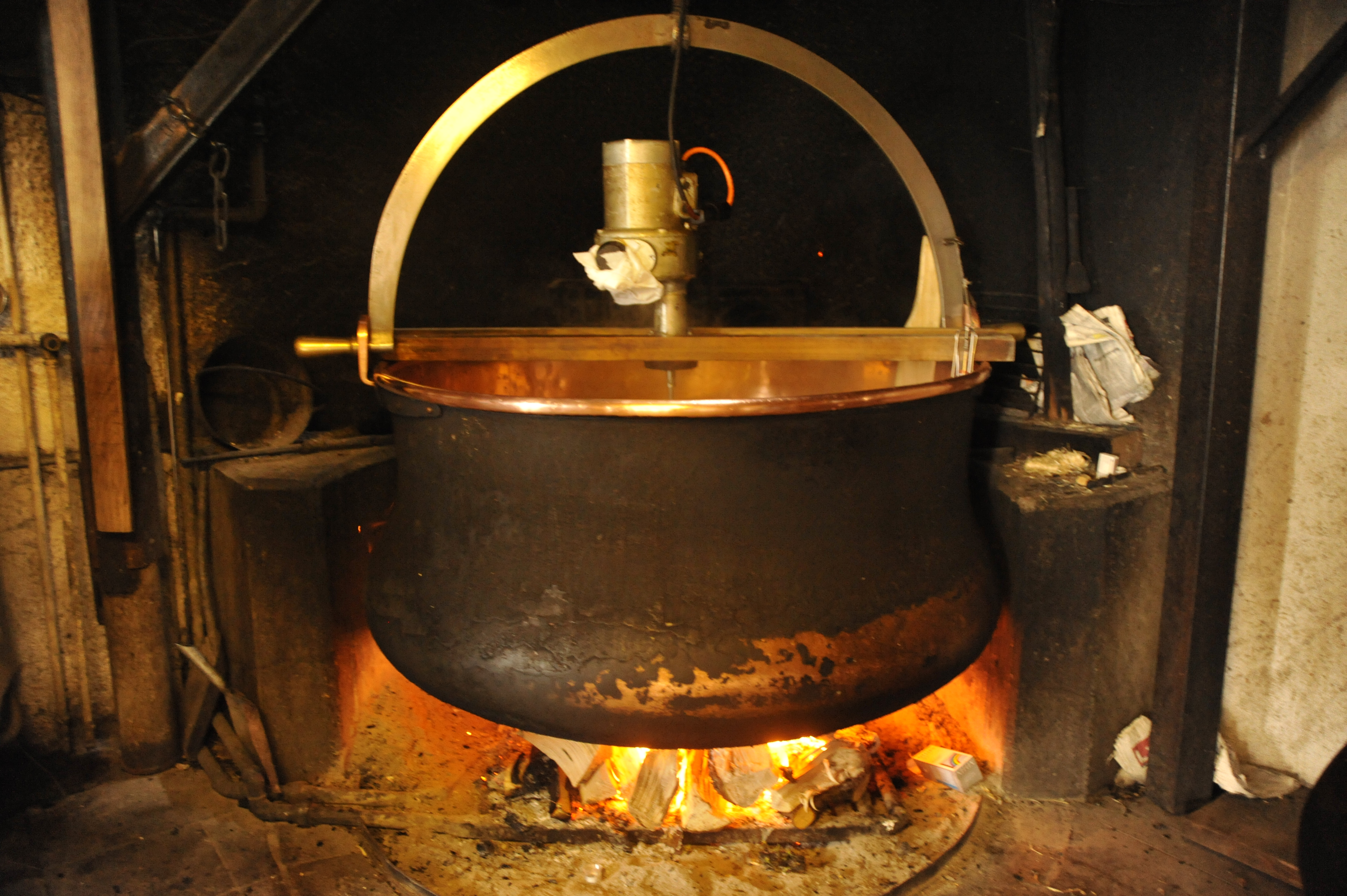
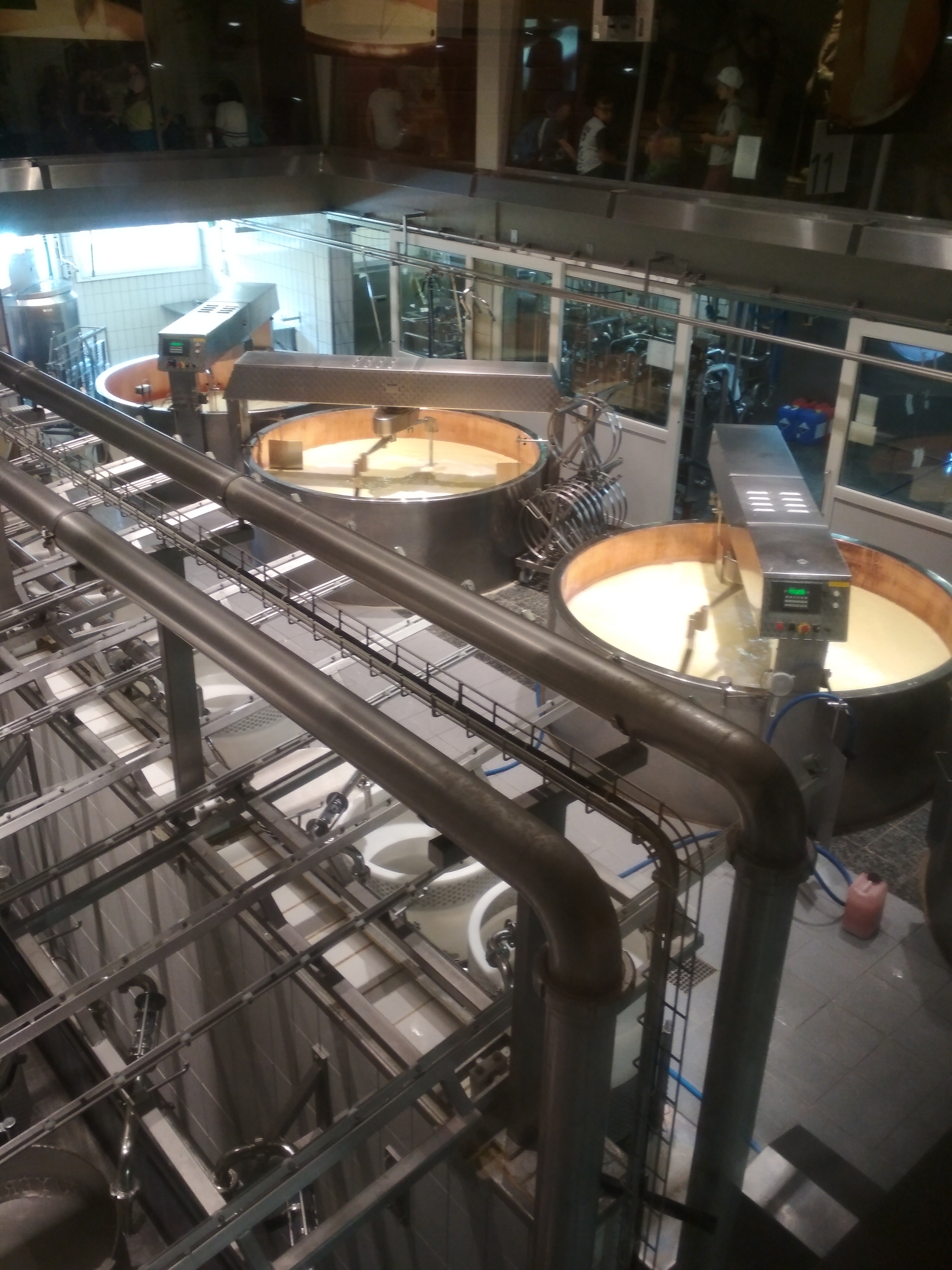
Traditional production of Gruyère (left) vs industrial production (right)

To make Gruyère, raw cow's milk is heated to 34 °C (93 °F) in a copper vat, and then curdled by the addition of liquid rennet. The curd is cut up into pea-sized pieces and stirred, releasing whey. The curd is cooked at 43 °C (109 °F), and raised quickly to 54 °C (129 °F).

The whey is strained, and the curds placed into moulds to be pressed. After salting in brine and smearing with bacteria, the cheese is ripened for two months at room temperature, generally on wooden boards, turning every couple of days to ensure even moisture distribution. Gruyère can be cured for 3 to 10 months, with long curing producing a cheese of intense flavour.

Sérac, a whey cheese, is a historical by-product of the manufacture of Gruyère.

=== Natural holes in cheese ===
The presence of holes in cheeses such as Gruyère and Emmental was long thought to be due to bacterial activity in the mass of the cheese. In the 21st century, researchers discovered that it also was due in part to microscopic hay dust that got into the milk during milking. Bacteria formed around the dust particles and produced gases, which caused the characteristic holes. In addition to their traditionally favoured appearance, the holes, if not too small, have the beneficial effect of preventing gaps and cracks in the block of cheese from forming. Some suggestion in the past indicated a variable effect; Emmental cheese made from summer milk had smaller holes than winter cheese—the cows ate hay in winter, but grass with less dust in summer. Modern production techniques and milking machines are less susceptible to hay dust, and indeed 21st-century Swiss cheeses have fewer and smaller holes.

Holes can be restored to their former size and prevalence by adding hay flower powder to the milk; this is done in Germany and France, but such additives are forbidden in Swiss cheeses.

=== Affinage ===
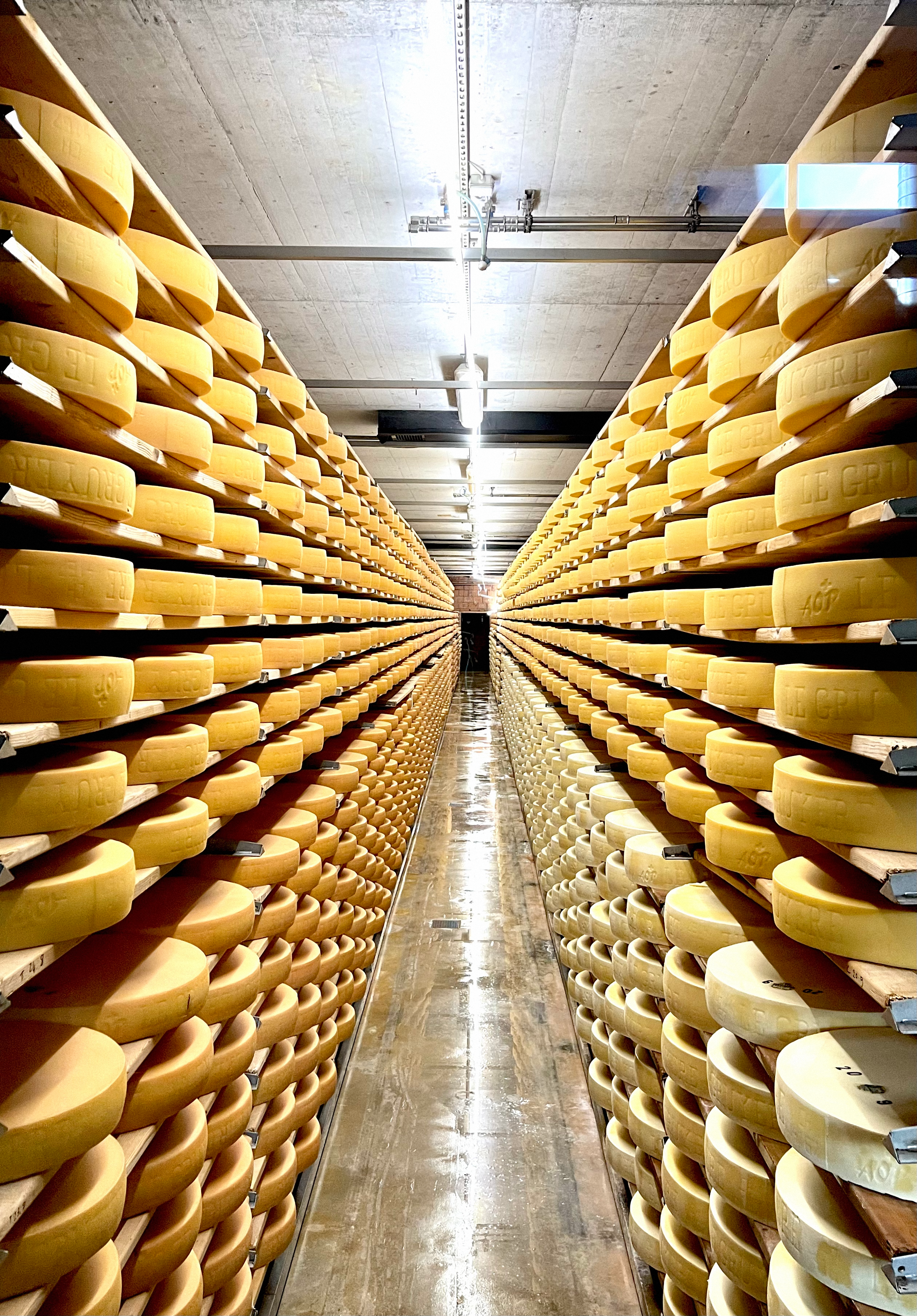
The affinage cellar in the Maison du Gruyère, in Gruyères

An important and the longest part of the production of Gruyère in Switzerland is the affinage (French for "maturation").

According to the AOC, the cellars to mature a Swiss Gruyère must have a climate close to a natural cave. This means that the humidity should be between 94 and 98%. If the humidity is lower, the cheese dries out. If the humidity is too high, the cheese does not mature and becomes smeary and gluey. The temperature of the caves should be between 13 and 14 °C (55 and 57 °F). This relatively high temperature is required for excellent-quality cheese. Lower-quality cheeses result from temperatures between 10 and 12 °C (50 and 54 °F). The lower the temperature, the less the cheese matures, resulting in a harder and more crumbly texture.

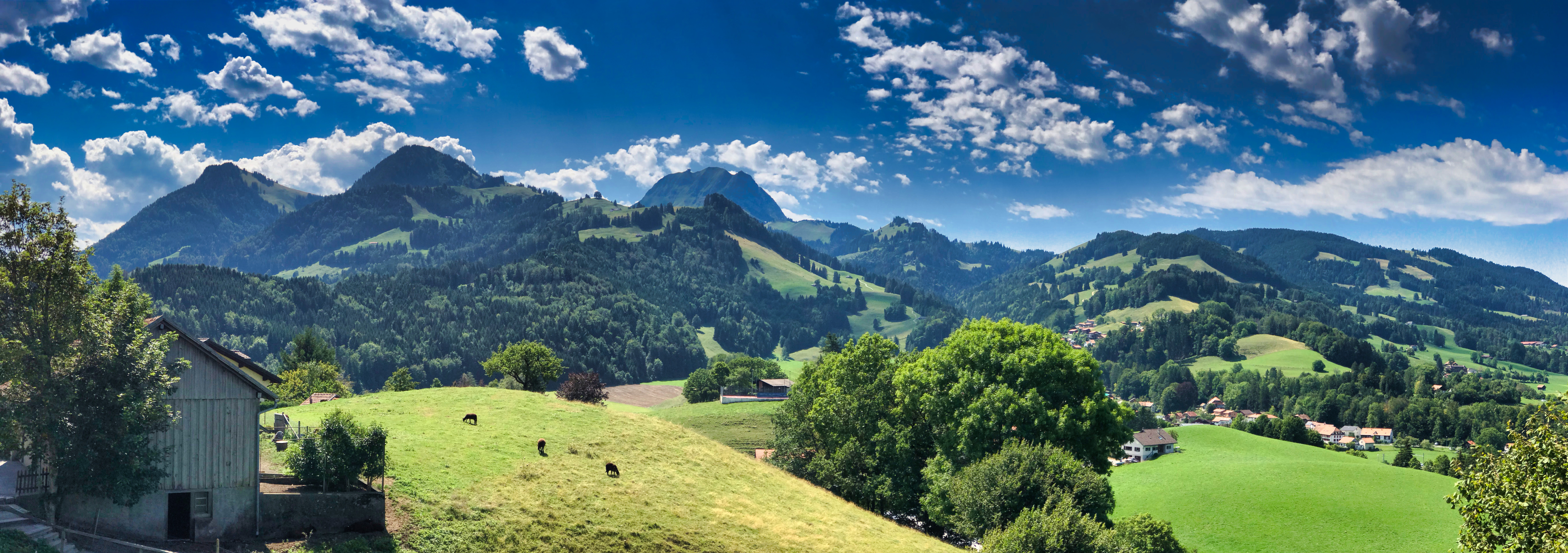
The landscape of the region of Gruyères, marked by milk economy

== Legal protection ==
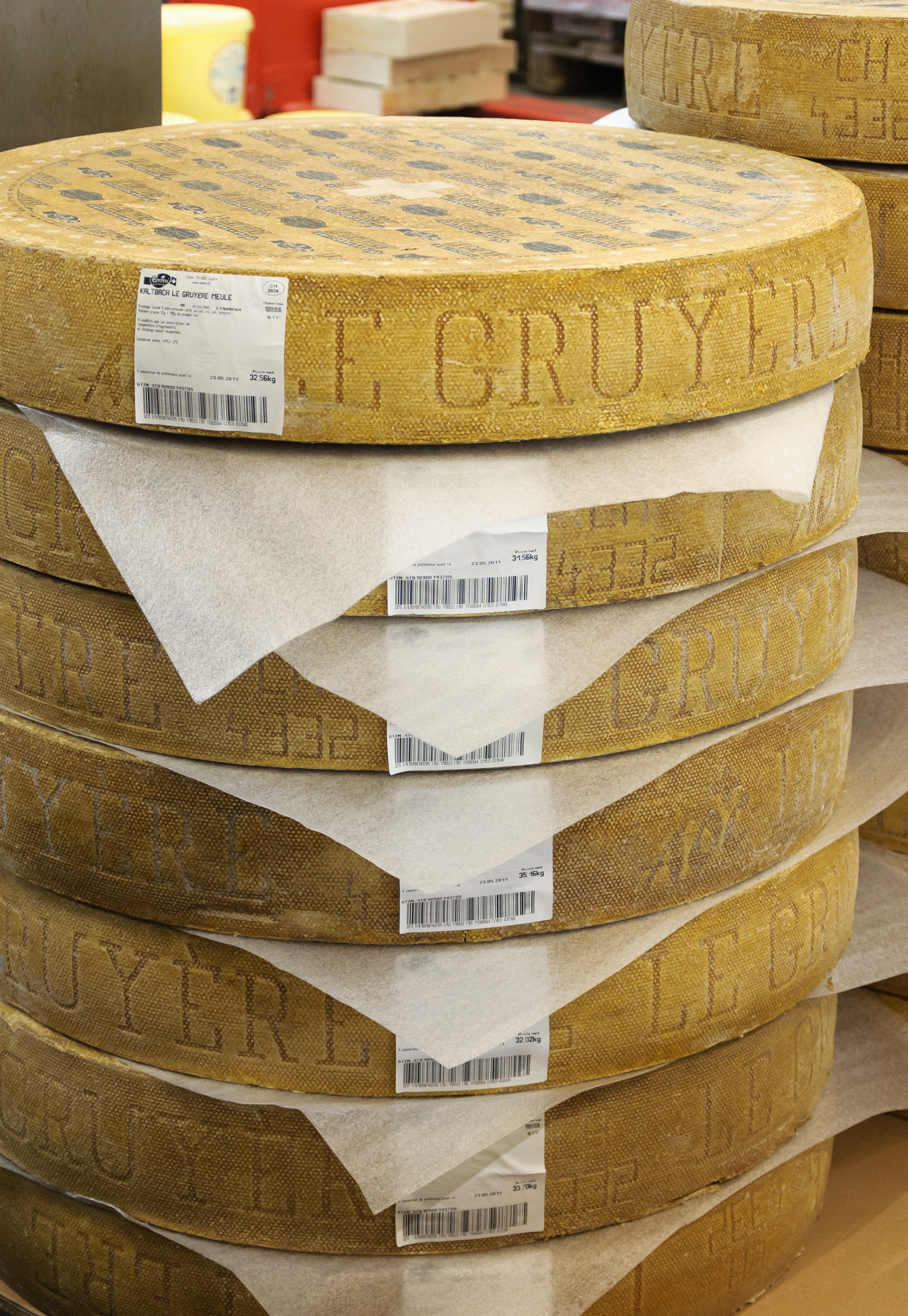
Rounds of Swiss Gruyère cheese on sale in a wholesale food market in France

=== Switzerland ===
In 2001, Gruyère gained the Appellation d'origine contrôlée (now designated Appellation d'origine protégée) status. Since then, the production and the maturation have been strictly defined, and all Swiss Gruyère producers must follow these rules.

=== France ===
Although Gruyère is recognised as a Swiss Geographical Indication in the EU, Gruyère of French origin is also protected as a Protected Geographical Indication (PGI) in the EU. To avoid confusion, the EU PGI Gruyère must indicate that it comes from France and must make sure it cannot be confused with Gruyère from Switzerland. It, therefore, is generally sold as "French Gruyère".

French Gruyère may be produced in an area much larger than the Swiss AOP area. The PGI documentation also requires that French Gruyère has holes "ranging in size from that of a pea to a cherry", a significant departure from the Swiss original. Peter Ungphakorn, a Swiss local and an international trade expert, comments that the French Comté cheese could be a closer match to the Swiss version.

Although the termes Gruyère is protected, in France, in everyday speech, it is sometimes confused with Emmental. This confusion was caused by Emmental exporters, who wanted to capitalise on Gruyère’s reputation by giving their product that name.

=== United States ===
In 2021, a U.S. District Court ruled that the term "gruyere" had become a generic term for a certain type of cheese, and Swiss and French Gruyère producers' associations could not register it as a trademark in the United States. The U.S. Court of Appeals for the Fourth Circuit affirmed that decision in March 2023.

Swiss Gruyère still has a protected certification mark in the US as "Le Gruyère Switzerland AOC", secured in 2013.

The FDA standards of identity for a "§ 133.149 Gruyere cheese" requires "small holes or eyes".

== Varieties ==
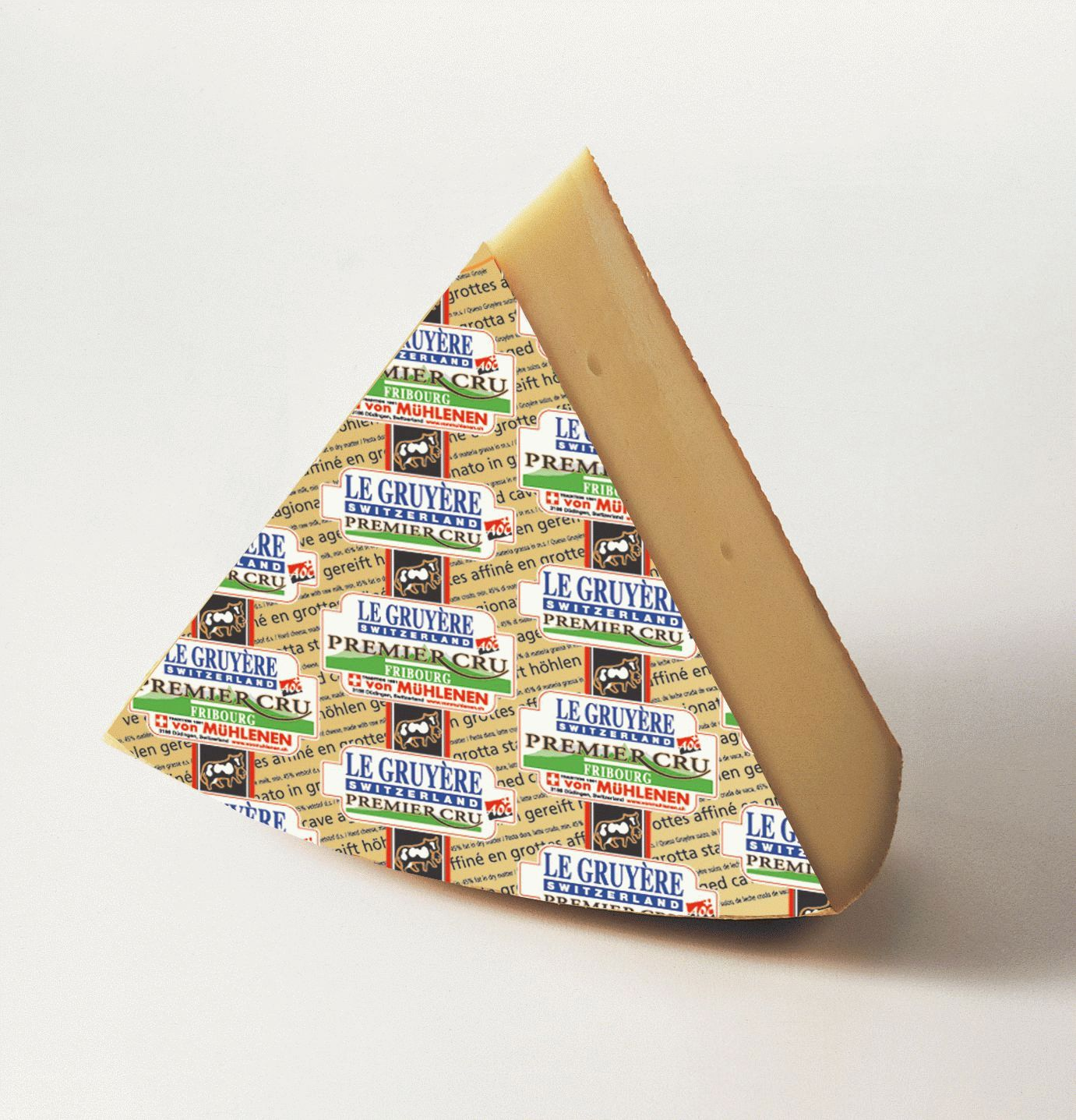
Gruyère from the brand/variety Le Premier Cru Switzerland

Gruyere (as a Swiss AOC) has many varieties with different age profiles, and an organic version of the cheese is also sold. A special variety is produced only in summer in the Swiss Alps and is branded as Le Gruyère Switzerland AOC Alpage.

Generally, one can distinguish the age profiles of mild/doux (minimum 6 months old) and réserve, also known as surchoix (minimum 10 months old). In Switzerland, other age profiles can be found, including mi-salé (7–8 months), salé (9–10 months), vieux (14 months), and Höhlengereift (cave aged), but these age profiles are not part of the AOC.

=== Le Gruyère AOP Premier Cru ===
Le Gruyère Premier Cru is a special variety, produced and matured exclusively in the canton of Fribourg and matured for 14 months in cellars with a humidity of 95% and a temperature of 13.5 °C (56.3 °F).

It is the only cheese that has won the title of the best cheese in the world at the World Cheese Awards five times, in 1992, 2002, 2005, 2015, and 2022.

== Similar cheeses ==
Livno cheese (Livanjski sir) from Bosnia and Herzegovina, is produced based on technology of making the Gruyère cheese since the 19th century (1886) in the area of Livno. Originally, it was made from sheep's milk, nowadays, it is mainly made from a mixture of sheep's and cow's milk in 80:20 ration.

L'Etivaz is a very similar Swiss hard cheese from the canton of Vaud. It is made from raw cow's milk and is very similar to aged Gruyère in taste. In the 1930s, a group of 76 Gruyère-producing families felt that government regulations were allowing cheesemakers to compromise the qualities that made good Gruyère so special. They withdrew from the government's Gruyère program, and "created" their own cheese - L'Etivaz - named for the village around which they all lived. They founded a cooperative in 1932, and the first cheese cellars were built in 1934.

The French Le Brouère cheese, made in nearby Vosges, is considered a variant of Gruyère.

Γραβιέρα (graviera) is a popular Greek cheese, which resembles Gruyère and is an EU Protected Designation of Origin. Some Naxian varieties (produced from cow's milk) tend to be milder and sweeter, and various gravieras from Crete are produced from sheep's milk.

Kars gravyer cheese is a Turkish cheese made of cow's milk or a mixture of cow's and goat's milks. Gruyère-style cheeses are also produced in the United States, with Wisconsin having the largest output.

== See also ==
- Culinary Heritage of Switzerland – online encyclopedia of Swiss cuisine
- List of cheeses
- Swiss cheeses and dairy products
- Gruyère cream, another dairy product from the same region
- Palazzo della Civiltà Italiana in Rome, known locally as La Groviera (literally The Gruyère) is so known because it is "full of holes", referring to the stereotype of Swiss cheese.
