= Payoya goat =

Breed of goat

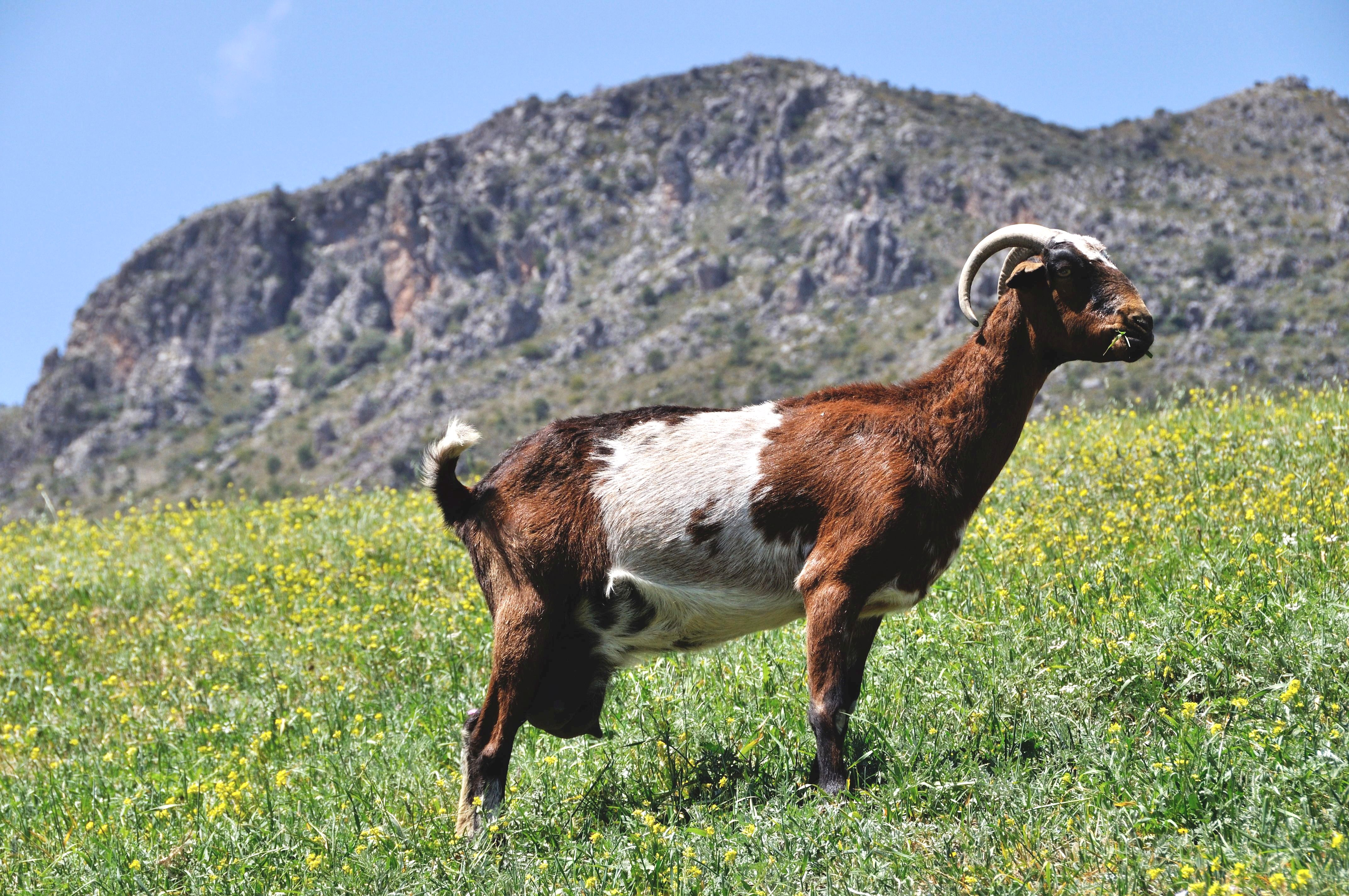
Female payoya goat in Grazalema, Cádiz.

Payoya is a Spanish breed of goat from the Sierra de Cádiz. It is named after the village of Villaluenga del Rosario, whose inhabitants are known as payoyos. This breed is officially considered to be endangered by the Government of Spain. It is a dairy breed, famous for the payoyo cheese made from its milk since 1997.

In the Serranía de Ronda, Province of Málaga, it is known as Montejaqueña.
