= Villaluenga del Rosario =

Villaluenga del Rosario, Spain
- Flag Coat of arms

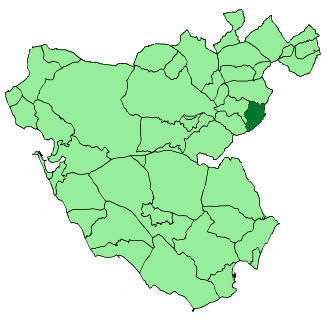
- Location of Villaluenga del Rosario
- Coordinates: 36°42′N 5°23′W
- Municipality: Cádiz

Government
  - Mayor: Alfonso Carlos Moscoso

Area
  - Total: 57 km^{2} (22 sq mi)
  - Land: 57 km^{2} (22 sq mi)
  - Water: 0.00 km^{2} (0 sq mi)

Population (2025-01-01)
  - Total: 463
  - Density: 8.1/km^{2} (21/sq mi)
- Time zone: UTC+1 (CET)
  - Summer (DST): UTC+2 (CEST)
- Website: villaluengadelrosario.es

Villaluenga del Rosario is a village located in the province of Cádiz, Spain. According to the 2005 census, the city has a population of 481 inhabitants. It is located down Navazo Alto mountain, within the Sierra de Grazalema Natural Park. The village is famous for its payoyo cheese, first produced in 1996 from the milk of the local, endangered Payoya goat.

== Demographics ==
Historical population
Year	Pop.	±%
1999	447	—
2000	440	−1.6%
2001	414	−5.9%
2002	455	+9.9%
2003	449	−1.3%
2004	473	+5.3%
2005	481	+1.7%
Source: INE (Spain)

== Gallery ==
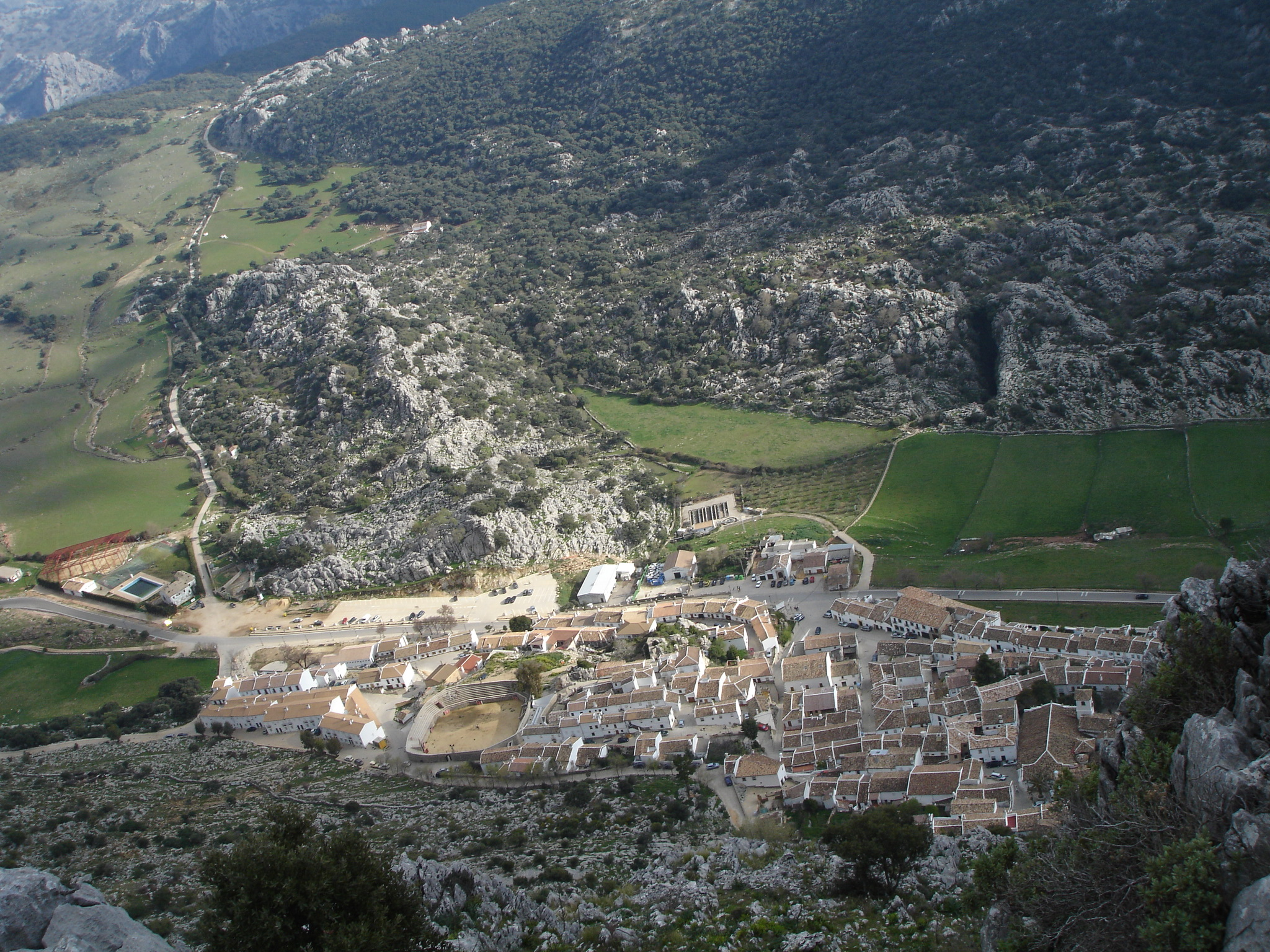
View of Villaluenga del Rosario when climbing to Navazo Alto

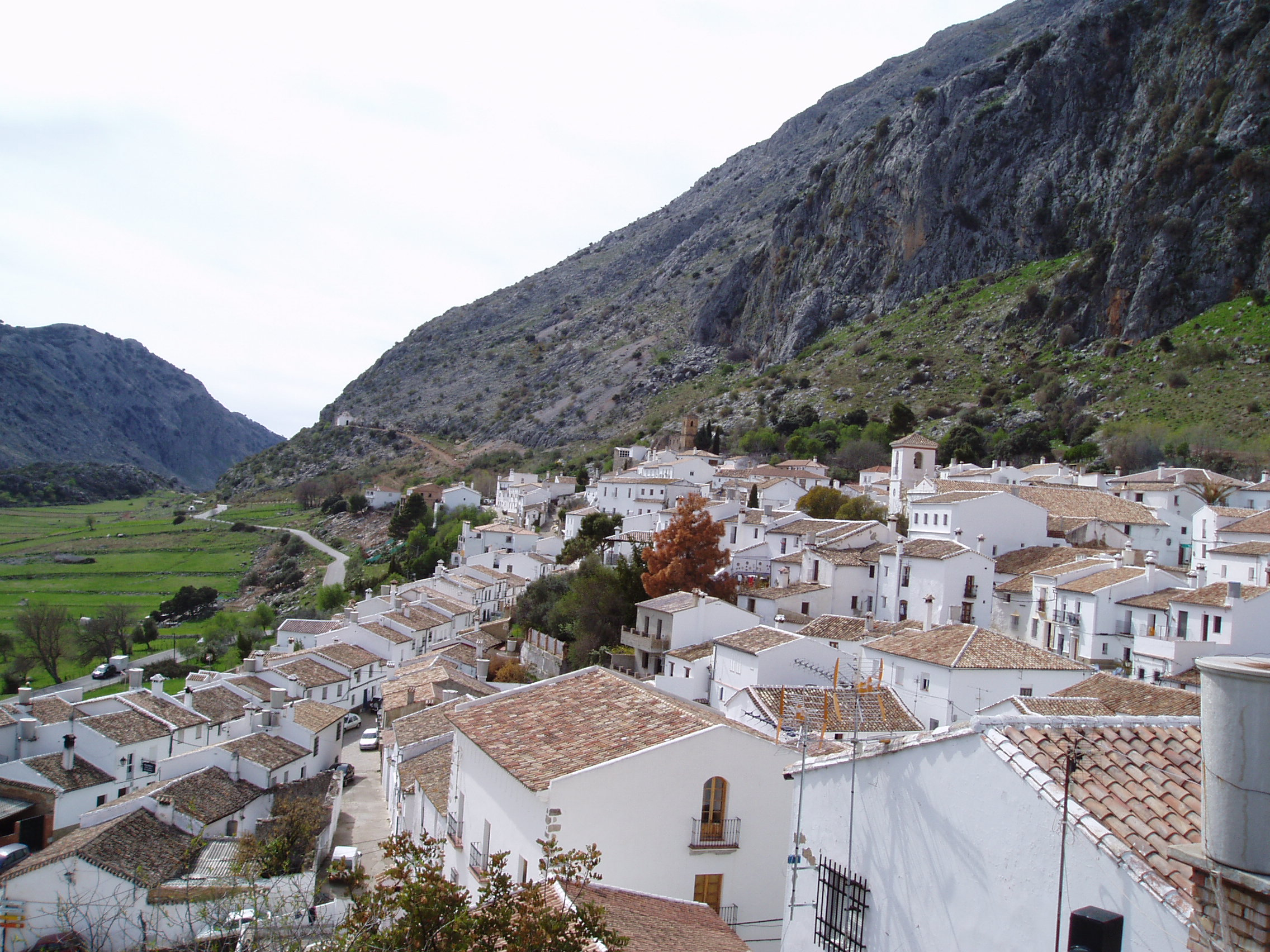
Villaluenga del Rosario

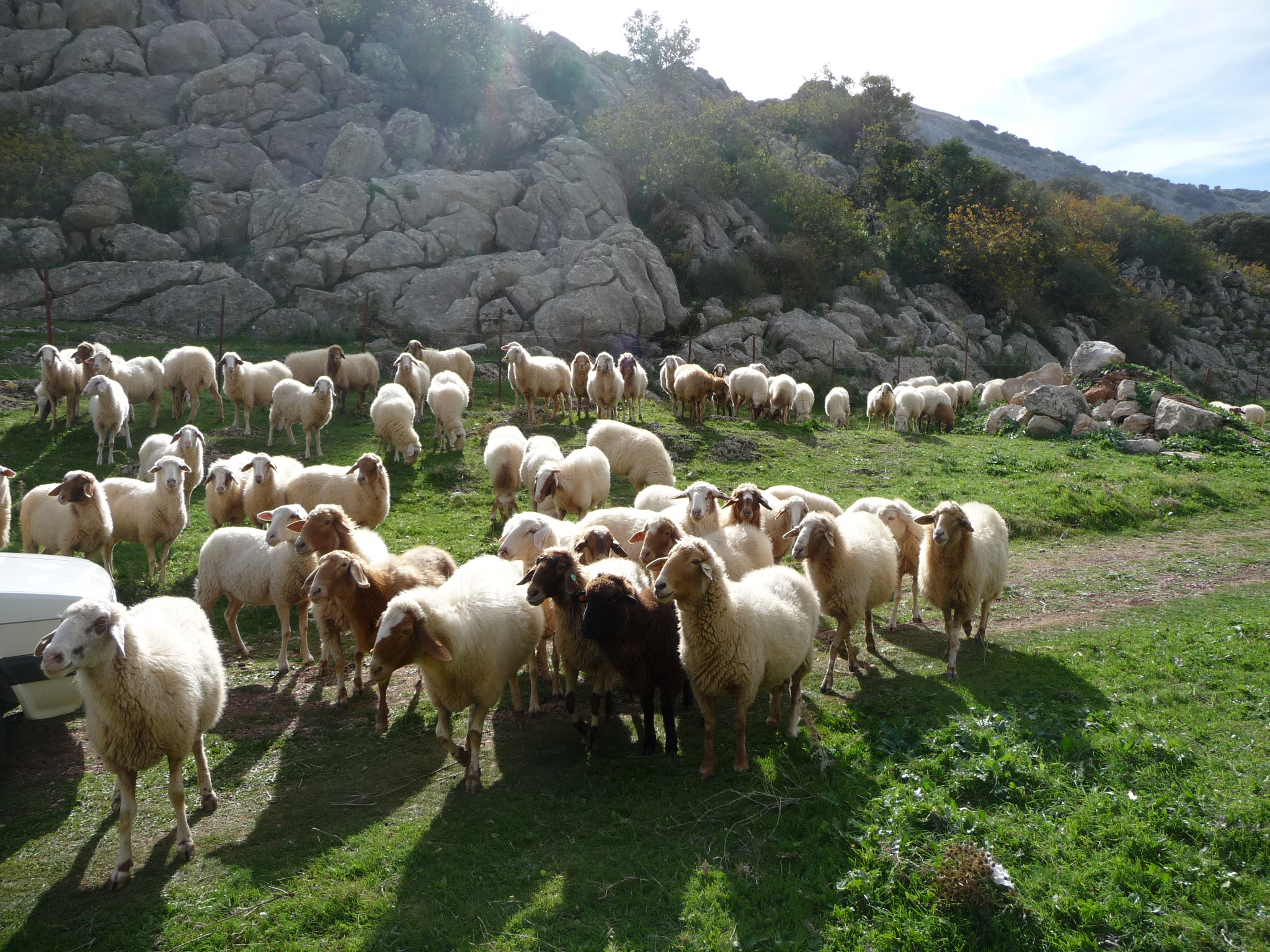
Sheep crossing a road

== See also ==
- List of municipalities in Cádiz
