= Guild of Fine Food =

British food business media company

The Guild of Fine Food Limited
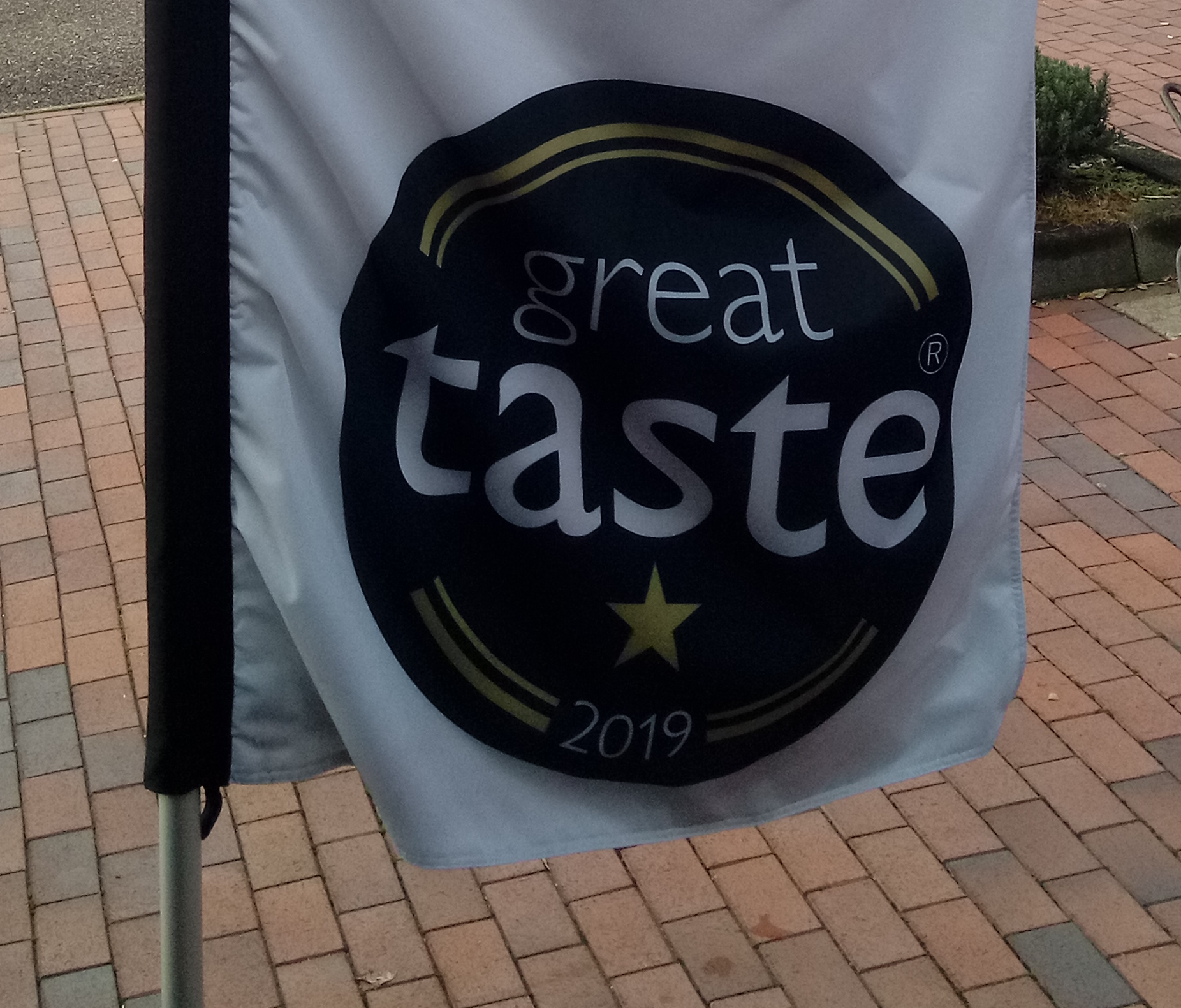
- Great Taste Award badge, awarded by the Guild of Fine Food
- Company type: Private Company
- Founded: 1992
- Founder: Bob Farrand
- Headquarters: Gillingham, Dorset, UK
- Number of locations: 2
- Website: www.gff.co.uk

The Guild of Fine Food (GFF) is a British family-owned industry journal publisher that covers gourmet food news. It was founded by Bob Farrand in 1992.

All five directors are members of the Farrand family. Bob Farrand is the chairman, his son John Farrand is the managing director, daughter-in-law Tortie Farrand marketing director, his wife Linda Farrand a director and niece Sally Coley

GFF promotes the Great Taste Awards and also the World Cheese Awards, which were initiated in 1988.

From its base in Gillingham, near Shaftesbury in Dorset, it promotes producers and sellers of "artisan food and drink" across England, Wales, Scotland and Northern Ireland.

== Great Taste Awards ==
The Great Taste Awards are open to members and non-members, but only products that pay an entry fee of between £38 and £240 per product are judged. Winning products receive one, two or three stars. In 2018, 12,634 food and drink products were judged.

== World Cheese Awards ==
The following cheeses have been named champion at the World Cheese Awards:

Year	Winner	Venue and other details
1988	(England) Blue Cheshire by Hutchinson-Smith & Sons	
1989	(England) Blue Stilton by Dairy Crest	
1990	(England) Mature Traditional Cheddar by Dairy Crest	
1991	(France) Fourme d'Ambert by Hennart Frères	
1992	(Switzerland) Le Gruyère Premier Cru by von Mühlenen	
1993	(England) Double Gloucester by Dairy Crest	
1994	(France) Brie de Meaux AOC by Hennart Frères	
1995	(England) Shropshire Blue by Cropwell Bishop Creamery	
1996	(England) Lord of the Hundreds by Traditional Cheese Dairy	
1997	(Italy) Parmigiano Reggiano by Caseificio Vittorio Quistello	
1998	(England) Mature Traditional Cheddar by Dairy Crest	
1999	(Netherlands) Kollumer 18 months by Frico Cheese	
2000	(England) Mature West Country Farmhouse Cheddar by Brue Valley Farms	
2001	(France) Camembert Super Medaillon by Isigny Sainte-Mère (Republic of Ireland) Mature Cheddar by Carbery	
2002	(Switzerland) Le Gruyère AOC Reserve by von Mühlenen	
2003	(France) Chevre d'Or Camembert by Eurial-Poitouaine/Eurilai	
2004	(France) Camembert de Normandie by Isigny Sainte-Mère	
2005	(Switzerland) Le Gruyère Premier Cru by von Mühlenen	
2006	(France) Ossau-Iraty by Fromagerie Agour	
2007	(France) Brie de Meaux by Rénard Gillard	
2008	(Spain) Queso Arico Curado Pimentón by Sociedad Canaria de Formento	
2009	(Canada) Le Cendrillon by La Maison Alexis de Portneuf	
2010	(England) Cornish Blue by Cornish Cheese Company	
2011	(France) Ossau-Iraty by Fromagerie Agour	
2012	(Spain) Manchego DO Gran Reserva by Dehesa de Los Llanos	
2013	(Germany) Montagnolo Affiné by Käserei Champignon	Birmingham, England; 2,777 cheeses
2014	(England) Bath Blue by Bath Soft Cheese	London, England; 2,600 cheeses
2015	(Switzerland) Le Gruyère AOP by von Mühlenen	Birmingham, England; 2,727 cheeses
2016	(Norway) Kraftkar by Tingvollost	San Sebastián, Spain; 3,060 cheeses
2017	(England) Cornish Kern by Lynher Dairies Cheese Company	London, England; 3,001 cheeses
2018	(Norway) Fanaost by Ostegården	Bergen, Norway; 3,472 cheeses
2019	(United States) Rogue River Blue by Rogue Creamery	Bergamo, Italy; 3,804 cheeses
2020	No competition due to COVID-19.	
2021	(Spain) Olavidia by Qesos y Besos (Lacteos Romero Pelaez)	Oviedo, Spain; 4,079 cheeses
2022	(Switzerland) Le Gruyère AOC by Vorderfultigen Gourmino	Newport, Wales; 4,434 cheeses
2023	(Norway) Nidelven Blå by Gangstad Gårdsysteri	Trondheim, Norway; 4,502 cheeses
2024	(Portugal) Queijo de Ovelha Amanteigado by Quinta do Pomar	Fundão, Portugal; 4,786 cheeses
2025	(Switzerland) Le Gruyère AOP by Bergkäserei Vorderfultigen	Bern, Switzerland; 5,244 cheeses
